= 2021 Liga 3 South Kalimantan =

Tournament details
- Dates: 1 November 2021
- Teams: 14

Final positions
- Champions: Persemar Martapura
- Runners-up: Batulicin Putra 69

The 2021 Liga 3 South Kalimantan was the sixth season of Liga 3 South Kalimantan as a qualifying round for the national round of the 2021–22 Liga 3.

Persetala Tanah Laut were the defending champion.

== Teams ==
There are 14 teams participated in the league this season, divided into 2 groups of seven.

Team	Location
Barabai	Central Hulu Sungai
Batulicin Putra 69	Tanah Bumbu
Kotabaru	Kotabaru
Perseam Amuntai	North Hulu Sungai
Persebaru Banjarbaru	Banjarbaru
Persehan Marabahan	Barito Kuala
Persemar Martapura	Banjar Regency
Persepan Pagatan	Tanah Bumbu
Perseran Rantau	Tapin
Persetala Tanah Laut	Tanah Laut
Persitam Tamban	Barito Kuala
Peseban Banjarmasin	Banjarmasin
PS Kab. Tapin	Tapin
Talenta Banua	Banjar Regency

== Group stage ==
=== Group A ===
Pos	Team	Pld	W	D	L	GF	GA	GD	Pts	Qualification
1	Batulicin Putra 69	6	5	0	1	24	4	+20	15	Advanced to Semi final
2	Perseam Amuntai	6	5	0	1	16	5	+11	15	Advanced to Semi final
3	Persetala Tanah Laut	6	4	1	1	15	3	+12	13	
4	PS Kab. Tapin	6	3	0	3	12	6	+6	9	
5	Persebaru Banjarbaru	6	2	1	3	10	8	+2	7	
6	Talenta Banua	6	1	0	5	5	31	−26	3	
7	Persitam Tamban	6	0	0	6	1	26	−25	0	

Updated to match(es) played on 16 November 2021. Source: Liga 3 Kalimantan Selatan

=== Group B ===
Pos	Team	Pld	W	D	L	GF	GA	GD	Pts	Qualification
1	Persemar Martapura	6	6	0	0	15	1	+14	18	Advanced to Semi final
2	Kotabaru	6	4	1	1	20	2	+18	13	Advanced to Semi final
3	Peseban Banjarmasin	6	4	0	2	11	5	+6	12	
4	Persepan Pagatan	6	3	1	2	9	8	+1	10	
5	Barabai	6	1	1	4	4	16	−12	4	
6	Perseran Rantau	6	1	0	5	5	16	−11	3	
7	Persehan Marabahan	6	0	1	5	2	18	−16	1	

Updated to match(es) played on 16 November 2021. Source: Liga 3 Kalimantan Selatan

== Knockout stage ==
Semi final
A1	Batulicin Putra 69	2
B2	Kotabaru	1
B1	Persemar Martapura	3
A2	Perseam Amuntai	2

Final
Batulicin Putra 69	1 (5)
Persemar Martapura	1 (6)
