= 2022 Liga 3 South Kalimantan =

Tournament details
- Country: Indonesia
- Dates: 18 September 2022 – TBD 2022
- Teams: 11

Final positions
- Champions: Persetala Tanah Laut
- Runners-up: Kotabaru
- Qualified for: 2022 Liga 3 National Round

Tournament statistics
- Matches played: 19
- Goals scored: 51 (2.68 per match)

The 2022 Liga 3 South Kalimantan is the fifth edition of Liga 3 South Kalimantan organized by Asprov PSSI South Kalimantan.

Followed by 11 clubs. The winner of this competition will immediately advance to the national round.

Persemar is the defending champion after winning it in the 2021 season.

== Teams ==
| No | Team | Location |
|---|---|---|
| 01 | Barabai | Central Hulu Sungai Regency |
| 02 | Perseam | North Hulu Sungai Regency |
| 03 | Persepan | Tanah Bumbu Regency |
| 04 | Kotabaru | Kotabaru Regency |
| 05 | Persetam | Barito Kuala Regency |
| 06 | Persemar | Banjar Regency |
| 07 | PS Talenta Banua | Banjar Regency |
| 08 | PS Balangan | Balangan Regency |
| 09 | Persetala | Tanah Laut Regency |
| 10 | Persebaru | Banjarbaru |
| 11 | Peseban | Banjarmasin |

== First round ==
=== Group A ===
| Pos | Team | Pld | W | D | L | GF | GA | GD | Pts | Qualification | PTL | PTM | PMR | PRU |
|---|---|---|---|---|---|---|---|---|---|---|---|---|---|---|
| 1 | Persetala | 5 | 5 | 0 | 0 | 18 | 1 | +17 | 15 | Advance to Second round | — | 2–0 | 2–0 | 4–0 |
| 2 | Persitam | 5 | 3 | 0 | 2 | 4 | 9 | −5 | 9 | Advance to Second round | 0–6 | — | 1–0 | 1–0 |
| 3 | Persemar | 4 | 0 | 1 | 3 | 1 | 7 | −6 | 1 (Note: Head-to-head results: Persemar 0–0 Persebaru.) | | 1–4 | | — | 0–0 |
| 4 | Persebaru | 4 | 0 | 1 | 3 | 1 | 7 | −6 | 1 | | | 1–2 | | — |

Source: 2022 Liga 3 South Kalimantan

=== Grup B ===
| Pos | Team | Pld | W | D | L | GF | GA | GD | Pts | Qualification | PBN | PTB | KOT | PBA |
|---|---|---|---|---|---|---|---|---|---|---|---|---|---|---|
| 1 | Peseban | 5 | 2 | 2 | 1 | 8 | 3 | +5 | 8 | Advance to Second round | — | 1–1 | 0–0 | 5–0 |
| 2 | PS Talenta Banua | 5 | 2 | 2 | 1 | 8 | 6 | +2 | 8 | Advance to Second round | | — | 1–0 | 2–2 |
| 3 | Kotabaru | 5 | 2 | 2 | 1 | 7 | 5 | +2 | 8 | | 2–0 | 2–1 | — | |
| 4 | PS Balangan | 5 | 0 | 2 | 3 | 6 | 15 | −9 | 2 | | 0–2 | 1–3 | 3–3 | — |

Source: 2022 Liga 3 South Kalimantan

=== Grup C ===
| Pos | Team | Pld | W | D | L | GF | GA | GD | Pts | Qualification | PSM | PSN | BAR |
|---|---|---|---|---|---|---|---|---|---|---|---|---|---|
| 1 | Perseam | 3 | 2 | 1 | 0 | 7 | 2 | +5 | 7 | Advance to Second round | — | 1–0 | 5–1 |
| 2 | Persepan | 2 | 0 | 1 | 1 | 1 | 2 | −1 | 1 | Advance to Second round | 1–1 | — | |
| 3 | Barabai | 1 | 0 | 0 | 1 | 1 | 5 | −4 | 0 | | | | — |

Source: 2022 Liga 3 South Kalimantan

== Second round ==
=== Group D ===
| Pos | Team | Pld | W | D | L | GF | GA | GD | Pts | Qualification | T1 | T2 | T3 |
|---|---|---|---|---|---|---|---|---|---|---|---|---|---|
| 1 | Group A Winner | 0 | 0 | 0 | 0 | 0 | 0 | 0 | 0 | Advance to Semi-finals | — | | |
| 2 | Group B Runner-up | 0 | 0 | 0 | 0 | 0 | 0 | 0 | 0 | Advance to Semi-finals | | — | |
| 3 | Group C Winner | 0 | 0 | 0 | 0 | 0 | 0 | 0 | 0 | | | | — |

Updated to match(es) played on unknown. Source: 2022 Liga 3 South Kalimantan

=== Group E ===
| Pos | Team | Pld | W | D | L | GF | GA | GD | Pts | Qualification | T1 | T2 | T3 |
|---|---|---|---|---|---|---|---|---|---|---|---|---|---|
| 1 | Group A Runner-up | 0 | 0 | 0 | 0 | 0 | 0 | 0 | 0 | Advance to Semi-finals | — | | |
| 2 | Group B Winner | 0 | 0 | 0 | 0 | 0 | 0 | 0 | 0 | Advance to Semi-finals | | — | |
| 3 | Group C Runner-up | 0 | 0 | 0 | 0 | 0 | 0 | 0 | 0 | | | | — |

Updated to match(es) played on unknown. Source: 2022 Liga 3 South Kalimantan

== Knockout stage ==
Semi-finals

Final
Third place
