= 2023 Liga 3 South Kalimantan =

Tournament details
- Country: Indonesia
- Dates: 22 October – 9 January 2024
- Teams: 10

Final positions
- Champions: PS Kab. Tapin (1st title)
- Runners-up: PS Talenta Banua
- Qualified for: 2023–24 Liga 3 National phase

2023 Liga 3 South Kalimantan is the sixth edition of Liga 3 South Kalimantan organized by Asprov PSSI South Kalimantan.

Followed by 10 clubs. The winner of this competition will immediately advance to the national phase to represent South Kalimantan to compete for promotion tickets to Liga 2.

Persetala is the defending champion after winning it in the 2022 season.

== Teams ==
No.	Team	Location
1	Gasib	Central Hulu Sungai Regency
2	PS Kab. Tapin	Tapin Regency
3	Persepan	Tanah Bumbu Regency
4	Kotabaru	Kotabaru Regency
5	Persehan	Barito Kuala Regency
6	Banjar Union	Banjar Regency
7	PS Talenta Banua	Banjar Regency
8	Persetala	Tanah Laut Regency
9	Persebaru	Banjarbaru
10	Peseban	Banjarmasin

== First round ==
=== Group A ===
Pos	Team	Pld	W	D	L	GF	GA	GD	Pts	Qualification
1	Kotabaru	8	5	0	3	20	10	+10	15	Advance to Second Round
2	PS Talenta Banua	8	4	3	1	16	5	+11	15	Advance to Second Round
3	Banjar Union	8	4	2	2	16	6	+10	14	Advance to Second Round
4	Persepan	8	3	3	2	10	9	+1	12	
5	Persebaru	8	0	0	8	2	34	−32	0	

Updated to match(es) played on 19 November 2023. Source: Liga 3 2023 Kalimantan Selatan

=== Grup B ===
Pos	Team	Pld	W	D	L	GF	GA	GD	Pts	Qualification
1	PS Kab. Tapin	8	6	1	1	16	4	+12	19	Advance to Second Round
2	Persetala	8	5	1	2	16	8	+8	16	Advance to Second Round
3	Peseban	8	3	2	3	15	8	+7	11	Advance to Second Round
4	Persehan	8	1	2	5	10	15	−5	5	
5	Gasib	8	1	2	5	9	31	−22	5	

Updated to match(es) played on 19 November 2023. Source: Liga 3 2023 Kalimantan Selatan

== Second round ==
=== Grup C ===
Pos	Team	Pld	W	D	L	GF	GA	GD	Pts	Qualification
1	PS Talenta Banua	4	2	2	0	10	6	+4	8	Advance to Knock-out Stage
2	Persetala	4	1	1	2	8	10	−2	4	Advance to Knock-out Stage
3	Banjar Union	4	1	1	2	5	7	−2	4	

Updated to match(es) played on 21 December 2023. Source: Liga 3 2023 Kalimantan Selatan

=== Grup D ===
Pos	Team	Pld	W	D	L	GF	GA	GD	Pts	Qualification
1	PS Kab. Tapin	4	4	0	0	8	2	+6	12	Advance to Knock-out Stage
2	Kotabaru	4	2	0	2	7	8	−1	6	Advance to Knock-out Stage
3	Peseban	4	0	0	4	5	10	−5	0	

Updated to match(es) played on 21 December 2023. Source: Liga 3 2023 Kalimantan Selatan

== Knockout round ==
=== Bracket ===
Semi-finals
Kotabaru	1	1	2
PS Talenta Banua	0	3	3
Persetala Tanah Laut	0	0	0
PS Kab. Tapin	0	2	2

Final
PS Talenta Banua	0 (4)
PS Kab. Tapin	0 (5)

== Qualification to the national phase ==
Team	Method of qualification	Date of qualification	Qualified to
PS Kab. Tapin	2023 Liga 3 South Kalimantan champions	9 January 2023	2023–24 Liga 3 National Phase
