= 2025–26 Liga 4 South Kalimantan =

Liga 4 South Kalimantan
- Season: 2025–26
- Dates: 20 December 2025 – 17 February 2026
- Champions: Persemar (1st title)
- Runner up: Barabai
- National phase: Persemar

The 2025–26 Liga 4 South Kalimantan will be the second season of Liga 4 South Kalimantan after the structural changes of Indonesian football competition and serves as a qualifying round for the national phase of the 2025–26 Liga 4. The competition is organised by the South Kalimantan Provincial PSSI Association.

PS Kab. Tapin are the two-time defending champions but will not be able to defend their title as they're not participating in this season.

== Teams ==
A total of 10 teams are competing in this season.

Locations of teams in the 2025–26 Liga 4 South Kalimantan.
Blue: Group A; Red: Group B

Team	Location	Stadium	Capacity	2024–25 season
Barabai	Central Hulu Sungai	Murakata	10,000	—
Banjar Union	Banjar	Green Yakin Soccer Field	0	—
Perseam Amuntai	North Hulu Sungai	Karias	1,000	—
Persehan Marabahan	Barito Kuala	5th December	5,000	—
Perseka Kandangan	South Hulu Sungai	2nd December	5,000	Second round (3rd in Group D)
Persemar Martapura	Banjar	Demang Lehman	7,000	—
Persenus Nusantara	Banjarmasin	Green Yakin Soccer Field	0	Semi-finalist
Persepan Pagatan	Tanah Bumbu	7th February	0	First round (4th in Group B)
Persetala Tanah Laut	Tanah Laut	Pertasi Kencana	5,000	Second round (3rd in Group C)
Putra Plaosan Martapura	Banjar	Demang Lehman	7,000	Runner-up

== First round ==
The 10 teams will be drawn into two groups of five. The first round will be played in home-and-away round-robin matches.

The top two teams of each group will qualify for the second round.

=== Group A ===
Pos	Team	Pld	W	D	L	GF	GA	GD	Pts	Qualification
1	Putra Plaosan Martapura	8	6	2	0	21	0	+21	20	Qualification to the second round
2	Barabai	8	3	3	2	9	5	+4	12	Qualification to the second round
3	Perseka Kandangan	8	2	3	3	6	12	−6	9	Qualification to the second round
4	Perseam Amuntai	8	2	2	4	10	18	−8	8	
5	Banjar Union	8	0	4	4	3	14	−11	4	

Source: Liga 4 South Kalimantan
Rules for classification: 1) Points; 2) Head-to-head points; 3) Head-to-head goal difference; 4) Head-to-head goals scored; 5) Goal difference; 6) Goals scored; 7) Fair-play points; 8) Draw.

=== Group B ===
Pos	Team	Pld	W	D	L	GF	GA	GD	Pts	Qualification
1	Persemar Martapura	8	5	2	1	21	6	+15	17	Qualification to the second round
2	Persetala Tanah Laut	8	4	2	2	19	11	+8	14	Qualification to the second round
3	Persenus Nusantara	8	4	1	3	21	8	+13	13 (Note: Tied on head-to-head points. Head-to-head goal difference: Persenus Nusantara +1, Persepan Pagatan –1.)	Qualification to the second round
4	Persepan Pagatan	8	4	1	3	17	11	+6	13	
5	Persehan Marabahan	8	0	0	8	3	45	−42	0	

Source: Liga 4 South Kalimantan
Rules for classification: 1) Points; 2) Head-to-head points; 3) Head-to-head goal difference; 4) Head-to-head goals scored; 5) Goal difference; 6) Goals scored; 7) Fair-play points; 8) Draw.

== Second round ==
The top six teams from the first round will be divided into 2 groups of three teams. The second round will be played in home-and-away round-robin matches.

The top two teams of each group will qualify for the knockout round.

=== Group C ===
Pos	Team	Pld	W	D	L	GF	GA	GD	Pts	Qualification
1	Putra Plaosan Martapura	4	3	1	0	9	4	+5	10	Qualification to the Knockout round
2	Persenus Nusantara	4	1	1	2	5	6	−1	4	Qualification to the Knockout round
3	Persetala Tanah Laut	4	1	0	3	5	9	−4	3	

Source: Liga 4 South Kalimantan
Rules for classification: 1) Points; 2) Head-to-head points; 3) Head-to-head goal difference; 4) Head-to-head goals scored; 5) Goal difference; 6) Goals scored; 7) Fair-play points; 8) Draw.

=== Group D ===
Pos	Team	Pld	W	D	L	GF	GA	GD	Pts	Qualification
1	Barabai	4	2	1	1	12	5	+7	7	Qualification to the Knockout round
2	Persemar Martapura	4	2	1	1	12	7	+5	7	Qualification to the Knockout round
3	Perseka Kandangan	4	1	0	3	5	17	−12	3	

Source: Liga 4 South Kalimantan
Rules for classification: 1) Points; 2) Head-to-head points; 3) Head-to-head goal difference; 4) Head-to-head goals scored; 5) Goal difference; 6) Goals scored; 7) Fair-play points; 8) Draw.

== Knockout round ==
The knockout round will be played as a single match. If tied after regulation time, extra time and, if necessary, a penalty shoot-out will be used to decide the winning team.

=== Bracket ===
Semi-finals
12 February
Putra Plaosan Martapura	0 (3)
Persemar Martapura	0 (4)
12 February
Barabai	3
Persenus Nusantara	1

Final
17 February
Persemar Martapura	2
Barabai	1
Third place play-off
17 February
Putra Plaosan Martapura	2
Persenus Nusantara	0

== See also ==
- 2025–26 Liga 4
- 2025–26 Liga 4 Central Kalimantan
- 2025–26 Liga 4 East Kalimantan
- 2025–26 Liga 4 West Kalimantan
