= List of Indonesian national electoral districts =

Map of the electoral districts of Indonesia as of 2019

Map of the electoral districts of Indonesia as of the 2024 election

This is a list of Indonesia's national electoral districts in accordance with Law No. 7 of 2017 and Government Regulation in Lieu of Law No.1/2022, and the regencies and cities included within each national electoral district.

Members of the House of Representatives (Indonesian: Dewan Perwakilan Rakyat) are elected from multi-member electoral districts (Indonesian: Daerah Pemilihan/Dapil). In total, there are 84 districts across Indonesia's 38 provinces. Individual districts are named after their provinces and, if the province has multiple districts, assigned a roman numeral indicating its number in the province. The 2024 general election used the 84 electoral districts where 580 members of the House of Representatives were elected.

All electoral districts are located entirely within one province and includes regencies and cities within their boundaries, without any regency or city being part of multiple districts. Between 3 and 10 representatives are allocated to each district. From all 38 provinces, 22 of them are at-large districts, 4 in Sumatra; the Special Region of Yogyakarta; Bali; 3 in Kalimantan; 5 in Sulawesi; and 8 in Maluku and Papua. Also, East Jakarta and Bogor Regency have their own at-large districts. West Java and East Java are tied for the province with the most electoral districts, with 11 each, followed by Central Java with 10.

Selection of elected representatives in 2024 followed a Webster/Sainte-Laguë method.

== 2022 changes ==
With the formation of the new provinces of South Papua, Central Papua, Highland Papua, and Southwest Papua, politicians urged the need for representatives to be elected for these provinces. The West Papua electoral district was split into the West Papua and Southwest Papua electoral districts, while the Papua electoral district was split into South Papua, Central Papua, Highland Papua, and Papua electoral districts in accordance with Article 243 of the Government Regulation in Lieu of Law No.1/2022. Each of these provinces was awarded three seats.

Nusantara is not yet to be split from the East Kalimantan electoral district in accordance with Article 568A of the Government Regulation in Lieu of Law No.1/2022, so East Kalimantan representatives at People's Representative Council may represent East Kalimantan and Nusantara areas in 2024 general election. Additionally, explanatory clause of the Article 568A of the Government Regulation in Lieu of Law No.1/2022, East Kalimantan Provincial Representative Council, Kutai Kartanegara Regional Representative Council, and North Penajam Paser Regional Representative Council will no longer have jurisdiction and have no representative rights over Nusantara upon the Presidential Decree on Capital Relocation from Jakarta to Nusantara signed. The decree will be issued in 2024.

== List ==
Note: italics indicate a provincial capital.

=== Sumatra (126 seats) ===
==== Aceh I (7 seats) ====
Regencies: Simeulue, Aceh Singkil, Aceh Selatan, Aceh Tenggara, Aceh Barat, Aceh Besar, Pidie, Aceh Barat Daya, Aceh Jaya, Gayo Lues, Nagan Raya, Pidie Jaya

Cities: Banda Aceh, Sabang, Subulussalam

==== Aceh II (6 seats) ====
Regencies: Aceh Timur, Aceh Tengah, Bireuen, Aceh Utara, Aceh Tamiang, Bener Meriah

Cities: Langsa, Lhokseumawe

==== North Sumatra I (10 seats) ====
Regencies: Deli Serdang, Serdang Bedagai

Cities: Tebingtinggi, Medan

==== North Sumatra II (10 seats) ====
Regencies: Nias, Mandailing Natal, Tapanuli Selatan, Tapanuli Tengah, Tapanuli Utara, Toba Samosir, Labuhan Batu, Nias Selatan, Humbang Hasundutan, Samosir, Labuhan Batu Selatan, Labuhan Batu Utara, Nias Utara, Nias Barat, Padang Lawas Utara, Padang Lawas

Cities: Sibolga, Padangsidempuan, Gunungsitoli

==== North Sumatra III (10 seats) ====
Regencies: Asahan, Simalungun, Dairi, Karo, Langkat, Pakpak Bharat, Batubara

Cities: Tanjungbalai, Pematangsiantar, Binjai

==== West Sumatra I (8 seats) ====
Regencies: Mentawai Islands, Pesisir Selatan, Solok, Sijunjung, Tanah Datar, Solok Selatan, Dharmasraya

Cities: Padang Panjang, Padang, Solok, Sawahlunto

==== West Sumatra II (6 seats) ====
Regencies:Padang Pariaman, Agam, Lima Puluh Kota, Pasaman, Pasaman Barat

Cities: Bukittinggi, Pariaman, Payakumbuh

==== Riau I (7 seats) ====
Regencies: Siak, Bengkalis, Kepulauan Meranti, Rokan Hilir, Rokan Hulu

Cities: Pekanbaru, Dumai

==== Riau II (6 seats) ====
Regencies: Kuantan Singingi, Indragiri Hulu, Indragiri Hilir, Pelalawan, Kampar

==== Jambi (8 seats) ====
All regencies and cities

==== South Sumatra I (8 seats) ====
Regencies: Musi Rawas, Musi Banyuasin, Banyuasin

Cities: Palembang, Lubuklinggau

==== South Sumatra II (9 seats) ====
Regencies: Ogan Komering Ulu, Ogan Komering Ilir, Muara Enim, Lahat, Ogan Komering Ulu Selatan, Ogan Komering Ulu Timur, Ogan Ilir, Empat Lawang, Penukal Abab Lematang Ilir

Cities: Pagar Alam, Prabumulih

==== Bengkulu (4 seats) ====
All regencies and cities

==== Lampung I (10 seats) ====
Regencies: Tanggamus, Lampung Selatan, Pesawaran, Pringsewu, Lampung Barat, Pesisir Barat

Cities: Bandar Lampung, Metro

==== Lampung II (10 seats) ====
Regencies: Lampung Timur, Lampung Tengah, Lampung Utara, Way Kanan, Tulangbawang, Mesuji, Tulang Bawang Barat

==== Bangka Belitung Islands (3 seats) ====
All regencies and cities

==== Riau Islands (4 seats) ====
All regencies and cities

=== Java (306 seats) ===
==== Banten I (6 seats) ====
Regencies: Pandeglang, Lebak

==== Banten II (6 seats) ====
Regencies: Serang

Cities: Cilegon, Serang

==== Banten III (10 seats) ====
Regencies: Tangerang

Cities: Tangerang, South Tangerang

==== Jakarta I (6 seats) ====
Cities: East Jakarta

==== Jakarta II (7 seats) ====
Cities: Central Jakarta, South Jakarta, overseas voters

==== Jakarta III (8 seats) ====
Regencies: Thousand Islands

Cities: North Jakarta, West Jakarta

==== West Java I (7 seats) ====
Cities: Bandung, Cimahi

==== West Java II (10 seats) ====
Regencies: Bandung, West Bandung

==== West Java III (9 seats) ====
Regencies: Cianjur

Cities: Bogor

==== West Java IV (6 seats) ====
Regencies: Sukabumi

Cities: Sukabumi

==== West Java V (9 seats) ====
Regencies: Bogor

==== West Java VI (6 seats) ====
Cities: Bekasi, Depok

==== West Java VII (10 seats) ====
Regencies: Bekasi, Karawang, Purwakarta

==== West Java VIII (9 seats) ====
Regencies: Cirebon, Indramayu

Cities: Cirebon

==== West Java IX (8 seats) ====
Regencies: Subang, Sumedang, Majalengka

==== West Java X (7 seats) ====
Regencies: Ciamis, Kuningan, Pangandaran

Cities: Banjar

==== West Java XI (10 seats) ====
Regencies: Garut, Tasikmalaya

Cities: Tasikmalaya

==== Central Java I (8 seats) ====
Regencies: Semarang, Kendal

Cities: Semarang, Salatiga

==== Central Java II (7 seats) ====
Regencies: Kudus, Demak, Jepara

==== Central Java III (9 seats) ====
Regencies: Grobogan, Blora, Rembang, Pati

==== Central Java IV (7 seats) ====
Regencies: Wonogiri, Karanganyar, Sragen

==== Central Java V (8 seats) ====
Regencies: Boyolali, Klaten, Sukoharjo

Cities: Surakarta

==== Central Java VI (8 seats) ====
Regencies: Purworejo, Wonosobo, Magelang, Temanggung

Cities: Magelang

==== Central Java VII (7 seats) ====
Regencies: Purbalingga, Banjarnegara, Kebumen

==== Central Java VIII (8 seats) ====
Regencies: Cilacap, Banyumas

==== Central Java IX (8 seats) ====
Regencies: Brebes, Tegal

Cities: Tegal

==== Central Java X (7 seats) ====
Regencies: Batang, Pekalongan, Pemalang

Cities: Pekalongan

==== Yogyakarta S.R. (8 seats) ====
All cities and regencies

==== East Java I (10 seats) ====
Regencies: Sidoarjo

Cities: Surabaya

==== East Java II (7 seats) ====
Regencies: Probolinggo, Pasuruan

Cities: Probolinggo, Pasuruan

==== East Java III (7 seats) ====
Regencies: Banyuwangi, Bondowoso, Situbondo

==== East Java IV (8 seats) ====
Regencies: Lumajang, Jember

==== East Java V (8 seats) ====
Regencies: Malang

Cities: Batu, Malang

==== East Java VI (9 seats) ====
Regencies: Blitar, Kediri, Tulungagung

Cities: Blitar, Kediri

==== East Java VII (8 seats) ====
Regencies: Pacitan, Ponorogo, Trenggalek, Magetan, Ngawi

==== East Java VIII (10 seats) ====
Regencies: Mojokerto, Jombang, Nganjuk, Madiun

Cities: Madiun, Mojokerto

==== East Java IX (6 seats) ====
Regencies: Bojonegoro, Tuban

==== East Java X (6 seats) ====
Regencies: Gresik, Lamongan

==== East Java XI (8 seats) ====
Regencies: Bangkalan, Pamekasan, Sampang, Sumenep

=== Lesser Sunda Islands (33 seats) ===
==== Bali (9 seats) ====
All regencies and cities

==== West Nusa Tenggara I (3 seats) ====
Regencies: West Sumbawa, Sumbawa, Dompu, Bima

Cities: Bima

==== West Nusa Tenggara II (8 seats) ====
Regencies: West Lombok, North Lombok, East Lombok, Central Lombok

Cities: Mataram

==== East Nusa Tenggara I (6 seats) ====
Regencies: Alor, Lembata, Flores Timur, Sikka, Ende, Ngada, Manggarai, Manggarai Barat, Nagekeo, Manggarai Timur

==== East Nusa Tenggara II (7 seats) ====
Regencies: Sumba Barat, Sumba Timur, Kupang, Timor Tengah Selatan, Timor Tengah Utara, Belu, Malaka, Rote Ndao, Sumba Tengah, Sumba Barat Daya, Sabu Raijua

Cities: Kupang

=== Kalimantan (40 seats) ===
==== West Kalimantan I (8 seats) ====
Regencies: Sambas, Bengkayang, Landak, Pontianak, Ketapang, Kayong Utara, Kubu Raya

Cities: Pontianak, Singkawang

==== West Kalimantan II (4 seats) ====
Regencies: Sanggau, Sintang, Kapuas Hulu, Sekadau, Melawi

==== Central Kalimantan (6 seats) ====
All regencies and cities

==== South Kalimantan I (6 seats) ====
Regencies: Banjar, Barito Kuala, Tapin, Hulu Sungai Selatan, Hulu Sungai Tengah, Hulu Sungai Utara, Tabalong, Balangan

==== South Kalimantan II (5 seats) ====
Regencies: Tanah Laut, Kota Baru, Tanah Bumbu

Cities: Banjarmasin, Banjarbaru

==== East Kalimantan (8 seats) ====
All regencies and cities

==== North Kalimantan (3 seats) ====
All regencies and cities

=== Sulawesi (50 seats) ===
==== South Sulawesi I (8 seats) ====
Regencies: Bantaeng, Jeneponto, Takalar, Gowa, Selayar Islands

Cities: Makassar

==== South Sulawesi II (9 seats) ====
Regencies: Bulukumba, Sinjai, Maros, Pangkajene and Islands, Barru, Bone, Soppeng, Wajo

Cities: Parepare

==== South Sulawesi III (7 seats) ====
Regencies: Sidenreng Rappang, Pinrang, Enrekang, Luwu, Tana Toraja, Luwu Utara, Luwu Timur, Toraja Utara

Cities: Palopo

==== West Sulawesi (4 seats) ====
All regencies and cities

==== Southeast Sulawesi (6 seats) ====
All regencies and cities

==== Central Sulawesi (7 seats) ====
All regencies and cities

==== Gorontalo (3 seats) ====
All regencies and cities

==== North Sulawesi (6 seats) ====
All regencies and cities

=== Maluku and Papua (25 seats) ===
==== Maluku (4 seats) ====
All regencies and cities

==== North Maluku (3 seats) ====
All regencies and cities

==== Papua (3 seats) ====
Regencies: Yapen Islands, Biak Numfor, Sarmi, Keerom, Waropen, Supiori, Mamberamo Raya, Jayapura Regency

Cities: Jayapura

==== South Papua (3 seats) ====
Regencies: Boven Digoel, Mappi, Asmat

Cities: Merauke

==== Central Papua (3 seats) ====
Regencies: Puncak Jaya, Paniai, Mimika, Puncak, Dogiyai, Intan Jaya, Deiyai, Nabire Regency

Cities: Nabire

==== Highland Papua (3 seats) ====
Regencies: Jayawijaya, Pegunungan Bintang, Yahukimo, Tolikara, Mamberamo Tengah, Yalimo, Lanny Jaya, Nduga

Cities: Wamena

==== West Papua (3 seats) ====
Regencies: Fakfak, Teluk Bintuni, Teluk Wondama, Kaimana, South Manokwari, Pegunungan Arfak

Cities: Manokwari

==== Southwest Papua (3 seats) ====
Regencies: Sorong Regency, South Sorong, Raja Ampat, Tambrauw, Maybrat

Cities: Sorong

Source: Law No. 7/2017 which amended by Government Regulation in Lieu of Law No. 1/2022 and Regulation of General Elections Commission No. 6/2023
