= Telephone numbers in Indonesia =

- Country: Indonesia
- Continent: Asia
- Regulator: Komdigi
- Numbering plan type: Open
- NSN length: 11 digits (landline); 12 digits (mobile)
- Format: xxx-xxxx-xxxx (landline); 8xx-xxxx-xxxxx (mobile)
- Country code: +62
- International access: 00
- Long-distance: 0

Telephone numbers in Indonesia have different systems for landlines and mobile phones: landlines use area codes, while mobile phones do not.

For landline area codes, the digit "0" is added before the area code when dialing domestic long distance from within Indonesia, but is always omitted when calling from abroad. Instead, callers would use the Indonesian country code +62, followed by the area code, without the "0". Domestic phone numbers in large cities have 8 digits, and in other areas 7 digits. Mobile phone numbers have 9 to 11 digits for postpaid services, depending on the operator, whereas prepaid services have 10 to 12 digits, determined by the operator.

Until October 1999, East Timor was included in the Indonesian telephone numbering plan, using the area codes 0390 (for Dili) and 0399 (for Baucau).

To make a phone call to Indonesia from abroad, the following formats are used:

For calls to landlines, callers dial +62, followed by the area code and subscriber's number, omitting the '0', hence a number in Jakarta would be dialled as +62 21-xxxx-xxxx. For calls to mobile wireless phone (GSM) from abroad, callers dial +62, followed by the subscriber's number, omitting the '0', hence +62 083822117064

== Overview ==
=== Numbers in business contact information ===
On business cards and other contact information, telephone numbers might be listed as "HP" or "hunting". "HP" is an abbreviation for "hand phone" or mobile phone and is pronounced "hah péh". Hand phones might also be referred to as pon-sel (short form of telepon seluler) or telepon genggam ("hold-in-the-hand telephone"). Hunting refers to line hunting, an office line in which multiple individual lines are connected so that an incoming call can roll over to another line if the first line is busy. This permits only one number to be published.

=== Operators ===
International call operators:

- PT Indosat: 101
- PT Telkom: 107

Domestic call operators: 100 International phone number information: 102 Local phone number information: 108

Phone number information in another area:

- 106
- <Area code> 108.

=== International Direct Dialing Prefix ===
- PT Atlasat Solusindo (SLI-01018) : 01018
- PT Gaharu Sejahtera (SLI-01019) : 01019
- PT XL Axiata Tbk (XL): 01000 (VoIP)
- PT Indosat Tbk: 001, 008 or 01016, 01088, 01089 (VoIP).
- PT Telkom: 007 or 01017, 01052 (VoIP).
- PT Smartfren Telecom: 01033 ou 01068 (VoIP).
- Axis: 01012 (VoIP).

To make an International phone call from Indonesia, you should use the following format:

<IDD prefix> <country code> <area code> <phone number>

=== Fixed CDMA Wireless ===
Numbering for FWA CDMA follows the PSTN rules (area code)-XXXX-XXXX. Which X depends on the empty slot of the numbering plan, and may vary between cities. But mostly, for Jakarta (and some other big cities);

- PT Bakrie Telecom Tbk (Esia): (area code) 9XXX-XXXX, (021) 80XX-XXXX, (021) 83XX-XXXX
- PT Telkom Tbk (TelkomFlexi): (021) 70XX-XXXX, (021) 68XX-XXXX, (area code) 54XX-XXX, (area code) 70XX-XXX, (area code) 80XX-XXX, (area code) 81XX-XXX, (area code) 68XX-XXX, (area code) 3XXX-XXXX
- PT Indosat Tbk (StarOne): (021) 30XX-XXXX, (031) 60XX-XXXX, (area code) 61XX-XXX, (area code) 62XX-XXX, (area code) 63XX-XXX, (area-code) 90XX-XXXX
- PT Mobile-8 Telecom Tbk (Fren & Hepi): (area code) 50XX-XXXX, (area code) 21XX-XXXX, (area code) 31XX-XXXX

=== CDMA Mobile Wireless ===
- PT Smartfren Telecom : 0887-XXXX-XXXX, 0888-XXXX-XXXX, 0889-XXXX-XXXX
- PT Sampoerna Telekomunikasi Indonesia (Ceria/Net1): 0827-XXXX-XXXX, 0828-xxxx-xxxx
- PT Smart Telecom (Smart): 0881-XXXX-XXXX, 0882-XXXX-XXXX, 0883-XXXX-XXXX, 0884-XXXX-XXXX, 0885-XXXX-XXXX, 0886-XXXX-XXXX

=== GSM Mobile Wireless ===
- PT Indosat
  - IM3 (Prepaid and Postpaid) prefix: 0814, 0815, 0816, 0855, 0856, 0857, 0858.
  - 3 Indonesia (merged with Indosat) prefix: 0895, 0896, 0897, 0898, 0899.
- PT Telkomsel
  - Telkomsel Halo (Postpaid), Simpati (Prepaid), and by.U (MVNO) prefix: 0811, 0812, 0813, 0821, 0822, 0823, 0851, 0852, 0853.
- PT XLSmart Telecom Sejahtera Tbk
  - 'XL Prepaid', XL Prioritas (Postpaid), and LIVE.ON (MVNO) prefix: 0817, 0818, 0819, 0859, 0877, 0878.
  - AXIS (acquired by XL) prefix: 0831, 0832, 0833, 0838.
  - Smartfren and Smartfren Power Up (MVNO) prefix: 0881, 0882, 0883, 0884, 0885, 0886, 0887, 0888, 0889.

=== Satellite Phone ===
- PT Telkom

== Emergency number ==
In Indonesia, emergency numbers are mostly using 11x format

- Police: 110
- Ambulance: 118 or 119
- Fire: 113
- Search and Rescue (BASARNAS): 115
- Mobile and satellite phone: 112

== Calling formats ==
To call in Indonesia, the following format is used:

xxx-xxxx Calls within an area code +62 yyy-xxx-xxxx Calls inside Indonesia in city centers

+62 yyy-xxxx-xxxx Calls from outside Indonesia

+62 8nn-xxxx-xxxxx Calls to mobiles from outside Indonesia

== Area 2 ==
These are area codes for the provinces of Jakarta, Banten, West Java, Yogyakarta, and Central Java.

=== Jakarta ===
- All areas—021

=== Banten ===
- Tangerang, South Tangerang—021
- Lebak—0252
- Pandeglang—0253
- Cilegon, Serang—0254

=== West Java ===
- Bekasi, Depok, parts of Bogor Regency—021
- Bandung, Cimahi, parts of Sumedang (Jatinangor)—022
- Cirebon—0231
- Kuningan—0232
- Majalengka—0233
- Indramayu—0234
- Bogor City, parts of Depok (Sawangan), parts of Bogor Regency—0251
- Subang—0260
- Sumedang—0261
- Garut—0262
- Cianjur—0263
- Purwakarta—0264
- Tasikmalaya, Ciamis, Banjar, Pangandaran Regency—0265
- Sukabumi—0266
- Karawang—0267

=== Central Java ===
- Semarang, parts of Semarang Regency—024
- Surakarta, Sragen, Karanganyar, Sukoharjo, parts of Boyolali—0271
- Klaten—0272
- Wonogiri—0273
- Purworejo—0275
- Boyolali—0276
- parts of Cilacap—0280
- Banyumas, Purbalingga—0281
- Cilacap—0282
- Tegal, Brebes—0283
- Pemalang—0284
- Pekalongan, Batang—0285
- Banjarnegara, Wonosobo—0286
- Kebumen—0287
- Bumiayu—0289
- Kudus, Jepara—0291
- Grobogan—0292
- Magelang, Temanggung—0293
- Kendal, parts of Batang (Gringsing)—0294
- Pati, Rembang—0295
- Blora—0296
- Karimun Jawa—0297
- Salatiga, parts of Semarang Regency, parts of Boyolali—0298

=== Yogyakarta ===
- All areas—0274

== Area 3 ==
These are area codes for the provinces of East Java, Bali, West Nusa Tenggara, and East Nusa Tenggara.

=== East Java ===
- Surabaya, Gresik, Sidoarjo, Bangkalan—031
- Mojokerto, Jombang—0321
- Lamongan—0322
- Sampang—0323
- Pamekasan—0324
- Bawean—0325
- Masalembu Islands—0326
- Kangean—0327
- Sumenep—0328
- Jember—0331
- Bondowoso—0332
- Banyuwangi—0333
- Lumajang—0334
- Probolinggo—0335
- parts of Jember—0336
- Situbondo—0338
- Malang, Batu—0341
- Blitar—0342
- Pasuruan—0343
- Madiun, Magetan, Ngawi—0351
- Ponorogo—0352
- Bojonegoro—0353
- Kediri—0354
- Tulungagung, Trenggalek—0355
- Tuban—0356
- Pacitan—0357
- Nganjuk—0358

=== Bali ===
- Denpasar, Badung, Gianyar, parts of Tabanan—0361
- Buleleng—0362
- Karangasem—0363
- Jembrana—0365
- Klungkung, Bangli—0366
- parts of Tabanan (Baturiti)—0368

=== West Nusa Tenggara ===
- Mataram, West Lombok, Central Lombok—0370
- Sumbawa—0371
- West Sumbawa—0372
- Dompu—0373
- Bima—0374
- East Lombok—0376

=== East Nusa Tenggara ===
- Alor Islands—0379
- Kupang—0380
- Ende—0381
- Sikka—0382
- East Flores—0383
- Ngada—0384
- Manggarai—0385
- West Manggarai—0386
- Sumba—0387
- North Central Timor, South Central Timor—0388
- Belu—0389

== Area 4 ==
These are area codes for the provinces of West Sulawesi, South Sulawesi, Central Sulawesi, South East Sulawesi, North Sulawesi, and Gorontalo.

=== South East Sulawesi ===
- Kendari, parts of Konawe Regency—0401
- Buton—0402
- Muna—0403
- Wakatobi—0404
- Kolaka—0405
- parts of Konawe Regency—0408

=== South Sulawesi ===
- Pangkajene—0410
- Makassar, Maros, Gowa—0411
- Bantaeng, Bulukumba—0413
- Selayar Islands—0414
- Malino—0417
- Takalar—0418
- Jeneponto—0419
- Enrekang—0420
- Pare Pare, Pinrang, Sidenreng Rappang—0421
- Tana Toraja—0423
- Barru—0427
- Luwu—0471
- parts of Wajo Regency (Pitumpanua)—0472
- North Luwu—0473
- East Luwu—0474
- parts of East Luwu Regency (Sorowako)—0475
- Bone—0481
- Sinjai—0482
- Soppeng—0484
- Wajo—0485

=== West Sulawesi ===
- Majene—0422
- Mamuju—0426
- Polewali—0428
- Central Mamuju—0429

=== Central Sulawesi ===
- Morowali—0409
- Buol—0445
- Parigi Moutong—0450
- Palu, Sigi—0451
- parts of Poso Regency—0452
- Toli-Toli—0453
- parts of Parigi Moutong Regency (Tinombo)—0454
- parts of Parigi Moutong Regency (Moutong)—0455
- Donggala—0457
- parts of Poso Regency (Tentena)—0458
- Banggai—0461
- Banggai Island—0462
- parts of Banggai Regency (Bunta)—0463
- Tojo Una-Una—0464
- North Morowali—0465

=== North Sulawesi ===
- South Minahasa—0430
- Manado, Tomohon, Minahasa, North Minahasa—0431
- Sangihe Islands—0432
- Talaud Islands—0433
- Bolaang Mongondow (incl. Kotamobagu)—0434
- Kema, Kauditan, Bitung—0438

=== Gorontalo ===
- Gorontalo—0435
- North Gorontalo—0442
- Pohuwato Regency—0443

== Area 5 ==
These are area codes for the provinces of West Kalimantan, Central Kalimantan, South Kalimantan, East Kalimantan, and North Kalimantan.

=== West Kalimantan ===
- Ketapang—0534
- Kayong Utara—0535
- Pontianak—0561
- Sambas, Bengkayang, Singkawang—0562
- Landak—0563
- Sanggau, Sekadau—0564
- Sintang—0565
- Kapuas Hulu—0567
- Melawi—0568

=== Central Kalimantan ===
- Kapuas, Pulang Pisau—0513
- North Barito—0519
- South Barito, East Barito—0526
- Murung Raya—0528
- East Kotawaringin—0531
- West Kotawaringin, Sukamara, -- 0532
- Palangka Raya, Katingan—0536
- Gunung Mas—0537
- Seruyan—0538
- Seruyan, parts of East Kotawaringin—0539

=== South Kalimantan ===
- Banjarmasin, Banjar, Banjarbaru, Barito Kuala—0511
- Tanah Laut—0512
- Hulu Sungai Selatan, Hulu Sungai Tengah, Tapin—0517
- Tanah Kambatang Lima, Tanah Bumbu—0518
- Tabalong, Balangan—0526
- Hulu Sungai Utara—0527

=== East Kalimantan ===
- Samarinda, Kutai Kartanegara—0541
- Balikpapan, Penajam North Paser—0542
- Paser—0543
- West Kutai—0545
- Bontang—0548
- East Kutai—0549
- Berau—0554

=== North Kalimantan ===
- Tarakan, Bunyu Island—0551
- Bulungan, Tana Tidung—0552
- Malinau—0553
- Nunukan—0556

== Area 6 ==
These are area codes for the Provinces of Aceh and North Sumatra.

=== Aceh ===
- Subulussalam—0627
- Southeast Aceh—0629
- Langsa, East Aceh, Aceh Tamiang—0641
- Gayo Lues—0642
- Central Aceh, Bener Meriah—0643
- Bireuen—0644
- Lhokseumawe, North Aceh—0645
- parts of East Aceh—0646
- Simeulue—0650
- Banda Aceh, Aceh Besar, parts of Aceh Jaya (Lamno) -- 0651
- Sabang—0652
- Pidie, Pidie Jaya—0653
- Aceh Jaya—0654
- West Aceh, Nagan Raya—0655
- South Aceh—0656
- parts of South Aceh—0657
- Singkil—0658
- Southwest Aceh—0659

=== North Sumatra ===
- Medan, Binjai, parts of Deli Serdang, parts of Serdang Bedagai (Perbaungan, Pantai Cermin), parts of Langkat—061
- parts of Langkat (Pangkalan Brandan) -- 0620
- Tebing Tinggi, Serdang Bedagai—0621
- Pematang Siantar, Simalungun, Batubara, parts of Serdang Bedagai—0622
- Asahan, Tanjungbalai, parts of Labuhan Batu (Labuhan Ruku) -- 0623
- Labuhan Batu—0624
- Parapat, parts of Samosir—0625
- Samosir—0626
- Dairi, Pakpak Bharat—0627
- Karo, parts of Deli Serdang (Bandar Baru, Sibolangit) -- 0628
- South Nias—0630
- Central Tapanuli, Sibolga—0631
- Toba Samosir—0632
- North Tapanuli, Humbang Hasundutan—0633
- South Tapanuli, Padang Sidempuan—0634
- parts of South Tapanuli—0635
- Mandailing Natal—0636
- parts of Central Tapanuli (Barus)—0638
- Nias—0639

== Area 7 ==
These are area codes for the Provinces of West Sumatra, Riau, Riau Islands, Jambi, South Sumatra, Bengkulu, Bangka-Belitung, and Lampung.

=== West Sumatra ===
- Padang, Padang Pariaman, Pariaman, parts of South Pesisir—0751
- Agam, Tanah Datar, Limapuluh Koto, Bukittinggi, Padang Panjang, Payakumbuh—0752
- Pasaman, West Pasaman—0753
- Sawahlunto, Sijunjung, Dharmasraya—0754
- Solok, South Solok—0755
- South Pesisir—0756
- parts of South Pesisir—0757
- Mentawai Islands—0759

=== Riau ===
- Kuantan Singingi—0760
- Pekanbaru, Pelalawan, parts of Siak, parts of Kampar—0761
- Kampar, Rokan Hulu—0762
- parts of Bengkalis—0763
- Siak—0764
- Dumai, parts of Bengkalis (Duri), parts of Rokan Hulu (Bagan Batu) -- 0765
- Bengkalis—0766
- Rokan Hulu—0767
- Indragiri Hilir—0768
- Indragiri Hulu—0769

=== Riau Islands ===
- Muka Kuning Batamindo—0770
- Tanjungpinang, Bintan—0771
- Anambas Islands—0772
- Natuna Islands—0773
- Lingga—0776
- Great Karimun—0777
- Batam—0778
- Kundur—0779

=== Jambi ===
- Jambi, Muaro Jambi—0741
- West Tanjung Jabung—0742
- Batanghari—0743
- Tebo—0744
- Sarolangun—0745
- Merangin—0746
- Bungo, parts of Tebo (Rimbo Bujang) -- 0747
- Kerinci—0748

=== South Sumatra ===
- Empat Lawang—0702
- Palembang, Ogan Ilir, Banyuasin—0711
- Ogan Komering Ilir—0712
- Prabumulih, parts of Muara Enim—0713
- Musi Banyuasin—0714
- Pagar Alam, parts of Lahat—0730
- Lahat—0731
- Lubuklinggau, Musi Rawas—0733
- Muara Enim—0734
- Ogan Komering Ulu—0735

=== Bangka-Belitung ===
- parts of Bangka (Belinyu) -- 0715
- West Bangka—0716
- Bangka, Pangkal Pinang—0717
- Central Bangka, South Bangka—0718
- Belitung—0719

=== Bengkulu ===
- Rejang Lebong, Kepahiang—0732
- Bengkulu, Seluma—0736
- North Bengkulu, Muko-muko—0737
- South Bengkulu, Kaur—0739

=== Lampung ===
- Bandar Lampung, parts of South Lampung—0721
- Tanggamus—0722
- Way Kanan—0723
- North Lampung—0724
- Metro, Central Lampung, East Lampung—0725
- Tulang Bawang—0726
- South Lampung—0727
- West Lampung—0728
- Pringsewu Regency—0729
- part of Tanggamus—084

== Area 9 ==
These are area codes for the provinces of Maluku, North Maluku, Papua, Central Papua, Highland Papua, South Papua, Southwest Papua, and West Papua.

=== Maluku ===
- Banda Naira—0910
- Ambon—0911
- Namlea—0913
- Masohi—0914
- Tual—0916
- Dobo—0917
- Saumlaki—0918

=== North Maluku ===
- Weda—0920
- Ternate—0921
- Tobelo—0924
- Tidore—0929

=== West Papua ===
- Kaimana, Fak Fak—0956
- Manokwari—0986

=== Southwest Papua ===
- Sorong—0951
- South Sorong—0952

=== Papua ===
- Biak—0981
- Jayapura—0967
- Nabire—0984
- Serui—0963
- Sarmi—0966
- Yapen—0983

=== Highland Papua ===
- All areas—0969

=== Central Papua ===
- Tembagapura—0979
- Timika—0901

=== South Papua ===
- Agats—0902
- Boven Digoel—0975
- Merauke—0971

== See also ==
- Communications in Indonesia
