= Batulicin Putra 69 F.C. =

Indonesian football club

Batulicin Putra 69
- Full name: Batulicin Putra 69 Football Club
- Founded: 2020; 6 years ago
- Ground: Batulicin Stadium; Batulicin, Tanah Bumbu Regency
- Capacity: 2,000
- Owner: Askab PSSI Kabupaten Tanah Bumbu
- Coach: Andi Abunawas
- League: Liga 3
- 2021–22: Liga 3, Round of 32 (National)
Home colours	Away colours

Batulicin Putra 69 (formerly known as PS Tanbu Putra) is an Indonesian football club based in Tanah Bumbu, South Kalimantan. They currently competes in Liga 3.

== Honours ==
- Liga 3 South Kalimantan
  - Runner-up: 2021
