= Barabai F.C. =

Barabai FC
- Full name: Barabai Football Club
- Nickname: Laskar Parijs van Borneo
- Founded: 26 February 2009; 17 years ago
- Ground: Murakata Stadium; Barabai, Central Hulu Sungai Regency
- Capacity: 10,000
- Owner: PSSI Central Hulu Sungai
- Chairman: H. Mukarram
- Manager: Fajar Sukma
- Coach: Eko Tamamie
- League: Liga 4
Home colours	Away colours

Barabai Football Club (simply known as Barabai FC) is an Indonesian football club based in Central Hulu Sungai Regency, South Kalimantan. They currently competes in Liga 4 South Kalimantan zone.

== Honours ==
- Liga 4 South Kalimantan
  - Runner-up (1): 2025–26
