= Persebaru Banjarbaru =

Indonesian football club

- Full name: Persatuan Sepakbola Banjarbaru
- Nickname: Laskar Berlian
- Founded: 1983; 43 years ago
- Ground: Demang Lehman Stadium
- Capacity: 15,000
- Owner: Askot PSSI Banjarbaru
- Manager: Khairil Anwar
- Coach: Cecep Sunandar
- League: Liga 4
- 2023: 5th in Group A, (South Kalimantan zone)
Home colours	Away colours

Persatuan Sepakbola Banjarbaru (simply known as Persebaru) is an Indonesian football club based in Banjarbaru, the capital city of South Kalimantan. They currently competes in Liga 4.
