= Persemar Martapura =

Indonesian football club

- Full name: Persatuan Sepakbola Martapura
- Nicknames: Intan Martapura (Martapura Diamonds)
- Founded: 1967; 59 years ago
- Ground: Demang Lehman Stadium; Martapura, South Kalimantan
- Capacity: 15.000
- Owner: Askab PSSI Kabupaten Banjar
- Manager: H. Muhammad Rofiqi
- Coach: Ronnie Von de Carvalho
- League: Liga 4
- 2021–22: Liga 3, Round of 64 (National)
Home colours	Away colours

Persatuan Sepakbola Martapura, simply known as Persemar, is an Indonesian football team based in Martapura, South Kalimantan. They currently competes in Liga 4.

== Honours ==
- Liga 3 South Kalimantan
  - Champions (1): 2021
- Liga 4 South Kalimantan
  - Champions (1): 2025–26
