= Demang Lehman Stadium =

Stadium in South Kalimantan, Indonesia

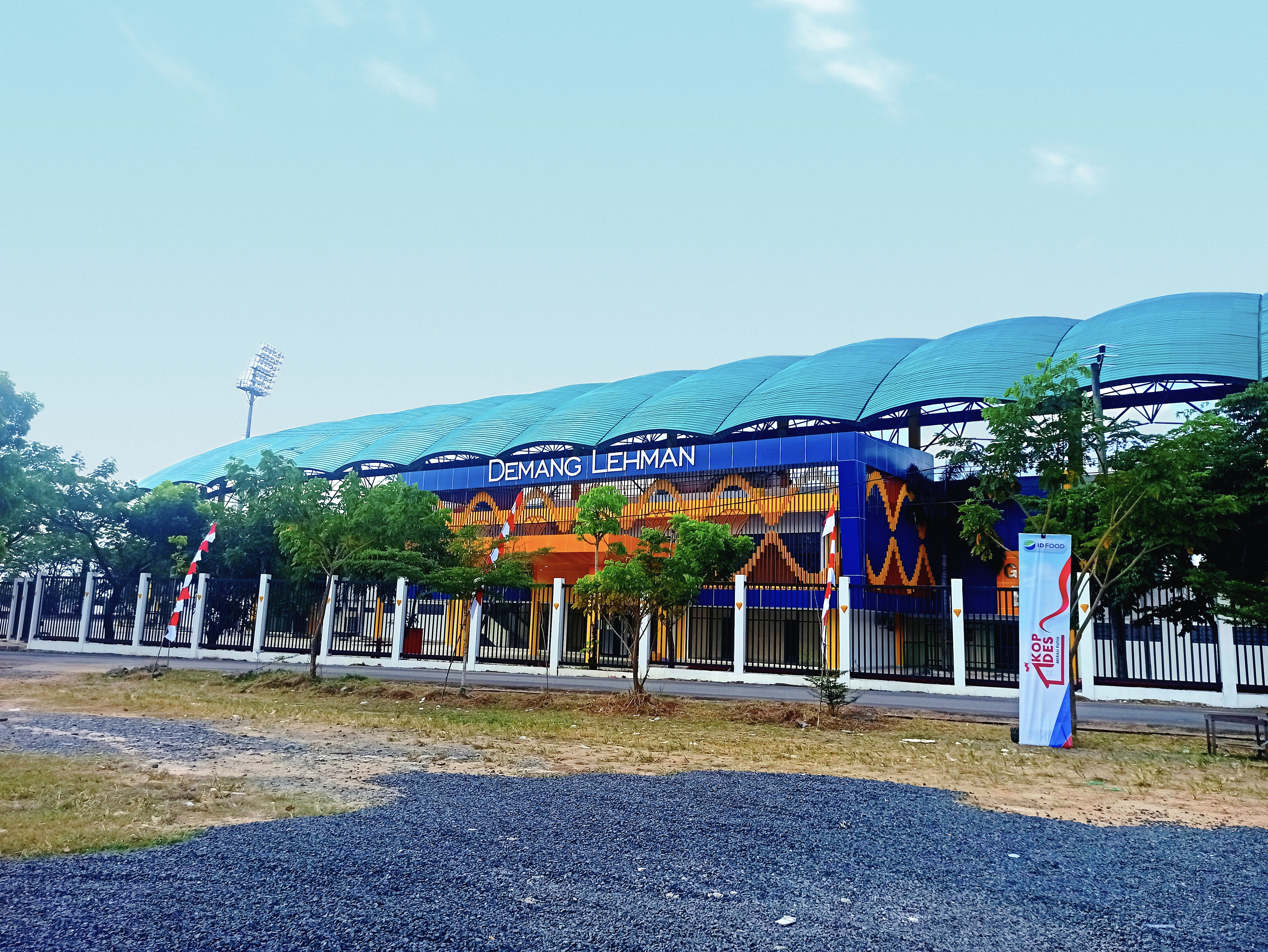

- Location in Kalimantan
- Full name: Demang Lehman Stadium
- Location: Banjar Regency, South Kalimantan, Indonesia
- Coordinates: 3°26′11.7″S 114°52′36.4″E
- Owner: Government of Banjar Regency
- Operator: Government of Banjar Regency
- Capacity: 6,979
- Surface: Zoysia matrella

Construction
- Groundbreaking: 2006
- Opened: 18 January 2013
- Renovated: 2024
- Cost: Rp90 Billion

Tenants
- Barito Putera; Persemar Martapura

Demang Lehman Stadium (Stadion Demang Lehman) previously named the stadium Indrasari, is a multi-purpose stadium located in Indra Sari, Martapura Subdistrict, Banjar Regency, South Kalimantan, Indonesia, which also acted as the homeground of Barito Putera for two seasons ISL during the remodeling of 17th May Stadium.

The stadium was opened on 18 January 2013 by the Regents of Banjar Sultan H. Khairul Saleh. The stadium is owned by the Government of Banjar Regency and the stadium was built in preparation for Banjar District to host the implementation of Provincial Sports Week South Kalimantan in 2013.

The stadium's capacity is 15,000 people. Demang Lehman uses Zoysia matrella type of grass that has been certified to be strong by FIFA. The lighting for night matches has the power of 1.000 lux.

== History ==
The Stadium originally opened to the public in 2013 as a Multi-purpose stadium with a capacity around 6.500.

The renovation started on 18 March 2024 with the cost of Rp108 billion.
