= 17th May Stadium =

Multi-purpose stadium in Banjarmasin, Indonesia

Coordinates: 3°19′0.3″S 114°34′48.5″E

17 May Stadium
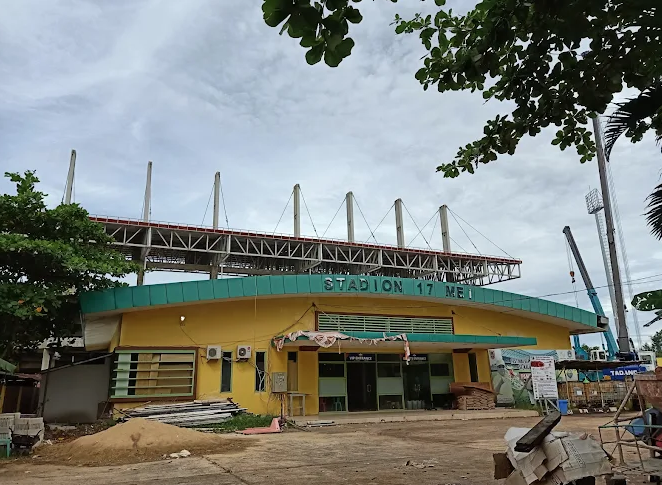
- Interactive map of 17 May Stadium
- Full name: 17th May Stadium
- Location: Banjarmasin, Indonesia
- Owner: South Kalimantan KONI
- Capacity: 12,000
- Surface: Grass

Construction
- Opened: 17 May 1974

Tenants
- Barito Putera; Peseban Banjarmasin

17th May Stadium is a multi-purpose stadium located in Banjarmasin, Indonesia. It is currently used mostly for football matches. The stadium holds 30,000 people. It is the home stadium of Barito Putera and Peseban Banjarmasin, which was considered one of the major football clubs in Indonesia in 1994/95 Premier Division.

== History ==
The stadium was originally opened to the public on 17 May 1974 as a multi-purpose stadium. It has undergone renovations several times. The first upgrade happened in 1984, with a second 1995, a third in 2007, a fourth in 2010 and a fifth in 2013. The sixth renovation began in 2019.
