= Persetala Tanah Laut =

Indonesian football club

- Full name: Persatuan Sepakbola Tanah Laut
- Nickname: Laskar Kijang Hamuk (Mad Deer Warriors)
- Short name: PSTL
- Founded: 1981; 45 years ago
- Ground: Pertasi Kencana Stadium; Tanah Laut, South Kalimantan
- Capacity: 15,000
- Owner: PSSI Tanah Laut
- Manager: Fauzan Arianto
- Coach: Eddie Purwanto
- League: Liga 4
- 2024–25: 3rd, in Second Round Group C (South Kalimantan zone)
Home colours	Away colours

Persatuan Sepakbola Tanah Laut (simply known as Persetala) is an Indonesian football club based in Tanah Laut Regency, South Kalimantan. They currently competes in Liga 4 South Kalimantan zone.

== Honours ==
- Liga 3 South Kalimantan
  - Champions (2): 2019, 2022
