= Barabai =

- Town
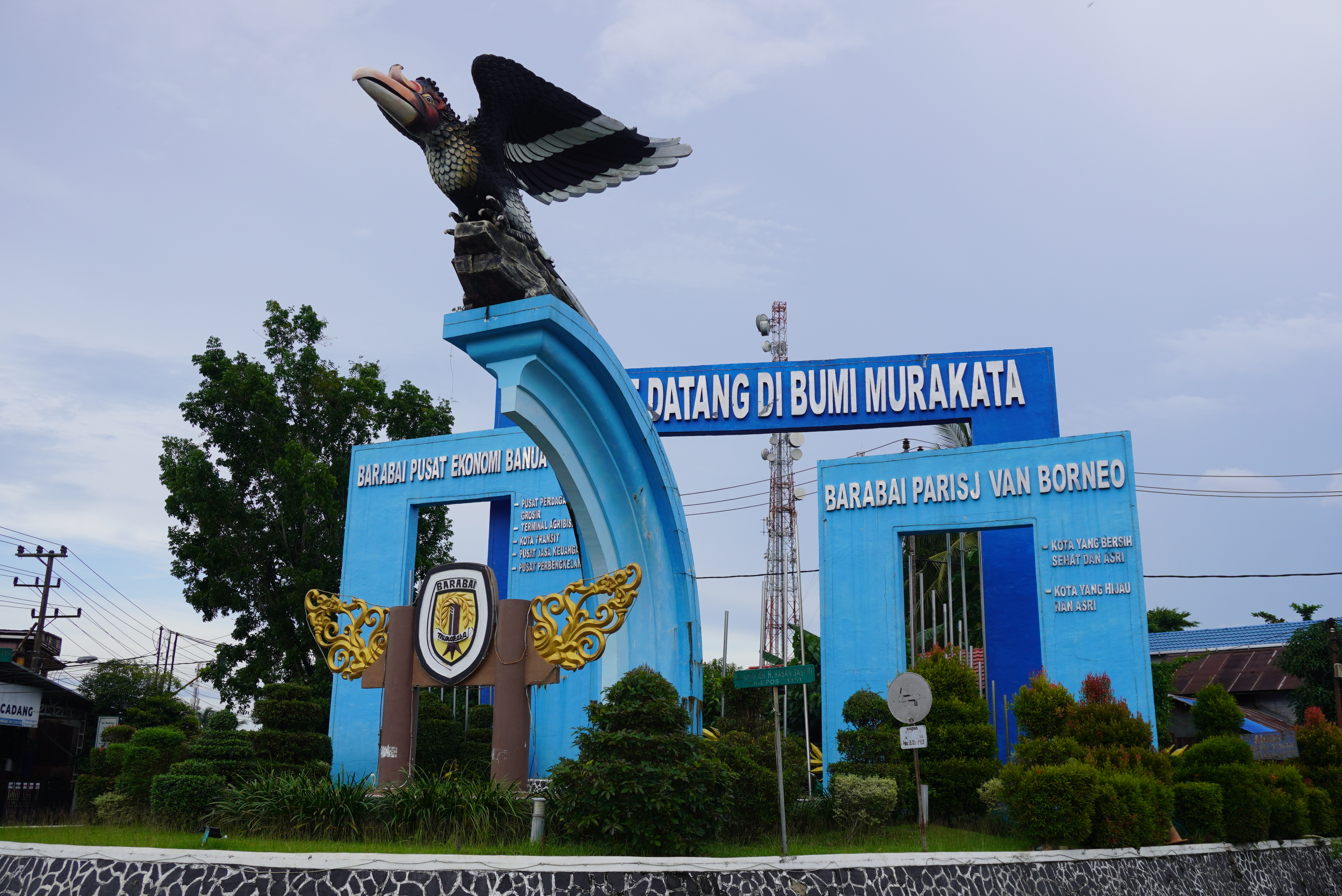
- Sulangking Monument, Barabai

- Location within Kalimantan
- Coordinates: 2°35′S 115°23′E
- Country: Indonesia
- Province: South Kalimantan
- Villages: 18

Area
  - Total: 41.98 km^{2} (16.21 sq mi)

Population (mid 2024 estimate)
  - Total: 55,956
  - Density: 1,333/km^{2} (3,452/sq mi)
- Time zone: UTC+8 (WITA)
- Area code: +62 517

Barabai is a town which serves as the administrative capital of Hulu Sungai Tengah Regency, South Kalimantan, Indonesia. It is located 165 km away from Banjarmasin, the capital of the province. The town is at the feet of the Meratus Mountains that runs in a north–south arc on the island of Borneo.

== Climate ==
Barabai has a tropical savanna climate (Aw) with moderate rainfall in August and September and heavy rainfall in the remaining months.

Climate data for Barabai
| Month | Jan | Feb | Mar | Apr | May | Jun | Jul | Aug | Sep | Oct | Nov | Dec | Year |
|---|---|---|---|---|---|---|---|---|---|---|---|---|---|
| Mean daily maximum °C (°F) | 29.6 (85.3) | 30.1 (86.2) | 30.4 (86.7) | 30.8 (87.4) | 30.9 (87.6) | 30.6 (87.1) | 30.5 (86.9) | 31.2 (88.2) | 31.4 (88.5) | 31.6 (88.9) | 30.9 (87.6) | 30.1 (86.2) | 30.7 (87.2) |
| Daily mean °C (°F) | 26.1 (79.0) | 26.4 (79.5) | 26.7 (80.1) | 26.9 (80.4) | 27.0 (80.6) | 26.6 (79.9) | 26.3 (79.3) | 26.7 (80.1) | 26.9 (80.4) | 27.2 (81.0) | 26.9 (80.4) | 26.5 (79.7) | 26.7 (80.0) |
| Mean daily minimum °C (°F) | 22.7 (72.9) | 22.8 (73.0) | 23.0 (73.4) | 23.1 (73.6) | 23.2 (73.8) | 22.6 (72.7) | 22.1 (71.8) | 22.2 (72.0) | 22.4 (72.3) | 22.8 (73.0) | 22.9 (73.2) | 22.9 (73.2) | 22.7 (72.9) |
| Average rainfall mm (inches) | 256 (10.1) | 285 (11.2) | 235 (9.3) | 214 (8.4) | 194 (7.6) | 130 (5.1) | 141 (5.6) | 113 (4.4) | 114 (4.5) | 146 (5.7) | 264 (10.4) | 318 (12.5) | 2,410 (94.8) |
Source: Climate-Data.org
