= PS Talenta Banua =

Indonesian football club

- Full name: Persatuan Sepakbola Talenta Banua
- Nickname: Laskar Banua Kita
- Founded: 2017; 9 years ago
- Ground: Demang Lehman Stadium
- Capacity: 15,000
- Owner: Donny Gunadi
- Manager: Maulana Mansyur
- Coach: Andi Abu Nawas
- League: Liga 4
- 2023–24: 2nd, (South Kalimantan zone); 5th in Group P, (National)
Home colours	Away colours

Persatuan Sepakbola Talenta Banua (simply known as PS Talenta Banua) is an Indonesian football club based in Martapura, South Kalimantan. They currently competes in Liga 4 South Kalimantan Zone.
