= Perseam Amuntai =

Indonesian football club

Perseam
- Full name: Persatuan Sepakbola Amuntai
- Nicknames: Itik Alabio (Alabio Duck); Laskar Suryanata (Suryanata Warriors)
- Founded: 1964; 62 years ago
- Ground: Karias Stadium; Amuntai, North Hulu Sungai Regency
- Capacity: 5,000
- Owner: PSSI North Hulu Sungai
- Chairman: H. Syahrujani
- Coach: Thamberin
- League: Liga 4
- 2021–22: Semi-final, (Liga 3 South Kalimantan zone)
Home colours	Away colours

Persatuan Sepakbola Amuntai (simply known as Perseam) is an Indonesian football club based in Amuntai, North Hulu Sungai Regency, South Kalimantan. They currently competes in Liga 4 South Kalimantan zone.
