= Peseban Banjarmasin =

- Full name: Perserikatan Sepakbola Banjarmasin
- Nickname: Buaya Kuning (The Yellow Crocodile)
- Short name: PSBN
- Founded: 12 December 1953; 72 years ago
- Ground: 17th May Stadium
- Capacity: 30,000
- Owner: Askot PSSI Banjarmasin
- Head coach: Noor Rasyidi
- League: Liga 4
- 2024–25: 5th, in Group A (South Kalimantan zone)
Home colours	Away colours	Third colours

Perserikatan Sepakbola Banjarmasin or Peseban is an Indonesian professional football club based in Banjarmasin, South Kalimantan. They currently compete in Liga 4.

== History ==
Peseban Banjarmasin is the second oldest club in South Kalimantan. The club was founded in 1953. It competes in Liga 3 since 2017 season. Barito Putera is their main local rival.
