= Balangan Regency =

Regency in South Kalimantan, Indonesia

Coordinates: 2.3231°S 115.6292°E

Balangan Regency Kabupaten Balangan
- Regency

Other transcription(s)
  - Jawi: كابوڤاتين بالڠن
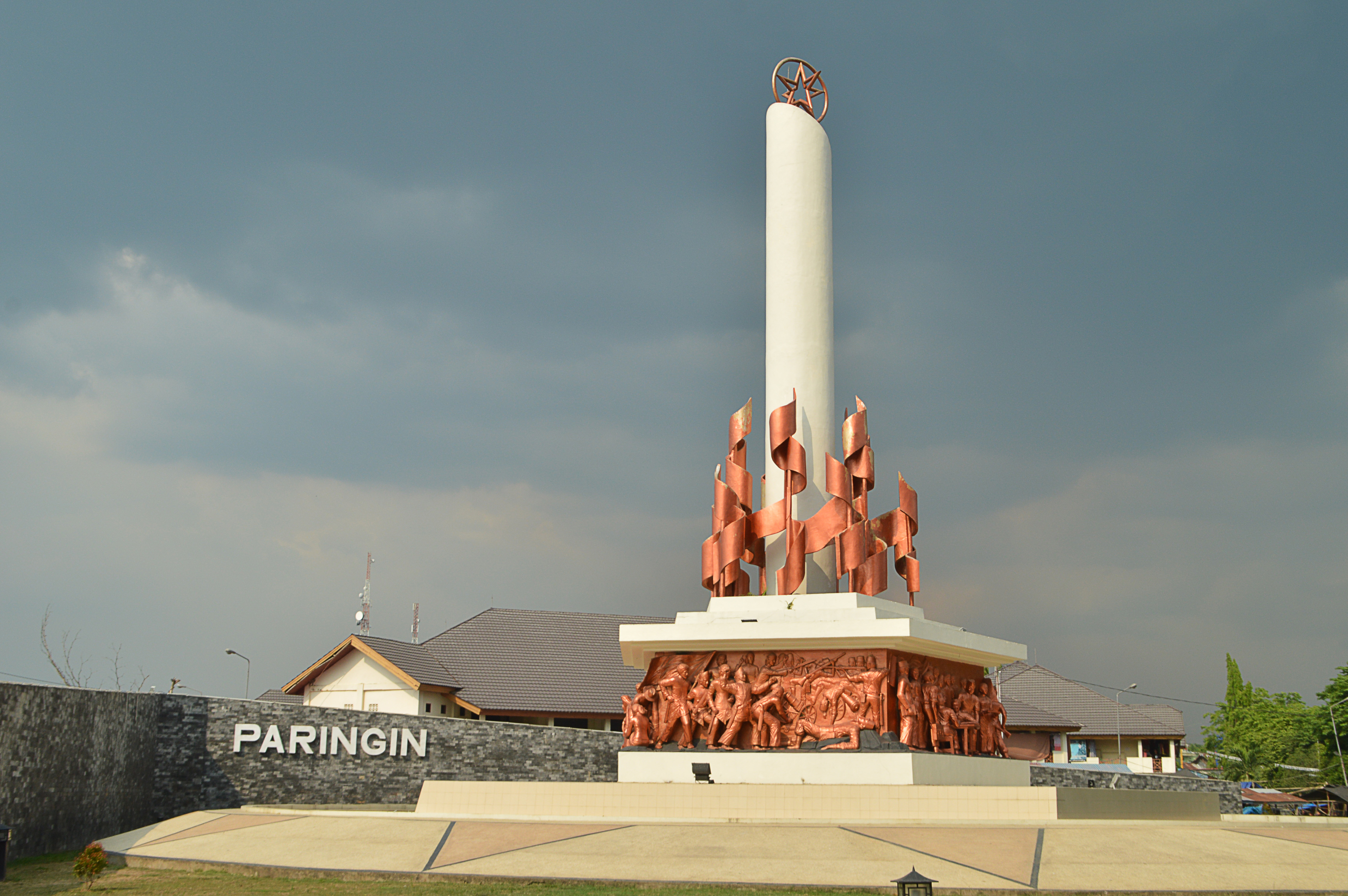
- Perjuangan Monument, Paringin

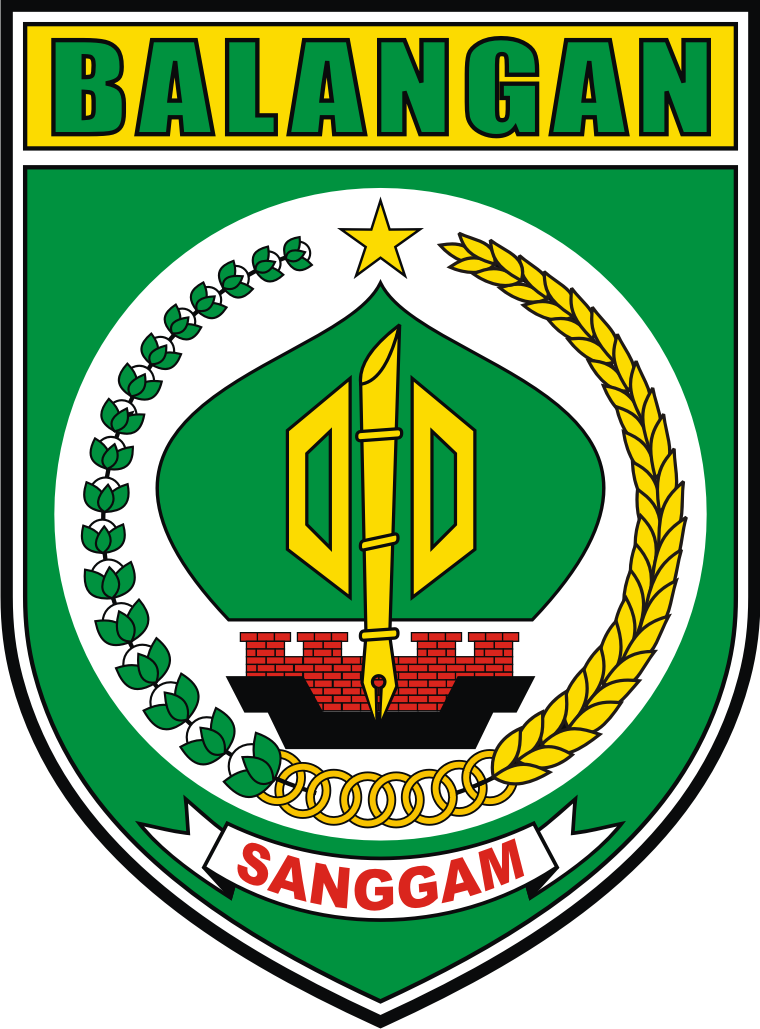
- Coat of arms
- Motto: Sanggam "Sanggup Bagawi Gasan Masyarakat" (Willing To Work for the Sake of the People)
- Country: Indonesia
- Province: South Kalimantan
- Capital: Paringin

Government
  - Regent: Abdul Hadi
  - Vice Regent: Akhmad Fauzi

Area
  - Total: 1,829 km^{2} (706 sq mi)

Population (mid 2025 estimate)
  - Total: 140,746
  - Density: 76.95/km^{2} (199.3/sq mi)
- Time zone: UTC+8 (WITA)
- Website: balangankab.go.id

Balangan Regency is one of the regencies in the Indonesian province of South Kalimantan. It was created on 25 February 2003 from what were previously the eastern districts of North Hulu Sungai Regency. It now covers a land area of 1,829 km^{2}, and had a population of 112,430 at the 2010 Census and 130,355 at the 2020 Census; the official estimate as of mid 2025 was 140,746 (consisting of 71,472 males and 69,274 females). The administrative centre is in the town of Paringin.

== Administrative districts ==
Balangan Regency consists of eight districts (kecamatan), tabulated below with their areas and population totals from the 2010 Census, and 2020 Census, together with the official estimates for mid 2025. The table also includes the location of the district administrative centres, the number of administrative villages in each district (a total of 154 rural desa and 3 urban kelurahan), and its postal codes.

Kode Wilayah	Name of District (kecamatan)	Area in km^{2}	Pop'n Census 2010	Pop'n Census 2020	Pop'n Estimate mid 2024	Admin centre	No. of villages	Post codes
63.11.05	Lampihong	104	15,748	18,282	20,010	Lampihong Kiri	27	71661
63.11.04	Batu Mandi	129	16,129	18,831	20,500	Batumandi	18	71663
63.11.03	Awayan	103	12,048	13,775	15,000	Putat Basiun	23	71664
63.11.08	Tebing Tinggi	259	5,918	7,073	7,620	Tebing Tinggi	12	71667
63.11.06	Paringin	136	16,844	19,701	20,880	Paringin Kota	16 ^{(a)}	71662 ^{(b)}
63.11.07	Paringin Selatan (South Paringin)	66	11,436	15,462	17,610	Batu Piring	16 ^{(c)}	71662 ^{(d)}
63.11.01	Juai	260	15,695	16,801	17,710	Mungkur Uyam	21	71665
63.11.02	Halong	772	18,612	20,430	21,430	Halong	24	71666
	Totals	1,829	112,430	130,355	140,746	Paringin Kota	157	

Notes: (a) including two kelurahan - Paringin Kota and Paringin Timur. (b) except the villages of Mangkayahu (postcode of 71614) and Layap (postcode of 71616).
(c) including one kelurahan - Batu Piring. (d) except the village of Bungin (postcode 71617) and the town of Batu Piring (postcode 71618).

== Climate ==
Paringin, the seat of the regency has a tropical rainforest climate (Af) with heavy rainfall year-round.

Climate data for Paringin
Month	Jan	Feb	Mar	Apr	May	Jun	Jul	Aug	Sep	Oct	Nov	Dec	Year
Mean daily maximum °C (°F)	29.5 (85.1)	30.0 (86.0)	30.3 (86.5)	30.6 (87.1)	30.6 (87.1)	30.3 (86.5)	30.2 (86.4)	30.9 (87.6)	31.1 (88.0)	31.3 (88.3)	30.6 (87.1)	30.0 (86.0)	30.5 (86.8)
Daily mean °C (°F)	26.0 (78.8)	26.3 (79.3)	26.6 (79.9)	26.8 (80.2)	26.8 (80.2)	26.4 (79.5)	26.1 (79.0)	26.6 (79.9)	26.7 (80.1)	27.0 (80.6)	26.7 (80.1)	26.4 (79.5)	26.5 (79.8)
Mean daily minimum °C (°F)	22.6 (72.7)	22.7 (72.9)	22.9 (73.2)	23.0 (73.4)	23.1 (73.6)	22.5 (72.5)	22.1 (71.8)	22.3 (72.1)	22.4 (72.3)	22.7 (72.9)	22.8 (73.0)	22.8 (73.0)	22.7 (72.8)
Average rainfall mm (inches)	274 (10.8)	265 (10.4)	249 (9.8)	219 (8.6)	195 (7.7)	152 (6.0)	129 (5.1)	102 (4.0)	126 (5.0)	148 (5.8)	240 (9.4)	308 (12.1)	2,407 (94.7)
Source: Climate-Data.org
