= Tanah Bumbu Regency =

Regency in South Kalimantan, Indonesia

Coordinates: 3.4541°S 115.7037°E

Tanah Bumbu Regency Kabupaten Tanah Bumbu
- Regency

Other transcription(s)
  - Jawi: كابوڤاتين تانه بومبو
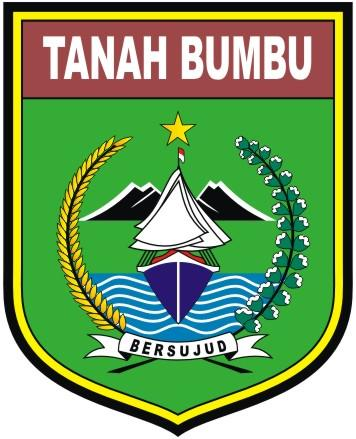
- Coat of arms
- Motto: Bersujud (Kneeling to God)
- Country: Indonesia
- Province: South Kalimantan
- Capital: Batulicin
- Established: 8 April 2003

Government
  - Regent: Andi Rudi Latif
  - Vice Regent: Bahsanuddin

Area
  - Total: 4,884.86 km^{2} (1,886.05 sq mi)

Population (mid 2025 estimate)
  - Total: 362,460
  - Density: 74.201/km^{2} (192.18/sq mi)
- Time zone: UTC+8 (WITA)
- Area code: 0518
- Website: tanahbumbukab.go.id

Tanah Bumbu is one of the regencies in the Indonesian province of South Kalimantan. Tanah Bumbu originally stretched north to the border with Paser Regency, and encompassed all of that part of Kotabaru Regency situated on the mainland of Kalimantan, but the southern part of Tanah Bumbu was split off on 25 February 2003 to form a separate regency, following dissatisfaction on the Kalimantan mainland territories with administration from Laut Island (the larger northern part of the original Tanah Bumbu remains within Kotabaru Regency).

The present Regency covers an area of 4,884.86 km^{2} and had a population of 267,929 at the 2010 Census and 322,646 at the 2020 Census; the latest official estimate (as at mid 2025) is 362,460 (comprising 185,673 males and 176,787 females). The regency's capital is the town of Batulicin, which had 9,066 inhabitants as at mid 2024.

== Administrative districts ==
At the 2020 Census Tanah Bumbu Regency was divided into ten districts (kecamatan), but two new districts have subsequently been added - Kusan Tengah from part of Kusan Hilir District, and Teluk Kepayang from part of Kusan Hulu District. The twelve districts are listed below with their areas and their 2010 and 2020 Census populations, together with the official estimates as at mid 2025. The table also includes the locations of the district administrative centres, the number of administrative villages in each district (totalling 144 rural desa and 5 urban kelurahan), and its post code.

Kode Wilayah	Name of District (kecamatan)	Area in km^{2}	Pop'n Census 2010	Pop'n Census 2020	Pop'n Estimate mid 2025	Admin centre	No. of villages	Post code
63.10.02	Kusan Hilir (Lower Kusan)	73.41	42,829	46,924	35,177	Kota Pagatan	22 ^{(a)}	72273
63.10.11	Kusan Tengah (Central Kusan)	215.30	^{(b)}	^{(b)}	16,431	Saring Sungai Bubu	13	72273
63.10.03	Sungai Loban (Loban River)	382.64	18,867	24,308	27,135	Sari Mulya	17	72274
63.10.04	Satui	965.98	49,252	54,925	60,079	Sungai Danau	16	72276
63.10.09	Angsana	191.50	16,347	22,571	25,258	Angsana	9	72275
63.10.05	Kusan Hulu (Upper Kusan)	216.37	18,910	20,415	12,569	Binawara	11	72270
63.10.10	Kuranji	115.32	7,558	10,120	11,093	Giri Mulya	7	72272: 72274
63.10.12	Teluk Kepayang (Kepayang Bay)	1,168.40	^{(c)}	^{(c)}	10,287	Teluk Kepayang	10	72270
63.10.01	Batulicin ^{(d)}	133.61	13,430	21,036	24,594	Batulicin	9 ^{(e)}	72211: 72273
63.10.07	Karang Bintang	203.41	15,814	20,089	22,027	Karang Bintang	11	72210
63.10.06	Simpang Empat ^{(f)} ^{(g)}	292.41	67,909	78,899	90,880	Kampung Baru	12 ^{(h)}	72211 -72213
63.10.08	Mantewe	926.51	16,933	23,359	26,930	Mantewe	12	72211
	Totals	4,884.86	267,929	322,646	362,460	Batulicin	149	

Notes: (a) includes one kelurahan - Kota Pagatan (with 3,288 inhabitants as at 2024)..
(b) the figure for the new Kusan Tengah District is included with that for Kusan Hilir District, from which it was cut out.
(c) the figure for the new Teluk Kepayang District is included with that for Kusan Hulu District, from which it was cut out.
(d) includes the three offshore islands of Suwangi, Anak Suwangi and Sungai Dua.
(e) includes 2 kelurahan - Batulicin (with 9,066 inhabitants as at 2024) and Gunung Tinggi (2,832). (f) not to be confused with the district of the same name in Banjar Regency.
(g) includes the three offshore islands of Burung, Hantu and Tampakan. (h) includes 2 kelurahan - Kampung Baru (with 10,324 inhabitants as at 2024) and Tungkaran Pangeran (7,786).
