= Barito Kuala Regency =

Regency in South Kalimantan, Indonesia

Coordinates: 3.0833°S 114.6167°E

Barito Kuala Regency Kabupaten Barito Kuala
- Regency
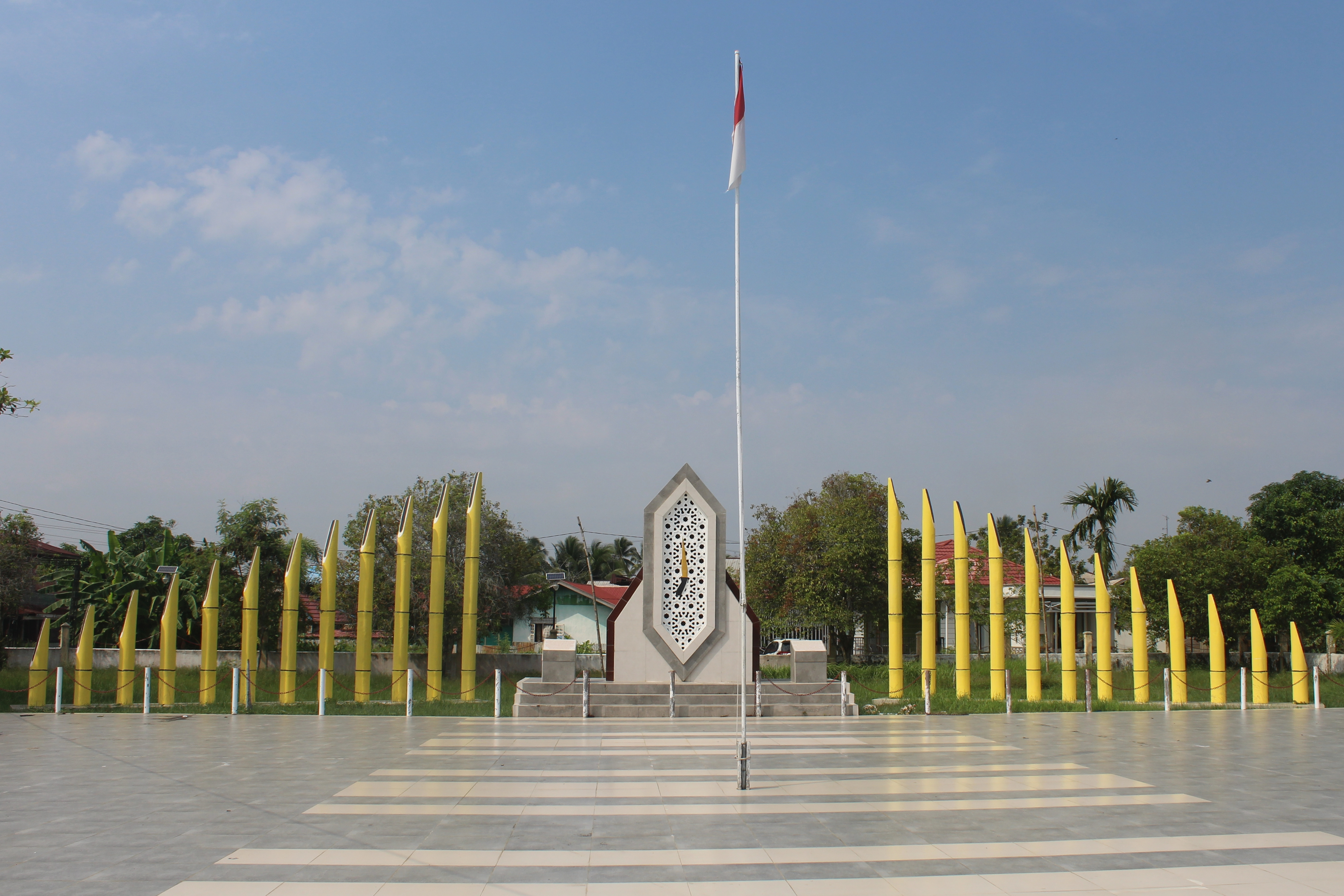
- Heroes cemetery at Marabahan

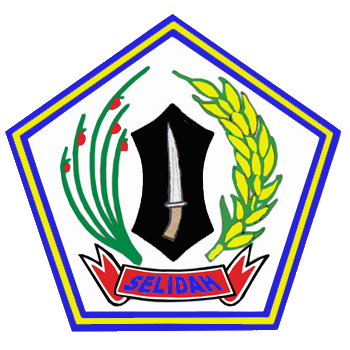
- Coat of arms
- Motto: Selidah (One Tongue)
- Country: Indonesia
- Province: South Kalimantan
- Capital: Marabahan

Government
  - Regent: Bahrul Ilmi
  - Vice Regent: Herman Susilo

Area
  - Total: 2,425.83 km^{2} (936.62 sq mi)

Population (mid 2025 estimate)
  - Total: 334,958
  - Density: 138.080/km^{2} (357.625/sq mi)
- Time zone: UTC+8 (WITA)
- Area code: +62 511
- Website: baritokualakab.go.id

Barito Kuala Regency is one of the regencies (kabupaten) in the Indonesian province of South Kalimantan. It is situated in the southwest of the province, bordering Central Kalimantan province to its immediate west and separated from Banjarmasin city and other regencies of the province to its east by the lower reaches of the Barito River. The regency's land area is 2,425.83 km^{2}, and the population was 276,147 at the 2010 Census and 313,021 at the 2020 Census; the official estimate (as at mid 2025) was 334,958 (comprising 169,297 males and 164,998 females). The capital is the town of Marabahan Kota.

== Administrative districts ==
The Regency is divided into seventeen districts (Indonesian: kecamatan), tabulated below with their areas and population totals from the 2010 Census and 2120 Census, together with the official estimates for mid 2025. The three most southern (Tabunganen, Tamban and Mekarsari) and the nine more geographically central of the districts lie within the official Banjarmasin metropolitan area; the other five districts (Barambai, Bakumpai, Marabahan, Tabukan and Kuripan) lie to the north outside the metropolitan area. The table also includes the locations of the district administrative centres, the number of administrative villages in each district (a total of 195 rural desa and 6 urban kelurahan), and its postal codes.

Kode Wilayah	Name of District (kecamatan)	Area in km^{2}	Pop'n Census 2010	Pop'n Census 2020	Pop'n Estimate mid 2025	Admin centre	No. of villages	Post codes
63.04.01	Tabunganen ^{(a)}	228.76	19,143	20,045	21,270	Tabunganen Kecil	14	70567
63.04.02	Tamban	170.91	31,115	31,967	33,513	Purwosari I	16	70566
63.04.13	Mekarsari	134.44	16,312	17,797	19,070	Tamban Raya	9	70568
63.04.03	Anjir Pasar	108.19	15,388	17,013	18,229	Anjir Pasar Kota I	15	70565
63.04.04	Anjir Muara	91.95	19,456	21,918	23,652	Anjir Muara Kota	15	70564
63.04.05	Alalak	102.06	51,403	62,833	68,000	Handil Bakti	18 ^{(b)}	70582
63.04.06	Mandastana	115.52	14,012	17,497	18,595	Puntik Luar	14	70580
63.04.17	Jejangkit	165.35	6,047	6,606	6,999	Jejangkit Pasar	7	70581
63.04.08	Belawang	72.13	12,717	13,627	14,627	Belawang	13	70563
63.04.16	Wanaraya	156.27	12,407	14,342	15,540	Kolam Kiri	13	70560
63.04.14	Barambai	163.11	13,971	15,672	16,689	Barambai	11	70562
63.04.07	Rantau Badauh	129.12	14,132	16,464	17,370	Sungai Gampa	9	70561
63.04.09	Cerbon	118.58	8,403	9,969	10,483	Bantuil	8	70571
63.04.10	Bakumpai	182.00	9,321	10,537	11,452	Lepasan	9 ^{(c)}	70512 & 70513
63.04.15	Marabahan	177.36	18,907	21,915	23,551	Marabahan Kota	10 ^{(d)}	70511 - 70513
63.04.12	Tabukan	168.65	8,097	9,030	9,729	Teluk Tamba	11	70553
63.04.11	Kuripan	141.44	5,316	5,789	6,189	Rimbun Tulang	9	70552
	Totals	2,425.83	276,147	313,021	334,958	Marabahan Kota	201	

Notes: (a) including three small offshore or riverine islands.
(b) including three kelurahan - Berangas (with 3,828 inhabitants in mid 2024), Berangas Barat (3,670) and Handil Bakti (7,710), while the largest desa was Selamgat Dalam (with 15,743 inhabitants).
(c) including one kelurahan - Lepasan (with 3,486 inhabitants in mid 2024).
(d) including two kelurahan - Marabahan Kota (with 8,380 inhabitants in mid 2024) and Ulu Benteng (7,705).

== Climate ==
Marabahan, the seat of the regency, has a tropical rainforest climate (Af) with heavy rainfall from October to May and moderate rainfall from June to September.

Climate data for Marabahan
Month	Jan	Feb	Mar	Apr	May	Jun	Jul	Aug	Sep	Oct	Nov	Dec	Year
Mean daily maximum °C (°F)	29.6 (85.3)	30.2 (86.4)	30.5 (86.9)	31.2 (88.2)	31.2 (88.2)	30.9 (87.6)	31.2 (88.2)	31.9 (89.4)	32.3 (90.1)	32.2 (90.0)	31.2 (88.2)	30.3 (86.5)	31.1 (87.9)
Daily mean °C (°F)	26.0 (78.8)	26.5 (79.7)	26.7 (80.1)	27.1 (80.8)	27.1 (80.8)	26.6 (79.9)	26.6 (79.9)	26.9 (80.4)	27.3 (81.1)	27.3 (81.1)	27.0 (80.6)	26.6 (79.9)	26.8 (80.3)
Mean daily minimum °C (°F)	22.5 (72.5)	22.8 (73.0)	22.9 (73.2)	23.1 (73.6)	23.1 (73.6)	22.3 (72.1)	22.0 (71.6)	22.0 (71.6)	22.3 (72.1)	22.5 (72.5)	22.8 (73.0)	22.9 (73.2)	22.6 (72.7)
Average rainfall mm (inches)	324 (12.8)	304 (12.0)	302 (11.9)	228 (9.0)	193 (7.6)	124 (4.9)	105 (4.1)	100 (3.9)	111 (4.4)	142 (5.6)	227 (8.9)	299 (11.8)	2,459 (96.9)
Source: Climate-Data.org
