= Central Hulu Sungai Regency =

Regency in South Kalimantan, Indonesia

Central Hulu Sungai Regency Kabupaten Hulu Sungai Tengah
- Regency

Other transcription(s)
  - Jawi: كابوڤاتين هولو سوڠاي تڠه
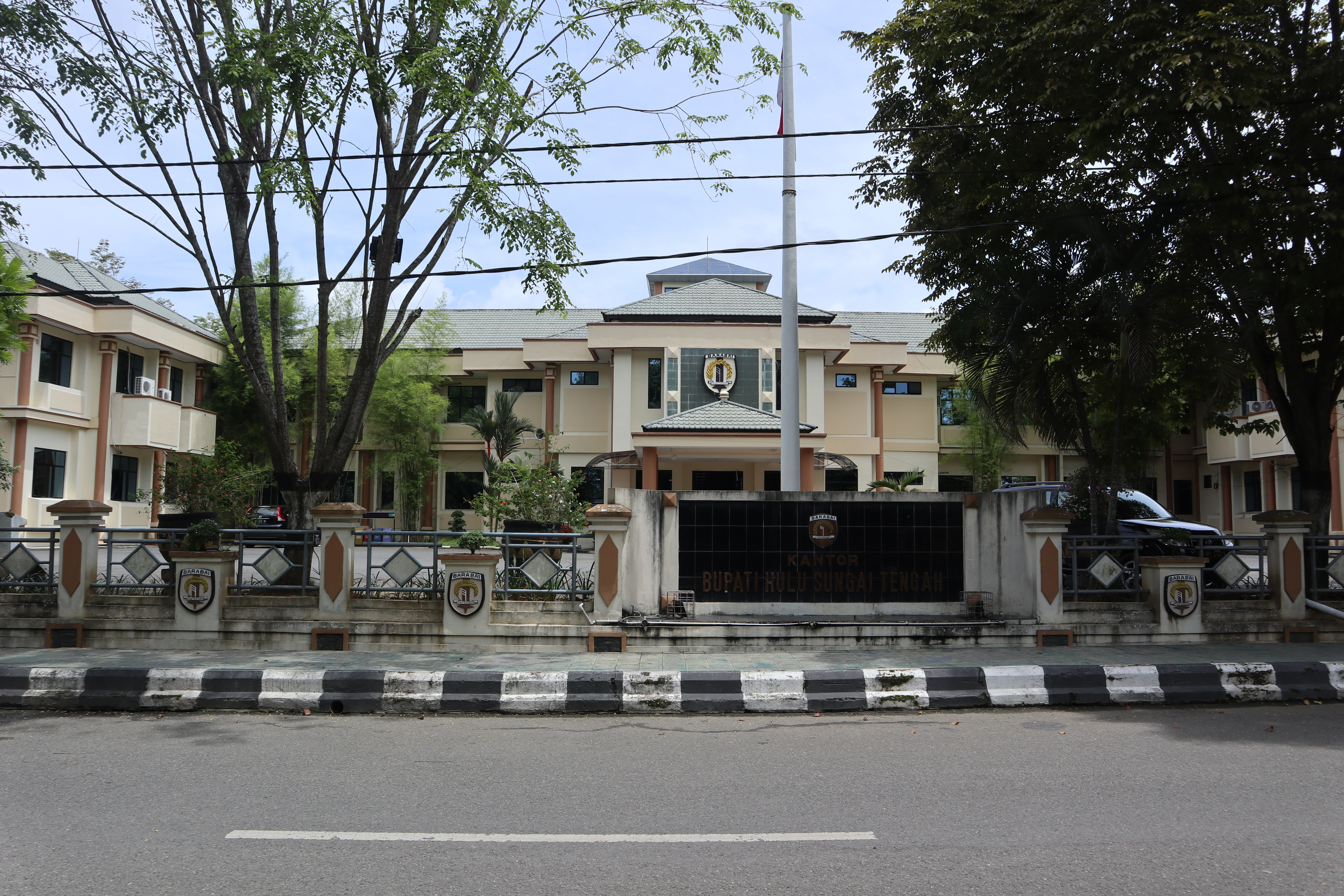
- Central Hulu Sungai Regency government office

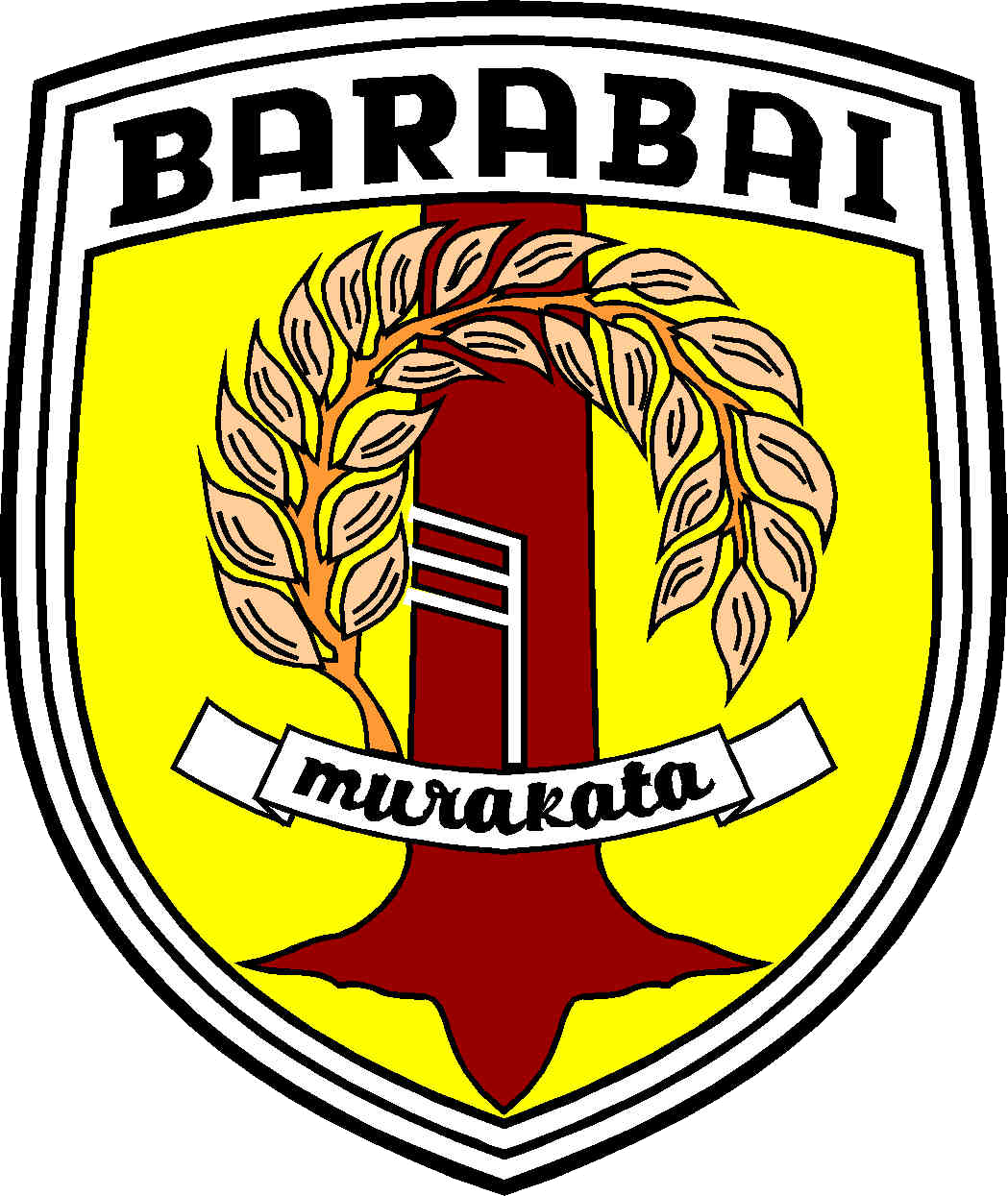
- Coat of arms
- Motto: Murakata "Mufakat, Rakat, Seiya-sekata" (Consensus, United, and Unanimous)
- Location within South Kalimantan

- Location in Kalimantan and Indonesia Central Hulu Sungai Regency (Indonesia)
- Coordinates: 2°35′S 115°23′E
- Country: Indonesia
- Province: South Kalimantan
- Capital: Barabai
- Established: 24 December 1959

Government
  - Regent: Samsul Rizal
  - Vice Regent: Gusti Rosyadi Elmi

Area
  - Total: 1,573.40 km^{2} (607.49 sq mi)

Population (mid 2024 estimate)
  - Total: 269,599
  - Density: 171.348/km^{2} (443.789/sq mi)
- Time zone: UTC+8 (ICST)
- Area code: (+62) 517
- Website: hulusungaitengahkab.go.id

Central Hulu Sungai Regency is one of the regencies in the Indonesian province of South Kalimantan. The area is 1,573.40 km^{2} and the population was 243,460 at the 2010 Census and 258,721 at the 2020 Census; the official estimate as at mid 2024 was 269,599 (comprising 135,767 males and 133,832 females). The administrative centre is the town of Barabai.

== Administrative districts ==
Central Hulu Sungai Regency is divided into eleven districts (kecamatan), listed below with their areas and their populations at the 2010 Census and 2020 Census, together with the official estimates as at mid 2024. The table includes the locations of the district administrative centres, the number of administrative villages in each district (a total of 161 rural desa and 8 urban kelurahan), and its post code.

Kode Wilayah	Name of District (kecamatan)	Area in km^{2}	Pop'n Census 2010	Pop'n Census 2020	Pop'n Estimate mid 2024	Admin centre	No. of villages	Post code
63.07.01	Haruyan	104.81	20,468	21,635	22,484	Haruyan	17	71363
63.07.02	Batu Benawa	58.16	18,360	19,699	20,707	Pagat	14	71371
63.07.09	Hantakan	227.56	11,648	12,393	13,098	Hantakan	12	71372
63.07.07	Batang Alai Selatan (South Batang Alai)	80.51	21,879	23,560	24,558	Birayang	19 ^{(a)}	71381
63.07.10	Batang Alai Timur (East Batang Alai)	565.24	6,989	7,099	7,392	Tandilang	11	71382
63.07.06	Barabai	41.98	52,662	55,754	55,956	Barabai Utara	18 ^{(b)}	71311 -71315
63.07.03	Labuan Amas Selatan (South Labuan Amas)	90.40	26,256	28,436	30,270	Pantai Hambawang; Timur	18 ^{(c)}	71361
63.07.04	Labuan Amas Utara (North Labuan Amas)	166.22	27,321	27,023	28,734	Kasarangan	16	71362
63.07.05	Pandawan	105.37	30,768	34,103	35,921	Pandawan	21	71352
63.07.08	Batang Alai Utara (North Batang Alai)	71.52	17,288	18,040	19,108	Ilung	14	71391
63.07.11	Limpasu	61.63	9,821	10,979	11,371	Limpasu	9	71392
	Totals	1,573.40	243,460	258,721	269,599	Barabai	169	

Notes: (a) includes one kelurahan - Birayang. (b) includes 6 kelurahan - Barabai Barat, Barabai Darat, Barabai Selatan, Barabai Timur, Barabai Utara and Bukat. (c) includes one kelurahan - Pantai Hambawang Barat.
