= North Hulu Sungai Regency =

Regency in South Kalimantan, Indonesia

Coordinates: 2.4500°S 115.1333°E

North Hulu Sungai Regency Kabupaten Hulu Sungai Utara
- Regency

Other transcription(s)
  - Jawi: كابوڤاتين هولو سوڠاي اوتارا
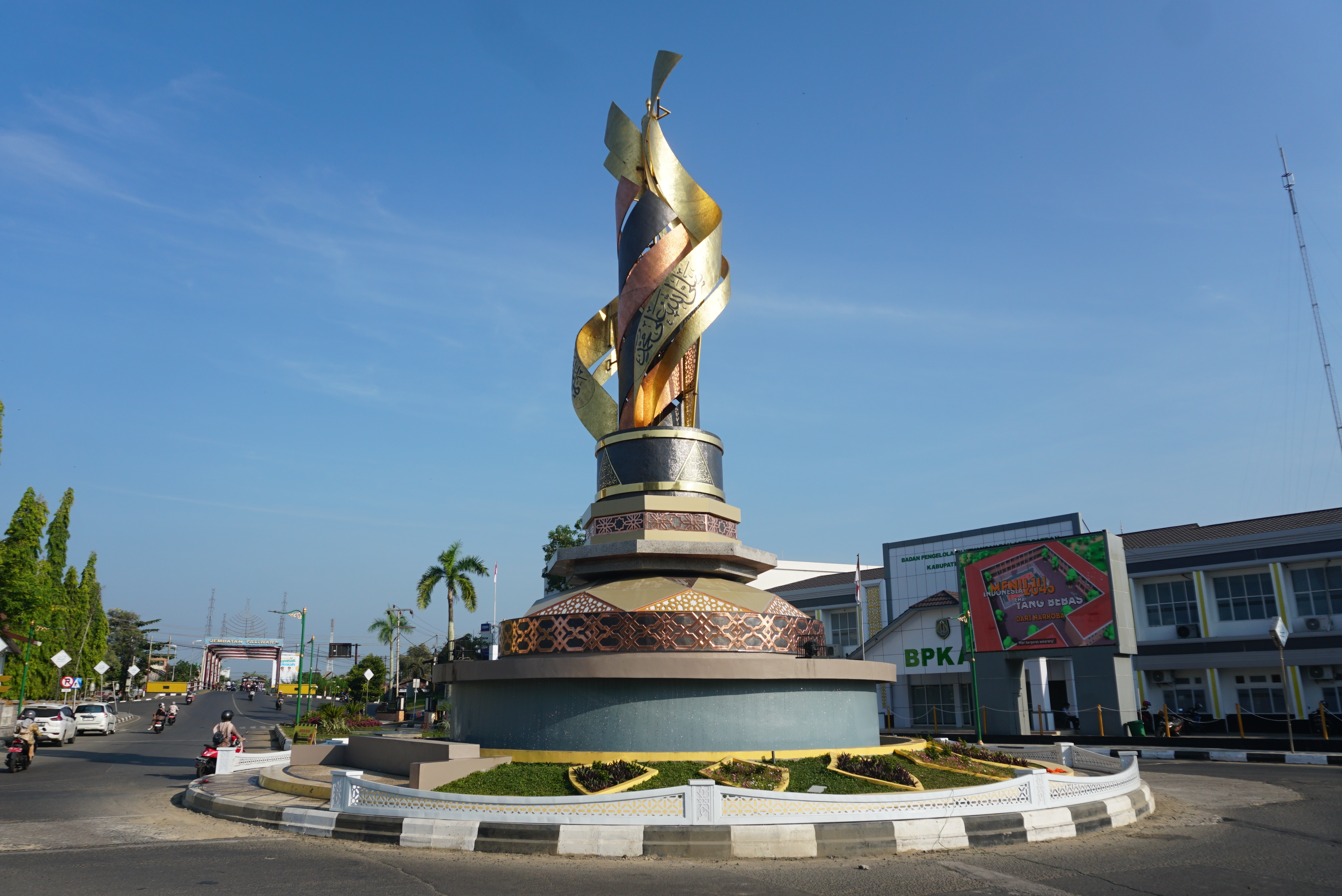
- Shalawat Monument, Amuntai

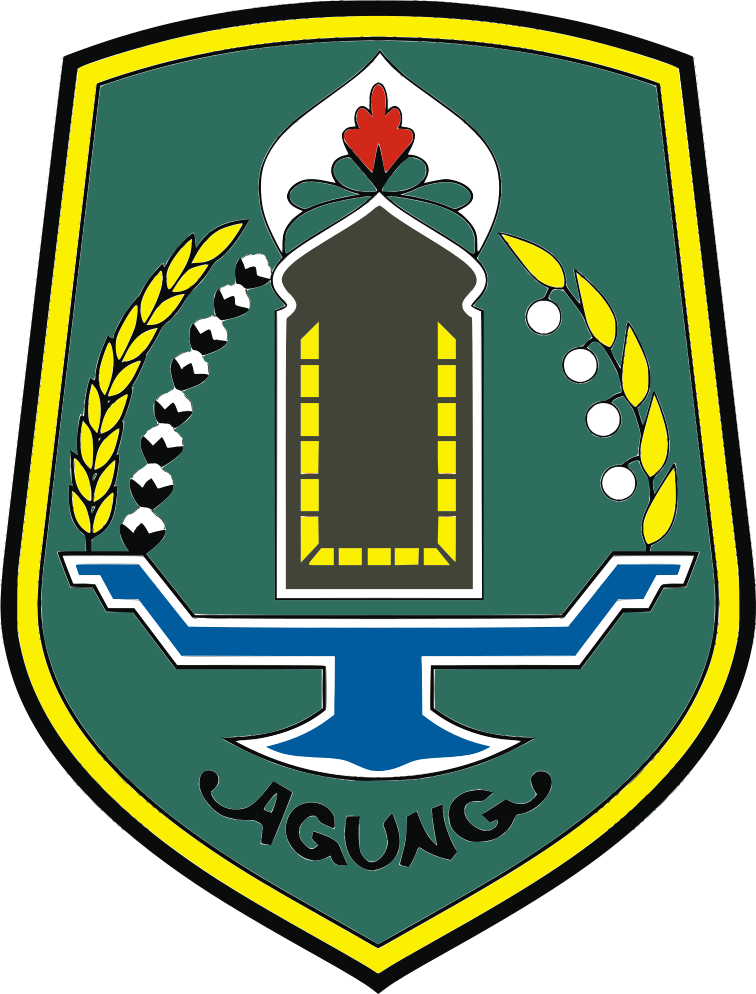
- Coat of arms
- Motto: Agung (Great)
- Country: Indonesia
- Province: South Kalimantan
- Capital: Amuntai

Government
  - Regent: Sahrujani
  - Vice Regent: Hero Setiawan

Area
  - Total: 907.72 km^{2} (350.47 sq mi)

Population (mid 2024 estimate)
  - Total: 238,250
  - Density: 262.47/km^{2} (679.80/sq mi)
- Time zone: UTC+8 (WITA)
- Area code: +62 527
- Website: hsu.go.id/web/

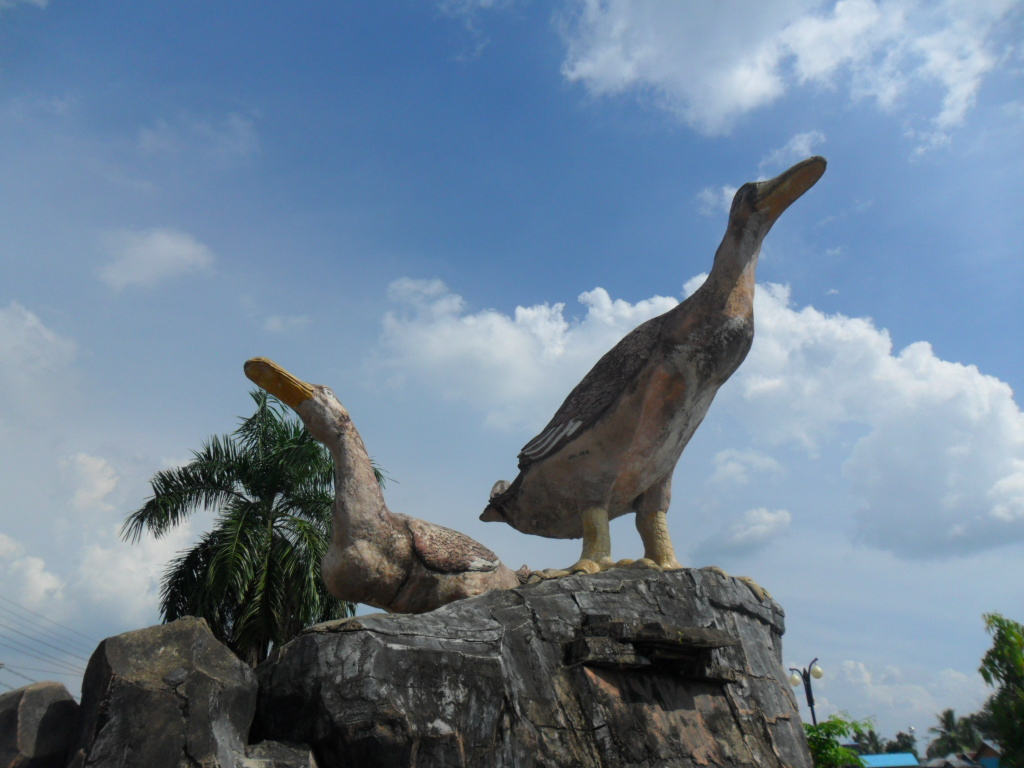
Itik Alabio Monument as local mascot.

North Hulu Sungai Regency is one of the regencies in the Indonesian province of South Kalimantan. It was created from the bifurcation of the original Hulu Sungai Regency and formerly covered a much larger area in the north of the province, but on 14 July 1965 the northern districts were split off to create a separate Tabalong Regency, and on 25 February 2003 the eastern districts were split off to create a separate Balangan Regency. It now has a land area of 907.72 km^{2}, and had a population of 209,246 at the 2010 Census and 226,727 at the 2020 Census; the official estimate as of mid-2024 was 238,250 (comprising 118,822 males and 119,428 females). The capital of the regency is the town of Amuntai.

== Administrative districts ==
North Hulu Sungai Regency is divided into ten districts (kecamatan), listed below with their areas and their populations at the 2010 Census and 2020 Census, together with the official estimates as of mid-2024. The table includes the locations of the district administrative centres, the number of administrative villages in each district (a total of 214 rural desa and 5 urban kelurahan - the latter all in Amuntai Tengah District), and its postcode.

Kode Wilayah	Name of District (kecamatan)	Area in km^{2}	Pop'n Census 2010	Pop'n Census 2020	Pop'n Estimate mid 2024	Admin centre	No. of villages	Post code
63.08.01	Danau Panggang	136.24	19,593	20,514	21,536	Danau Panggang	16	71453
63.08.09	Paminggir	192.77	7,377	8,000	8,470	Paminggir	7	71451
63.08.02	Babirik	82.01	17,833	19,402	20,556	Babirik	23	71454
63.08.03	Sungai Pandan (Pandan River)	59.92	25,905	27,639	29,297	Alabio	33	71455
63.08.10	Sungai Tabukan (Tabukan River)	22.25	13,801	14,828	15,509	Sungai Tabukan	17	71456
63.08.04	Amuntai Selatan (South Amuntai)	149.99	26,466	30,153	32,075	Telaga Silaba	30	71452
63.08.05	Amuntai Tengah (Central Amuntai)	77.09	47,961	50,609	52,477	Amuntai	29 ^{(a)}	71412 -71419
63.08.07	Banjang	110.64	16,185	18,693	19,127	Banjang	20	71416
63.08.06	Amuntai Utara (North Amuntai)	37.85	19,955	20,510	21,788	Teluk Daun	26	71471
63.08.08	Haur Gading	38.96	14,170	16,379	17,415	Sungai Limas	18	71472
	Totals	907.72	209,246	226,727	238,250	Amuntai	219	

Note: (a) including the 5 kelurahan of Antasari, Kebun Sari, Murung Sari, Paliwara and Sungai Malang.

== Climate ==
Amuntai has a tropical rainforest climate (Af) with moderate rainfall from July to September and heavy rainfall in the remaining months.

Climate data for Amuntai
Month	Jan	Feb	Mar	Apr	May	Jun	Jul	Aug	Sep	Oct	Nov	Dec	Year
Mean daily maximum °C (°F)	29.6 (85.3)	30.1 (86.2)	30.4 (86.7)	30.8 (87.4)	30.9 (87.6)	30.5 (86.9)	30.6 (87.1)	31.2 (88.2)	31.4 (88.5)	31.5 (88.7)	30.7 (87.3)	30.1 (86.2)	30.6 (87.2)
Daily mean °C (°F)	26.1 (79.0)	26.4 (79.5)	26.6 (79.9)	26.9 (80.4)	27.1 (80.8)	26.5 (79.7)	26.4 (79.5)	26.7 (80.1)	26.9 (80.4)	27.1 (80.8)	26.7 (80.1)	26.5 (79.7)	26.7 (80.0)
Mean daily minimum °C (°F)	22.6 (72.7)	22.8 (73.0)	22.9 (73.2)	23.1 (73.6)	23.3 (73.9)	22.6 (72.7)	22.2 (72.0)	22.3 (72.1)	22.5 (72.5)	22.7 (72.9)	22.8 (73.0)	22.9 (73.2)	22.7 (72.9)
Average rainfall mm (inches)	274 (10.8)	273 (10.7)	248 (9.8)	217 (8.5)	193 (7.6)	133 (5.2)	122 (4.8)	97 (3.8)	113 (4.4)	135 (5.3)	233 (9.2)	300 (11.8)	2,338 (91.9)
Source: Climate-Data.org
