= Football in Indonesia =

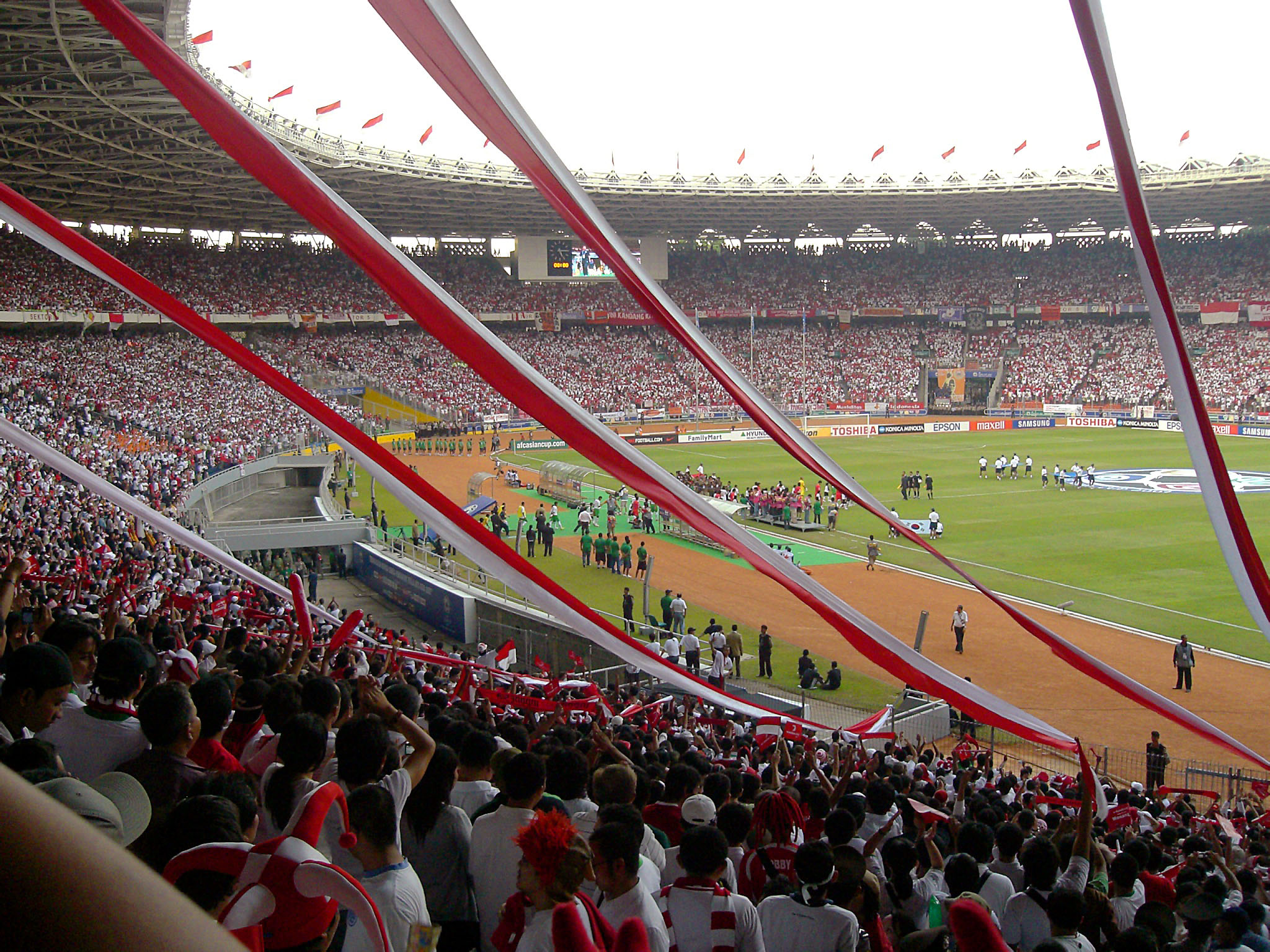
- The Indonesian national team plays at Gelora Bung Karno Stadium, Jakarta
- Country: Indonesia
- Governing body: PSSI
- National team: Garuda
- First played: Early 20th century

National competitions
- List: League: Super League Championship Liga Nusantara Liga 4 Indonesia Women's League (Women's) Elite Pro Academy; Cups: Piala Indonesia Pertiwi Cup (Women's) Soeratin Cup Piala Presiden I-League Cup

Association football is the most popular sport in Indonesia, in terms of annual attendance, participation and revenue. Approximately 60% of the people in Indonesia are interested in football.

Football is played on all levels, from children to middle-aged men. Super League, the Indonesian domestic league is popular. The national body is the Football Association of Indonesia (PSSI). The Indonesian football league started around 1930 in the Dutch colonial era.

== Indonesia football association ==
The government authority overseeing football activities in Indonesia is the Football Association of Indonesia (PSSI). PSSI is responsible for the coordination and administration of men's, women's, and futsal national teams, in addition to overseeing the management of the Indonesian League.

== Indonesian league system ==
In 1993, PSSI combined the existing "Galatama" which was a semi-professional competition and an amateur competition "Perserikatan" (lit. 'Union') to be a single professional competition for football clubs, known as the Indonesian League (Liga Indonesia). From 1994 to 2007, the format of the top division competition was a combination of double round-robin format and a single eliminations second round for several top teams of the table to decide the champions. Starting from 2008–09 season onwards, the competition format changed into a more common system that is also being used in most European football leagues. The single elimination round was removed and the competition became a full double round-robin league system. The name also changed into Indonesia Super League, and then later Liga 1, but reverted to Super League in 2025.

== Men's team ==
On the international stage, Indonesia experienced limited success despite being the first Asian team to qualify for the FIFA World Cup. In 1938, they played as the Dutch East Indies. Losing 0–6 to Hungary in a then-direct knockout stage, Indonesia became the only country to play only one match in the World Cup and has never qualified again since.

In 1956, the football team played in the Summer Olympics and earned a hard-fought 0–0 draw against then footballing superpower Soviet Union, led by the legendary Lev Yashin playing in goal for the Soviets, before losing 0–4 on the replay match. On the continental level, Indonesia won the bronze medal in the 1958 Asian Games. Indonesia's first appearance in Asian Cup dates back to 1996. With a draw against Kuwait in their first match and two defeats in the following two matches against Korea Republic and the host, UAE, Indonesia finished bottom of group A with a solitary point. In 2000, they again forced a draw against Kuwait, but then lost to China and the Korea Republic.

In 2004, the national team recorded their first-ever win in the Asian Cup against Qatar, but the dreams of the nation of going to the second round were shattered due to the defeats against China and Bahrain in the following group games. Indonesia beat Bahrain in 2007 AFC Asian Cup as one of the four co-hosts but the qualification dream was again shattered after two defeats by Asian superpowers Saudi Arabia and for the third time against the Korea Republic. However, Indonesia failed to qualify to the 2011 Asian Cup in Qatar after finishing bottom of Group B in the qualifiers without winning any single match, also failed to qualify to the 2015 Asian Cup in Australia after finishing bottom of Group C in the qualifiers winning any single match, and could not play any single qualifying match in 2019 after their football association was suspended due to governmental interference. However, under the management of Coach Shin Tae-Yong, Indonesia managed to advance to the round of 16 of the 2023 AFC Asian Cup in Qatar after being among the four best third-placed teams in the group stage, marking a historic achievement in the legacy of Indonesian football. Indonesia then managed to qualify to the 2027 AFC Asian Cup in Saudi Arabia after spending the first two rounds of the qualifiers.

The youth teams occasionally qualified for the AFC U-20 Asian Cup (U-20 team) and AFC U-17 Asian Cup (U-17 team). The U-19 team is the only Indonesian team to ever win continental-level tournament, share-winning the U-19 Championship in 1961 with Burma. The team is also the only one to qualify for a FIFA tournament under the name "Indonesia", playing in the U-20 World Cup (1979) and U-17 World Cup (2023 and 2025).

== Clubs ==
Indonesia has 7 traditional football teams where all of them are the founders of PSSI, the Indonesian football association. The seven teams are, Persib Bandung, Persija Jakarta, Persis Solo, Persebaya Surabaya, PPSM Magelang, PSIM Yogyakarta, and PSM Madiun. These seven teams are regulated directly in the rules of the Indonesian football federation where these seven teams are not allowed to change their name or change their logo significantly.

PSM Makassar is the oldest professional football team in Indonesia, it was founded on 2 November 1905 under the name Makassaarsche Voetbal Bond. Meanwhile, the oldest amateur and also oldest football club in Indonesia is UNI Bandung, which was founded in 1903 and is now an internal club under the auspices of Persib Bandung.

== Women's football ==
The country has never qualified for any FIFA women's tournament. However, the team has twice finished as high as fourth in the AFC Women's Asian Cup, in 1977 and 1986.

In December 2017, Women's Football Association of Indonesia (ASBWI) was created in their first congress in Palembang.

In 2019 Liga 1 Putri was launched as the top-flight women's football league in Indonesia.

== Criticisms ==
Despite having a reputation as one of the most passionate fans, Indonesia also has a reputation for violent hooliganism. Aside from the 135 that died in the Kanjuruhan Stadium disaster, there have been at least 95 football-related deaths between 2005 and 2018. On the world stage, Indonesia also has an intense rivalry with Malaysia. Fans of the two teams regularly have fights, with the recent case happening during the 2022 FIFA World Cup qualification (AFC), in which Indonesian fans harassed and provoked the Malaysian fans during their defeat at their home ground, Gelora Bung Karno Stadium. After the 2019 Southeast Asian Games, Indonesian fans also took to social media to insult, harass, and send death threats to Vietnamese players, and even their families, in response to the loss in the final to Vietnam. Indonesia have been warned and banned several times by FIFA due to their act of hooliganism and sometimes having their government intervening on PSSI.

The third biggest football disaster in the world also occurred in Indonesia. Violence reoccurred at Kanjuruhan Stadium in Malang, where 135 people died and hundreds were injured. The incident began when Aremania, Arema supporters who did not accept that their team suffered defeat against their rival, Persebaya. Where riots spread in the stands to exit the stadium. The police threw tear gas and caused the death in the stadium.

== Support ==
=== Polling ===
Most popular foreign football clubs in Indonesia (GoodStats, 2022)
Club	%
(Italy) AC Milan	2.8%
(England) Arsenal	2.9%
(Spain) Barcelona	9.8%
(England) Chelsea	2.2%
(England) Liverpool	3.3%
(England) Manchester United	9.8%
(Spain) Real Madrid	7.2%

Most popular football clubs in Indonesia (Statista, 2016)
Club	%
(Spain) Barcelona	32%
(England) Chelsea	14%
(England) Manchester United	27%
(Indonesia) Persib Bandung	15%
(Spain) Real Madrid	26%

== Attendances ==
The average attendance per top-flight football league season and the club with the highest average attendance:

Season	League average	Best club	Best club average
2024–25	4,963	Persija	15,414
2023–24	5,235	Persija	17,360
2022–23	5,137	Persija	17,824
2019	9,359	Persija	24,303
2018	10,136	Persebaya	28,543
2017	8,703	Persija	23,054

Sources: League pages on Wikipedia

== See also ==
- Indonesia national football team
- Indonesia women's national football team
- Indonesia national futsal team
- Indonesia Pro Futsal League
- List of stadiums in Indonesia
