= Tanah Laut Regency =

Regency in South Kalimantan, Indonesia

Coordinates: 3.8833°S 114.8667°E

Tanah Laut Regency Kabupaten Tanah Laut
- Regency

Other transcription(s)
  - Jawi: تانه لاوت
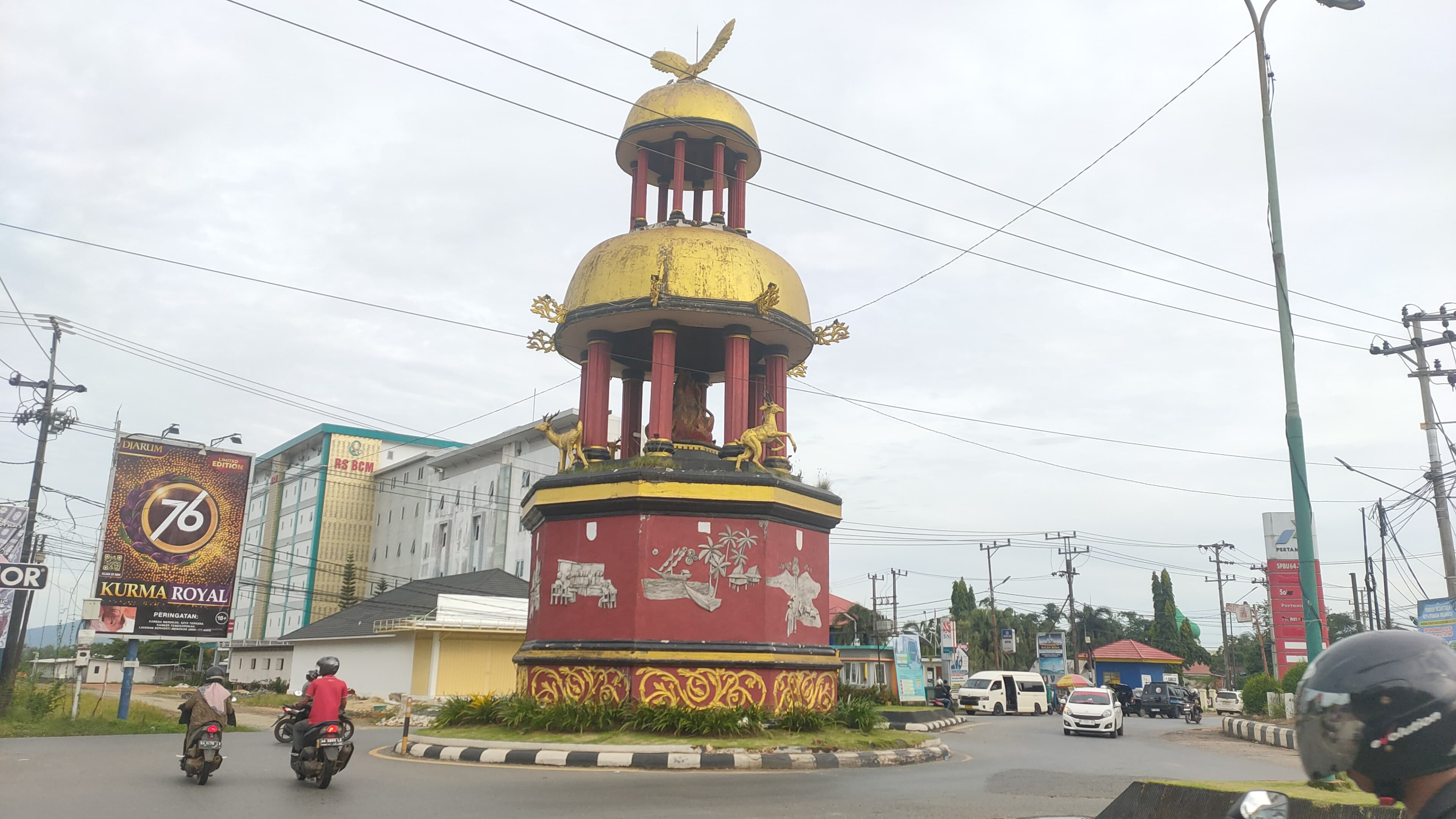
- Kijang Monument or Angsau Roundabout, Pelaihari

- Coat of arms
- Motto: Tuntung Pandang (Nice to See Until Forever)
- Country: Indonesia
- Province: South Kalimantan
- Capital: Pelaihari

Government
  - Regent: Rahmat Trianto
  - Vice Regent: Muhammad Zazuli

Area
  - Total: 3,841.157 km^{2} (1,483.079 sq mi)

Population (mid 2025 estimate)
  - Total: 375,583
  - Density: 97.7786/km^{2} (253.245/sq mi)
- Time zone: UTC+8 (WITA)
- Area code: +62 512
- Website: tanahlautkab.go.id

Tanah Laut Regency is one of the regencies in the Indonesian province of South Kalimantan. It encompasses the southernmost part of Kalimantan (Borneo). The land area is 3,841.157 km^{2}, and the population was 296,333 at the 2010 Census and 348,966 at the 2020 Census; the official estimate as at mid 2025 was 375,583 (comprising 190,759 males and 184,824 females). The capital is the town of Pelaihari. Motto: "Tuntung Pandang" (Banjarese); Tuntung Pandang has the meaning of "nice to see until forever"

== Administrative districts ==
The Regency is divided into eleven districts (kecamatan), listed below with their areas and their populations at the 2010 Census and 2020 Census, together with the official estimates as at mid 2025. Of the eleven districts, ten of them (all except the large Kintap District in the east of the regency) lie within the official Banjarmasin metropolitan area. The table also includes the locations of the district administrative centres, the number of administrative villages in each district (a total of 130 rural desa and 5 urban kelurahan - the latter all in Pelaihari District), and its post code.

Kode Wilayah	Name of District (kecamatan)	Area in km^{2}	Pop'n Census 2010	Pop'n Census 2010	Pop'n Estimate mid 2025	Admin centre	No. of villages	Post code
63.01.06	Panyipatan	388.91	21,151	25,135	26,824	Panyipatan	10	70871
63.01.01	Takisung	223.67	27,998	32,378	34,742	Gunung Makmur	12	70861
63.01.04	Kurau	68.70	11,578	13,580	14,917	Padang Luas	11	70851
63.01.11	Bumi Makmur	104.66	11,831	13,765	14,735	Handil Babirik	11	70853
63.01.05	Bati Bati	234.25	38,645	44,737	47,595	Padang	14	70852
63.01.08	Tambang Ulang	198.35	14,925	17,797	19,611	Tambang Ulang	9	70854
63.01.03	Pelaihari	364.03	63,895	77,246	84,227	Pelaihari	20 ^{(a)}	70812: 70815
63.01.10	Bajuin	284.71	15,957	19,150	20,676	Bajuin	9	70815
63.01.09	Batu Ampar	419.05	11,831	27,557	29,387	Batu Ampar	14	70882
63.01.02	Jorong	697.84	29,002	34,553	37,122	Jorong	11	70881
63.01.07	Kintap	857.21	38,118	43,068	45,747	Kintapura	14	70883
	Totals	3,841.157	296,333	348,966	375,583	Pelaihari	135	

Note: (a) includes the five kelurahan of Angsau (with 13,185 inhabitants in mid 2024), Karang Taruna (11,485), Pabahanan (2,984), Pelaihari (11,471) and Sarang Halang (7,595).

== Climate ==
Pelaihari, the seat of the regency has a tropical rainforest climate (Af) with moderate rainfall from July to October and heavy to very heavy rainfall from November to June.

Climate data for Pelaihari
Month	Jan	Feb	Mar	Apr	May	Jun	Jul	Aug	Sep	Oct	Nov	Dec	Year
Mean daily maximum °C (°F)	30.0 (86.0)	30.4 (86.7)	30.8 (87.4)	31.5 (88.7)	31.7 (89.1)	31.3 (88.3)	31.2 (88.2)	31.8 (89.2)	32.3 (90.1)	32.6 (90.7)	31.6 (88.9)	30.5 (86.9)	31.3 (88.4)
Daily mean °C (°F)	26.5 (79.7)	26.7 (80.1)	27.0 (80.6)	27.4 (81.3)	27.6 (81.7)	26.9 (80.4)	26.5 (79.7)	26.8 (80.2)	27.2 (81.0)	27.7 (81.9)	27.3 (81.1)	26.8 (80.2)	27.0 (80.7)
Mean daily minimum °C (°F)	23.0 (73.4)	23.1 (73.6)	23.2 (73.8)	23.4 (74.1)	23.5 (74.3)	22.5 (72.5)	21.8 (71.2)	21.8 (71.2)	22.1 (71.8)	22.8 (73.0)	23.1 (73.6)	23.1 (73.6)	22.8 (73.0)
Average rainfall mm (inches)	344 (13.5)	287 (11.3)	282 (11.1)	215 (8.5)	151 (5.9)	150 (5.9)	97 (3.8)	61 (2.4)	98 (3.9)	107 (4.2)	252 (9.9)	421 (16.6)	2,465 (97)
Source: Climate-Data.org
