= Banjar Regency =

Regency in South Kalimantan, Indonesia

Coordinates: 3.3167°S 115.0833°E

Banjar Regency Kabupaten Banjar
- Regency

Other transcription(s)
  - Jawi: بنجر
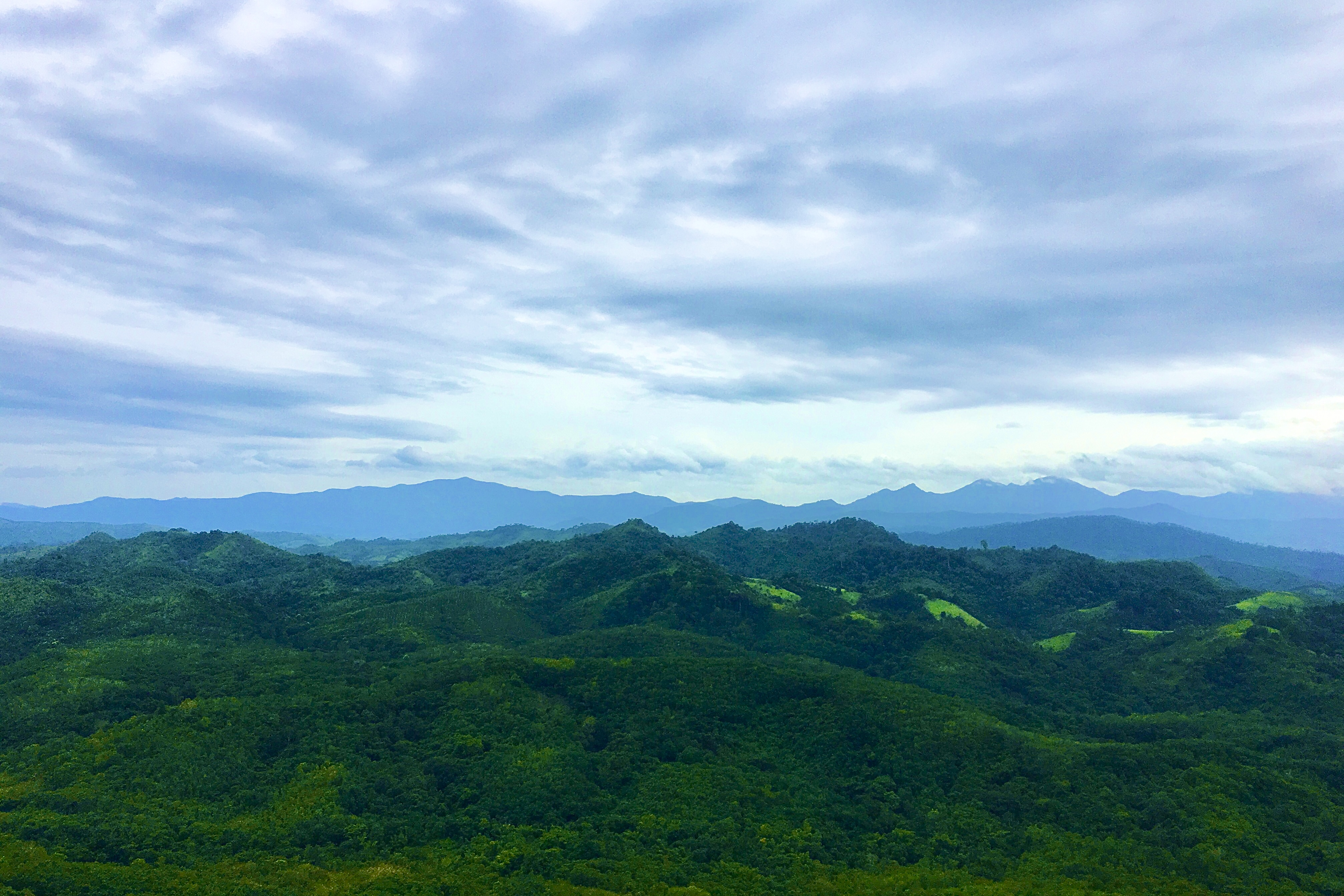
- Sultan Adam Forrest Park

- Coat of arms
- Motto: Barakat (Blessings)
- Country: Indonesia
- Province: South Kalimantan
- Capital: Martapura

Government
  - Regent: Saidi Mansyur
  - Vice Regent: Said Idrus

Area
  - Total: 4,668.50 km^{2} (1,802.52 sq mi)

Population (mid 2025 estimate)
  - Total: 595,717
  - Density: 127.604/km^{2} (330.492/sq mi)
- Time zone: UTC+8 (WITA)
- Area code: +62 511
- Website: banjarkab.go.id

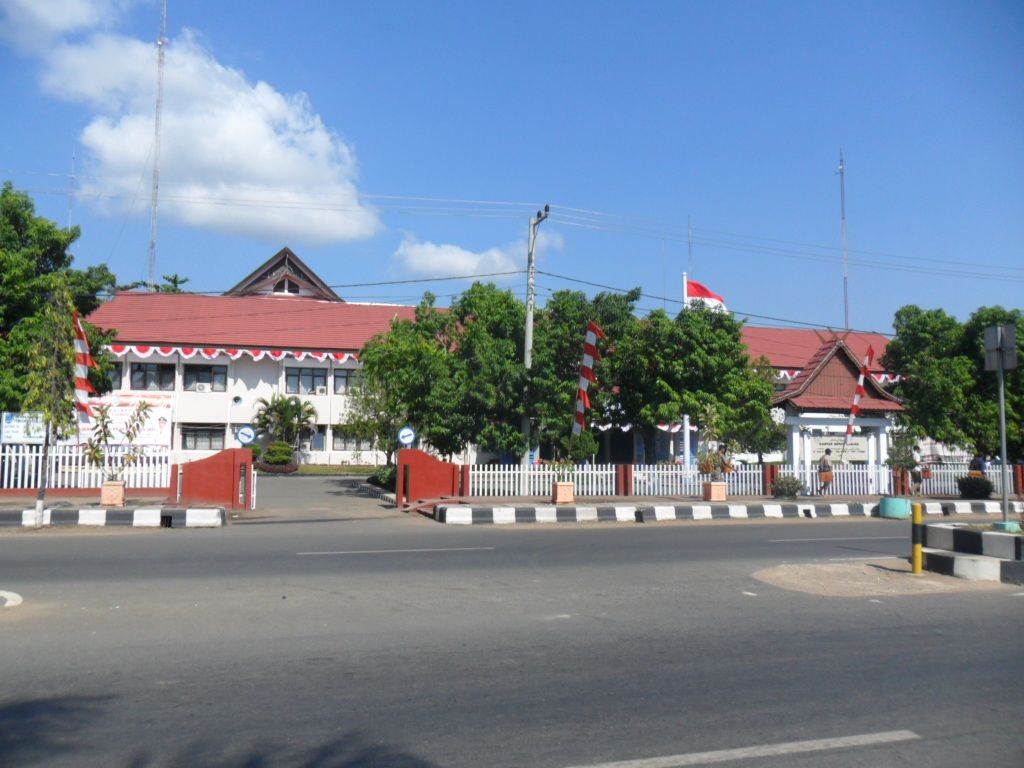
Banjar Regency government office

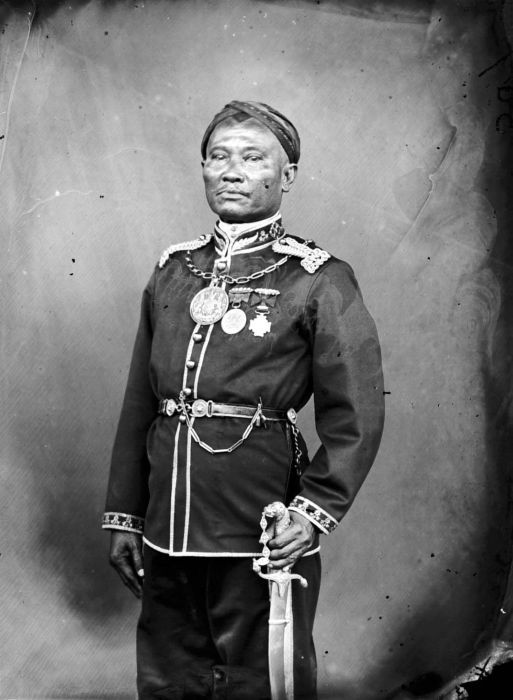
Soeria Winata, regent of Martapura during colonial period in 1870.

Banjar Regency is one of the eleven regencies in the Indonesian province of South Kalimantan; the capital is Martapura. It covers an area of 4,668.5 km^{2}, and had a population of 506,839 at the 2010 Census, and 565,635 at the 2020 Census; the official estimate as at mid 2025 was 595,717 (comprising 300,735 males and 294,982 females). It lies immediately to the east of the city of Banjarmasin and north of the city of Banjarbaru, which it surrounds on the latter's west, north and east sides; the regency capital of Martapura is immediately north of Banjarbaru, of which it is effectively an extension. This regency is noted for its diamond mines and its people's religiosity (of Islam). Motto: "Barakat" (Banjarese:"Blessing").

== Administration ==
Until 20 April 1999, Banjar Regency included the large town of Banjarbaru, but on that date Banjarbaru was separated from the regency and created as an independent city. At the time of the 2010 Census, the residual Banjar Regency was divided into nineteen districts (kecamatan). Subsequently a twentieth district (Cintapuri Darussalam) was created by division from Simpang Empat District.

The districts are listed below with their areas and their populations at the 2010 Census and the 2020 Census, together with the official estimates as at mid 2025. The table also includes the number of administrative villages in each district (a total of 277 rural desa and 13 urban kelurahan), and its post code. For ease of reference these are grouped geographically into three sections - a western group adjacent to Banjarmasin City, a central or Martapura group immediately north of Banjarbaru City, and a much larger but more sparely-populated group to the east and north of Banjarbaru; this grouping has no administrative significance. Fourteen of the districts (including the entire Western and Martapura groups, and the western part of the third group) lie within the official Banjarbaru metropolitan area.

Kode Wilayah	Name of District (kecamatan)	Area in km^{2}	Pop'n Census 2010	Pop'n Census 2020	Pop'n Estimate mid 2025	Admin centre	No. of villages	Post code
63.03.01	Aluh-Aluh	82.48	27,285	28,363	30,571	Aluh-Aluh Besar	19	70655
63.03.13	Beruntung Baru	61.42	13,181	14,254	14,907	Kampung Baru	12	70656
63.03.03	Gambut	129.30	35,956	44,751	47,578	Gambut	14 ^{(a)}	70652
63.03.02	Kertak Hanyar	45.83	38,909	45,489	43,352	Manarap Lama	13 ^{(b)}	70654
63.03.19	Tatah Makmur	35.47	10,974	12,545	13,633	Tampang Awang	13	70650
63.03.04	Sungai Tabuk (Tabuk River)	147.30	56,869	64,890	64,036	Abumbun Jaya	21 ^{(c)}	70653
	Western group	501.80	183,174	210,292	214,077		92	
63.03.05	Martapura (town)	42.03	101,482	121,153	130,177	Bincau	26 ^{(d)}	70611: 70619 ^{(e)}
63.03.15	Martapura Timur (East Martapura)	29.99	29,200	29,370	31,113	Mekar	20	70617
63.03.14	Martapura Barat (West Martapura)	149.38	16,972	18,833	19,774	Sungai Rangas	13	70618
	Martapura group	221.40	147,654	169,356	181,064		59	
63.03.07	Astambul	216.50	33,009	34,531	36,996	Astambul	22	70670
63.03.06	Karang Intan	215.35	30,679	34,912	37,696	Karang Intan	26	70661
63.03.11	Aranio ^{(f)}	1,166.35	8,246	8,982	9,808	Aranio	12	70671
63.03.10	Sungai Pinang ^{(f)} (Pinang River)	458.65	14,511	13,938	15,513	Sungai Pinang	11	70678
63.03.17	Paramasan ^{(f)}	560.85	4,214	3,755	3,936	Paramasan Bawah	4	70675
63.03.09	Pengaron ^{(f)}	433.25	15,764	16,557	18,313	Pengaron	12	70668
63.03.16	Sambung Makmur ^{(f)}	134.65	10,562	11,841	13,540	Paramasan Bawah	7	70677
63.03.12	Mataraman	148.40	23,662	24,586	25,346	Mataraman	15	70672
63.03.08	Simpang Empat	141.10	33,033	22,927	24,671	Simpang Empat	15	70653 -70673
63.03.18	Telaga Bauntung ^{(f)}	158.00	3,112	3,322	3,497	Lok Tanah	4	70673
63.03.20	Cintapuri Darussalam	312.20	^{(g)}	10,636	11,260	Cintapuri	11	70676
	Eastern and northern group	3,945.30	176,011	185,987	200,576		139	
	Totals	4,668.50	506,839	565,635	595,717	Martapura	290	

Note: (a) includes 2 kelurahan - Gambut and Gambut Barat. (b) includes 3 kelurahan - Kertak Hanyar I, Manarap Lama and Mandar Sari.
(c) includes one kelurahan - the town of Sungai Tabuk. (d) includes 7 kelurahan - Jawa, Keraton, Murung Keraton, Pasayangan, Sekumpul, Sungai Paring and Tanjung Rema Darat.
(e) except for the kelurahan of Sungai Paring, which has a postcode of 71213.
(f) these six districts lie outside of the Banjarbaru metropolitan area; together this non-metropolitan "eastern" zone covers 2,911.75 km^{2} with a combined population of 64,607 as at mid 2025.
(g) the 2010 population figure for Cintapuri Darussalam District is included in that for Simpang Empat District, from which it was subsequently split off.

== Tourist attractions ==
- Al-Karomah Great Mosque
- Bincau Fish Pond
- Cahaya Bumi Selamat Park
- Lok Baintan Floating Market
- Sultan Adam Cemetery

== See also ==
- Banjar people
