= Banjarmasin metropolitan area =

Banjarmasin metropolitan area Banjarbakula
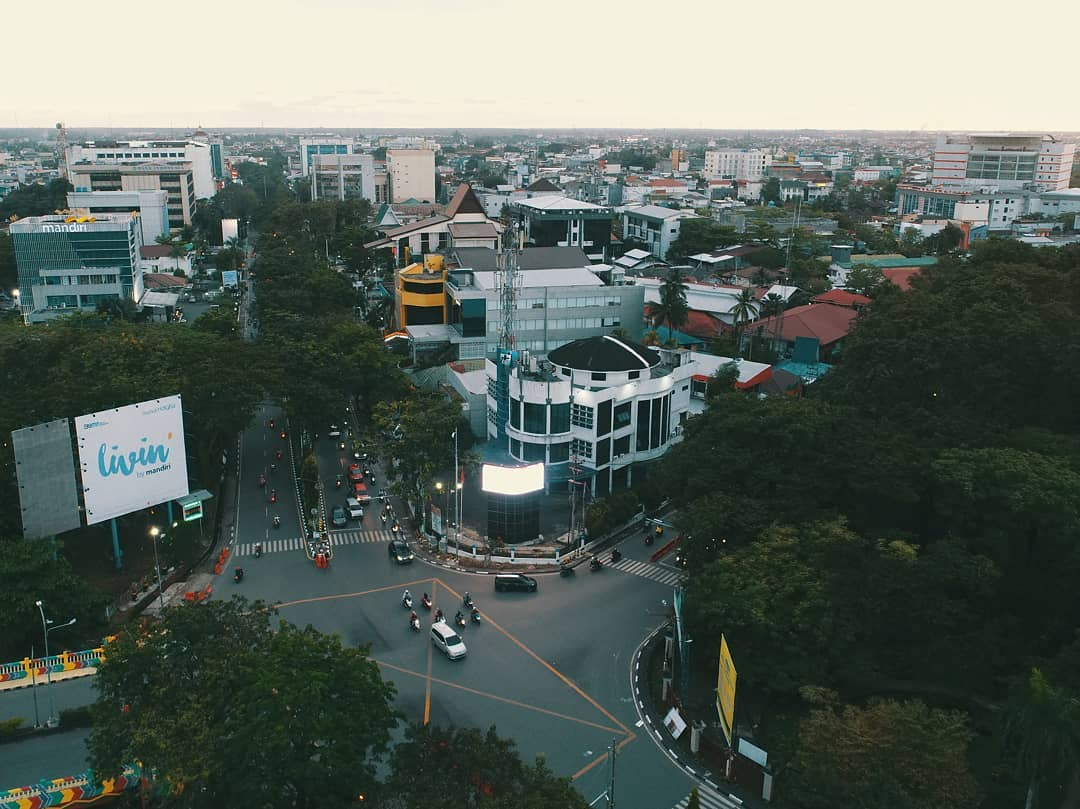
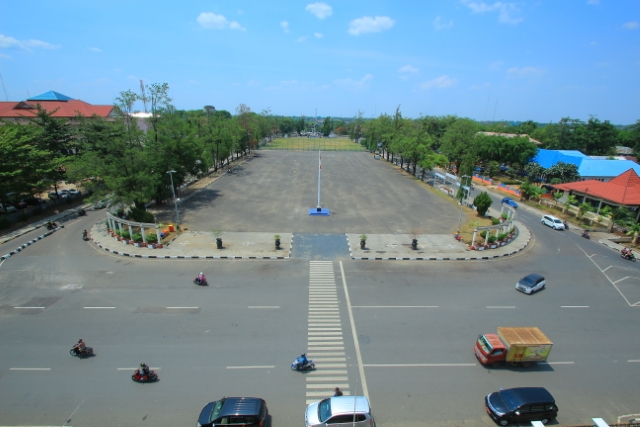
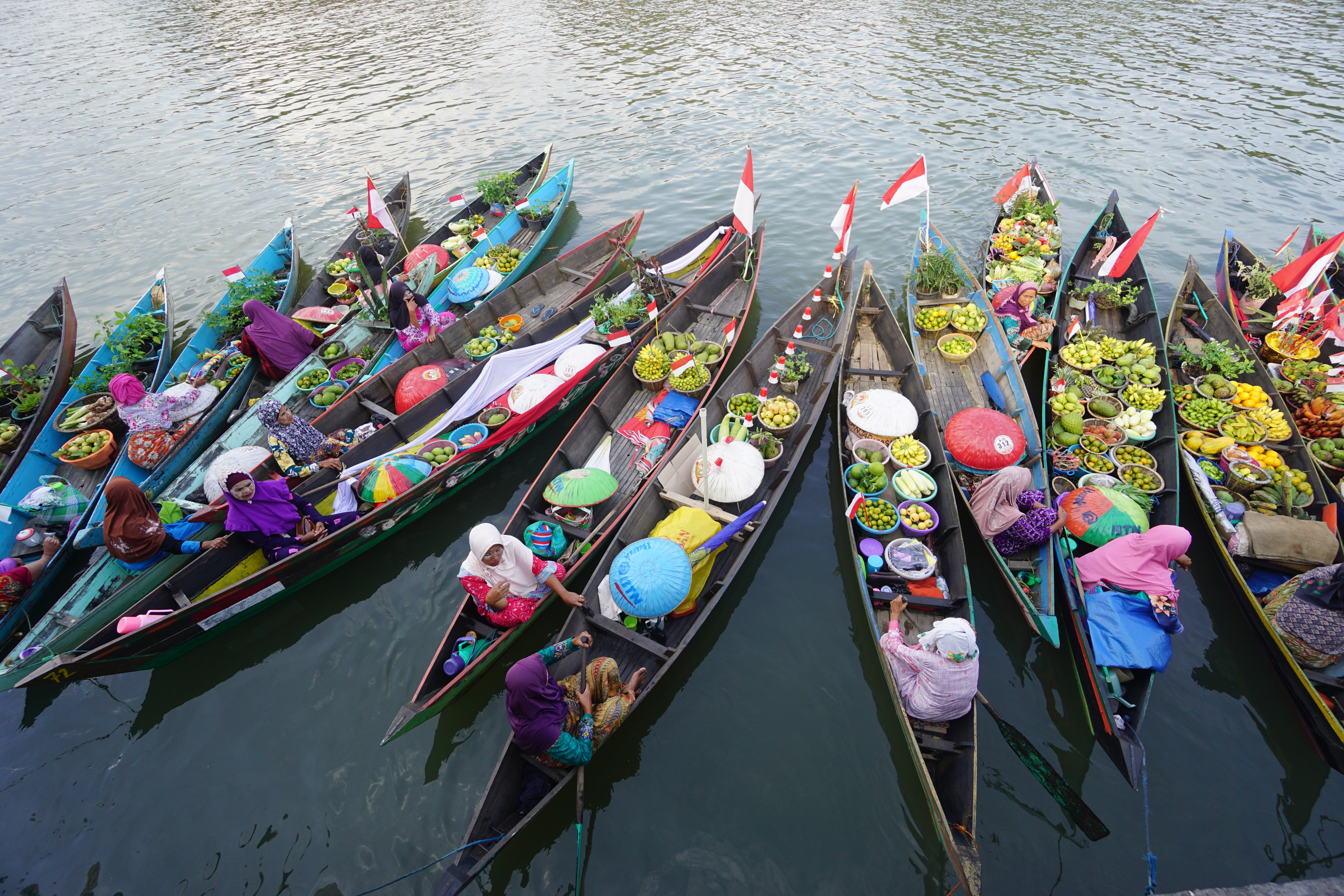
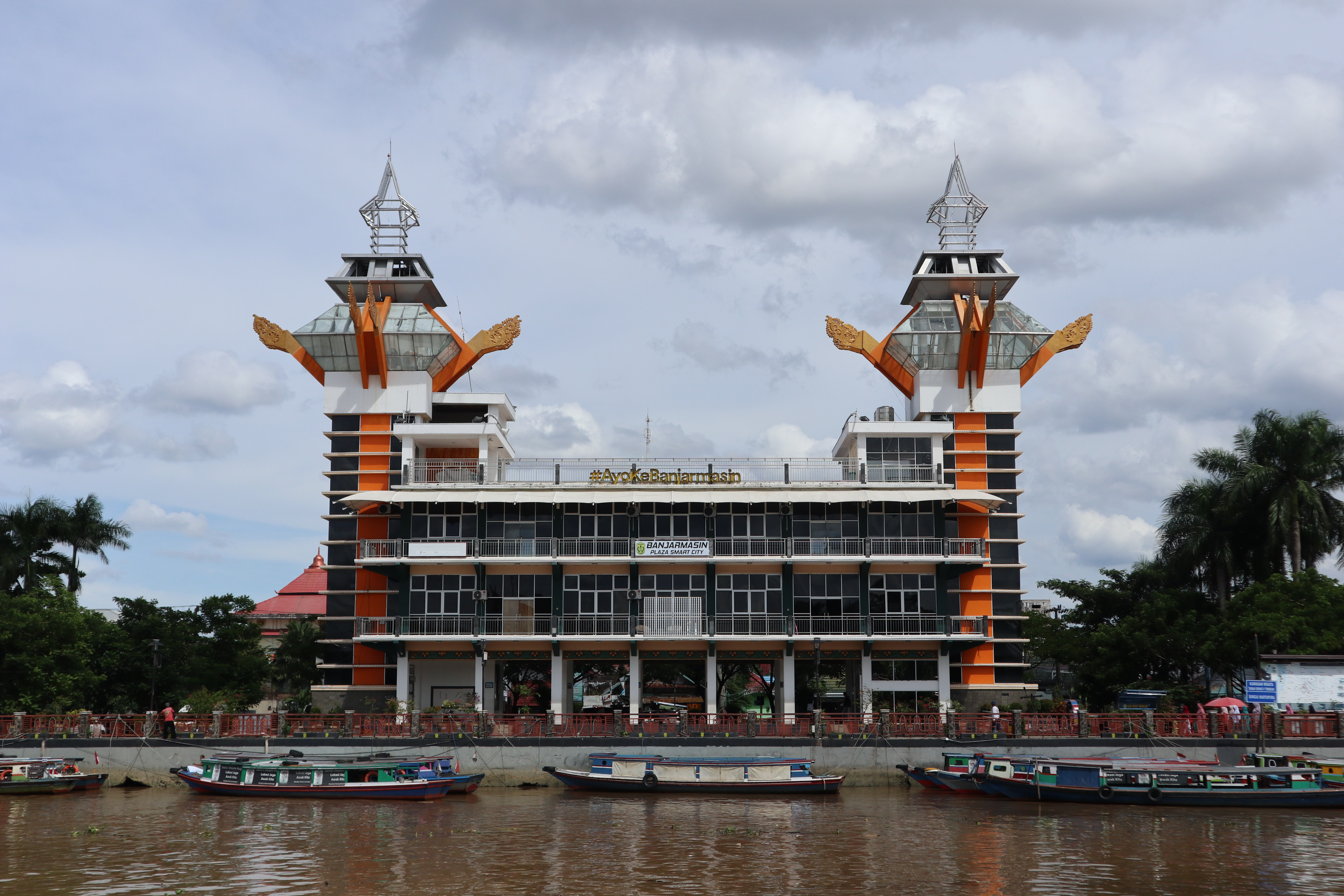
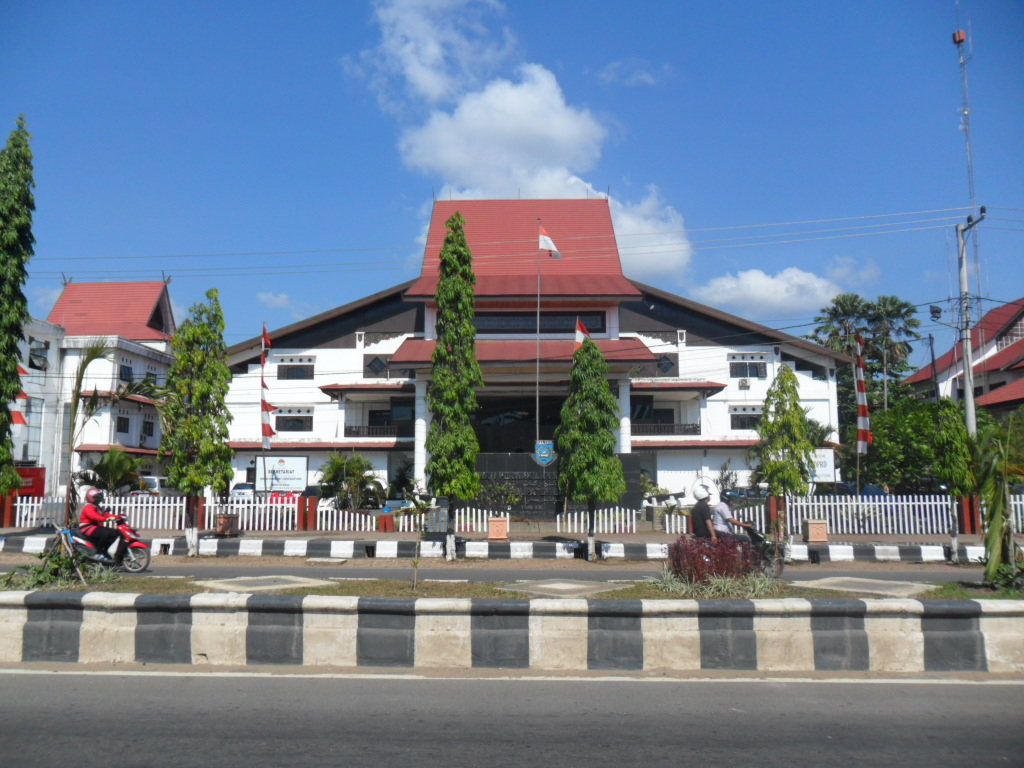
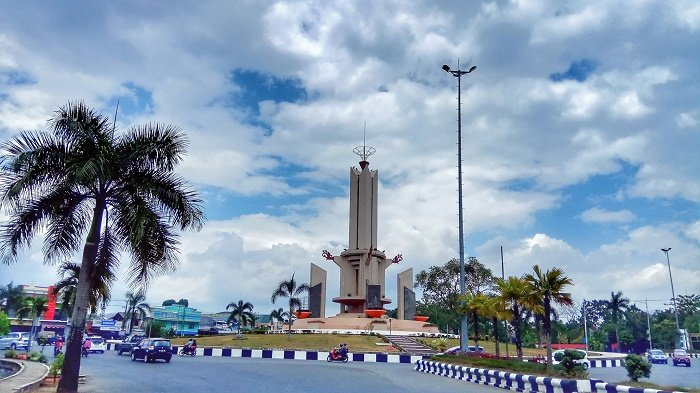
- From top, left to right: Banjarmasin view, Dr Murdjani square in Banjarbaru city, Floating market of Banjarmasin city, Pandang Tower in Banjarmasin, Government building in Banjar Regency, Welcome statue in Banjarbaru
- Interactive map of Banjarmasin metropolitan area
- Coordinates: 03°19′12″S 114°35′33″E
- Country: Indonesia
- Province: South Kalimantan
- Core city: Banjarmasin
- Satellite city: Banjarbaru
- Regencies: Banjar Regency; Barito Kuala Regency; Tanah Laut Regency

Area
  - Metro: 5,072.02 km^{2} (1,958.32 sq mi)

Population (mid 2024 estimate)
  - Metro: 1,551,923
  - Metro density: 305.977/km^{2} (792.478/sq mi)
- Time zone: UTC+8 (Indonesia Central Time)
- GDP metro: 2023
- Total: ▲Rp 78.012 trillion ▲US$ 5.118 billion ▲US$ 16.391 billion (PPP)
- Per capita: ▲Rp 51.120 million ▲US$ 3,354 ▲US$ 10,741 (PPP)

Banjarmasin metropolitan area, officially known as Banjarbakula (acronym of "Banjarmasin-Banjarbaru-Banjar"), or native name Wilayah metropolitan Banjarmasin, is a metropolitan area located in Indonesia. This area includes Banjarmasin city and its surrounding areas such as Banjarbaru city, and Banjar Regency. This region of South Kalimantan province, officially the biggest city in Southern Kalimantan island on Barito River to Java Sea. It has an area of 5,072.02 km^{2}, and at the mid-2024 official estimate had a population of 1,551,923

== Definition ==
The national government regards the Banjarmasin Metropolitan Area as including Banjarmasin city, Banjarbaru city, and Banjar Regency. Other government definitions of the Greater Banjarmasin Region (known as "Banjarbakula") place the population at more than 2 million inhabitants.

== Demographics ==
| Administrative Region | Area (km^{2}) | Pop'n 2010 Census | Pop'n 2020 Census | Pop'n 2024 estimate | Density (per km^{2}) 2024 |
|---|---|---|---|---|---|
| Banjarmasin | 98.37 | 625,481 | 657,663 | 681,693 | 6,930 |
| Banjarbaru | 305.15 | 199,627 | 253,442 | 285,546 | 938 |
| Banjar Regency | 4,668.50 | 506,839 | 565,635 | 584,684 | 125 |
| Banjarbakula | 5,072.02 | 1,132,320 | 1,476,740 | 1,551,923 | 306 |

== Geography ==
Banjarmasin is situated in the Barito River basin, and Banjarbaru and Banjar Regency are located at the foot of the Meratus Mountains in the southern part of Kalimantan Island.

== Economy ==
Around 62% of industry in Banjarmasin is focused on food and drink processing and related products, which account for about 15% of the city's industrial output. This includes bread, flour, and soybean sauce production. Other industries include rubber and plastic manufacturing. The service sector dominated the city's economy at around 23%. Other big sectors include restaurant & hotel and construction.

== Infrastructure ==
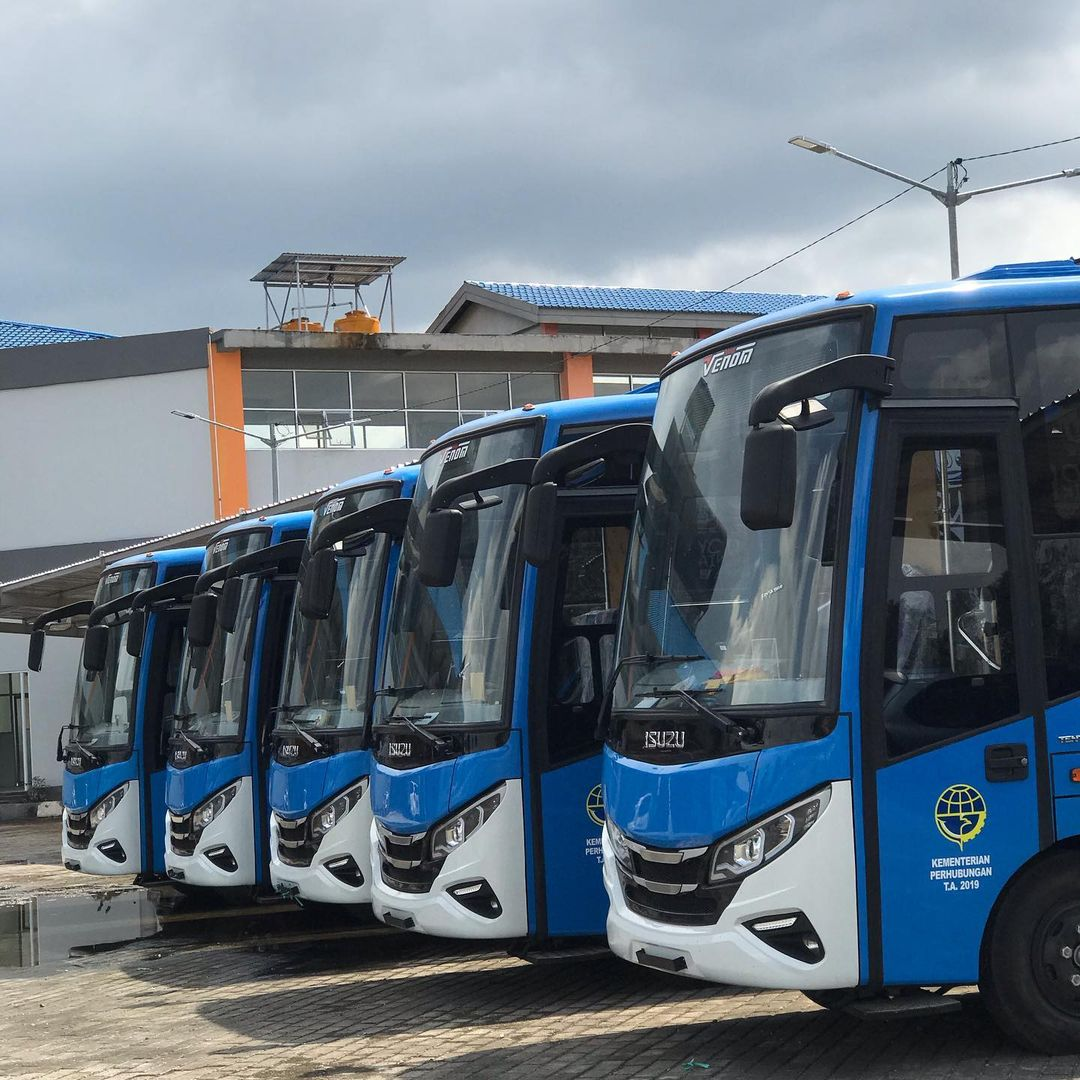
A fleet of BRT Banjarbakula bus, which serves Banjarbaru city

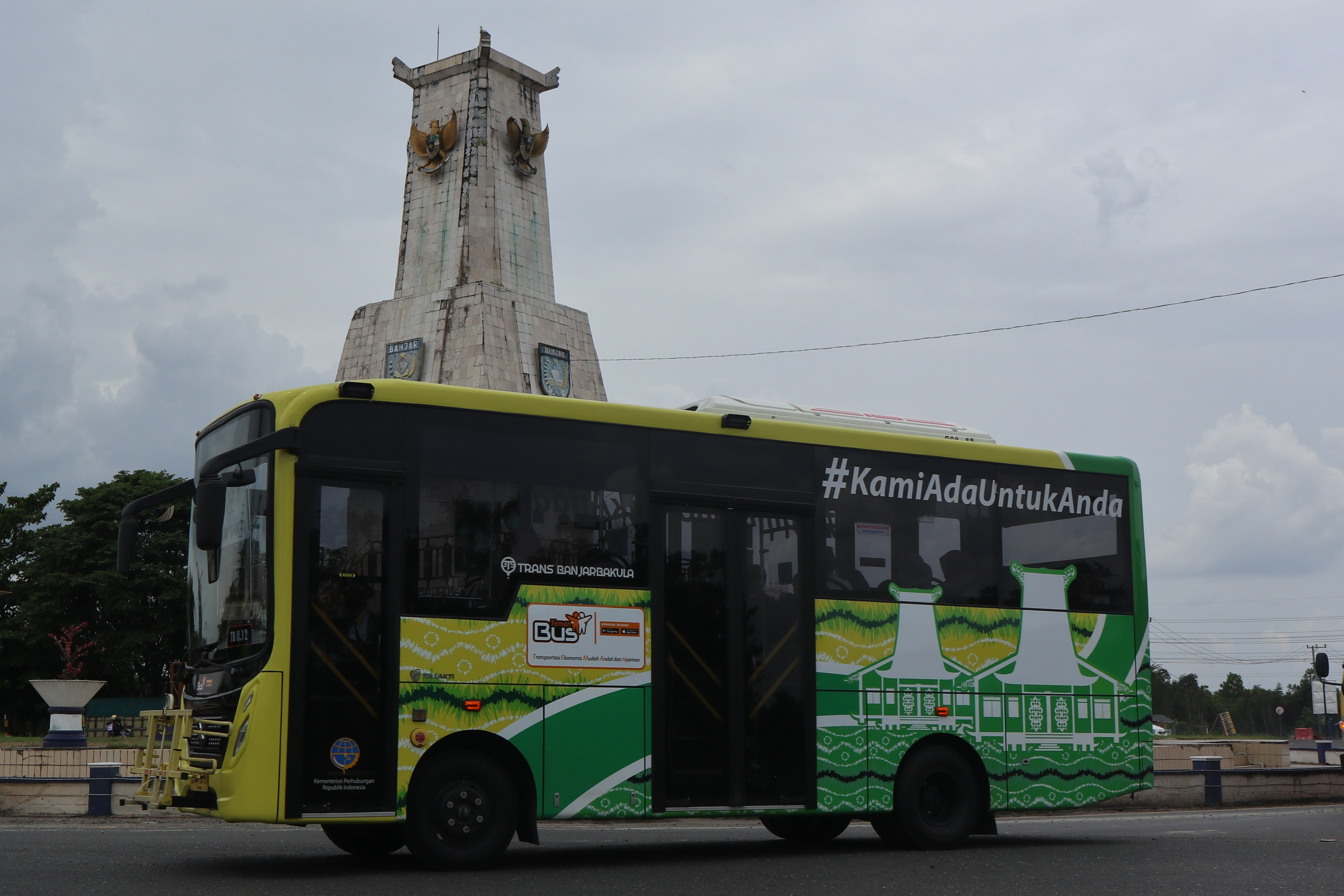
Trans Banjarbakula bus

BRT Banjarbakula and Trans Banjarbakula are the most reliable and the cheapest public transportation the metropolitan area, mainly in Banjarmasin and Banjarbaru. It began to operate in August 2019.The price for one ride is Rp3,500 for the public. Trans Banjarbakula operates from 06:00 to 20:00. LAKATAN bus also serve the metropolitan area, especially for Tanah Laut Regency since 2023.

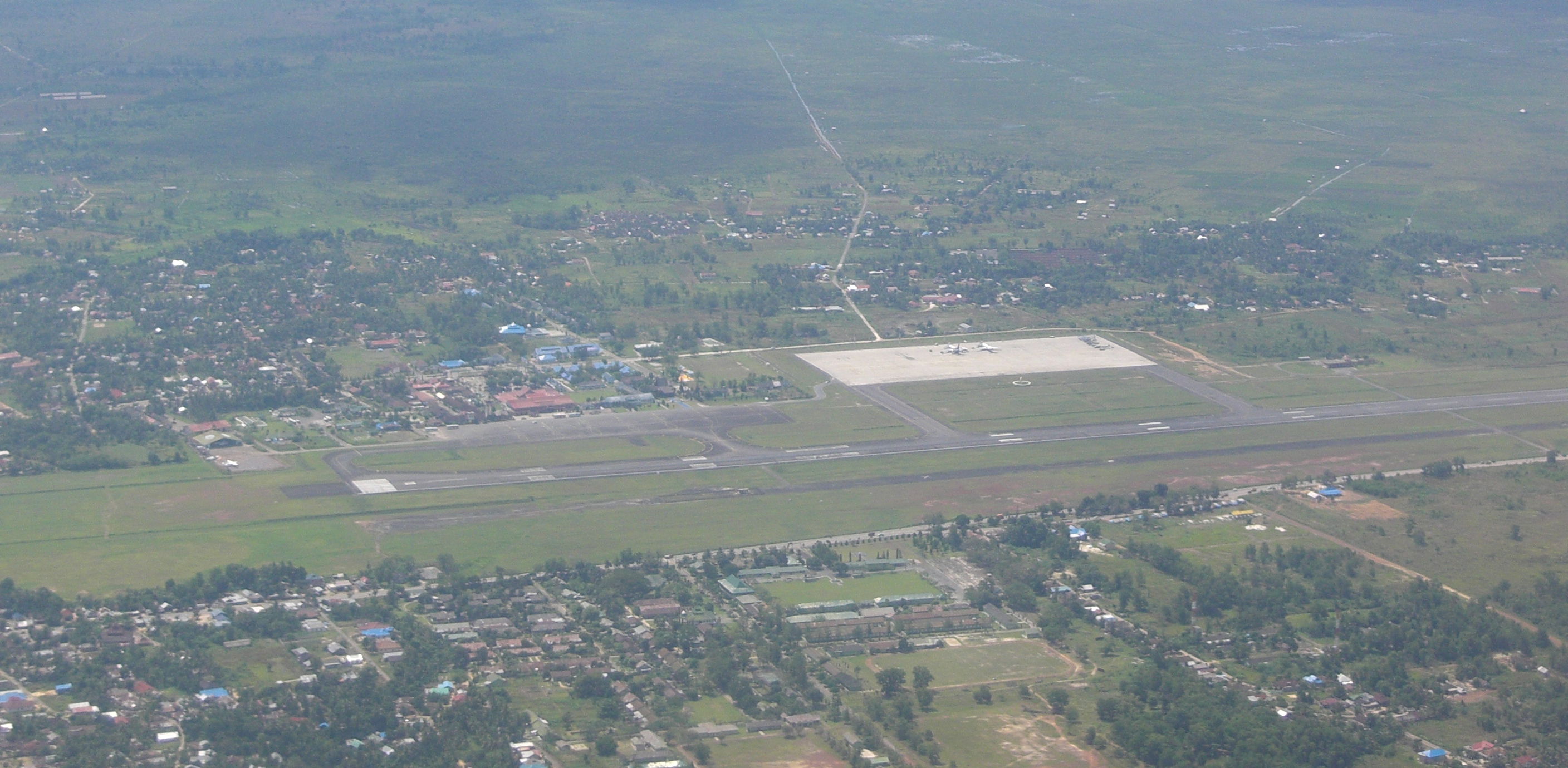
Overlooking the Syamsuddin Noor airport from the plane

Syamsudin Noor Airport serving Banjarmasin It is located in the district of Landasan Ulin, 5 kilometres west of Banjarbaru, capital of South Kalimantan, and about 25 km south-east from the centre of the city of Banjarmasin, the largest city of South Kalimantan. The airport served more than 5.3 million passengers in 2017.

The metropolitan area is also served by Port of Trisakti and Gambut Barakat terminal.

== See also ==
- List of metropolitan areas in Indonesia
- Batam metropolitan area
- Padang metropolitan area
- Makassar metropolitan area
- Denpasar metropolitan area
