= Banjarmasin =

Largest city in South Kalimantan, Indonesia

- City
- City of Banjarmasin; Kota Banjarmasin

Other transcription(s)
  - Jawi: بنجر ماسين
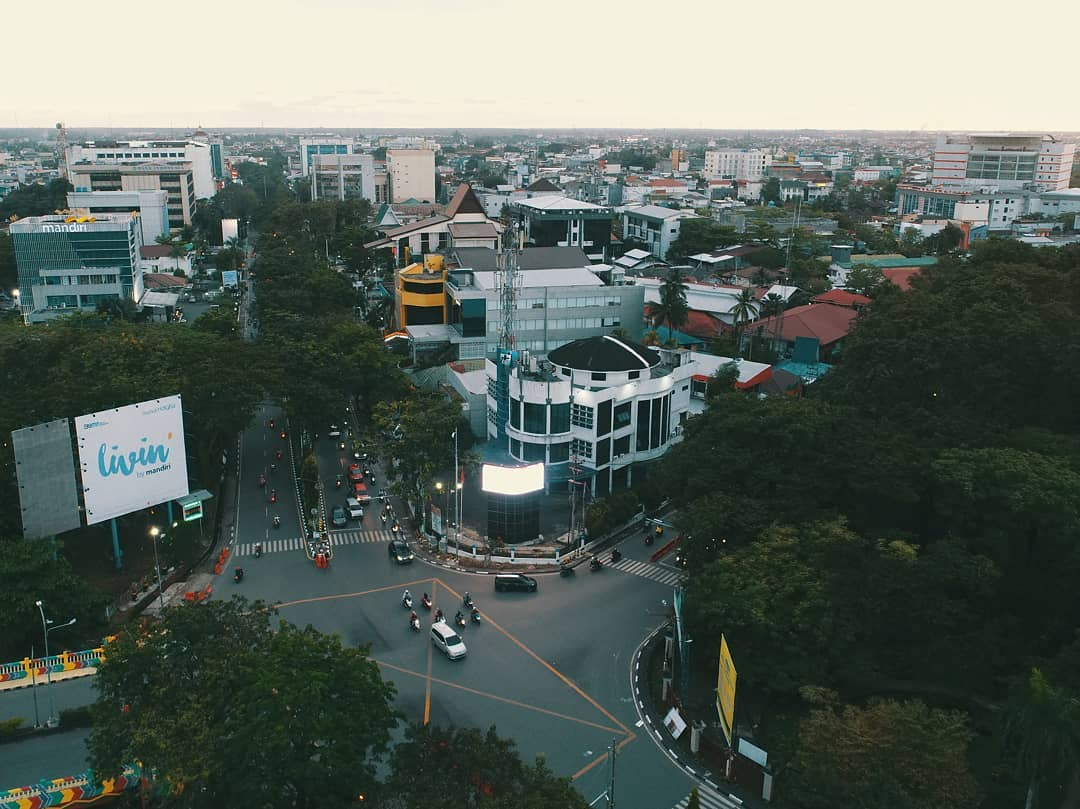
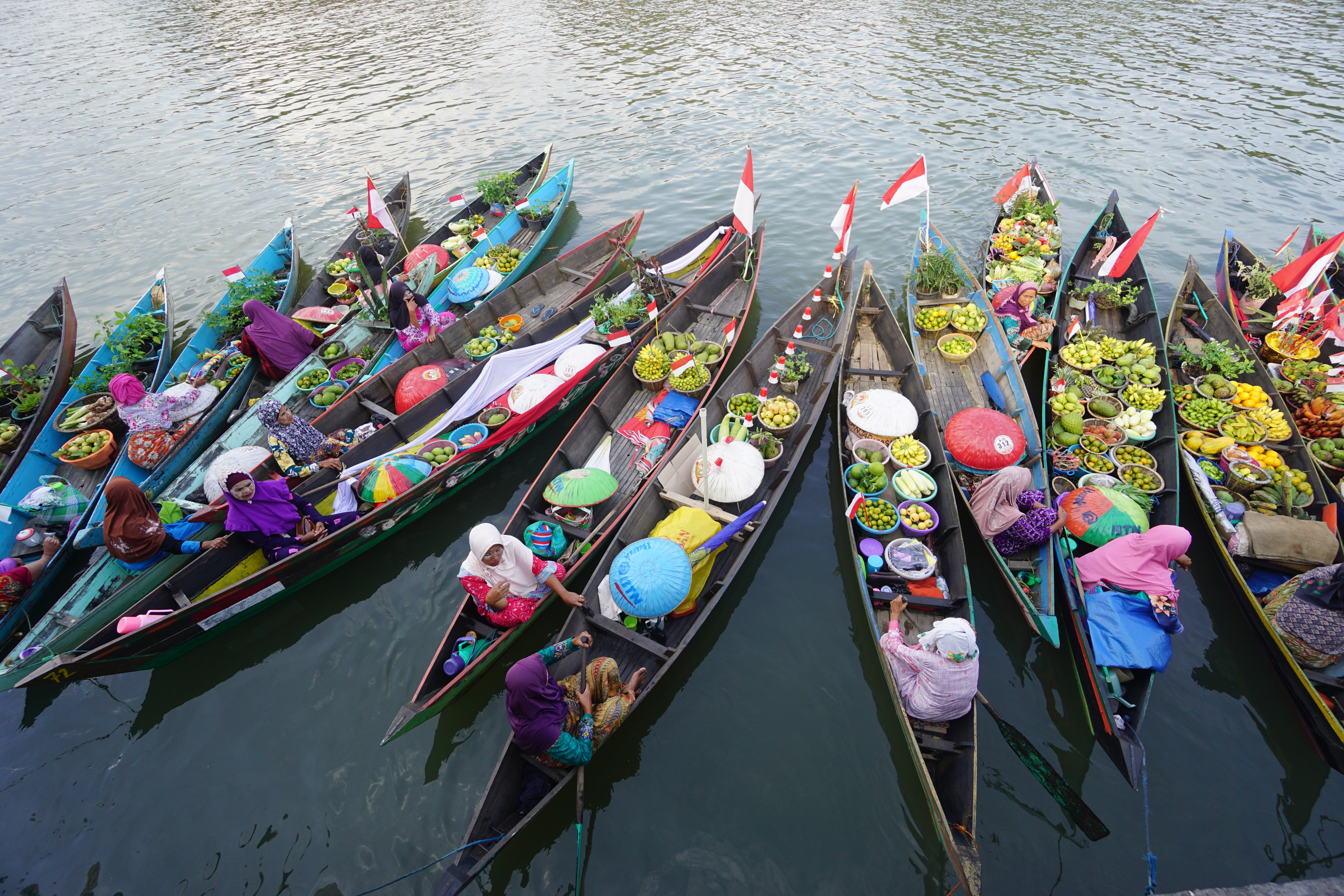
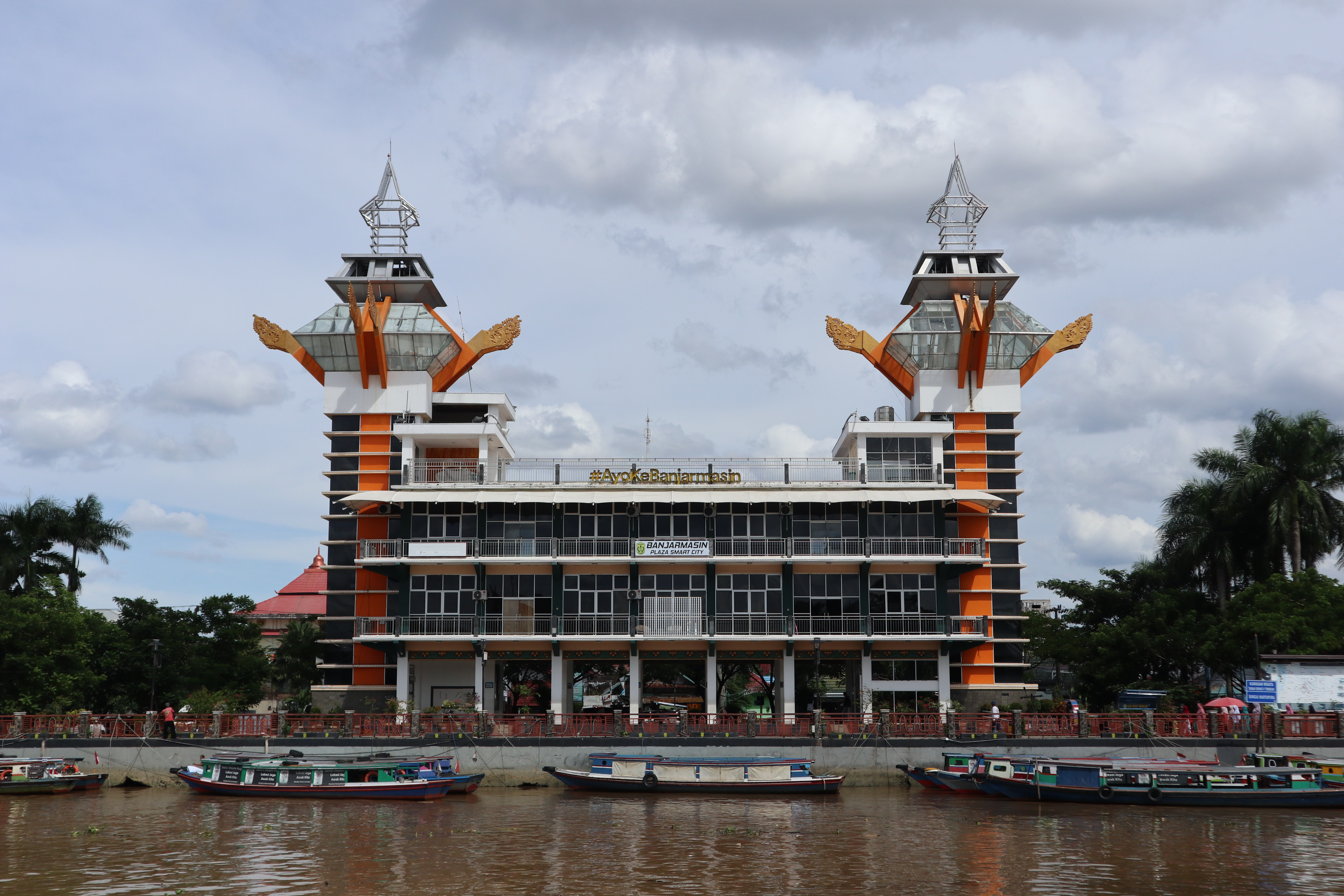
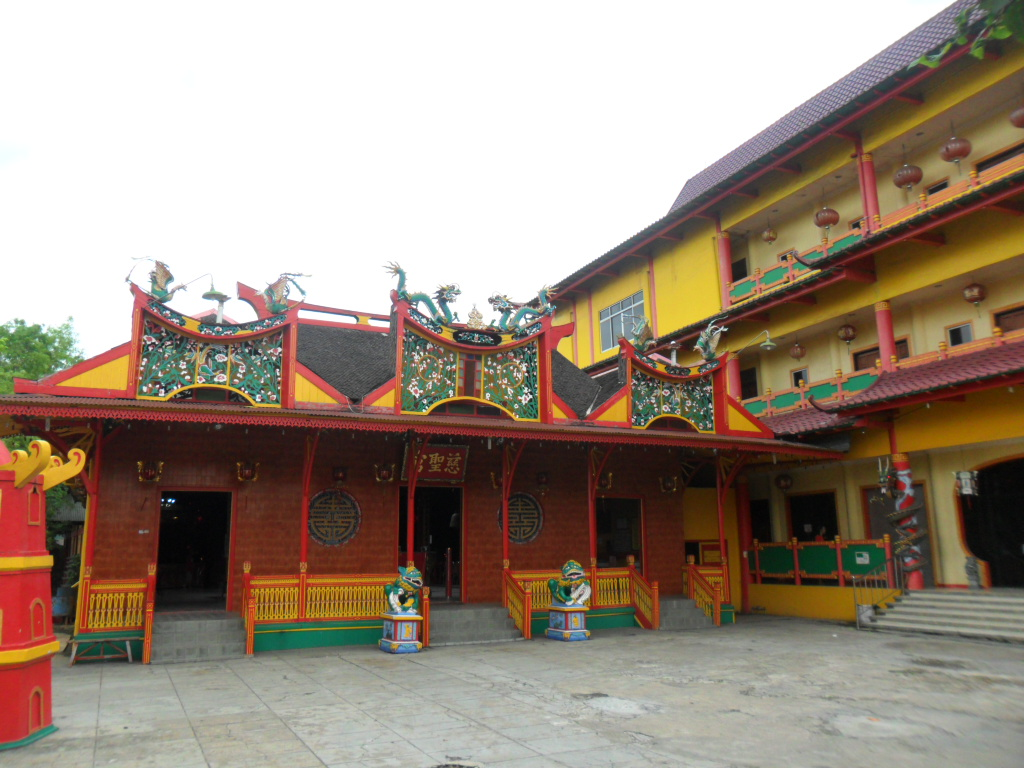
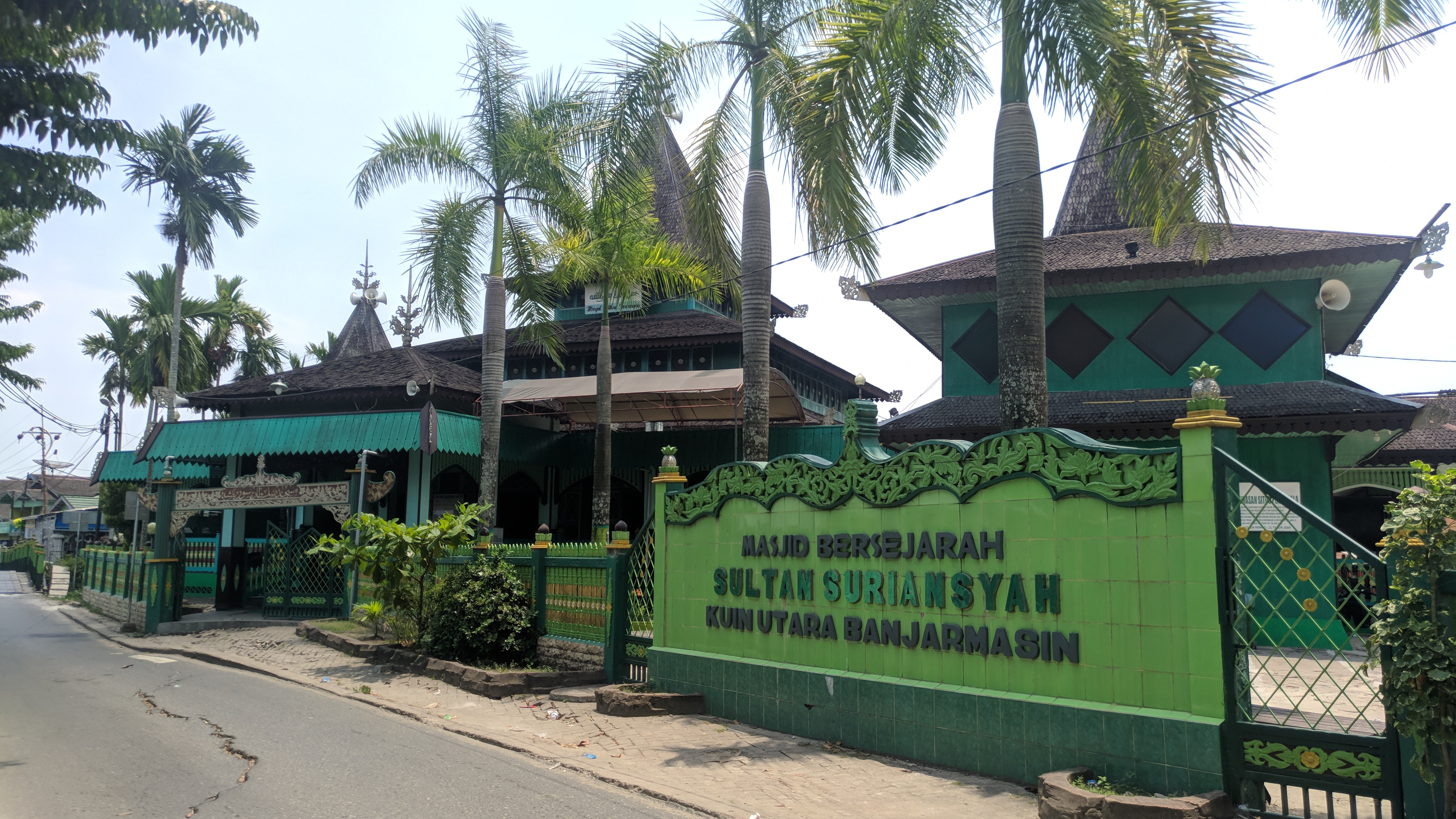
- Downtown Banjarmasin seen from above Floating market Menara Pandang Soetji Noerani Chinese temple Sultan Suriansyah historical mosque

- Flag Coat of arms
- Nicknames: Kota Seribu Sungai "City of Thousand Rivers"
- Motto: Kayuh Baimbai (Banjar) "Rowing Together"
- Interactive map of Banjarmasin
- Location within Indonesia
- Coordinates: 03°19′12″S 114°35′33″E
- Country: Indonesia
- Province: South Kalimantan
- Metropolitan area: Banjarbakula
- Established: 24 September 1526

Government
  - Mayor: Muhammad Yamin HR
  - Vice Mayor: Ananda
  - Legislature: Banjarmasin City Regional House of Representatives (DPRD)

Area
  - City: 98.37 km^{2} (37.98 sq mi)
  - Metro: 6,737.70 km^{2} (2,601.44 sq mi)
- Elevation: 1 m (3.3 ft)

Population (mid 2025 estimate)
  - City: 682,360
  - Density: 6,937/km^{2} (17,970/sq mi)
  - Metro: 2,076,771
  - Metro density: 308.231/km^{2} (798.316/sq mi)
- Time zone: UTC+8 (WITA)
- Area code: +62 511
- Vehicle registration: DA
- HDI (2024): ▲0.805 (Very High)
- Website: www.banjarmasinkota.go.id

Banjarmasin (Jawi: بنجر ماسين) is the largest city in South Kalimantan, Indonesia. It was the capital of the province until 15 February 2022. The city is located on a delta island near the confluence of the Barito and Martapura rivers. Historically the centre of the Banjarese culture, and the capital of the Sultanate of Banjar, it is the biggest city in South Kalimantan and one of the main cities of Kalimantan. The city covers an area of 98.37 km^{2} (37.98 sq mi) and had a population of 625,481 as of the 2010 Census and 657,663 as of the 2020 Census; the official estimate as of mid 2025 was 682,360 (comprising 341,375 males and 340,985 females). It is the third most populous city on the island of Borneo.

Greater Banjarmasin, also known as Banjarbakula (an acronym for Banjarmasin-Barito Kuala-Tanah Laut) or Banjar Raya, is an urban agglomeration of over two million people covering an area of 6,737.70 km^{2} (2,601.44 sq mi), which includes Banjarbaru city and parts of Banjar Regency (including Martapura town), Barito Kuala Regency, and Tanah Laut Regency, and accounts for 2,076,771 inhabitants in mid 2024, amounting to almost half of the province's population.

Banjarmasin was the de jure seat of the South Kalimantan governor and the location of the provincial parliament, although some provincial buildings have been relocated to Banjarbaru. On 15 February 2022, the capital of South Kalimantan province was legally moved to Banjarbaru.

== History ==
Historical affiliations

Negara Dipa (1380–1478)
Negara Daha (1478–1520)
Banjar Sultanate (1520–1526)
Demak Sultanate (1526–1546)
Banjar Sultanate (1546–1621)
(Denmark–Norway) Kingdom of Denmark (1621–1636)
VOC (1636–1638)
Banjar Sultanate (1638–1701)
England (1701–1707)
Banjar Sultanate (1707–1787)
Dutch Republic (1787–1795)
Batavian Republic (1795–1806)
Dutch East Indies (1806–1809)
Banjar Sultanate (1809–1815)
(United Kingdom) Kingdom of Great Britain and Ireland (1815–1816)
Dutch East Indies (1817–1942)
Empire of Japan (1942–1945)
Dutch East Indies (1945–1949)
Indonesia (1949–today)

=== Etymology ===
"Banjarmasin" is thought to be a corrupted version of "Bandar Masih" (Port Masih), which was named for Patih Masih, who ruled the port and the surrounding villages. Patih Masih's name may have been a nickname. Masih originates from the Ngaju language. Oloh Masi refers to the coastal-dwelling Malay population in the language of the Dayaks, who lived in the interior and visited the port regularly to trade. Some of the Dayaks eventually settled in the port. They eventually contributed to the culture of the Banjar people, along with the Javanese and Malays.

=== Early history ===
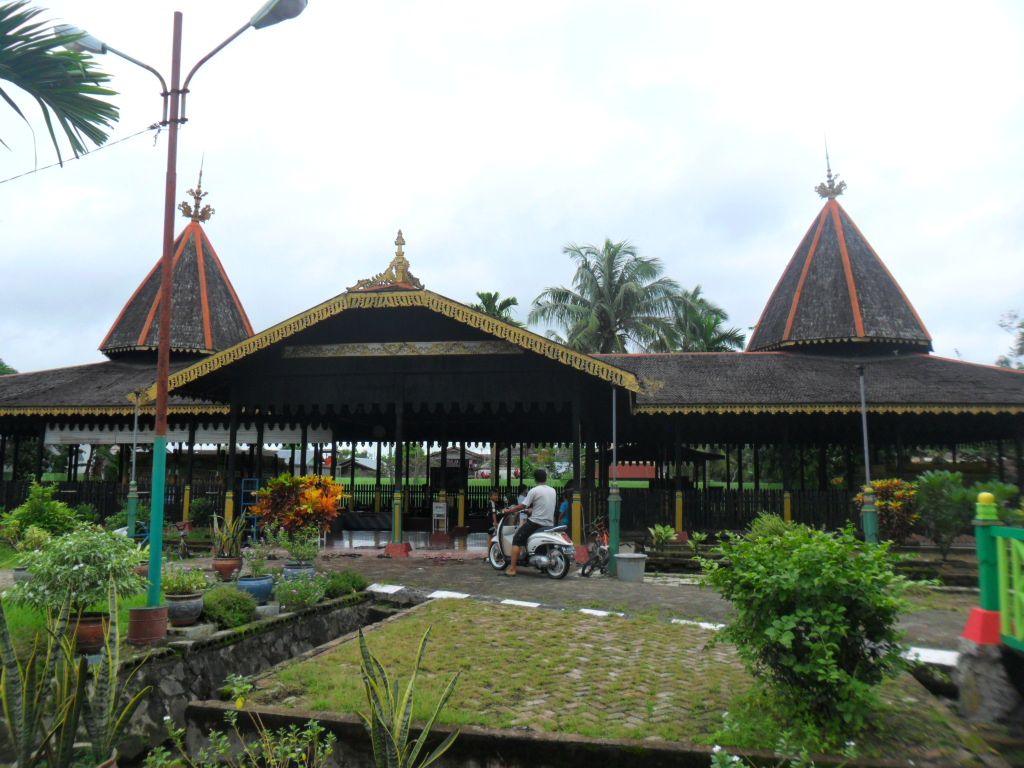
Burial complex of Sultan Suriansyah, first sultan of Banjar

European archeologist H. Kupper discovered several prehistoric sites around the region in 1939 and found implements such as choppers and other stone tools. Most of the artifacts found around the region and the province show signs of Neolithic culture. Migration from mainland Asia to Borneo may have been common while they were connected by the Sunda Shelf. Many stone tools have been found in Awang Bangkal, 50 km (31 mi) from the city.

Until the early 15th century, there were few written records found from the region. Outside records indicate it was home to several kingdoms such as Tanjungpuri—theorized to have been founded by Malay people from Srivijaya—and Negara Daha and Dipa, which were founded by Javanese people from Majapahit. Hinduism and Buddhism entered the region between the first and 15th centuries. There are two candis (temples) left in the region, Candi Laras and Candi Agung. The Ma'anyan people may have ruled the oldest kingdom in the archipelago, Nan Sarunai. Its existence is disputed; speculated by archeologists based on several carved stone tombs and a Ma'anyan folk song called "Usak Jawa", which is thought to tell the story of the Majapahit conquest of the kingdom.

The existence of Banjarmasin as a polity in southern Borneo has already been recorded in various foreign records, dating back as far as the 14th century, two centuries before the founding of the Sultanate of Banjarmasin in 1526. The oldest possible mention of Banjarmasin in foreign historical records comes from the account of Odoric of Pordenone, a Franciscan friar and explorer from Italy who lived in the late 13th century and journeyed through India, Indonesia, and China from 1318 to 1328. After his stop in Java, Odoric recalled his experiences of visiting a place called "Thalamasin":

Near to this country is another which is called Panten, but others call it Thalamasyn. The king whereof hath many islands under him. Here be found trees that produce flour, and some that produce honey, others that produce wine, and others a poison the most deadly that existeth in the world. [...] As for the trees that produce flour, 'tis after this fashion. These are thick, but not of any great height. They are cut into with an axe round about the foot of the stem, so that a certain liquor flows from them resembling size. Now this is put into bags made of leaves, and put for fifteen days in the sun; and after that space of time a flour is found to have formed from the liquor. This they steep for two days in sea-water, and then wash it with fresh water. And the result is the best paste in the world, from which they make whatever they choose, cates of sorts and excellent bread, of which I, friar Odoric, have eaten: for all these things have I seen with mine own eyes. And this kind of bread is white outside, but inside it is somewhat blackish.

Henry Yule, a Scottish Orientalist, identified "Thalamasin" with Banjarmasin. He proposed that "Thalamasin" or "Thalamasyn" is a corrupted form of the Malay phrase Tanah Masin ("the land of salt"). Yule argued that the geographical and cultural descriptions of "Thalamasin" point specifically to the southern region of Borneo, making its identification with Banjarmasin highly probable. Based on Odoric's account, Yule inferred that the inhabitants of Banjarmasin at the time subsisted primarily on sago rather than rice. Yule further noted that while Odoric's description of sago processing contains inaccuracies, likely due to his unfamiliarity with the method, it nonetheless constitutes a significant historical record of the economic life and agricultural practices in Banjarmasin during that period. Additionally, Yule interpreted Odoric's reference to trees yielding both honey and wine as evidence that the local population utilized the sap of the sugar palm not only to produce an alcoholic beverage (palm wine) but also to make palm sugar and a molasses-like sticky concoction, most likely dodol.

Odoric also mentioned about the custom of local inhabitants of "Thalamasin" in using a weapon that fits with the physical description of sumpit, a traditional blow-pipe that is usually used by the Dayak people for hunting. The section indicates the inhabitants of the polity were Dayaks or following Dayak ways of life as described:

And the men of this country being nearly all rovers, when they go to battle they carry every man a cane in the hand about a fathom in length, and put into one end of it an iron bodkin poisoned with this poison. And when they blow into the cane, the bodkin flieth and striketh whom they list, and those who are thus stricken incontinently die.

Another earlier mention of Banjarmasin comes from the 14th-century Chinese book Daoyi Zhilüe (島夷誌略, "A Brief Account of Island Barbarians"). Written by the Yuan dynasty Chinese traveler Wang Dayuan and completed in 1349, the work includes a section describing a country called "Pa-nan-pa-hsi" (巴南巴西). William Woodville Rockhill, an American linguist and diplomat, identified "Pa-nan-pa-hsi" as Banjarmasin in his translation of the Daoyi Zhilüe. He suggested that this may represent one of the earliest, if not the first, mentions of Banjarmasin in Chinese historical records. The section describes the country as follows:

This country is south of the Ta-hsiang-shan (大響山) and spreads out many tens of li. The soil is poor; they raise beans. The temperature has sudden changes to cold. The customs are treacherous. Men and women are small in size and black; their eyes are round, their ears long, their arms reach to below their knees. They wear but a simple ssi-jung (絲絨). All the girls of this people who are pretty are taught by their parents from the age of seven to sing and dance. They can perform acrobatic feats, do impersonations and endless other uncommon acts. When they go to other countries and show their talents they are rewarded with small coins. The native products include very fine cotton, which the traders buy with tin.

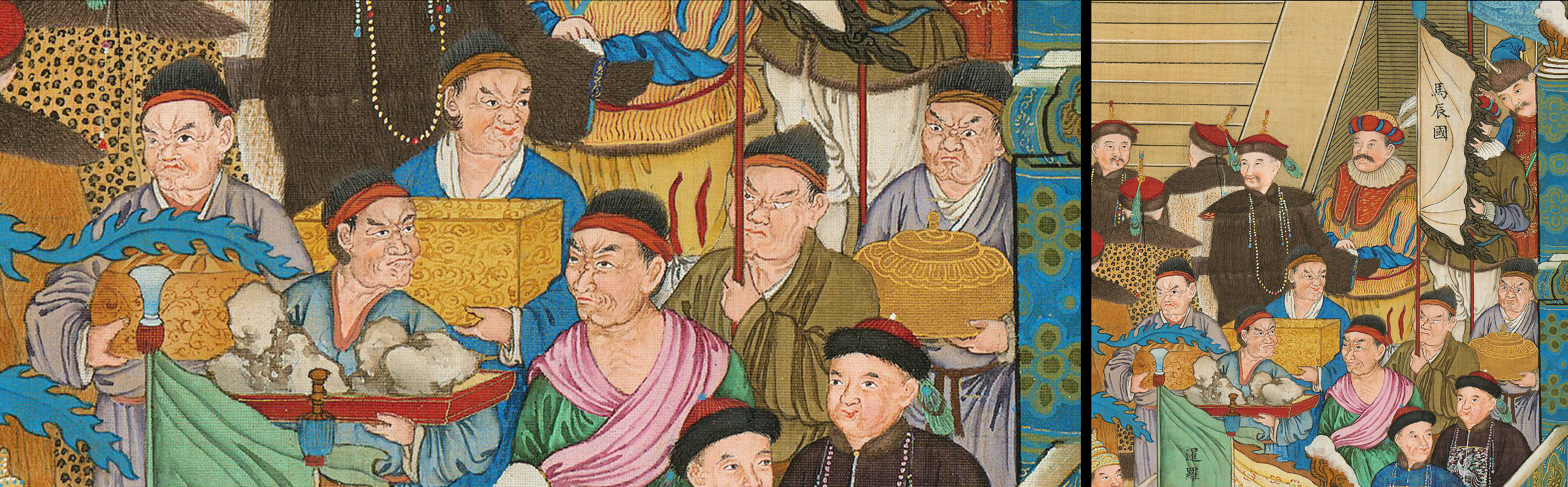
Banjarmasin delegates (馬辰國) paid tributes to the Qing emperor in Beijing, as depicted on Ten Thousand Nations Coming to Pay Tribute (1761).

The history of Banjarmasin itself began during the founding of the Sultanate of Banjar. According to folk stories and the Hikayat Banjar, Sukarama, the fourth king of Negara Daha, wanted his grandson, Raden Samudra, to be his successor in the kingdom instead of his direct son Prince Tumenggung. Prince Tumenggung later banished Raden Samudra and tried to reclaim the throne for himself. Raden Samudra fled to the region that would later be known as Banjarmasin. There, he met Patih Masih. Under Samudra's leadership, the port grew into the town of Bandar Masih. Tumenggung, who disliked Samudra's growing power, wanted to invade the town. Samudra allied with the Demak Sultanate, which agreed to help him. In return he would have to convert to Islam if he won. With the help of expeditionary forces from Demak, Samudra defeated the Tumenggung forces and proclaimed the Banjar Sultanate. He changed his name to Sultan Suriansyah I. The sultanate became more reliant on the Demak to the point that it was considered their protectorate. However, between 1546 and 1550, as conquests and the spice trade enriched the sultanate, it became independent and stopped sending tributes to Java. Nevertheless, Banjarmasin is one of two countries located in the present-day Indonesia which depicted in the Qing dynasty era monumental painting, Ten Thousand Nations Coming to Pay Tribute (萬國來朝圖 Wànguó láicháo tú); the other is Sunda Kelapa. The monumental painting depicts foreign delegations visiting and bringing presents and tributes to the Qianlong Emperor in the Forbidden city in Beijing during the late 1750s.

=== Colonial era ===
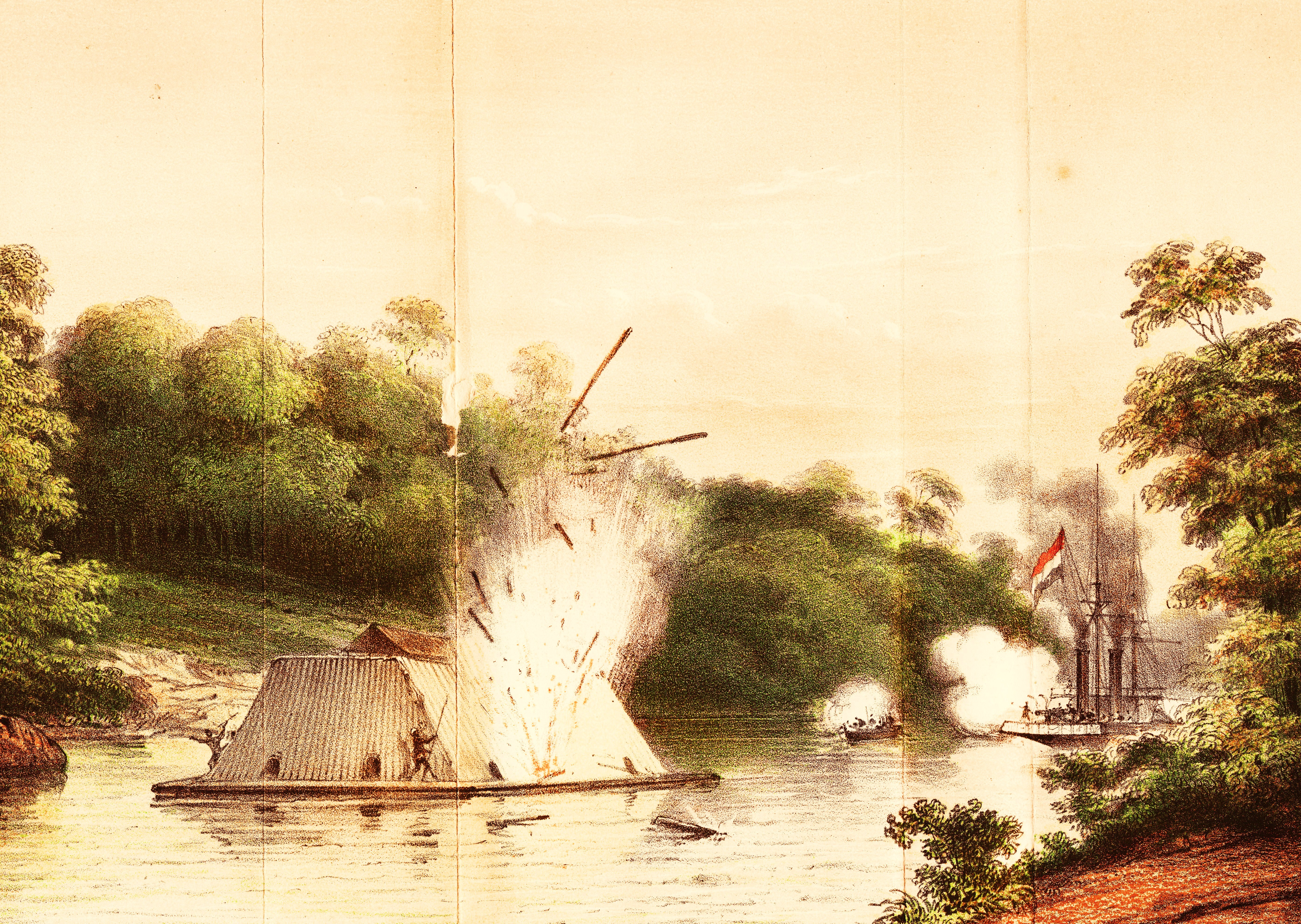
Engagement between Banjarese kotta mara (floating fortress) against Dutch steam ship Celebes, 6 August 1859

The first contact between Europeans and the Banjar people in the region came through trade. Starting in 1596, this mostly took place in Banten. European traders, largely Dutch, did not bother visiting the port until Banten's rulers banned them. The traders resorted to attacking ships from other countries, including ships under the Banjar Sultanate, to steal nutmeg. The Sultan took revenge against a Dutch ship visiting Banjarmasin on 17 July 1607 by hijacking it and massacring the crew. Similar incidents occurred several times between 1603 and 1636, ending when the sultanate reached a trade agreement that put the Dutch East India Company in control of the nutmeg trade from the sultanate and gave it a monopoly over trade in Banjarmasin. The company was expelled in 1638, however, after the sultan waged a war against the Dutch and burned much of the company's possessions around the port.

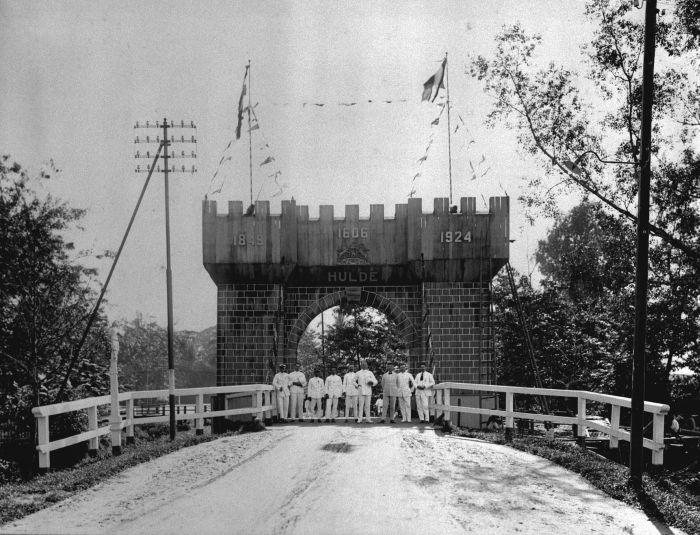
Fort Tatas, a Dutch fortress in Banjarmasin, 1924

Similarly, an English company agreed upon a treaty with the sultanate in 1698 but was expelled from the region in 1707. Following the Napoleonic Wars, Banjarmasin was subject to British control, a situation complicated by the Anglo-Dutch Treaty of 1814, which was seen to have mandated its transfer to Dutch authority. This directive paradoxically conflicted with a prior 1812 treaty between the British East India Company and the sultanate, which prohibited the region’s transfer to any other European power. This issue was navigated by the then Governor of Java, John Fendall, who argued that the 1812 treaty’s conditions were still valid. Sovereignty was therefore effectively transferred from the British East India Company to the Sultan in late 1816, and not directly to the Dutch. The dispute over sovereignty was finally settled when the Sultan of Banjarmasin settled an agreement with the Netherlands in January 1817, effectively confirming Dutch control over the region. A succession crisis between Sultan Adam and Tamjidillah II and a dispute over resource control of coal mines resulted in a war between the sultanate and the Dutch East Indies Company which led to the end of the sultanate in 1863. The war continued until 1905 under an emergency government set up by the sultanate called Pagustian. The last resistance was put down with the capture of Queen Zaleha in 1906. As a result of the war, many Banjar people from Borneo migrated to Sumatra, Singapore, and Malaysia and formed communities there.

=== 20th century–present ===
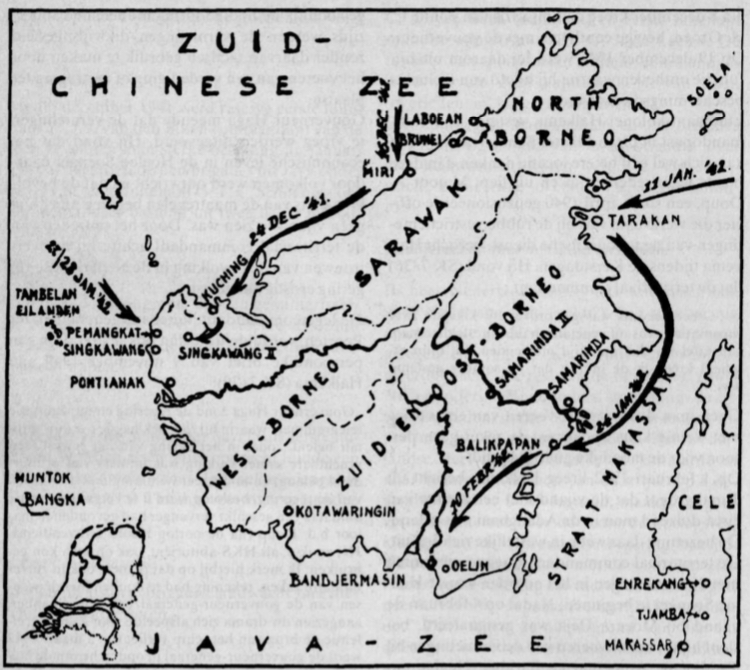
Route of Japanese attack on Borneo, 1942

When World War II broke out, the city was occupied by the Imperial Japanese Army. After the Battle of Banjarmasin, control was transferred to the Imperial Japanese Navy. Locals described Japanese rule under the navy as harsher compared to the army. This led many people to escape to Java, which remained under army rule. The city was liberated by Australian forces in September 1945. The return of Dutch rule, however, was opposed by the people and resulted in the Kalimantan Physical Revolution, four years of war between Indonesian nationalists and the Royal Netherlands East Indies Army. This ended with the Dutch recognition of Indonesia in 1949. The city was briefly assigned as the capital of Great Dayak federal state before being absorbed into a single Kalimantan province. It later became the capital city of the newly formed South Kalimantan province. Frequent flooding led to a plan to relocate the provincial capital city to Banjarbaru. The process continued until 2011, and the provincial parliament remains in Banjarmasin. Banjarmasin was granted city status by the Indonesian government in 1959 under Law Number 27 of 1959.

On 7 December 1996, Dirgantara Air Service Flight 5940 crashed to the gas factory after taking off near Syamsudin Noor International Airport, killing around 18 people. On 23 May 1997, the city witnessed a riot caused by friction between supporters of the United Development Party and Golkar. The riot later developed into looting, which targeted Chinese and Christian minorities and several shopping malls. At least 137 people were killed during the riots. The riot today is known by locals as Jumat Kelabu or Grey Friday.

On 15 February 2022, the capital of South Kalimantan province was legally moved to Banjarbaru.

== Geography ==
Banjarmasin is located in the Barito River's basin and is bisected by the Martapura River. The slope of the city is 0.13% and the land is generally flat and low-lying. The geological foundation of the city is dominated by clay and sandstone, but also includes alluvial sediments from the river. Several smaller rivers, all connected to either the Martapura River or Barito River, form a dendritic drainage pattern. The city's river system is affected by tides. The city is located in a swampy region and is generally below water level, making it prone to being flooded by tidal bores.

The area of city proper is 98.37 km^{2} (37.98 sq mi), around 0.26% of the provincial area. It borders the Barito Kuala Regency in the north and west and the Banjar Regency in the east and south.

=== Climate ===
Banjarmasin has a tropical monsoon climate (Köppen Am) bordering on a tropical rainforest climate (Af) and characterised by heavy rainfall from November to June and moderate rainfall from July to October. The monthly temperature is always around 26 °C or 78.8 °F with an average maximum temperature of 33 °C or 91.4 °F and average minimum temperature of 22 °C or 71.6 °F. However, there is a slight variation of seasonal temperatures because of monsoons. Rainfall averages about 2,300 millimetres or 91 inches annually. The hottest months are between March and September when the temperature can reach an average as high as 36 °C or 96.8 °F. The average amount of sunshine is 2.8 hours per day during the rainy season and 6.5 hours during the dry season.

January is the wettest month, with air humidity sitting between 75 and 90% in January; September is the driest, with humidity of 52% in September.

Climate data for Banjarmasin (Syamsudin Noor International Airport) (1991–2020 normals)
Month	Jan	Feb	Mar	Apr	May	Jun	Jul	Aug	Sep	Oct	Nov	Dec	Year
Mean daily maximum °C (°F)	32.2 (90.0)	32.4 (90.3)	32.7 (90.9)	33.0 (91.4)	33.2 (91.8)	32.8 (91.0)	32.7 (90.9)	33.4 (92.1)	33.9 (93.0)	33.9 (93.0)	33.2 (91.8)	32.3 (90.1)	33 (91)
Daily mean °C (°F)	26.3 (79.3)	26.4 (79.5)	26.5 (79.7)	26.7 (80.1)	26.9 (80.4)	26.5 (79.7)	26.1 (79.0)	26.2 (79.2)	26.5 (79.7)	26.8 (80.2)	26.6 (79.9)	26.2 (79.2)	26.5 (79.7)
Mean daily minimum °C (°F)	23.7 (74.7)	23.8 (74.8)	23.9 (75.0)	24.1 (75.4)	24.1 (75.4)	23.5 (74.3)	22.6 (72.7)	22.3 (72.1)	22.6 (72.7)	23.3 (73.9)	23.8 (74.8)	23.8 (74.8)	23.5 (74.3)
Average rainfall mm (inches)	334.1 (13.15)	291.4 (11.47)	261.4 (10.29)	211.3 (8.32)	152.5 (6.00)	124.6 (4.91)	92.2 (3.63)	56.6 (2.23)	63.7 (2.51)	122.0 (4.80)	232.0 (9.13)	357.4 (14.07)	2,299.2 (90.52)
Average rainy days (≥ 1.0 mm)	20.7	17.2	17.3	14.9	13.5	11.6	9.5	6.4	6.6	11.9	16.5	21.1	167.2
Mean monthly sunshine hours	99.9	95.1	117.7	130.1	148.3	134.0	150.1	159.5	146.6	136.5	118.3	93.4	1,529.5
Source: World Meteorological Organization

== Governance ==
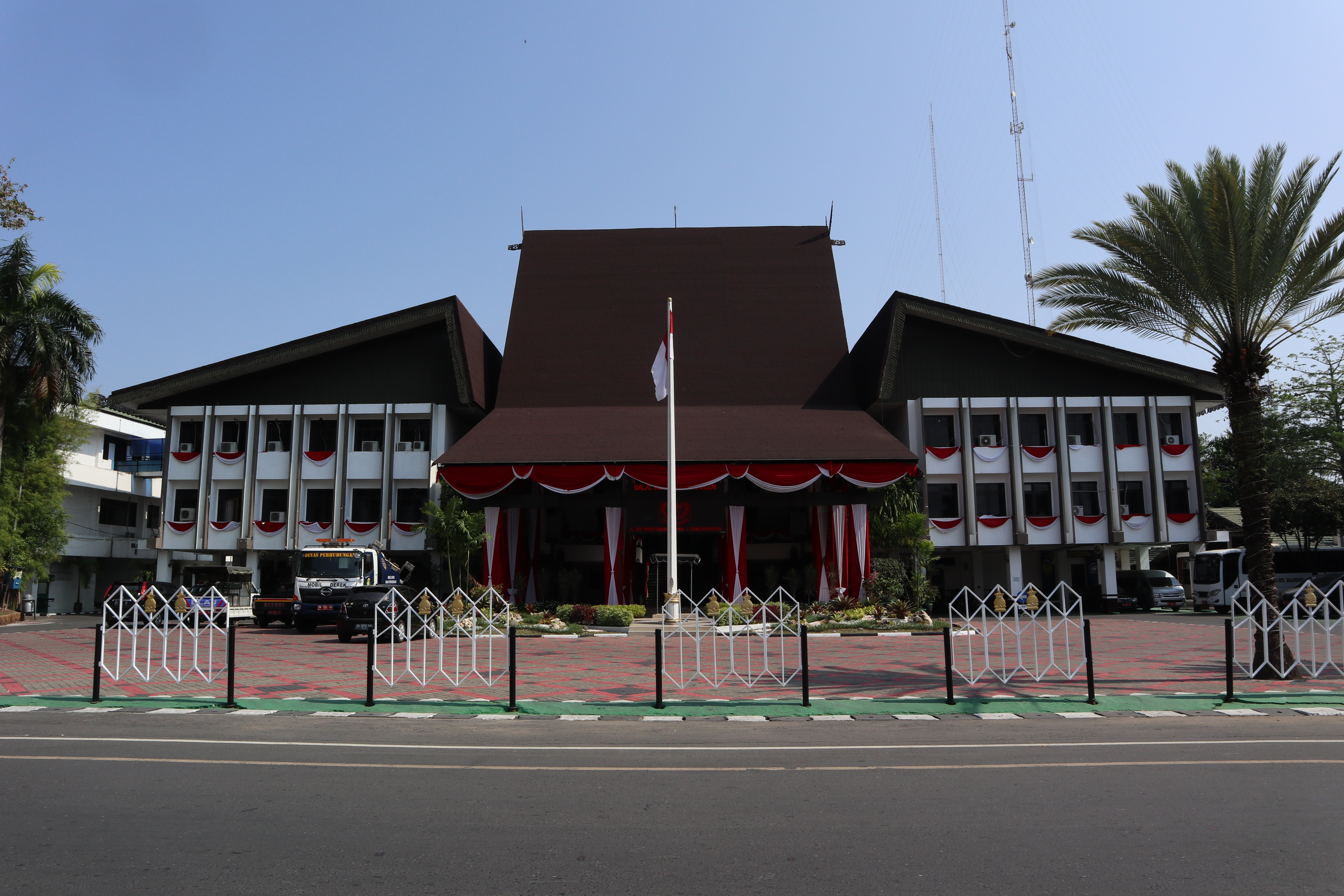
Banjarmasin city hall building

=== Administrative divisions ===
The city is divided into five districts (kecamatan). The most densely populated district is Central Banjarmasin with a density of 13,155 per square kilometre while the least densely populated district is South Banjarmasin with density of 4,281 per square kilometre. As of 2020, South, North, and East Banjarmasin district experienced population growth—South and North both by 1.10% and East by 0.58%; Central and West Banjarmasin both experienced declines of 0.46%. Their areas and populations at the 2010 Census and 2020 Census, together with the official estimates as of mid-2025, are tabulated below. The table also includes the locations of the district administrative centres, the number of urban villages (all rated as kelurahan) in each district, and its postal codes.

Kode Wilayah	Name of District (kecamatan)	Area in km^{2}	Pop'n Census 2010	Pop'n Census 2020	Pop'n Estimate mid 2025	Admin centre	No. of villages	Post code
63.71.01	Banjarmasin Selatan (South Banjarmasin)	38.24	146,068	163,948	171,288	Kelayan Selatan	12	70241: 70249
63.71.02	Banjarmasin Timur (East Banjarmasin)	17.71	111,912	118,389	126,073	Kuripan	9	70234 – 70239
63.71.03	Banjarmasin Barat (West Banjarmasin)	12.97	143,461	136,964	136,815	Pelambuan	9	70112 – 70245
63.71.05	Banjarmasin Tengah (Central Banjarmasin)	6.72	91,700	87,479	89,820	Teluk Dalam	12	70111 – 70241
63.71.04	Banjarmasin Utara (North Banjarmasin)	22.73	132,340	150,883	158,264	Alalak Utara	10	70121 – 70127
	Totals	98.37	625,481	657,663	682,360		52	

=== Local government ===
As with all Indonesian cities, Banjarmasin is a second-level administrative division run by a mayor and a vice mayor together with the city parliament, and is equivalent to a regency. Executive power is vested in the mayor and vice mayor, while legislative duties are vested in the local parliament. The mayor, vice mayor, and parliament members are directly elected by the people of the city in an election. Heads of districts are appointed by the mayor on the recommendation of the city secretary.

=== Politics ===
On the provincial level, Banjarmasin is part of South Kalimantan's first electoral district, which has 8 out of 55 representatives. On the city level, the city is divided into five electoral districts, which have a total of 45 parliamentary representatives. The last election was in 2019 and the next one is scheduled for 2024.

Electoral district	Region	Representatives
Banjarmasin 1st	Central Banjarmasin District	6
Banjarmasin 2nd	North Banjarmasin District	10
Banjarmasin 3rd	East Banjarmasin District	8
Banjarmasin 4th	South Banjarmasin District	11
Banjarmasin 5th	West Banjarmasin District	10
Total		45

== Banjarbakula (Greater Banjarmasin) ==
The Banjarmasin metropolitan area comprises two complete cities (Banjarmasin and Banjarbaru), together with large parts of three regencies as follows:

Name of City or Regency	Area in km^{2}	Pop'n Census 2020	Pop'n Estimate mid 2024
Banjarmasin (city)	98.37	657,663	681,693
Banjarbaru (city)	305.15	253,442	285,546
Banjar Regency (part ^{(a)} )	1,756.75	507,240	521,819
Barito Kuala Regency (part ^{(b)} )	1,593.27	250,078	262,951
Tanah Laut Regency (part ^{(c)} )	2,984.16	305,898	324,762
Total Banjarbakula	6,737.70	1,974,321	2,076,771

Notes: (a) 14 out of 20 districts. (b) 12 out of 17 districts. (c) 10 out of 11 districts (all except Kintap District).

== Economy ==
BCA branch in Banjarmasin

The city's economy is dominated by manufacturing, which accounts for 17.19% of its gross regional product (GRP) as of 2020. The second largest sector is trade, which accounts for 12.57% of the city's GRP, followed by the finance sector at 12.29%. The agriculture sector is small, contributing only 2.43% of city's GRP. Mining is nonexistent within the city, in stark contrast to neighbouring regions. In 2019, economic growth was 6.38%. However, in 2020 there was an economic downturn caused by the COVID-19 pandemic, resulting in a decrease of 1.91%. The city imports 1,900,000 long tons (1,900,000 t) of goods through its main port, the Port of Trisakti, and exports 98,320,000 long tons (99,900,000 t) of goods as of 2019. Movement of goods increased 92.24% between 2018 and 2019. Banjarmasin experienced 4.15% yearly inflation in 2019.

=== Industry ===
Around 62% of industry in Banjarmasin is focused on food and drink processing and related products. This includes bread, flour, and soybean sauce production. Other industries include rubber and plastic manufacturing, which account for about 15% of the city's industrial output. The rest of the industrial output is from machinery, pharmaceuticals, paper products, and electrical equipment.

There are 3,014 industrial companies registered in the city as of 2020, employing a total of 22,063 people. There are also smaller-scale industries producing wood furniture, clothing, and snacks, with 88 registered smaller-scale businesses in these sectors as of 2020.

=== Tourism ===
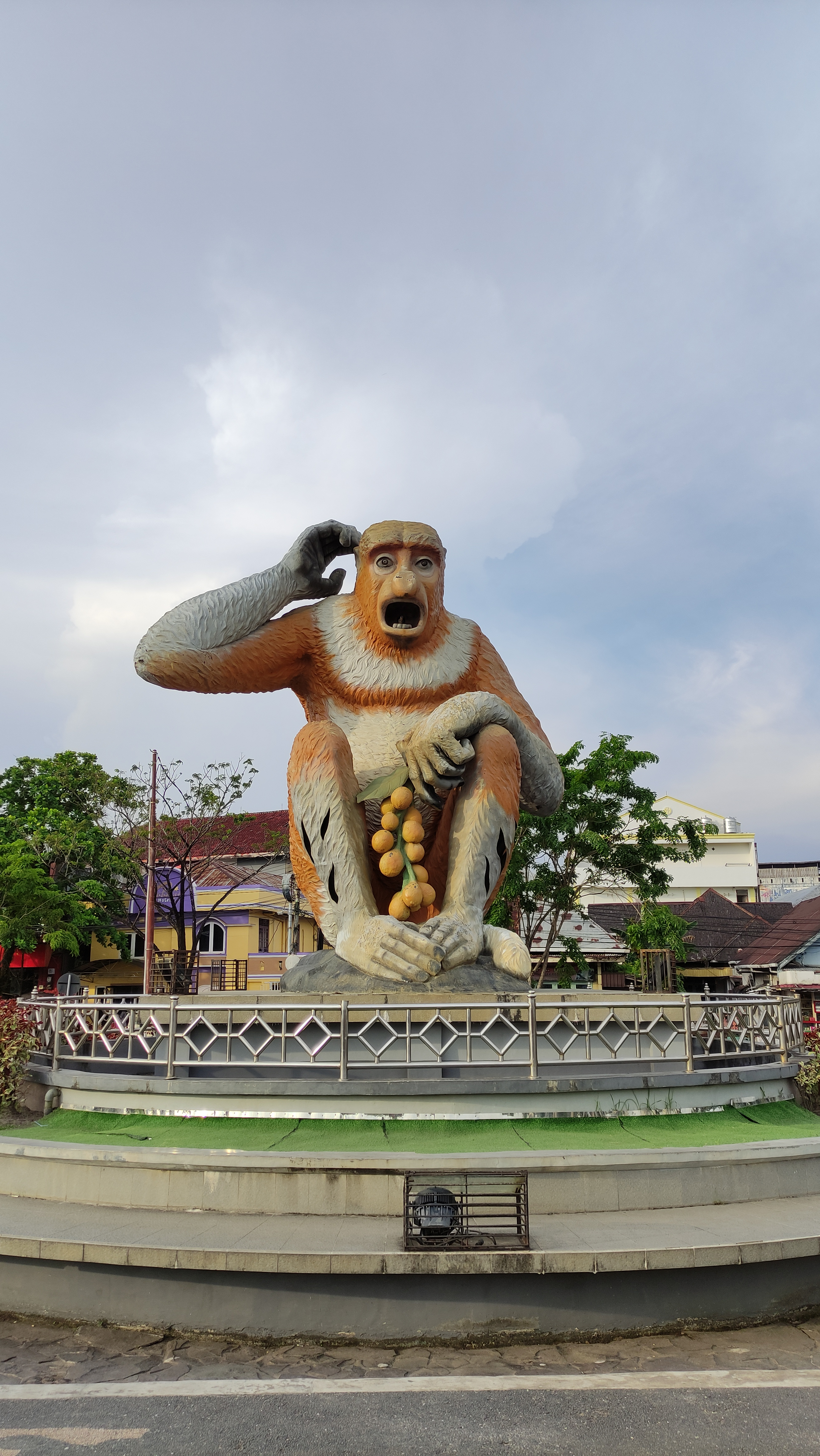
The Bekantan Statue is a landmark of the city of Banjarmasin

The city has 129 hotels registered as of 2020. The city was visited by 109,653 domestic tourists and 251 foreign tourists that year. According to Statistics Indonesia, in 2020 there were 113 identified potential tourist spots in the city. Tourism, however, remains a small sector in the city's economy.

=== Finance ===
The finance sector in general has been grew steadily from 2015 to 2019, with an annual growth of around 3%. Basic financial services account for 67% of this sector, followed by pension funds and insurance services with 14.94%. The city accounts for 67.61% of financial activities in the entire province, both in local and foreign currencies.

== Demographics ==
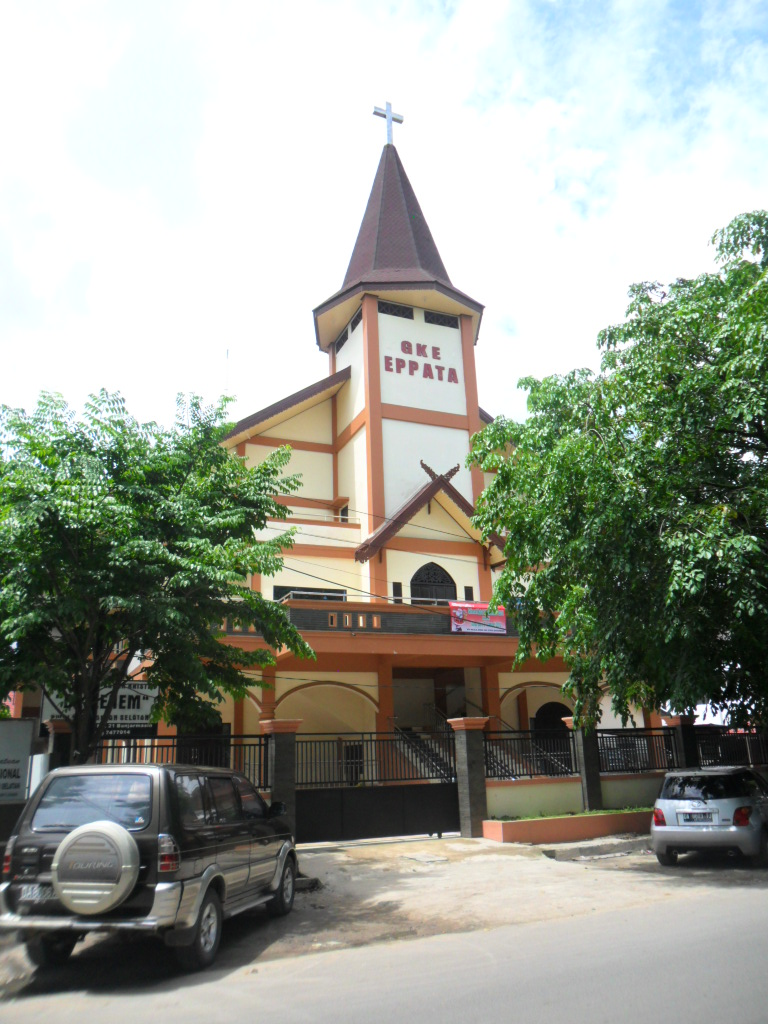
A church in Banjarmasin

According to Statistics Indonesia, a resident of the city is defined as "someone who resides within the city for at least 6 months or less than 6 months but with intention to settle". The estimated number of residents in 2020 was 657,663 with a sex ratio of 100.36 male per 100 female. 47.87% of the city population resides in the South and North Banjarmasin districts. As with most of Indonesian cities, the population is young and consists of a workforce within the reproductive age of above 15, which in the city is around 62.07% of the city's population in 2020, or 331,526 people. Annual population growth was 0.44% between 2010 and 2020. East and Central Banjarmasin district. however, has a sex ratio of 98.84 and 97.47 male per 100 female respectively, which means both districts have more female residents than males. This differs from the city average. The city's dominant religion is Islam, with a minority of Protestants, Catholics, Hindus, Buddhists, Confucianists, and animist religions. Muslims make up around of the city's population, followed by Christians (both Catholics and Protestants) at around other religions combined total about

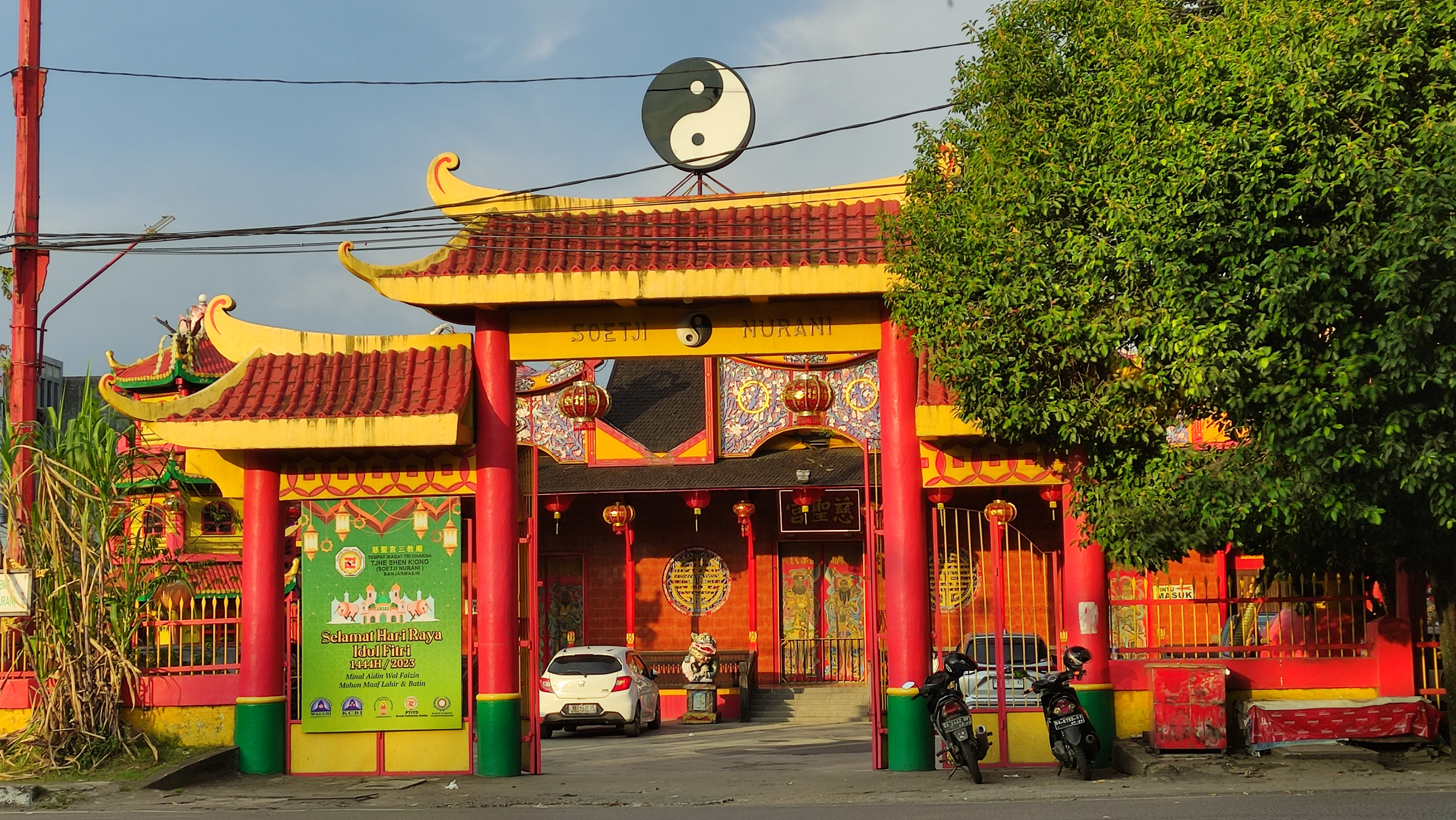
Soetji Nurani Temple

Most of the city's population identifies as Banjarese—79.26% did so in 2010. Other ethnicities include Javanese with 10.27%, Malays with 9.27%, Madurese with 3.17%, Chinese Indonesian with 1.56%, Dayak with 0.92%, and Bugis with 0.6%. There is also a small population of Arabs and Indians that dates back to the Sultanate and colonial era.

== Education ==
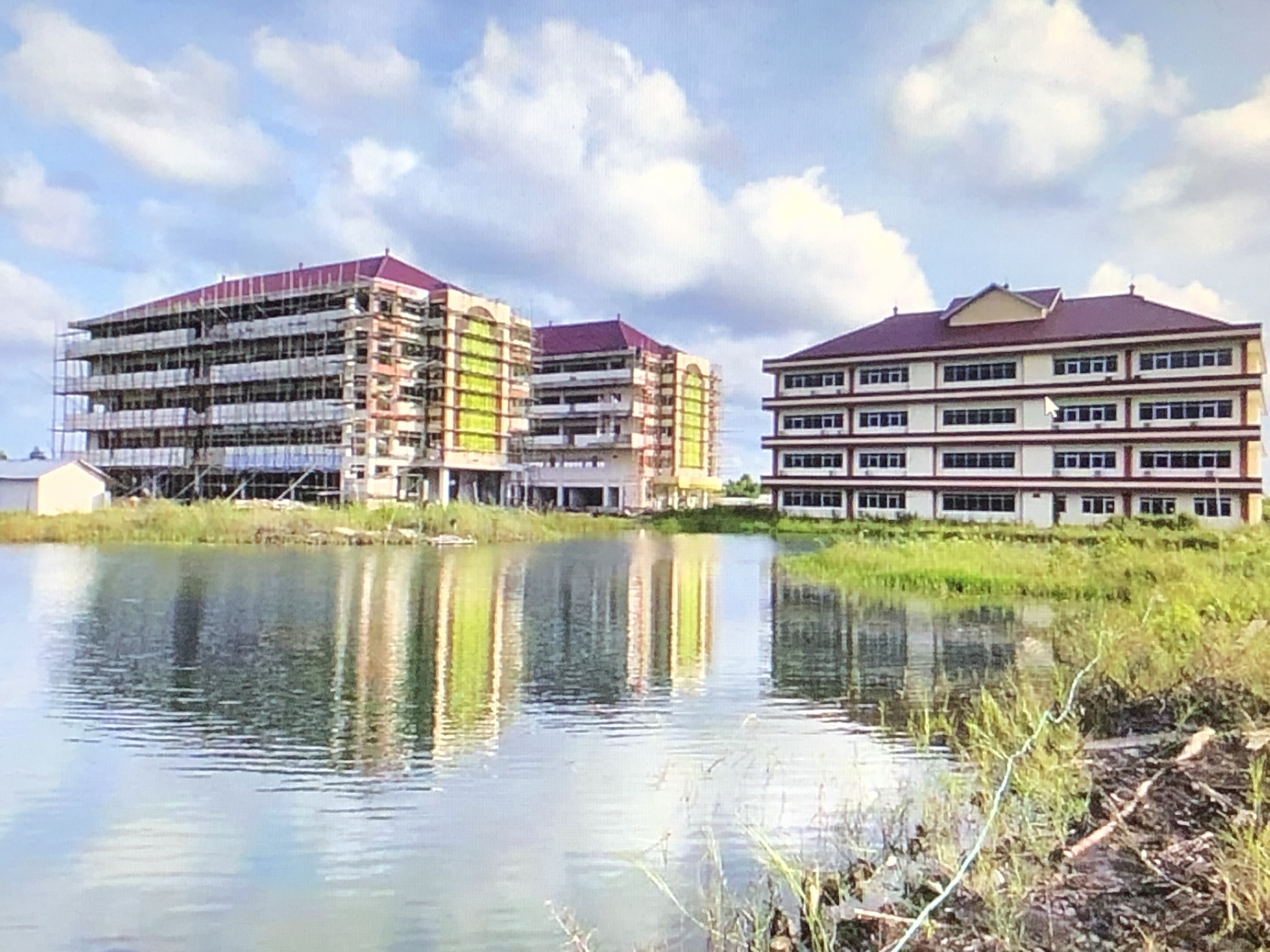
Muhammad Arsyad Al Banjari Islamic University of Kalimantan in Banjarmasin

The literacy rate in 2020 was 98.94%. There are 311 kindergartens, 208 elementary schools, 35 junior high schools, and 29 senior high schools as of 2020. There are also 22 vocational high schools in the city. The city is home to more than 25 higher education institutions and universities. One of the most notable, which is also a public university, is the Lambung Mangkurat University. The university has more than 2,000 graduates every year—most of them majoring in teaching and science education, followed by economics and business, engineering, agricultural science, and medical subjects. In 2020, there were 700 postgraduate students. A developed education system and the existence of educational institutions attract students from neighbouring regions to pursue their education in the city. Other notable private universities, such as the Muhammad Arsyad Al-Banjari Kalimantan Islamic University, have the greatest number of students. According to Indonesian Statistics, in 2020 there 11,854 male and 8,189 female students. The school participation rate was 97.91% as of 2020.

== Healthcare ==
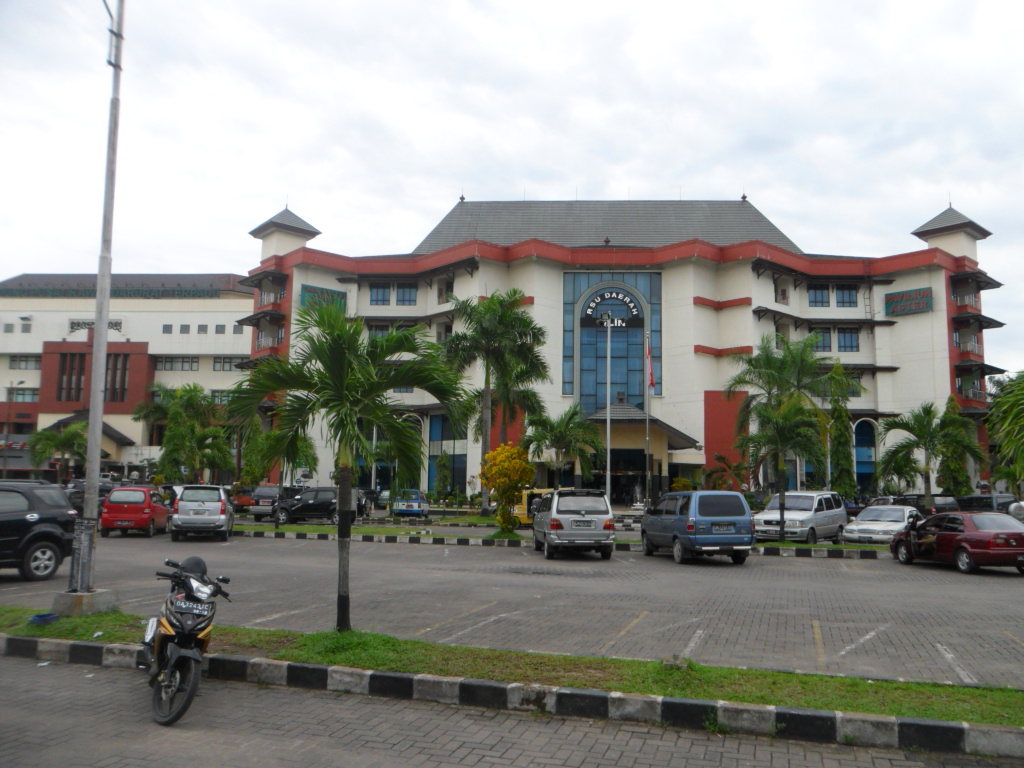
Ulin Regional Hospital building

The city has eight hospitals and 34 polyclinics as of 2020. There are also 26 puskesmas (community healthcare centres), 26 healthcare centres, and 47 pharmacies. The main and largest hospital in the city is Ulin Regional Hospital, which is owned by the provincial government; it is classified as an A-type hospital by the Ministry of Health. Life expectancy in the city as of 2020 was 71.13 years, which is significantly above the provincial average.

As of 2020, 511,118 people of the total city population of 657,663 are registered in the BPJS Kesehatan, government-mandated social insurance which covers certain healthcare costs. 89% of newborn babies in 2020 were vaccinated with basic vaccines such as polio vaccine, MMR vaccine, and Hepatitis B vaccine. Around 95% of newborn babies are born inside a healthcare or maternity facility, while 99.98% of births are assisted by healthcare workers.

== Culture and entertainment ==
=== Banjarese culture ===
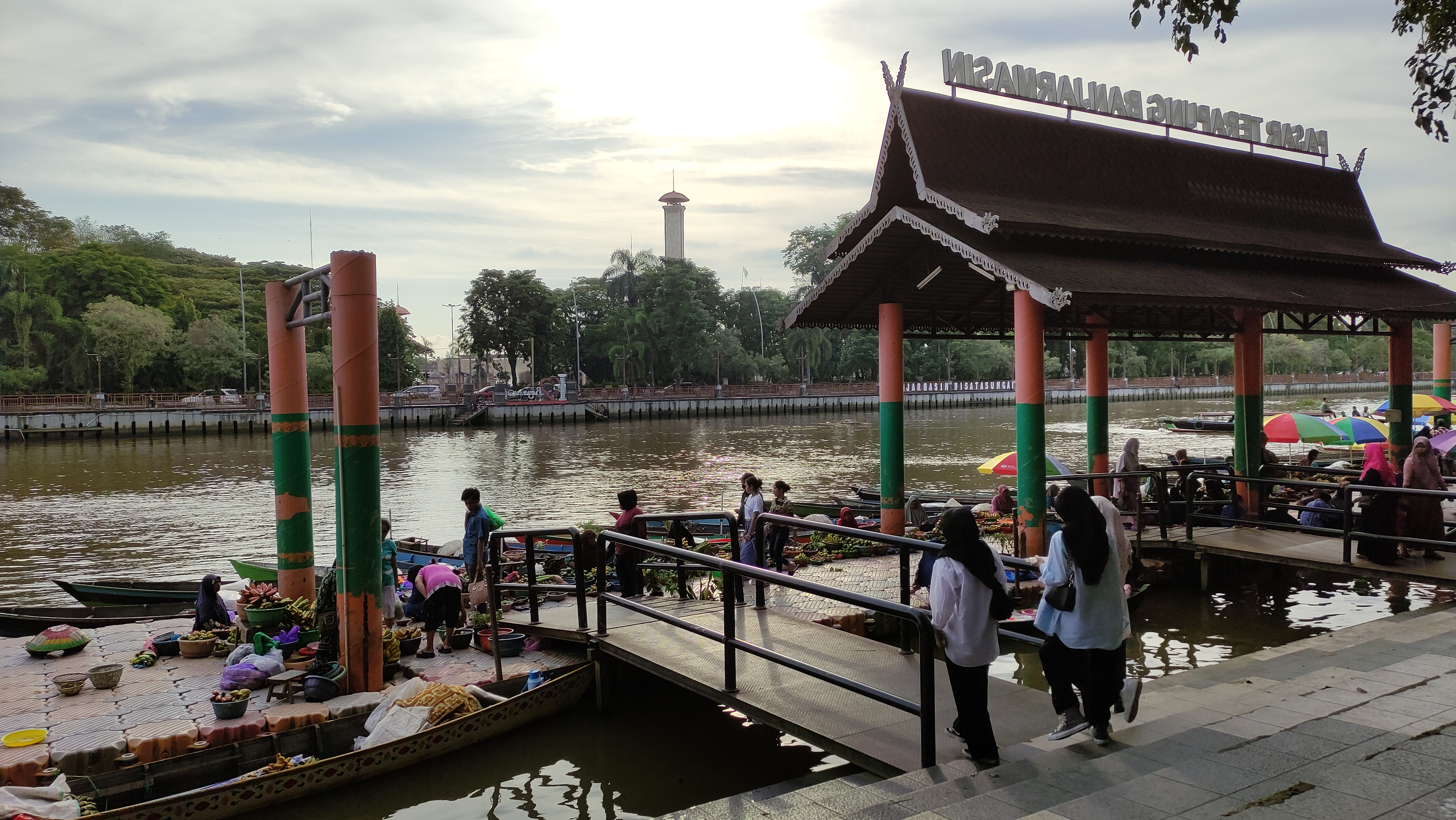
Floating Market in Banjarmasin

The city's dominant culture is that of the Banjar people, which have characteristics described as those of a "river culture" and are influenced by other ethnicities such as Dayak, Javanese, Malay, Arab, and even Persian. Despite being a Muslim majority, the Banjar people still hold on to the importance of cultural parts that have been influenced by their Hindu-Buddhist past. This includes the Malanuh ceremony, which is an offering to supernatural beings. One annual event that is celebrated widely by the people of the city is Haul Guru Sekumpul, an event commemorating the death of a charismatic ulema from the region, Zaini Abdul Ghani.

Another famous cultural sight in the city is a floating market located on the Kuin River and Lok Baintan. People meet on the river after Fajr prayer until around 07:00 pm and transactions with the merchants are done from small boats. Small snacks, vegetables, fruits, meat, and many other groceries are sold at the market. This market is dying, however, and the number of merchants has declined because of the shift from river culture to land culture and competition with regular land markets. The city is home to a cultural center building surrounded by a cultural park where traditional artists can often be seen performing. The building and its surrounding has been used regularly to hold cultural events to preserve Banjarese culture, as well as to facilitate local artists.

=== City parks ===
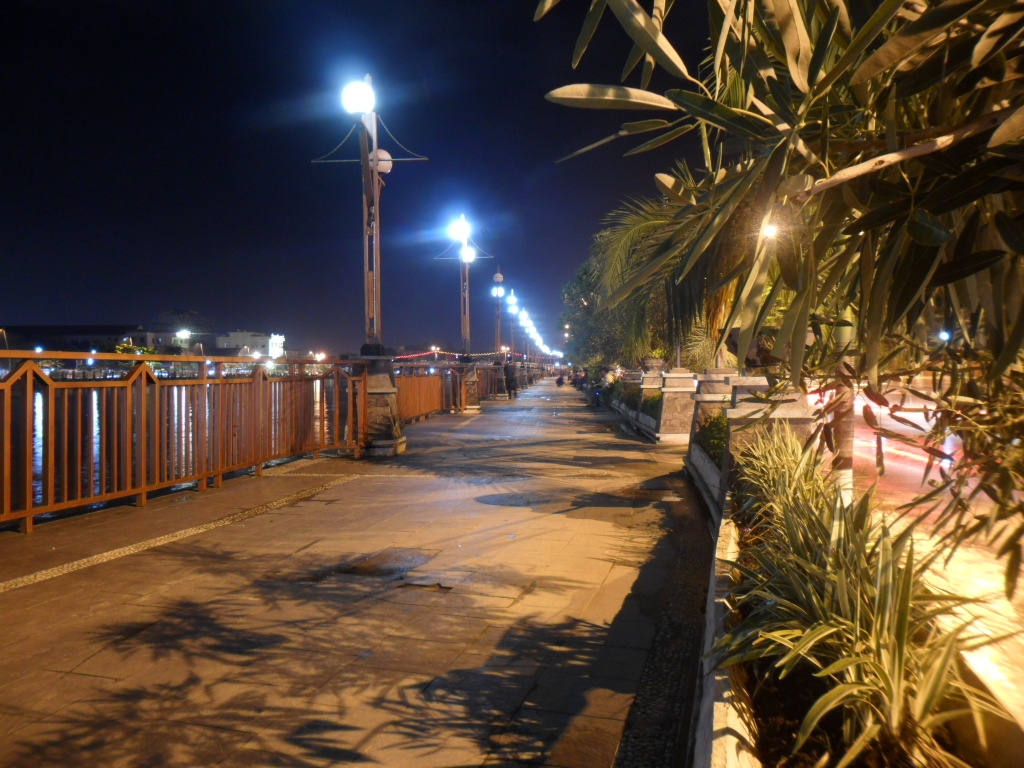
Siring Park at night

There are several city parks and public spaces in the city, one of the most notable being Siring Park, located in the center of the city. Sometimes referred to by locals as "0 Kilometer Park", the park is located on the shores of the Martapura River and also acts as a waterfront for the river with docks for small boats in the river. Facilities in the park include a watchtower, several gazebos, pedestrian roads, and skateboard parks. In front of the park, there is an urban bus stop used by both Trans Banjarmasin & BRT Banjarbakula bus companies. In addition, the park includes one of the city's landmarks, a 6.5 m (21 ft) statue of a bekantan (Proboscis monkey) which is a native primate in the region. The park is also a center for street foods in the city during dusk.

Other city parks include Kamboja Park, Bungas Banjarmasin Park, and Banua Anyar Public Space. Located 2 km (1.2 mi) from the city center, Banua Anyar Public Space is specifically designed for toddlers and kids. It is located below Banua Anyar bridge and has facilities such as a kids' park, artificial soft grass to ensure child safety, and book reading corners.

=== Others ===
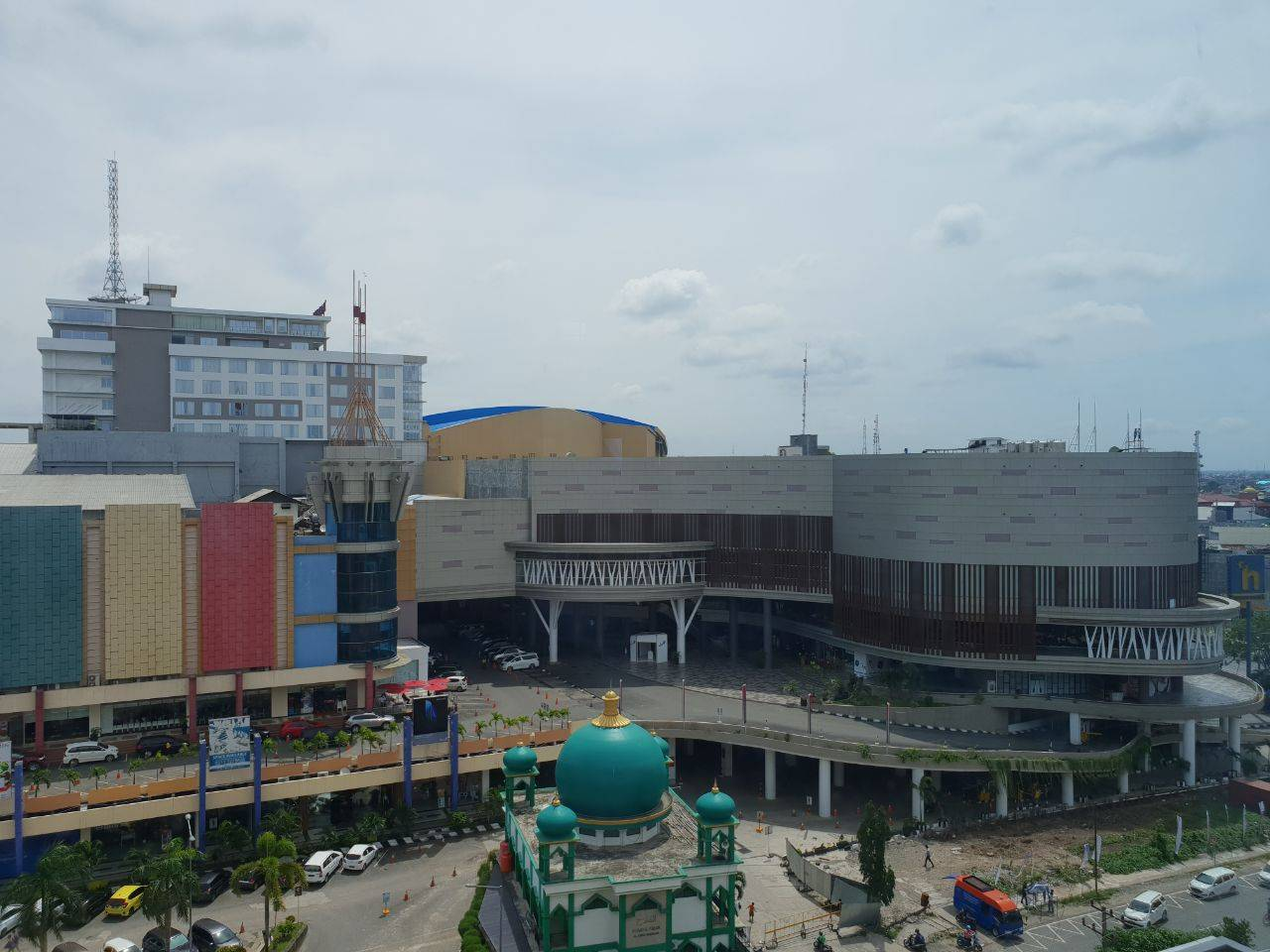
Duta Mall Banjarmasin is the biggest shopping mall in the city

Several shopping malls are located in the city. The Duta Mall Banjarmasin is the largest in the province, and connected to a hotel called The Mercure Hotel. Located in Central Banjarmasin district, it occupies more than 42,000 m^{2} (450,000 sq ft) and consists of four stories. It is also surrounded by several other buildings housing stores, forming a complex with a total area of 80,000 m^{2} (860,000 sq ft). Other entertainment centers in the city include Trans Studio Mini Banjarmasin, an indoor theme park which is owned by Trans Corp and malls such as Mitra Plaza, Lotte Mart, and Giant. Mitra Plaza is one of the city's oldest modern shopping centers, and was a target of looting and destruction during the Banjarmasin riot of May 1997. It was renovated after the riot. Other than modern shopping malls, according to Statistics Indonesia, as of 2019, there are 60 traditional markets registered in the city.

Mandai, a fermented food made from the pith of Artocarpus integer (cempedak) fruit or jackfruit, is a local specialty.

== Transportation ==
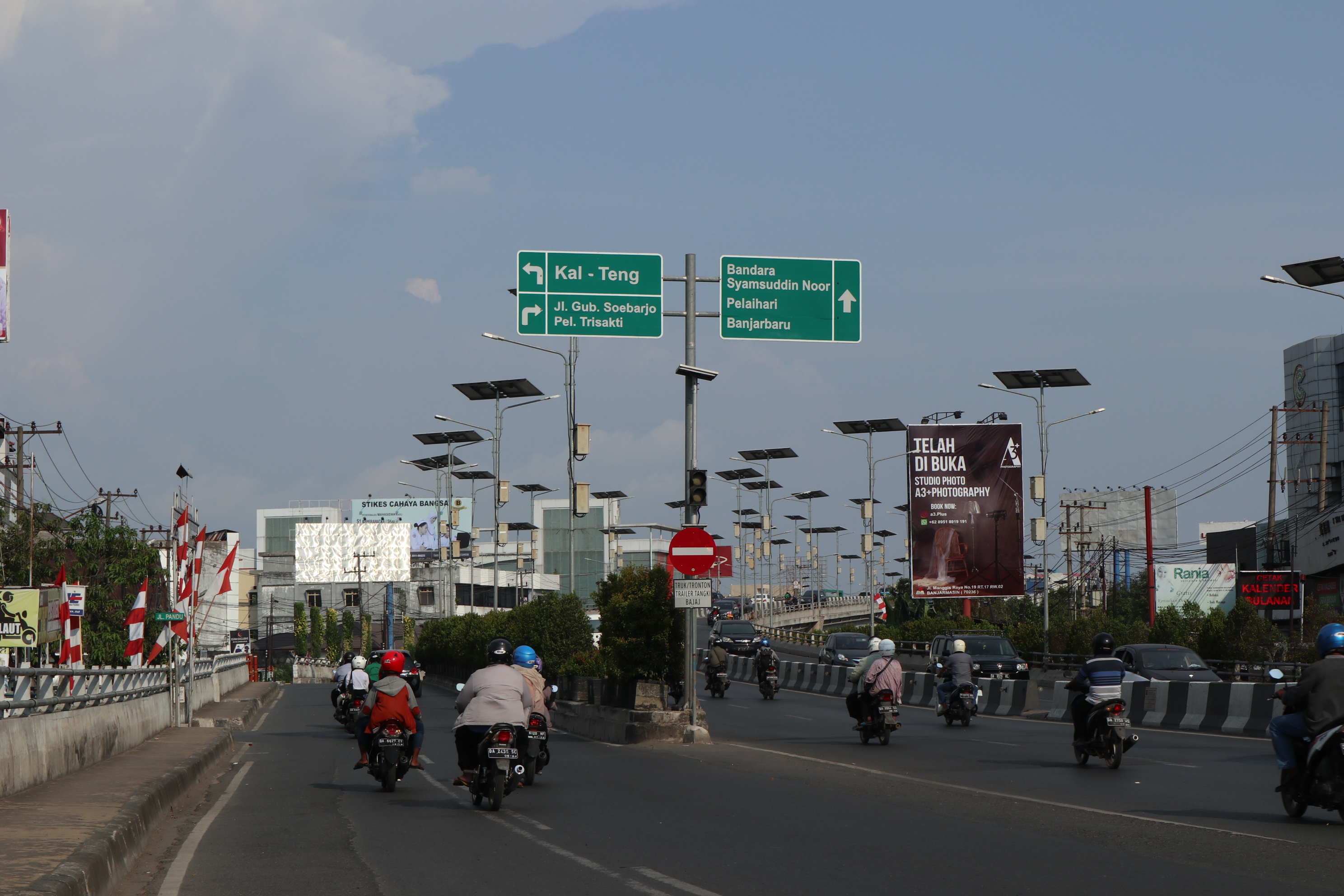
A flyover in Banjarmasin

The city has 790.13 km (490.96 mi) of road, most of which have been paved with asphalt. It is connected to the Trans-Kalimantan Highway Southern Route, which connects it to other big cities such as Palangka Raya and Samarinda. Kilometer 6 Bus Terminal is the main bus terminal for the city and the province, where buses for long inter-province routes gather. Being old and overcrowded, the government relocated the main terminal to the newly built Kilometer 17 Bus Terminal in Gambut District, Banjar Regency. However, the new terminal is rarely used and many bus operators resisted the relocation because of the remoteness of the new terminal from the city center.

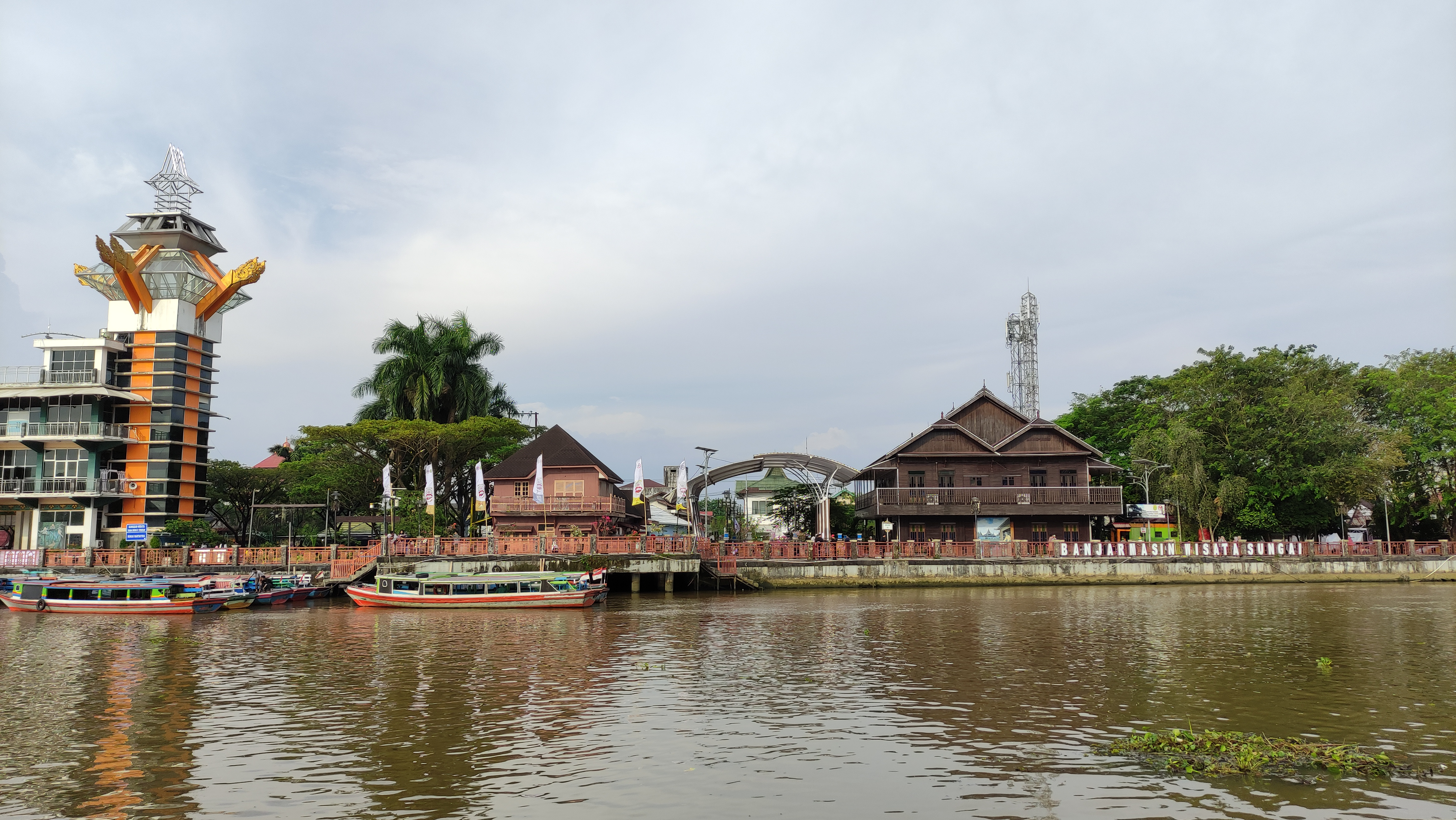
Martapura River in Banjarmasin City

Being divided by a big navigable river, speed boats on the river are also an important means of transportation within the city. Ride-hailing services such as Gojek and Grab are widespread. The city has three urban bus services, BRT Banjarbakula which connects it to the Greater Banjarmasin area and Trans Banjarmasin, which only serves the city proper. As with other Indonesian cities, the city has angkots (shared taxis), which have been declining rapidly because of competition from online ride-hailing services, online taxis, and new public transportation services created by the city government. On 22 December 2021, another urban bus system, Trans Banjarbakula, was launched which also covers the entire metropolitan area.

The city is served by the Port of Trisakti, which is one of main ports in Indonesia and classified as class IA. The port has a passenger terminal for passenger ships to neighbouring islands such as Java and Sulawesi. The closest airport is the Syamsudin Noor Airport, which located inside Banjarbaru city, 29 km (18 mi) from Banjarmasin.

== Media ==
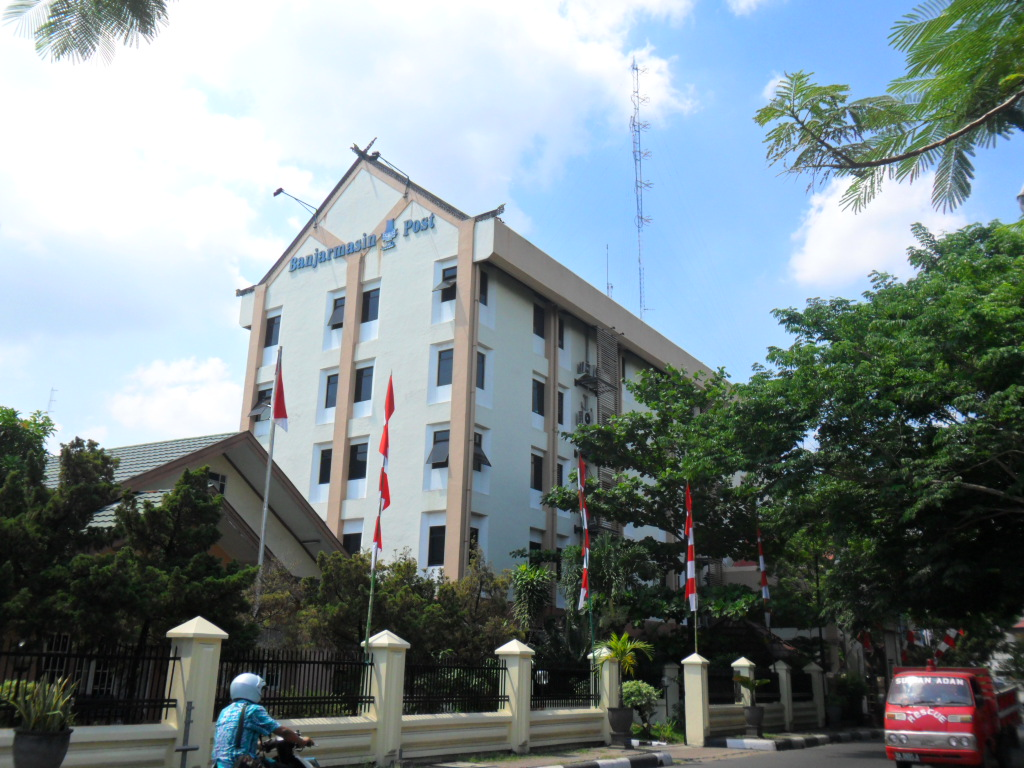
Banjarmasin Post office building

There are numerous newspapers, television stations, and radio based in Banjarmasin. The city is center of mass media in the province of South Kalimantan. Known established media groups such as Banjarmasin Post, Kalimantan Post, and Radar Banjarmasin existed since early New Order period, while numerous smaller independent media were founded mostly after Reformasi. Other example of news media are Barito Post, Mata Banua, Metro Banjar, and Kanal Kalimantan. In total, there were 47 registered news media including printed and online, 36 tabloids, and 4 magazines in the city.

In television sector, outside of nationwide networks both private and state-owned, there are local television stations focused mostly on local news. State-owned television network TVRI has local branch for South Kalimantan located in Banjarmasin, while Duta TV and Banjar TV, two most prominent local channels, are private.

The city also has a branch of Radio Republik Indonesia, an Indonesian state-owned radio network. According to the government source, there are 21 formally registered radio station.
