= Trans Banjarbakula =

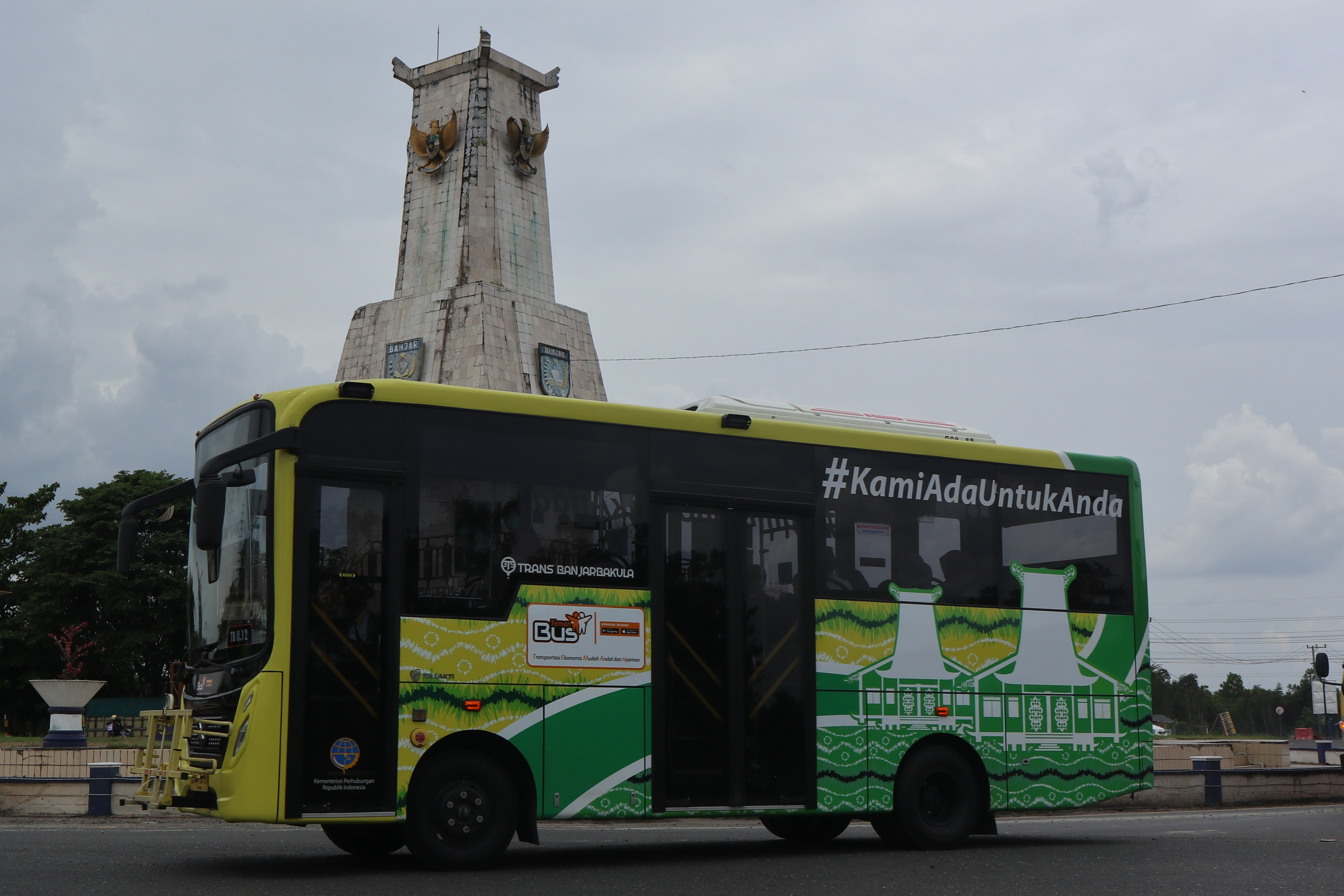

Overview
- Locale: Banjarmasin metropolitan area, Indonesia
- Transit type: Bus rapid transit
- Number of lines: 4
- Daily ridership: 6,000

Operation
- Began operation: 1 February 2022
- Number of vehicles: 80

Trans Banjarbakula, or informally known by locals as "Green Tayo", is a bus rapid transit system serving Greater Banjarmasin area and its surrounding including cities and towns of Banjarbaru and Martapura in Indonesia. It is one of three bus systems present serving the Banjarmasin metropolitan area, together with BRT Banjarbakula and Trans Banjarmasin.

Originally under the management of Ministry of Transportation and operated through "buy the service" scheme as part of "Teman Bus" program where the central government initiated urban bus systems in several major Indonesian cities, it has been transferred to the government of South Kalimantan province since 1 May 2024. It operates four routes, serving parts of Barito Kuala Regency, the entirety of Banjarmasin, Banjarbaru, parts of Banjar Regency, as well as parts of Tanah Laut Regency. In addition to the four main routes, there is also a feeder service serving five routes within the Banjarbaru city. The service operates 75 buses as of 2023, and later in 2024, the government expanded the number to 80. The fare cost is Rp 5,000 as of 2024 with special tariff given to the disabled and students. The payment is done with tap machine on the bus using electronic money cards.
