= Port of Trisakti =

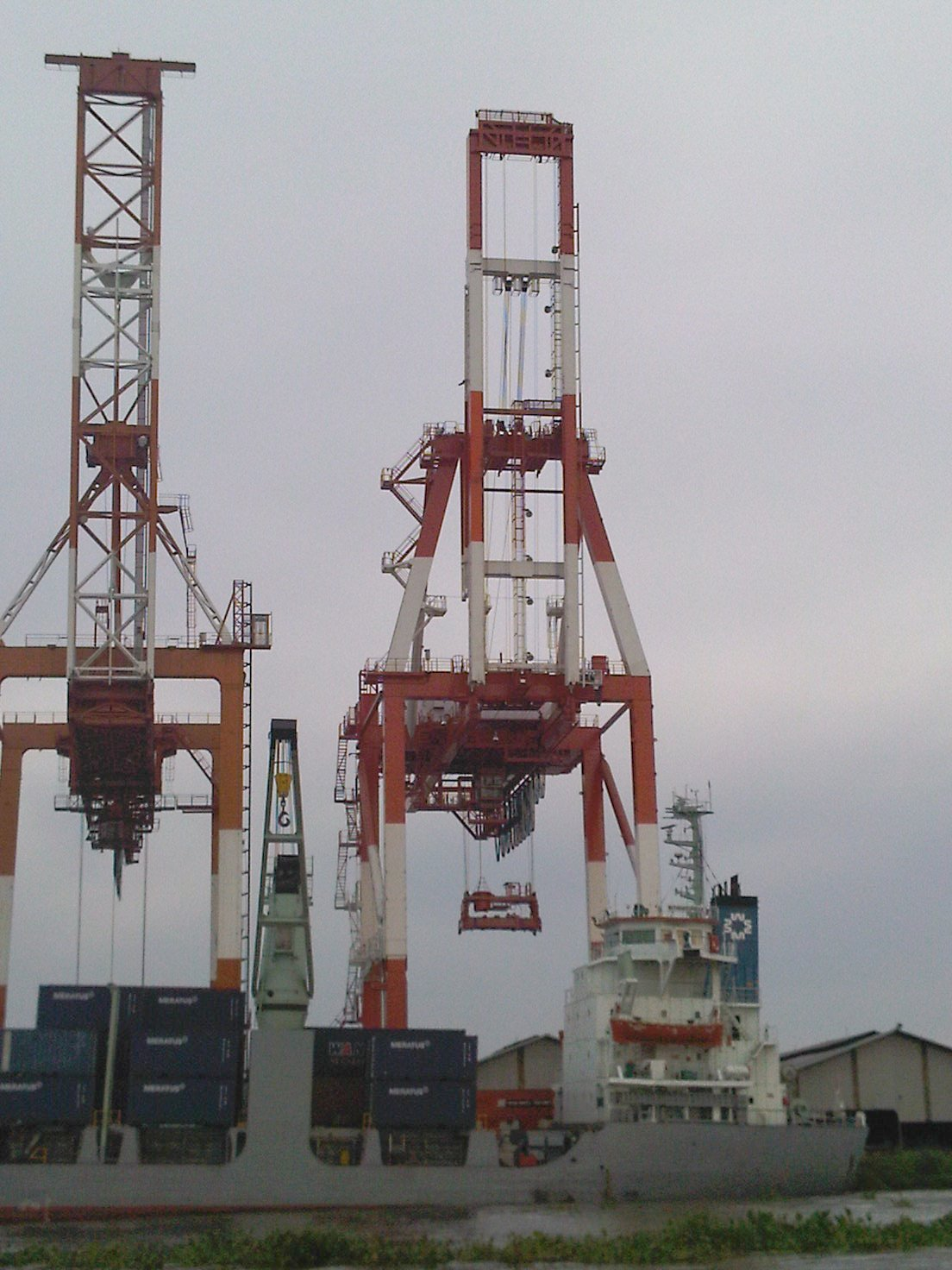
- Interactive map of Port of Trisakti
- Location in Indonesia

Location
- Country: Indonesia
- Location: Banjarmasin, South Kalimantan
- Coordinates: 3°19′52″S 114°33′29″E

Port of Trisakti (Indonesian: Pelabuhan Trisakti) is a seaport in Banjarmasin in South Kalimantan, Indonesia. It is one of the major ports in Borneo. The port is located on the Southwest of the Tatas Island, which is between the intersection of Barito River and Martapura River, with which it is connected to the Java Sea.
