= BRT Banjarbakula =

Indonesian bus system

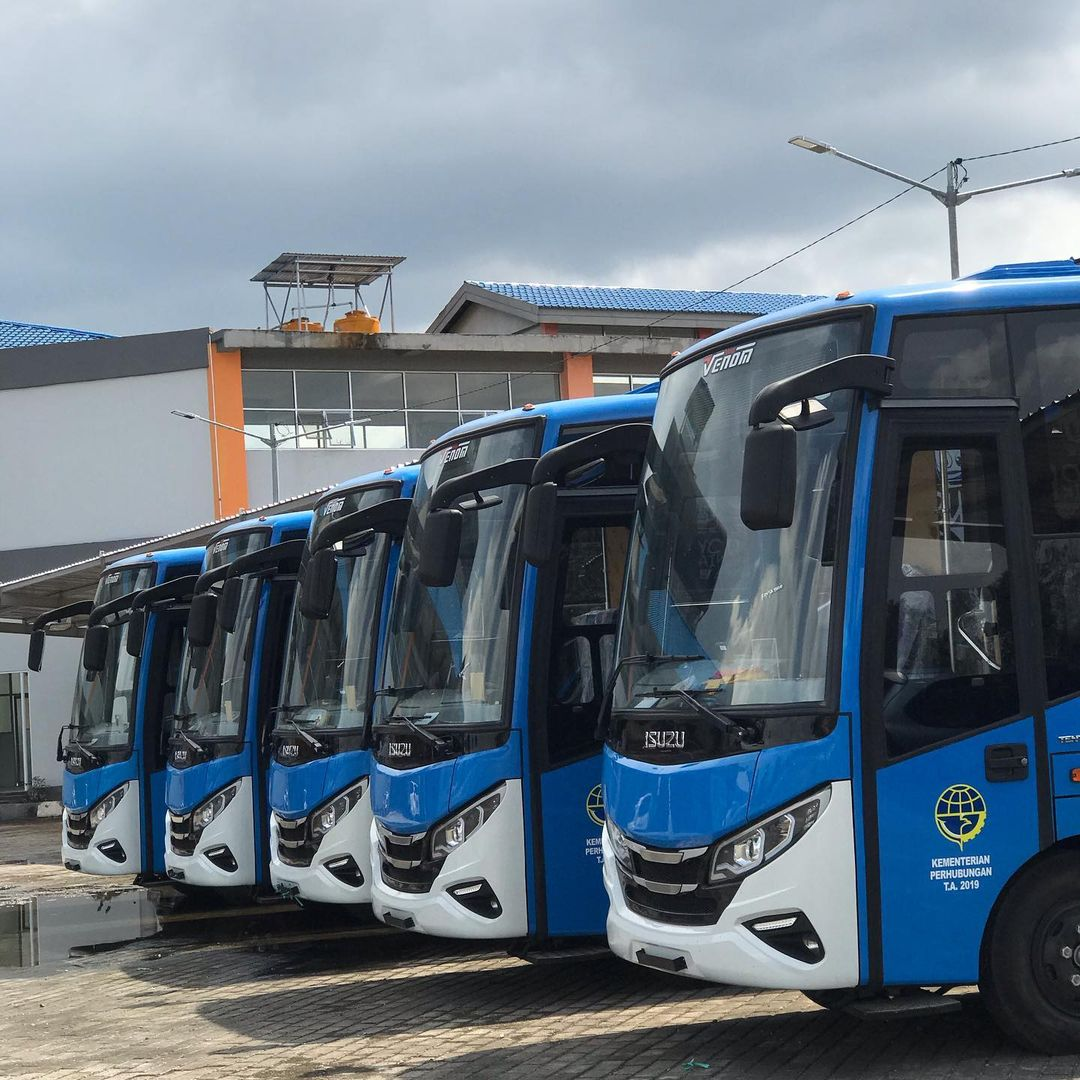
- Fleet of Banjarbakula BRT

Overview
- Native name: BRT Banjarbakula
- Area served: Greater Banjarmasin (Banjarbakula) area
- Transit type: Bus rapid transit
- Number of lines: 3
- Number of stations: 37 (as of 2019)

Operation
- Began operation: 14 August 2019; 7 years ago
- Operator: Ministry of Transportation

BRT Banjarbakula, also informally known as "Tayo bus", is a bus rapid transit (BRT) system serving Greater Banjarmasin metropolitan area, encompassing Banjarmasin, Banjarbaru, and parts of Banjar Regency in Indonesia. It comprises three routes and more than 37 bus stops as of 2019. After several months of trials with free service, it launched on 14 August 2019 to coincide with the celebration of 69 years since the creation of South Kalimantan province. The local government plans to expand the system to 6 routes and a total of 112 bus stops, encompassing the entire Banjar regency, Tanah Laut regency, and Barito Kuala regency; covering the entire metropolitan area with service. The government is also considering handing operations to a private firm in 2021 to boost its development. As of September 2020, recruitment of new drivers for the service was stalled because of the COVID-19 pandemic, hampering route and fleet expansion needed to keep up with demand.

During 2021 South Kalimantan floods, several terminals and bus stops were damaged and used by victims of flood as shelter, but according to officials the service were still operating as usual. During the annual event commemorating death of a charismatic ulema from the region, Muhammad Zaini Abdul Ghani, bus tickets are free for pilgrims.

== COVID-19 pandemic ==
After the outbreak of COVID-19 pandemic in the province, the number of passengers per bus was limited to a maximum of 12 people. New rules such as wearing masks and large-scale social restrictions were implemented. Hours of operation were also changed to 06:30–17:00 (Central Indonesia Time) from Monday to Friday and 08:00–15:00 on weekends and holidays.

== Gallery ==
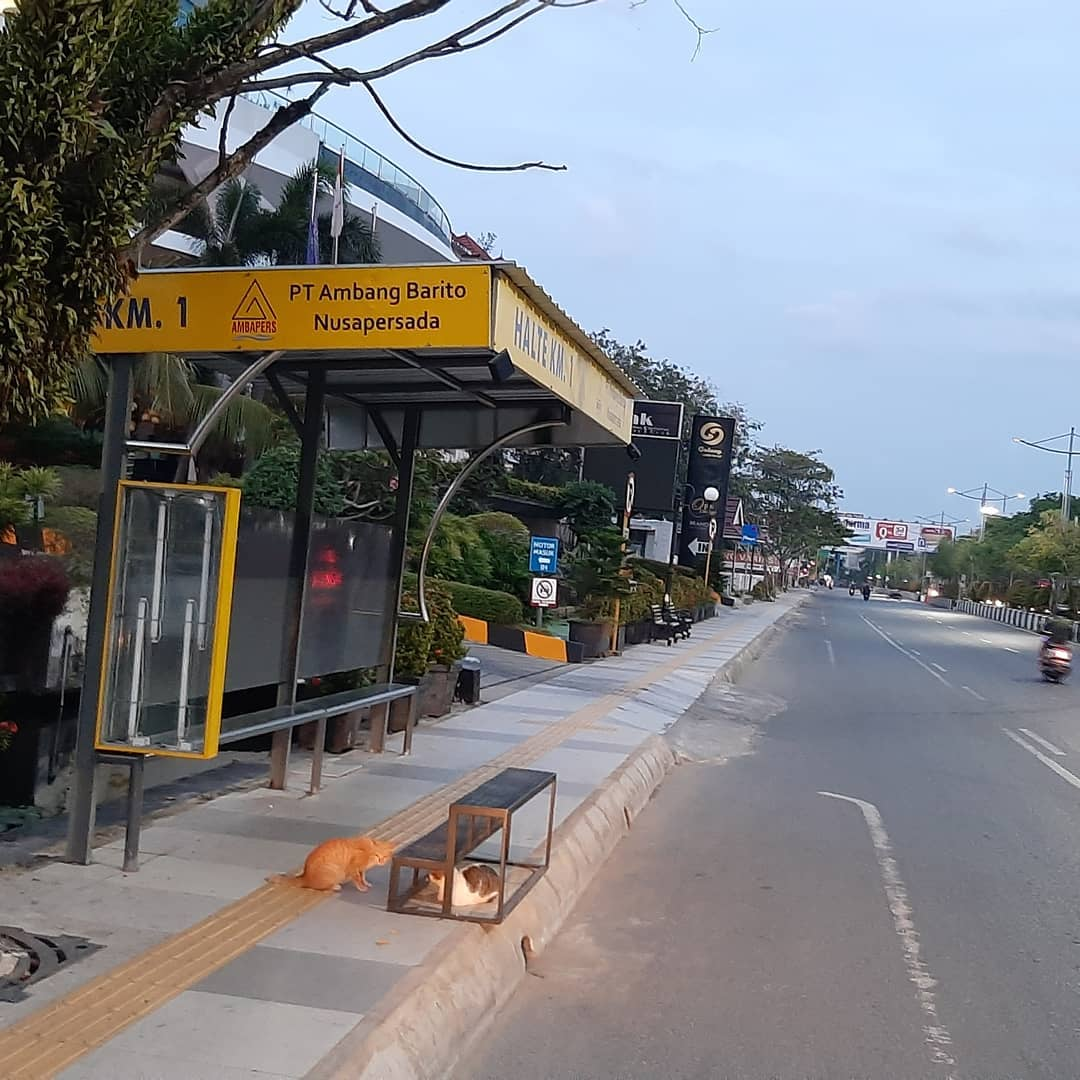
Golden Tulip bus stop in Banjarmasin

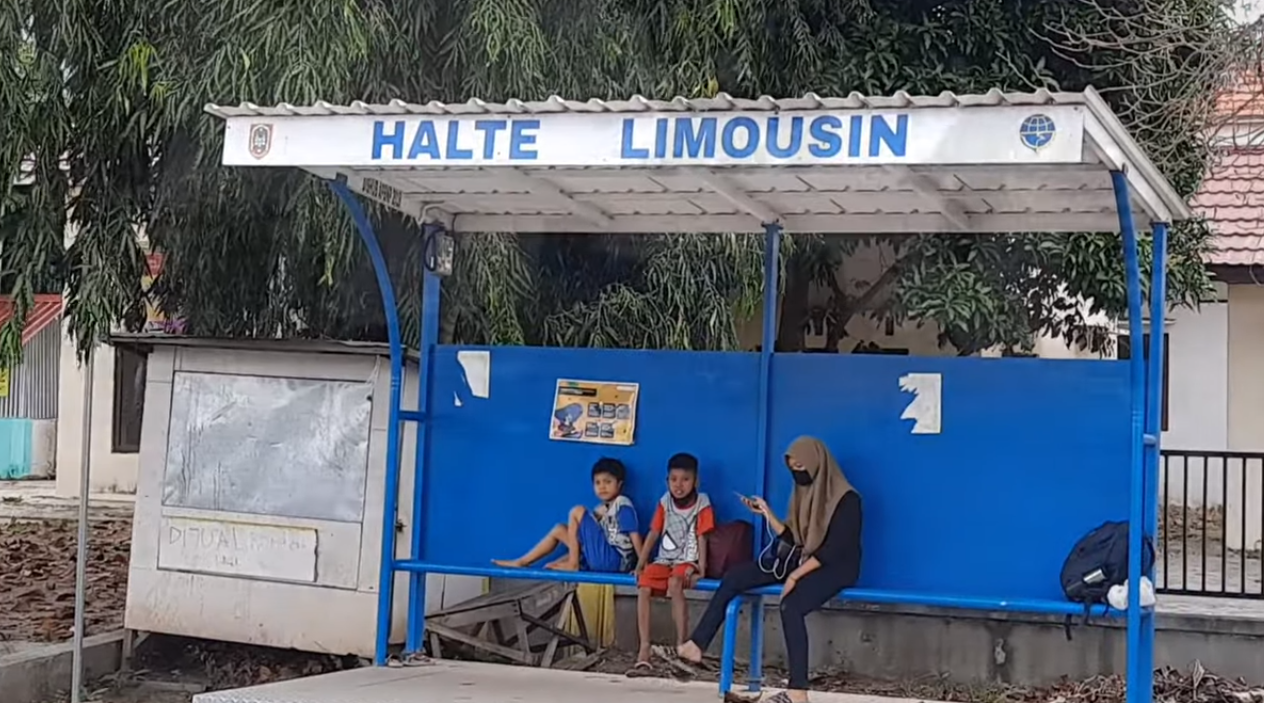
Limousin bus stop in Banjarbaru

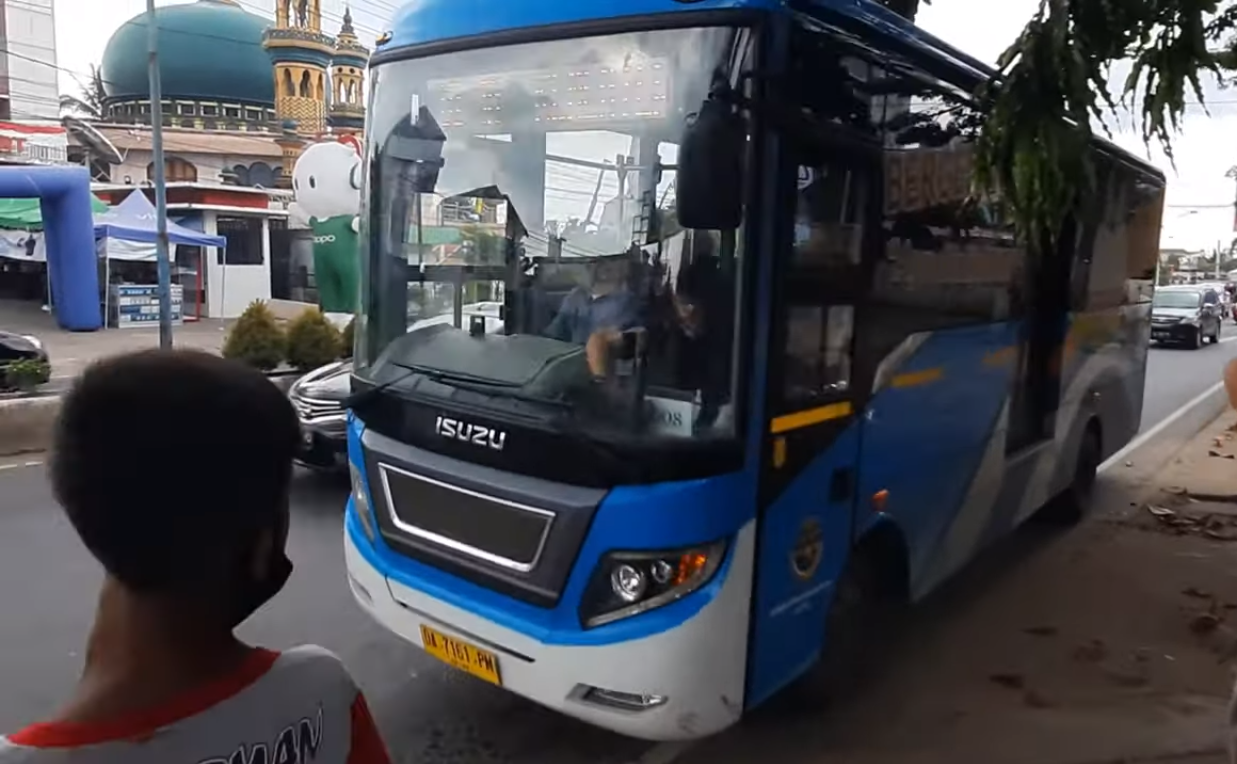
BRT Banjarbakula bus approaching a bus stop
