= South Kalimantan =

Province in Kalimantan, Indonesia

South Kalimantan Kalimantan Selatan
- Province
- Province of South Kalimantan; Provinsi Kalimantan Selatan
- Coat of arms
- Motto: Waja Sampai Kaputing (Banjar) "Strong as Steel Until the End"
- South Kalimantan in Indonesia
- Interactive map of South Kalimantan
- Coordinates: 2°30′S 115°30′E
- Country: Indonesia
- Region: Kalimantan (Western Indonesia)
- Established: 14 August 1950
- Capital: Banjarbaru; 03°26′33″S 114°49′57″E
- Largest city: Banjarmasin; 3°20′S 114°35′E

Government
  - Body: South Kalimantan Provincial Government
  - Governor: Muhidin (PAN)
  - Vice Governor: Hasnuryadi Sulaiman
  - Legislature: South Kalimantan Regional House of Representatives (DPRD)

Area
  - Total: 37,125.43 km^{2} (14,334.21 sq mi)
  - Rank: 19th in Indonesia
- Highest elevation (Gunung Besar): 1,901 m (6,237 ft)

Population (mid 2025 estimate)
  - Total: 4,323,330
  - Density: 116.452/km^{2} (301.609/sq mi)

Demographics
  - Ethnic groups (2010): 76% Banjarese; 13% Javanese; 11% other (Buginese, Dayak, Madurese, Malays, Chinese etc)
  - Religion (2023): 97.02% Islam: 1.90% Christianity; 1.34% Protestantism; 0.56% Catholicism; 0.57% Hinduism; 0.28% Buddhism; 0.22% Aliran Kepercayaan
  - Languages: Indonesian (official); Banjarese (native); Dayak; Bugis
- Time zone: UTC+8 (WITA)
- ISO 3166 code: ID-KS
- GDP (nominal): 2022
- Total: Rp 251.3 trillion (18th); US$ 16.9 billion Int$ 52.8 billion (PPP)
- Per capita: Rp 60.1 million (16th); US$ 4,046; Int$ 12,626 (PPP)
- Growth: ▲5.11%
- HDI (2024): ▲0.752 (13th) – high
- Website: kalselprov.go.id

South Kalimantan (Indonesian: Kalimantan Selatan, Jawi: کالیمانتان سلاتن) is a province of Indonesia. The provincial capital was Banjarmasin until 15 February 2022, where the capital was moved 35 km southeast to Banjarbaru. With an area of 37,125.43 km², it is the smallest province on the island of Kalimantan by land area but the second most populous, after West Kalimantan. The population of South Kalimantan was recorded at just over 3.625 million people at the 2010 Census, and at 4.07 million at the 2020 Census. The official estimate as at mid 2025 was 4,323,330.

One of the five Indonesian provinces in Kalimantan, it is bordered by the Makassar Strait in the east, Central Kalimantan in the west and north, the Java Sea in the south, and East Kalimantan in the northeast. The province also includes the island of Pulau Laut ("Sea Island"), located off the eastern coast of Kalimantan, as well as other smaller offshore islands. The province is divided into 11 regencies and 2 cities. South Kalimantan is the traditional homeland of the Banjar people, although some parts of East Kalimantan and Central Kalimantan are also included in this criterion. Nevertheless, South Kalimantan, especially the former capital city Banjarmasin has always been the cultural capital of Banjarese culture. Many Banjarese have migrated to other parts of Indonesia, as well as neighbouring countries such as Singapore and Malaysia. In addition, other ethnic groups also inhabit the province, such as several groups of the Dayaks, who mostly live in the interior part of the province, as well as the Javanese, who mostly migrated from Java due to the Transmigration program which dated from the Dutch colonial era.

The territory of what is now South Kalimantan alternated between local kingdoms owing to its strategic location for trade, before becoming a tributary of the Sultanate of Mataram in the 17th century. With increasing Dutch encroachment, the territory was colonized as part of the Dutch East Indies and then the Japanese Empire until Indonesian Independence in 1945.

== History ==
=== Etymology ===
South Kalimantan is known as the Land of Lambung Mangkurat (Indonesian: Bumi Lambung Mangkurat). Lambung Mangkurat, which is the Banjarese pronunciation for Lambu (Lembu) Mangkurat, was the second king of the Kingdom of Dipa (the forerunner of the Banjar Sultanate). Lambung Mangkurat replaces his father Ampu Jatmaka or Mpu / Empu Jatmika ang Maharaja in Candi, a wealthy immigrant merchant from the land of Keling, Kediri who was the founder of the kingdom of Dipa around the beginning of the 14th century or around 1380 or 1387.

=== Pre-Sultanate era ===
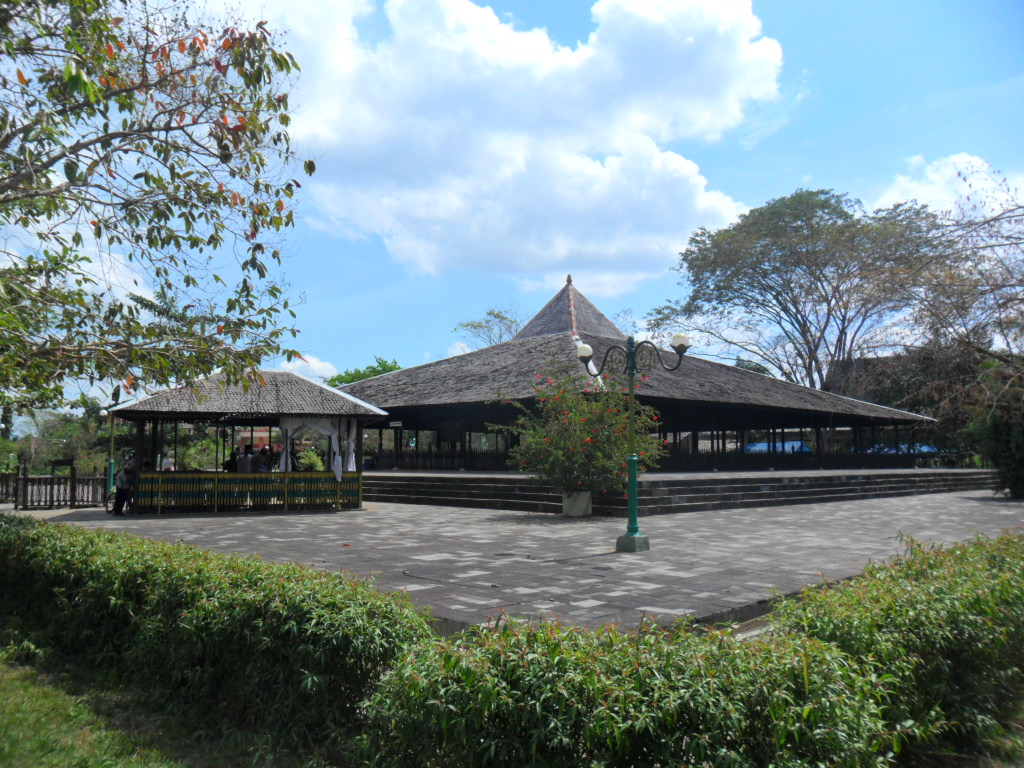
Candi Agung complex in Amuntai

According to the mythology of the Maanyan people (the oldest ethnic group in South Kalimantan), the first kingdom in southern Kalimantan was the Nan Sarunai Kingdom which was estimated to have territory ranging from Tabalong to Paser. The Maanyan mythology tells of the golden age of the Nan Sarunai Kingdom, uniting the Maanyan people and made connections with the island of Madagascar off the coast of Africa. One of the archaeological remains from this era is the Great Temple located in the town of Amuntai. In 1996, C-14 testing of charcoal samples from the Agung Temple dated the structure between 242 and 226 BC. Judging from the number of years referred, the Kingdom of Nan Saruna was 600 years older than the Kutai Martapura Kingdom in East Kalimantan. According to Hikayat Sang Bima, the people who brought descended into the kings of Banjar were the gods that also descended into the kings of Bima, Bali, Dompu and Gowa who is the five sons of Maharaja Pandu Dewata.

The Malagasy language in Madagascar is similar to the Banjar language. Francois-Xavier Ricaut has shown that the Malagasy people's genetic makeup is 68 percent of Africans and 32 percent of Asians. Based on their evidence, Banjar is the Asian group that is most likely to have traveled to Madagascar. Genetic dating supports the hypothesis that Austronesian migration occurred about 1,000 years ago, while the last significant Bantu migration to Madagascar began 300 years later, after climatic change in Africa. Language shifts are thought to have occurred in Southeast Kalimantan after the Banjar migration to Madagascar. It is estimated that the Banjar people, who currently speak Malay, may speak a language closer to the language reconstructed for Proto-Malagasy. This linguistic change follow the main cultural and genetic mix with Malays, driven by the trade post of the Malay Empires in Southeast Kalimantan. The collapse of the Malay Empires during the 15th and 16th centuries coincide with the end of the mixture of Malay genes into the Banjar population. Genetically, ancient Banjar tribes has a mixture of ancient Malay Dayak and Maanyan ancestry. The Banjar tribes, which had dominant Malay genetics, migrated out of Borneo around 830 AD or 1,200 years ago to what is now known as Madagascar.

The Nan Sarunai kingdom was invaded by the Majapahit multiple times, with the third and last invasion under the reign of Hayam Wuruk in 1355. At the time Nan Sarunai was led by Raden Anyan or Datu Tatuyan Wulau Miharaja Papangkat Amas. This invasion was led by Ampu Jatmika with his entourage which according to Hikayat Banjar included his advisor Aria Megatsari, general Tumenggung Tatah Jiwa, minister Wiramartas, punokawan Patih Baras, Patih Basi, Patih Luhu, dan Patih Dulu, and bodyguards Sang Panimba Segara, Sang Pembelah Batung, Sang Jampang Sasak, and Sang Pengeruntung 'Garuntung' Manau. Multiple battles happened with the first battle in April 1358; killed Majapahit soldiers were burned in Tambak Wasi. Nansarunai admiral Jamuhala was also killed in this battle. While prince Jarang and prince Idong hid in Man near the Tabalong-kiwa river. Nansarunai soldiers regrouped in Pulau Kadap before the second battle occurred in December 1362. Casualties from this second battle were buried in Tambak in Bayu Hinrang. In this battle Raden Anyan was killed, speared by Mpu Nala, and buried in Banua Lawas. In its place, Ampu Jatmika founded a Hindu kingdom, Negara Dipa under Majapahit tributary, predecessor of Negara Daha and Banjar Sultanate. Its remnants include Candi Agung complex of Amuntai constructed by Ampu Jatmika on an older Ma'anyan site. While surviving Javanese, Dayak, Madurese, and Bugis soldiers, sailors, metalsmiths of the war settled in Amuntai, Alabio, and Nagara. These invasions were recorded in Dayak Ma'anyan poetry as Nansarunai Usak Jawa.

Maharaja Sukarama, the King of Negara Daha, had the intention that his successor would be his grandson Raden Samudera, son of his daughter Puteri Galuh Intan Sari. The father of Raden Samudera was Raden Manteri Jaya, son of Raden Begawan, brother of Maharaja Sukarama. The will caused Raden Samudera to be threatened with safety because the sons of Maharaja Sukarama were ambitious as kings, namely Prince Bagalung, Prince Mangkubumi and Prince Tumenggung. Assisted by Arya Taranggana, Raden Samudra fled by boat to the lower Barito river. After Sukarama's death, Prince Mangkubumi became King of the Negara Daha, then succeeded by Prince Tumenggung who was also a son of Sukarama. Raden Samudra.

Pangeran Tumenggung attacked the Bandarmasih. Prince Samudra was assisted by the Kingdom of Demak with the strength of 40,000 soldiers with a fleet of 1,000 boats each carrying 400 soldiers capable of withstanding the attack. Prince Tumenggung was willing to give up the power of the Negara Daha to Raden Samudra. Negara Daha was later merged into the Sultanate of Banjar which held a place in Bandarmasih, while Prince Tumenggung was given an area in Batang Alai.

In 1521, Raden Samudra became the first king of the Sultanate of Banjar with the title Sultan Suriansyah. He also became the first king to convert to Islam, guided by the Islamic cleric Khatib Dayan.

=== Sultanate era ===
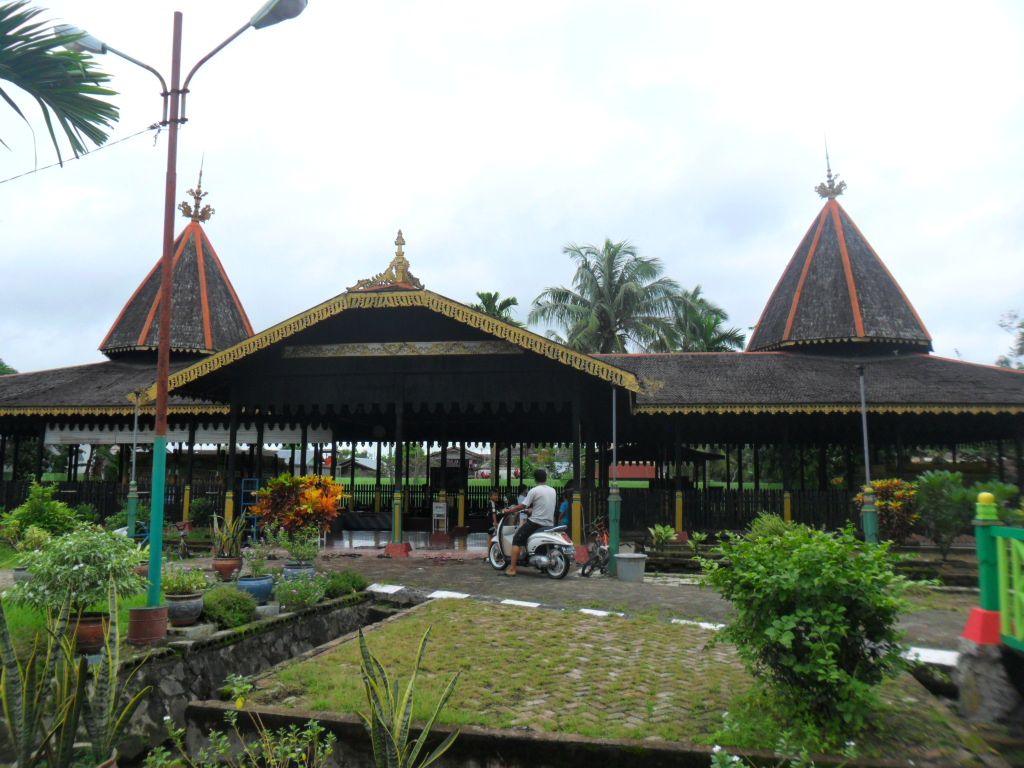
Sultan Suriansyah tomb complex in Banjarmasin

The Banjar Sultanate began experiencing its golden age in the first decade of the 17th century with pepper as a commodity of trade, with the southwest, southeast and east of the island of Borneo paying tribute to the Sultanate. Previously, the Banjar Sultanate paid tribute to the Demak Sultanate, but after the fall of the Demak Sultanate and the rise of the Pajang Sultanate, the Banjar Sultanate no longer sent tribute to Java.

The supremacy of Java against Banjarmasin, was carried out again by Tuban in 1615 to conquer Banjarmasin with the help of Madura (Arosbaya) and Surabaya, but failed due to fierce resistance.

Sultan Agung of Mataram, developed his power over the island of Java by defeating the port city of the northern coast of Java such as Jepara and Gresik (1610), Tuban (1619), Madura (1624) and Surabaya (1625). In 1622, the Mataram Sultanate, again planned an occupation of the kingdoms south, southwest and southeast of the island of Borneo, and Sultan Agung consolidated his authority over the Kingdom of Sukadana in 1622.

In 1636, because he felt he had enough strength in the military and economy to deal with an invasion from other kingdoms, The Sultan of Banjar claimed Sambas, Lawai, Sukadana, Kotawaringin, Pembuang, Sampit, Mendawai, Kahayan Hilir and Kahayan Hulu, Kutai, Pasir, Pulau Laut, Satui, Asam Asam, Kintap and Swarangan as vassals of the Sultanate of Banjarmasin.

Since 1631, Banjarmasin was preparing to face an attack from the Mataram Sultanate, but due to lack of logistics, the planned attack from the Mataram Sultanate never materialised. After 1637 there was a massive migration from Java by the victims of Sultan Agung's political aggression. The arrival of immigrants from Java had a huge influence with the ports on the island of Borneo becoming the center of diffusion of Javanese culture.

Besides facing an invasion plan from Mataram, the Sultanate of Banjarmasin also had to face the increasing Dutch presence in the region. In 1637 Banjarmasin and Mataram held peace conference after years of tense relations. The Makassar War (1660–1669) caused many traders to move from Somba Opu, then under the rule of the Gowa Sultanate to Banjarmasin. The currency circulating in the Sultanate of Banjar was called doit.

Before it was divided into several small kingdoms, the Banjar Sultanate included the modern-day provinces of South Kalimantan and Central Kalimantan, to the west it bordered the Kingdom of Tanjungpura at Ketapang and to the east by the Paser Sultanate at Tanjung Aru. In the area, the local rules had the title Prince, only the Sultan of Banjar has the right to use the title Sultan. Other sultanates sent tribute to the Sultanate of Banjar, including the Paser Sultanate which was conquered in 1636 with the help of the Dutch.

Initially, the capital of the Banjar Sultanate was in Banjarmasin, but it was moved to Martapura. at its height, the area under the influence of the Banjar Sultanate encompassed the central point of the king's palace in Martapura and ended at the outer point at present-day Sambas Regency in West Kalimantan in the northwest to the Karasikan region (present-day Sulu Archipelago) in the northeast. The Sambas and Karasikan Kingdoms sent tribute to the Sultan of Banjar. In the Hikayat Banjar also mentioned countries in Batang Lawai, Sukadana, Bunyut (Kutai Hulu) and Sewa Agung (Sawakung).

=== Colonial era ===
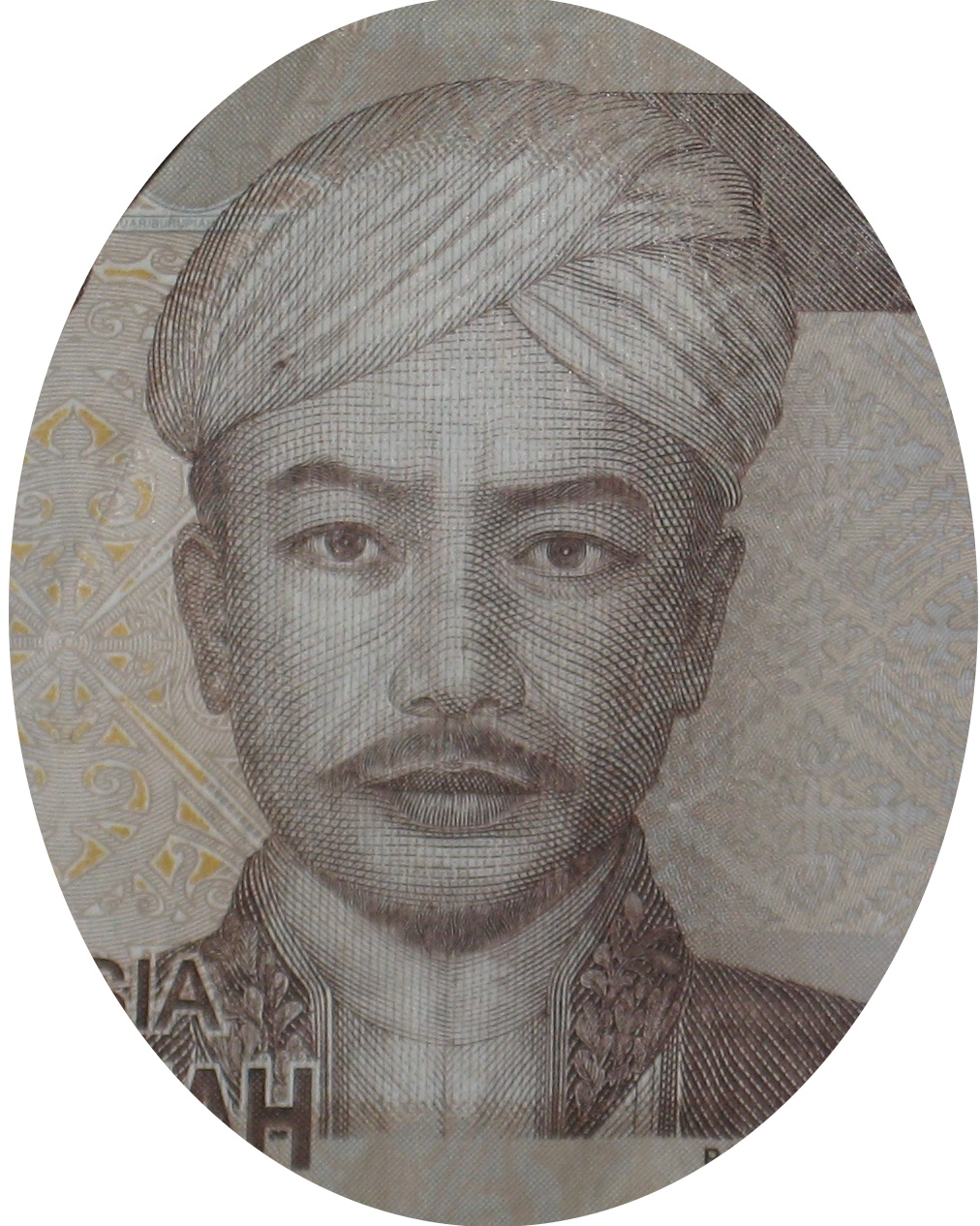
Pangeran Antasari lead the Banjarese resistance against the Dutch during the Banjarmasin War

In the 18th century, Prince Tamjidullah I succeeded in gaining power to his dynasty and designated Prince Nata Dilaga as the first Sultan as Panembahan Kaharudin Khalilullah. Prince Nata Dilaga who became the first king of the Tamjidullah dynasty, declared himself as Susuhunan Nata Alam in 1772. The son of Sultan Muhammad Aliuddin Aminullah, Prince Amir, the grandson of Sultan Hamidullah fled to the Paser Kingdom, and requested assistance from his uncle, Arung Tarawe (and Queen Goddess). Prince Amir then returned and invaded the Banjar Sultanate with a large Buginese army in 1757, and tried to reclaim his throne from Susuhunan Nata Alam. Fearing the loss of the throne and the fall of the kingdom under the Bugis, Susuhunan Nata Alam requested assistance from the Dutch East India Company (VOC).

The VOC accepted the request and sent Captain Hoffman with his forces and succeeded in defeating the Buginese forces. Prince Amir was forced to flee back to the Paser Kingdom. Some time later Prince Amir tried to ask for assistance from the Banjar nobles in the Barito area who were not happy with the Dutch presence. In this second battle, Prince Amir was captured and was exiled to Ceylon in 1787. After that an agreement was made between the Sultanate of Banjar and the VOC, where the kings of the Banjar ruled the kingdom as borrowers of VOC land. In 1826 a re-agreement was held between the Dutch East Indies Government and Sultan Adam, based on the previous agreement. According to the new agreement, the Dutch were allowed to interfere with the appointment of the Crown Prince and the Mangkubumi, which resulted in the destruction of this royal custom, which was one of the causes of the Banjarmasin War.

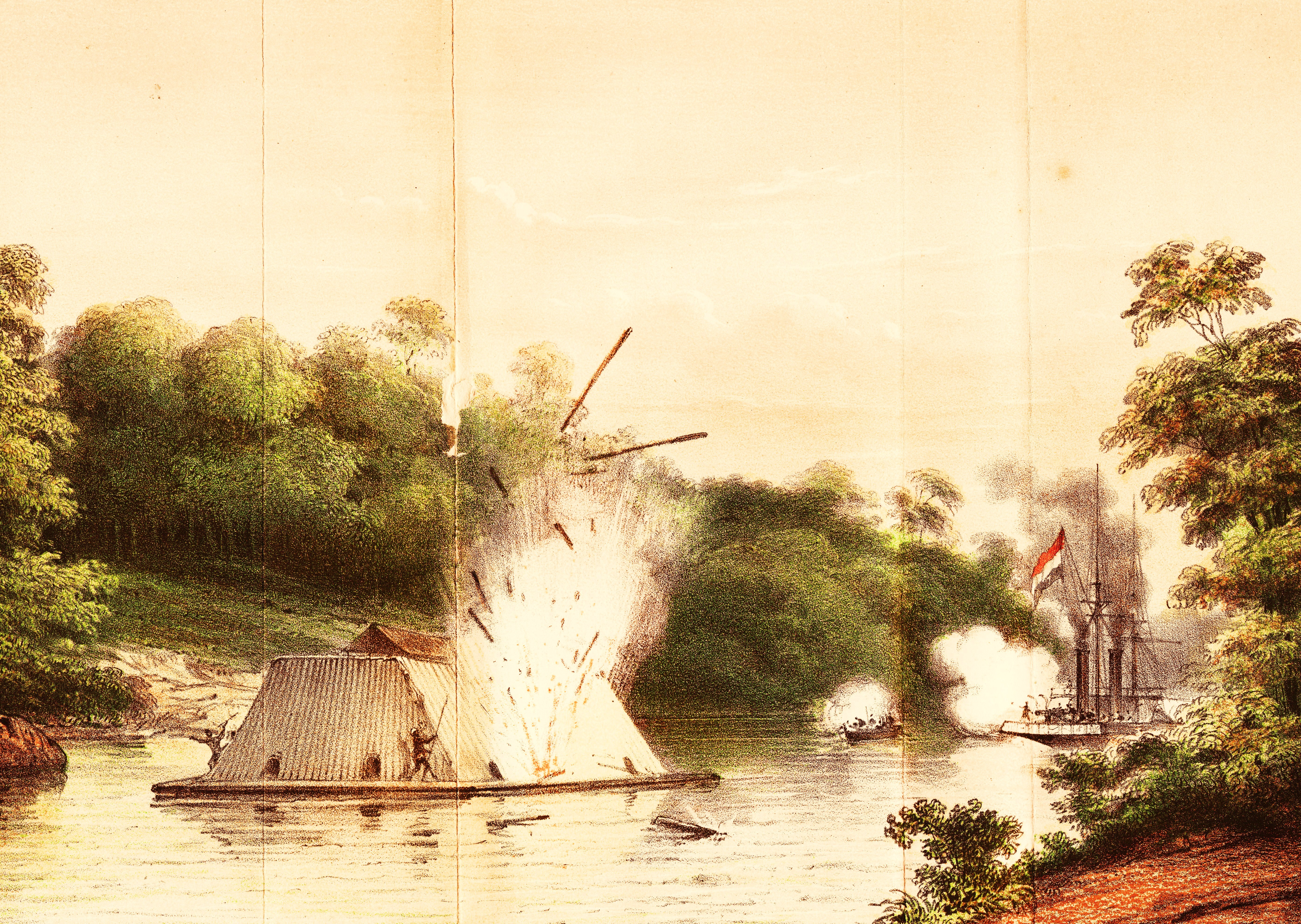
The steamship Celebes fighting with armed Dayak vessels

The Banjarmasin War took place between 1859 and 1905 (1859–1863 according to Dutch sources). Sultan Hidayatullah II of Banjar and Prince Antasari used a strategy of guerrilla warfare by moving the government to the interior and building fortifications in the Borneon jungles. The resistance established unity between the Banjar and the Dayak people, tied to kinship through marriage ties. The association gave birth to the status of pegustian and temenggung which became a unifying tool for the Banjar-Dayak coalition facing the Dutch.

Pangeran Antasari also collaborated with the Kutai Kertanegara Sultanate through his relatives in Tenggarong. Pangeran Antasari wrote to other princes from Kutai such as Prince Nata Kusuma, Pangeran Anom, and Kerta. They all assisted the smuggling of firearms from Kutai to Hamlet (Banjar). However, when the Banjar War was continued by the descendants of Pangeran Antasari, The Sultan of Kutai Aji Muhammad Sulaiman did not respond positively to requests for help from Prince Perbatasari. In fact, Prince Perbatasari was handed over to the Dutch in 1885. The Dutch launched the "Expedition to the Southern and Eastern region of Borneo" (Dutch: Expeditie naar de Zuider- en Oosterafdeling van Borneo), resulting in the destruction of the Banjar Sultanate. Resistance towards the Dutch continued until 1905, when Dutch forces under the leadership of Lieutenant Christoffel, a veteran of the Aceh War, with three brigades of 60 men of Korps Marechaussee te voet troops, attacked Manawing fortress in January 1905. The Korps Marechaussee te voet was a very mobile corps of the KNIL colonial army established by the Dutch East Indies Government in 1890 to counter guerilla tactics. Massively outnumbered, Sultan Muhammad Seman did not survive the battle, as he was shot and killed on 24 January 1905.

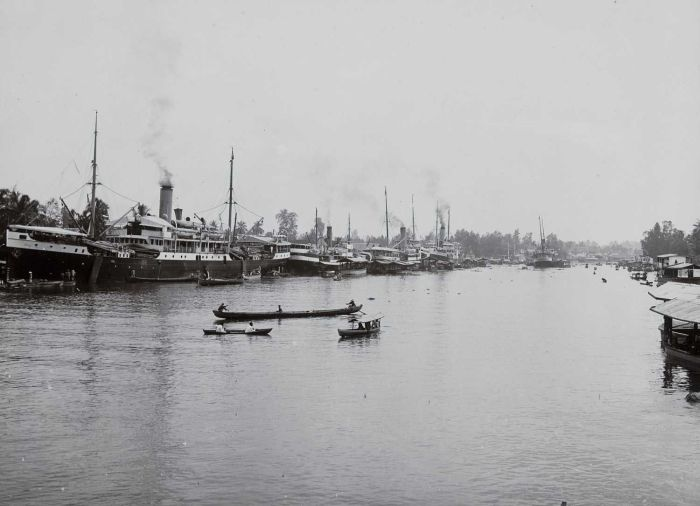
Boats lining up on the Martapura River

The Dutch annexed and placed the former territory of the Banjar Sultanate under the jurisdiction of the Residency of South and Eastern Borneo (Dutch: Residentie Zuider en Oosterafdeeling van Borneo). In 1938, the Residency of Western Borneo (Dutch: Residentie Westerafdeeling van Borneo) and the Residency of South and Eastern Borneo were merged into the Government of Borneo (Dutch: Gouvernement of Borneo) with Bandjermasin as its capital (Dutch: stadsgemeente).

=== Japanese invasion and occupation ===
During the Dutch East Indies campaign of World War II, the Japanese invaded Borneo. Immediately after capturing Balikpapan on 26 January 1942, the 56th Mixed Infantry Group was ordered to complete the occupation of Dutch Borneo by invading Bandjermasin, its capital. During the Battle of Balikpapan and also after the occupation of the city, efforts were made to gather information from Japanese residents, natives and prisoners of war. Reconnaissance flights in the area were carried out by naval air units. It was necessary to capture Bandjermasin, as soon as possible, to secure its airfield for combat aircraft scheduled to participate in the Java Operation.

A Sea Drive Unit under command of Captain Yoshibumi Okamoto left Balikpapan on the evening of 27 January 1942, three days ahead of the main Land Drive Unit. The craft moved only at night and were carefully concealed in the river banks during daylight and camouflaged with mangrove branches, while the troops were resting in the forest, so that they were completely hidden from aerial reconnaissance planes. Radio silence was maintained all the time. One naval officer was attached to the unit as a pilot. The surprise night attack was successfully carried out on the town of Kotabaroe on Laoet Island, as planned. Very little resistance was encountered and a large quantity of military supplies and provisions was captured.

The local administrative governor was unhappy with his territorial commander and asked the main Royal Netherlands East Indies Army (KNIL) HQ on Java for a replacement. The replacement commander was on his way by airplane, but returned as they saw Bandjarmasin was on fire and they thought, although wrongly, that it was already occupied by Japanese troops and perhaps it would be unwise to attempt a landing. The Okamoto's unit landed at a point approximately 80 km southeast of Bandjarmasin on 8 February 1942, and advanced overland without opposition, to the airfield. As the Land Drive Unit had already dispersed the enemy, there was no fighting after the Sea Drive Unit reached the Martapoera airfield on 10 February 1942.

At 0900 on 10 February, the Martapoera airfield was captured by the Advance Force together with the Engineer Company. By the evening of 10 February, with the arrival of the main force and the Sea Land Unit, Bandjermasin was finally occupied. There was no fighting.

Lieutenant Colonel H. T. Halkema came by sea to the Barito River, with his staff, accompanied by elements of units under his command. By now many KNIL native soldiers had already deserted. Lieutenant Colonel Halkema received orders to proceed to Kotawarangin airfield. When he arrived there, with only 75 men left under his depleted command, he received an order to have part of his shrunken force, to staunchly defend the airfield, while those that were too weak and exhausted should to be sent to Java. Lieutenant Colonel Halkema was later court-marshalled by the military court (Hoog Militair Gerechtshof). In the meantime a brave group of civilians, and military escapees, 180 persons, managed to evade the Japanese aboard a small coaster to Madoera Island, among which also included 20 women.

The official Japanese casualties during the Bandjermasin operation numbered only 9 soldiers who were killed or died from various diseases, while at least 80% of the men infected with malaria. The casualties and the number of POWs on the Dutch side are unknown. The distance travelled by land routes was approximately 400 km and the distance through jungle approximately 100 km.

During the Japanese occupation, Borneo and eastern Indonesia were controlled by the 2nd South Fleet of the Imperial Japanese Navy. During the occupation, the Japanese committed brutal war crimes against the local population, resulting in thousands of casualties. All of people's lives were closely monitored by the Kempetai. Towards the end of Japanese rule, many romusha in the form of skeletal clad in full leather, young girls from Java and South Kalimantan themselves were made jugun ianfu (comfort women).

In 1943, a scheme by Indonesian nationalists and Dutch in South Kalimantan against the Japanese was uncovered before the Pontianak incident occurred. According to some sources this happened in September 1943 at Amuntai in South Kalimantan and involved establishing up an Islamic State and expelling the Japanese but the plan was foiled.

=== Revolution and modern era ===
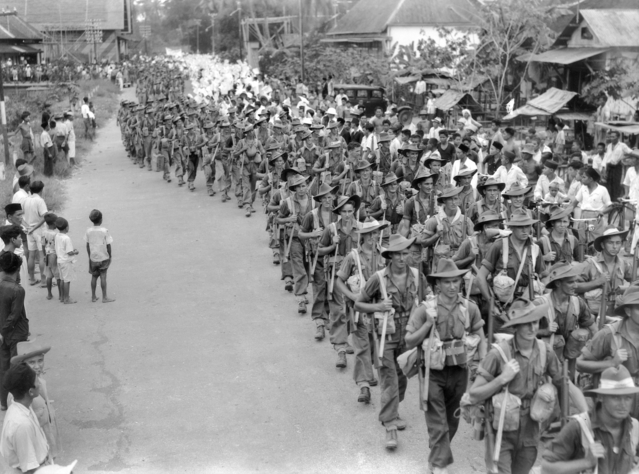
Soldiers of the Australian 2/31st Battalion passing through the town of Bandjermasin in Borneo as they took responsibility for the area from the Japanese. They are being given an enthusiastic welcome by local civilians.

On September 17, 1945, Japan surrendered to the Australian Army who entered Banjarmasin. On 1 July 1946, the Australian handed control back to the Dutch colonial government. Governor-General Hubertus van Mook draw up a plan for a federal government through the Malino Conference (16-22 July 1946) and the Denpasar Conference (7-24 December 1946) decided on the formation of four federal states, Java, Sumatra, Borneo (Netherlands Borneo) and the Great East (State of East Indonesia). The formation of the Borneo state was opposed by the people of Banjarmasin, led by several figure such as Hasan Basry.

The Dutch remained in South Kalimantan until 1949, when the Dutch–Indonesian Round Table Conference resulted in the Dutch recognizing Indonesia's sovereignty. The Dutch then withdraw from the region, ending the three-century long Dutch presence in the region. The region was initially incorporated into the Indonesian province of Kalimantan, but in 1956 the province was dissolved and separated into three provinces - East Kalimantan, West Kalimantan and South Kalimantan. In 1957 South Kalimantan was divided to provide the Dayak population with greater autonomy from the Muslim population in the province. The change was approved by the Indonesian Government on 23 May 1957, under Presidential Law No. 10 Year 1957, which declared Central Kalimantan the seventeenth province of Indonesia.

== Geography ==
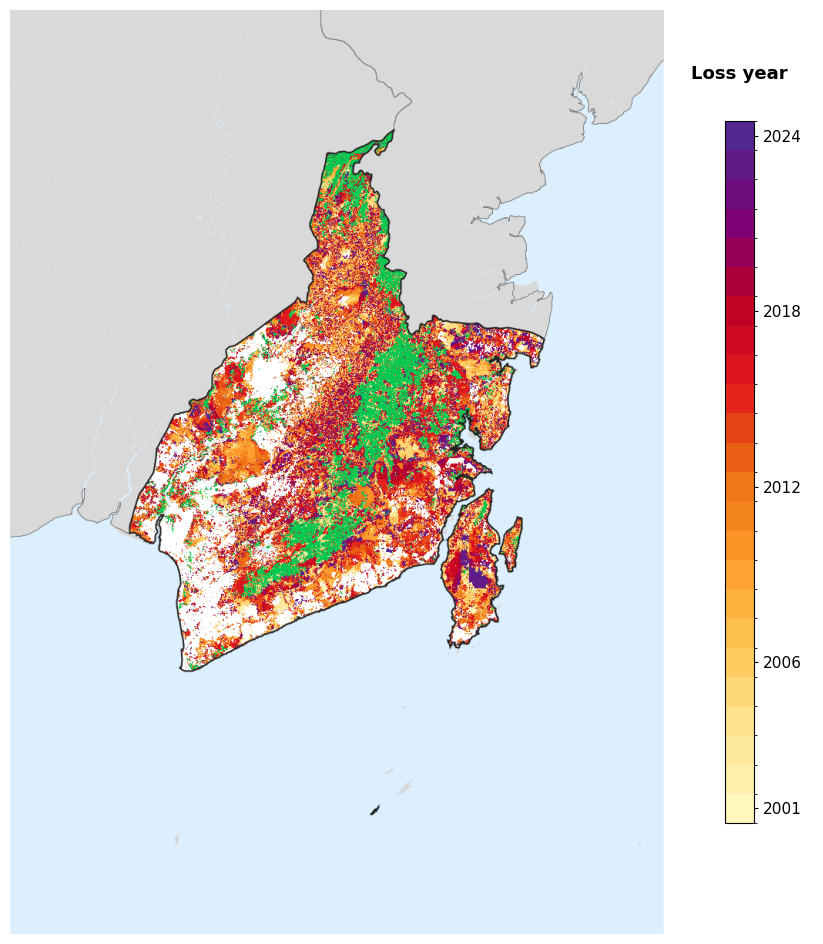
Tree-cover loss year in South Kalimantan, 2001-2024, from the Global Forest Change dataset.

South Kalimantan is a province located on the island of Borneo, located between longitude 21 21 49 "LS, 114 19" 33 "BT – 116 33 '28 BT, and 21' 49" LS 110 "14" LS on the map. South Kalimantan has a total land area of 37,125.43 km^{2} and is divided into eleven regencies (kabupaten) and two independent cities (kota).

Geographically, South Kalimantan is in the southeastern part of the island of Borneo, has a low-lying area in the west and east coast, and a plateau formed by the Meratus Mountains in the middle. South Kalimantan consists of two main geographic features, namely the lowlands and the highlands. Lowland areas are mostly in the form of peatlands to swamps, which are rich in biodiversity sources of freshwater animals. Some highland areas are still natural tropical forests and protected by the government.

South Kalimantan has extensive forests namely Permanent Forests (139,315 ha), Production Forests (1,325,024 ha), Protected Forests (139,315 ha), Convention Forests (348,919 ha). Forestry consists of two types, namely wood and non-wood. The area of forest in South Kalimantan is 1,659,003 ha including; protected forests, natural forests, permanent production forests, limited production forests, conversion forests and mangrove forests. Some are tropical forests and protected by the government.

South Kalimantan is known as "the land of a thousand rivers", due to the large number of rivers in South Kalimantan. Among these rivers, one of the best-known is the Barito River, whose name is based on the Barito region (formerly Onder Afdeeling Barito) - a drainage basin whose upstream area includes much of Central Kalimantan Province, but in the lower part of the watershed to its mouth at the Java Sea in South Kalimantan is called Muara Banjar/Kuala Banjar. The Barito River is commonly used for buying and selling at floating markets. In addition, there is also the Martapura River, a tributary of the Barito which it joins at Banjarmasin; further east, the Martapura River passes through the town of Martapura and the city of Banjarbaru, the capital of Banjar Regency.

=== Climate ===
This region has a tropical savanna climate, similar to most other Indonesian provinces. The season in West Sumatra is similar to other regions in Indonesia, only known for two seasons, namely the dry season and the rainy season. From June to September wind flows from Australia and do not contain much water vapor, resulting in a dry season. Conversely in December to March many wind currents contain water vapor from Asia and the Pacific Oceanduring the rainy season. Such conditions occur every half-year after passing the transition period in between April – May and October – November.

Climate data for Banjarmasin
Month	Jan	Feb	Mar	Apr	May	Jun	Jul	Aug	Sep	Oct	Nov	Dec	Year
Mean daily maximum °C (°F)	29 (85)	29 (85)	30 (86)	31 (87)	31 (88)	31 (87)	31 (87)	31 (88)	31 (88)	31 (88)	31 (87)	29 (85)	31 (87)
Mean daily minimum °C (°F)	25 (77)	25 (77)	24 (76)	26 (78)	26 (78)	25 (77)	24 (75)	24 (75)	24 (75)	25 (77)	25 (77)	24 (76)	24 (76)
Average precipitation mm (inches)	350 (13.8)	300 (11.8)	310 (12.2)	210 (8.3)	200 (7.9)	120 (4.7)	120 (4.7)	110 (4.3)	130 (5.1)	120 (4.7)	230 (9.1)	290 (11.4)	2,570 (101.2)
Source: http://www.weatherbase.com/weather/weather.php3?s=58669&refer=&units=metric

As in most other province of Indonesia, South Kalimantan has a tropical rainforest climate (Köppen climate classification Af) bordering on a tropical monsoon climate and tropical savanna climate (Köppen climate classification Aw) along the savanna grassland plains. The climate is very much dictated by the surrounding sea and the prevailing wind system. It has high average temperature and high average rainfall.

== Government ==
The Province of South Kalimantan is led by a governor who is elected directly with his representative for a 5-year term. In addition to being a regional government, the Governor also acts as a representative or extension of the central government in the province, whose authority is regulated in Law No. 32 of 2004 and Government Regulation number 19 of 2010.

While the relationship between the provincial government and the regency and city governments is not a sub-ordinate, each of these regional governments governs and manages government affairs according to the principle of autonomy and co-administration.

=== Administrative Divisions ===
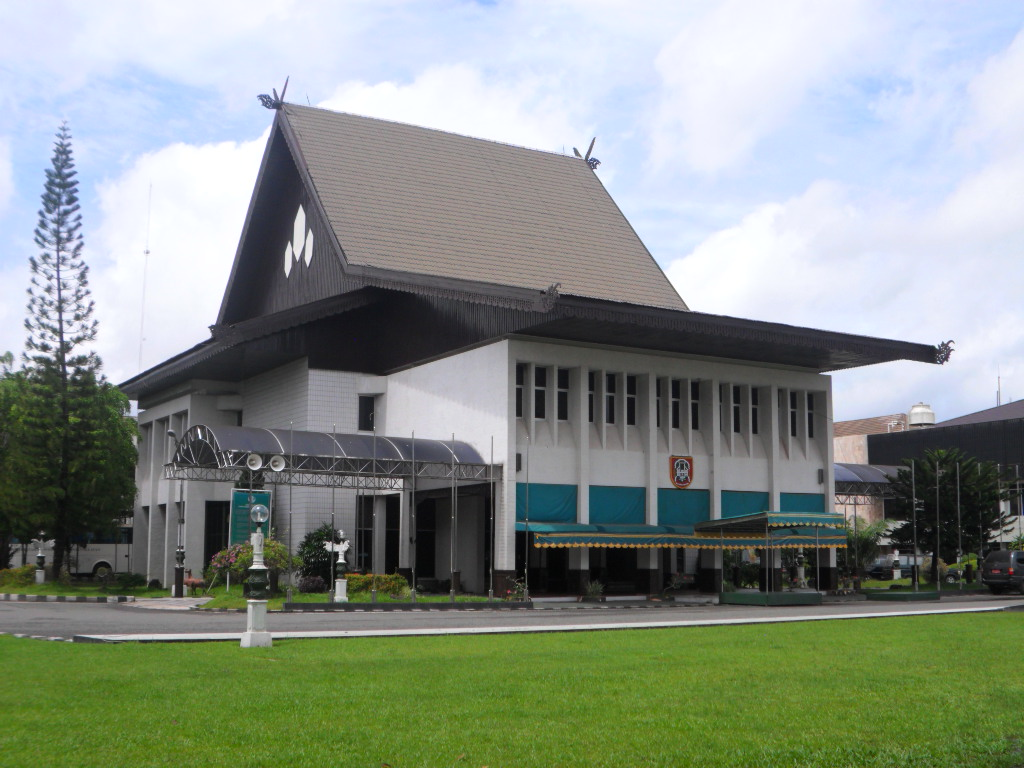
South Kalimantan Governor's office in Banjarmasin

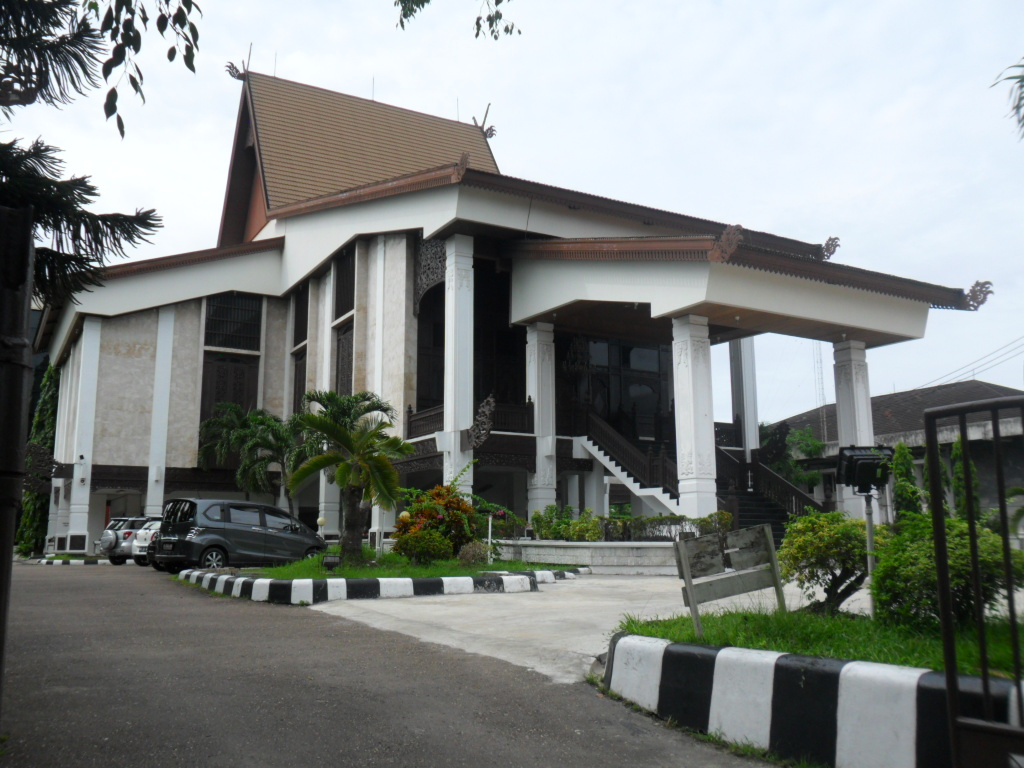
South Kalimantan Regional Representatives Council building in Banjarmasin

From the formation of the Province of South Kalimantan there were seven regencies (kabupaten) - Banjar, Barito, Kapuas, Kotabaru, Kotawaringin, North Hulu Sungai and South Hulu Sungai - together with the independent city of Banjarmasin. On 14 July 1965 three further regencies were created - Tanah Laut from part of Banjar Regency, Tapin from part of South Hulu Sungai Regency, and Tabalong from part of North Hulu Sungai Regency.

A second independent city - Banjarbaru - was created on 20 April 1999, and on 25 February 2003 two additional regencies were created - Tanah Bumbu from part of Kotabaru Regency, and Balangan from part of Hulu Sungai Utara Regency. There are now therefore eleven regencies (kabupaten) and two cities (kota) in South Kalimantan as listed below with their areas and their populations at the 2010 and 2020 Censuses together with the official estimates as at mid 2025 and their administrative capitals.

Kode Wilayah	Name of City or Regency	Area in km^{2}	Pop'n 2010 Census	Pop'n 2020 Census	Pop'n mid 2025 estimate	Capital	HDI 2024 Estimates
63.01	Tanah Laut Regency	3,841.16	296,333	348,966	368,910	Pelaihari	0.734 (High)
63.02	Kotabaru Regency	9,345.91	290,142	325,622	348,250	Kotabaru	0.724 (High)
63.03	Banjar Regency	4,588.37	506,839	565,635	609,640	Martapura	0.744 (High)
63.04	Barito Kuala Regency	2,425.83	276,147	313,021	335,650	Marabahan	0.714 (High)
63.05	Tapin Regency	2,155.94	167,877	189,475	201,200	Rantau	0.740 (High)
63.06	South Hulu Sungai Regency (Hulu Sungai Selatan)	1,697.22	212,485	228,006	241,530	Kandangan	0.739 (High)
63.07	Central Hulu Sungai Regency (Hulu Sungai Tengah)	1,573.54	243,460	258,721	271,230	Barabai	0.733 (High)
63.08	North Hulu Sungai Regency (Hulu Sungai Utara)	907.49	209,246	226,727	239,640	Amuntai	0.717 (High)
63.09	Tabalong Regency	3,473.07	218,620	253,305	270,300	Tanjung	0.759 (High)
63.10	Tanah Bumbu Regency	4,884.86	267,929	322,646	347,260	Batulicin	0.745 (High)
63.11	Balangan Regency	1,828.51	112,430	130,355	140,090	Paringin	0.738 (High)
63.71	Banjarmasin City	98.37	625,481	657,663	670,840	Banjarmasin	0.805 (Very High)
63.72	Banjarbaru City	305.15	199,627	253,442	278,800	Banjarbaru	0.816 (Very High)
	Totals	37,125.43	3,626,616	4,073,584	4,323,330	Banjarbaru	0.751 (High)

The province comprises two of Indonesia's 84 national electoral districts to elect members to the People's Representative Council. The South Kalimantan I Electoral District consists of 8 of the regencies in the province (Banjar, Barito Kuala, Tapin, South Hulu Sungai, Central Hulu Sungai, North Hulu Sungai, Tabalong and Balangan), and elects 6 members to the People's Representative Council. The South Kalimantan II Electoral District consists of the remaining 3 regencies (Tanah Laut, Kota Baru and Tanah Bumbu), together with the cities of Banjarmasin and Banjarbaru, and elects 5 members to the People's Representative Council. Aboe Bakar Al-Habsyi is a representative of South Kalimantan I since 2014 and legislator since 2004 from the PKS fraction.

== Demographics ==
Historical population
Year	Pop.	±%
1961	1,473,155	—
1971	1,699,105	+15.3%
1980	2,064,649	+21.5%
1990	2,597,572	+25.8%
1995	2,893,477	+11.4%
2000	2,985,240	+3.2%
2005	3,281,993	+9.9%
2010	3,626,616	+10.5%
2015	3,984,315	+9.9%
2020	4,073,584	+2.2%
2025	4,323,330	+6.1%
Source: Badan Pusat Statistik 2026 and earlier volumes.

=== Ethnicity ===
The majority of the population of South Kalimantan are the Banjar people (74.34%). They consist of three groups, namely the Banjar Kuala, Banjar Pahuluan and Banjar Batang Banyu. Based on the 2010 population census the Banjar people numbered 4.1 million. About 3 million Banjar people live in South Kalimantan, another million Banjar people live in the other Kalimantan provinces and 500,000 other Banjars live outside Kalimantan. The Banjar people originated from the Banjar area, which is a mix of communities in several river basins, namely those of the Bahan, Barito, Martapura and Tabanio rivers. From this central cultural area, the Banjar tribe has since moved extensively with centrifugal emigration to various regions in the archipelago and to Madagascar.

The second largest ethnic group is the Javanese (14.51%) who occupy the transmigration area. Other ethnic groups also exist in South Kalimantan. The Tionghoa Parit (Banjarese: Cina Parit) is a sub-group of the Chinese Indonesians. They inhabit the Parit river area in Pelaihari District of Tanah Laut Regency, South Kalimantan. In the daily term, the Chinese are called Cina Parit by the Banjar people and it is quite difficult for the Banjar tongue to pronounce Tionghoa Parit, and in fact the Chinese people in Banjarmasin live in the Chinatown area which consists of the Pacinan Laut Village (near the river) and Pacinan Darat Village (from the river). The Chinese community call themselves as Tionghoa Parit instead of Cina Parit.

The Dayak are also original inhabitants of the province. They occupy the Meratus Mountains region, from which the Barito River flows to Central Kalimantan.

=== Language ===
The language used in everyday life by Banjarese as a mother tongue and as a lingua franca for the people of South Kalimantan generally is the Banjar language, which has two major dialects, namely the Banjar Kuala dialect and the Banjar Hulu dialect. Dayak tribes who inhabit the southern region of the Meratus Mountains speak the Dayak Meratus language.

The Dayak Dusmala (Dusun-Maanyan-Lawangan) who use the Eastern Barito languages inhabit the northern region of the Meratus Mountains; these include the Dayak Maanyan Warukin language, the Dayak Samihin language, the Dayak Dusun Deyah language, the Dayak Lawangan language, and the Dayak Abal language. The Dayak Biaju who use the Western Barito languages inhabit the basin of the Barito River; these include numerous languages, among others the Dayak Bakumpai language and the Dayak Barangas language. The Dayak Ngaju language, a language originating from Central Kalimantan is used as a liturgical language in the Borneo Evangelical Church headquartered in Banjarmasin.

Indonesian is widely used as a second language and also for inter-ethnic communication.

=== Religion ===
Religion in South Kalimantan (2022)
religion	percent
Islam	97.03%
Protestantism	1.34%
Hinduism	0.57%
Roman Catholicism	0.55%
Buddhism	0.29%
Others	0.22%

Islam is the majority religion adhered to around 97% of people in South Kalimantan. There was also Christian, Hindu and Buddhist communities as well as the Kaharingan belief embraced by the Dayak people who lived around the Meratus Mountains region.

Religion South Kalimantan

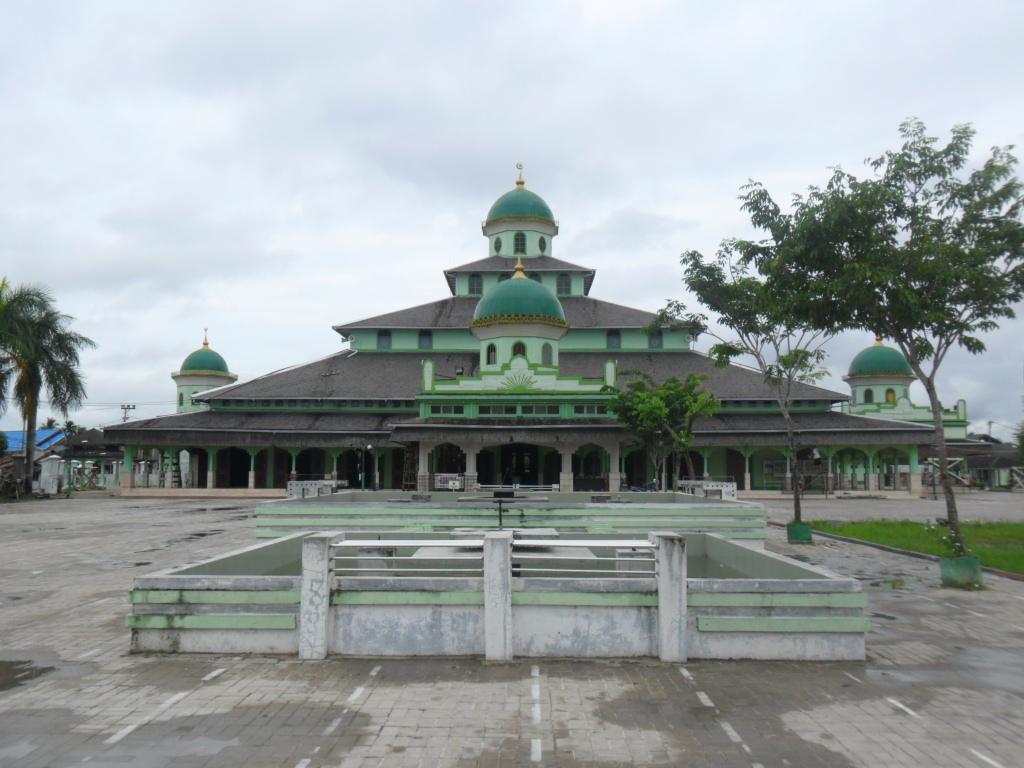
Banjarmasin Great Mosque

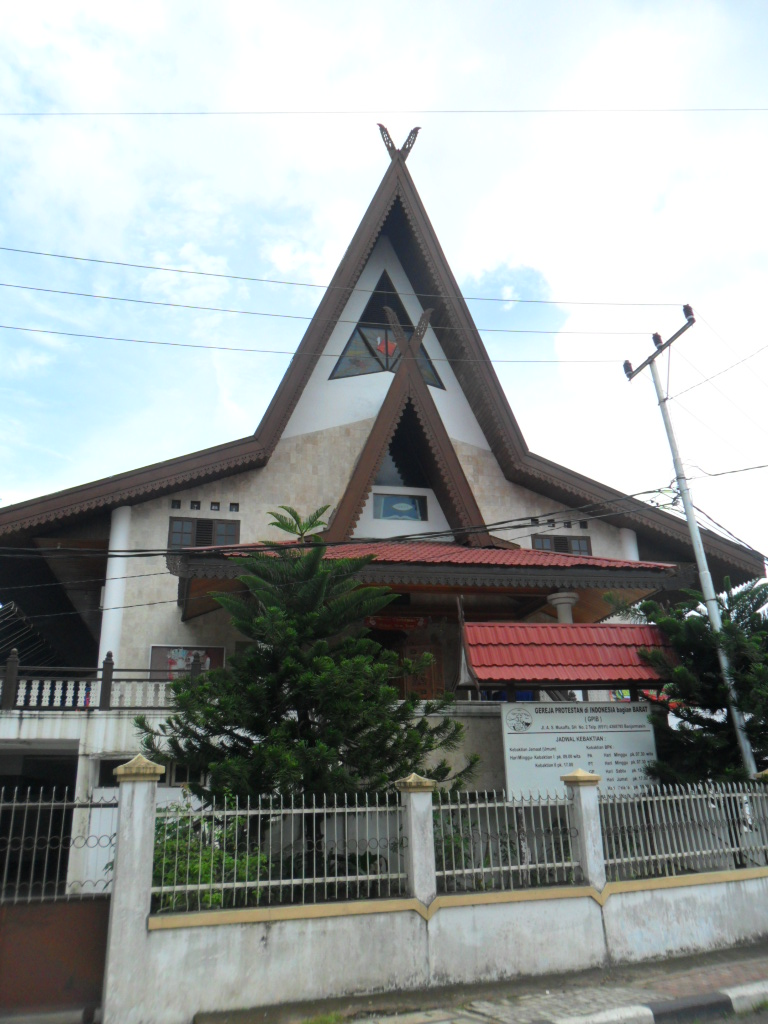
Protestant Church of Western Indonesia in Banjarmasin

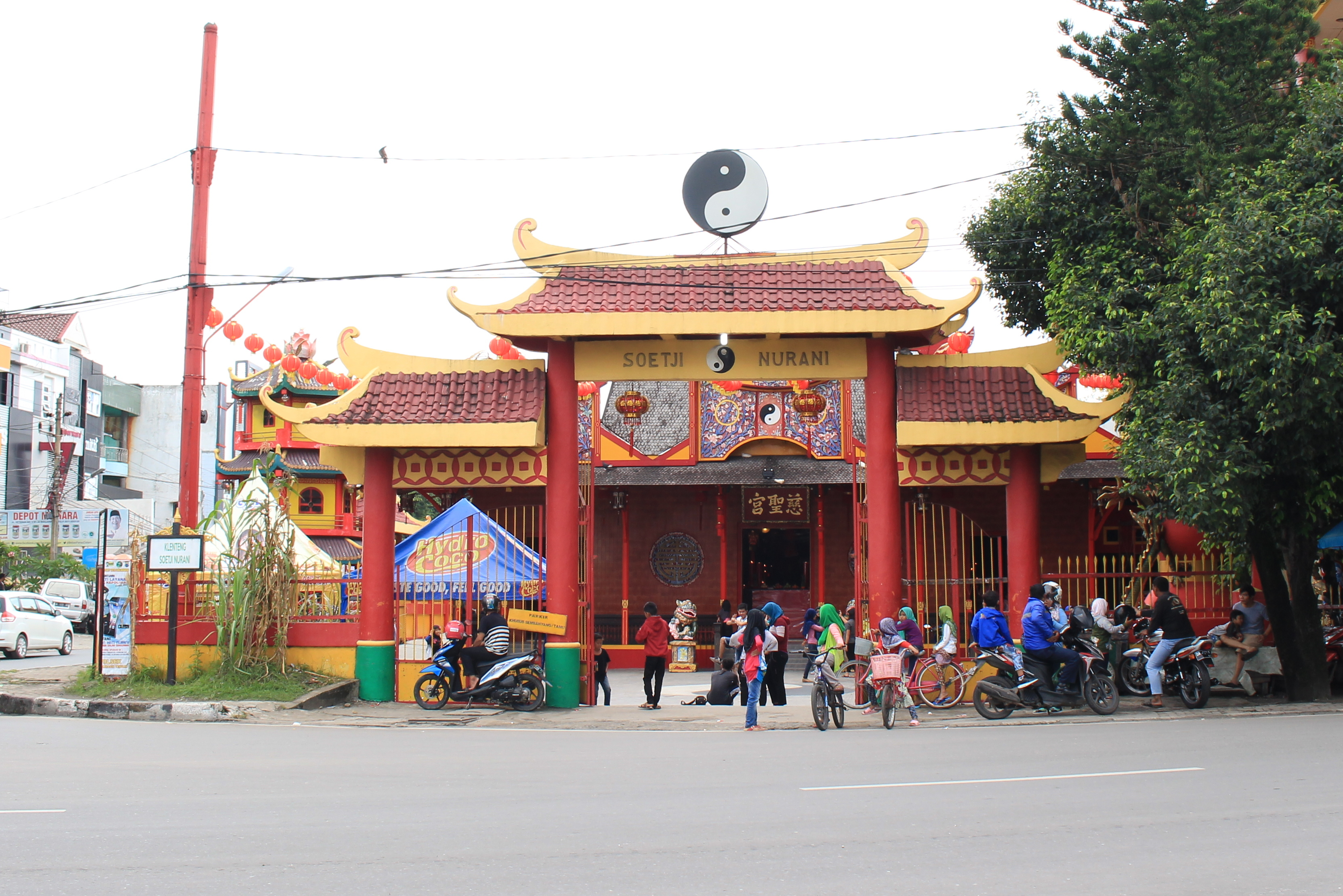
Klenteng Soetji Nurani

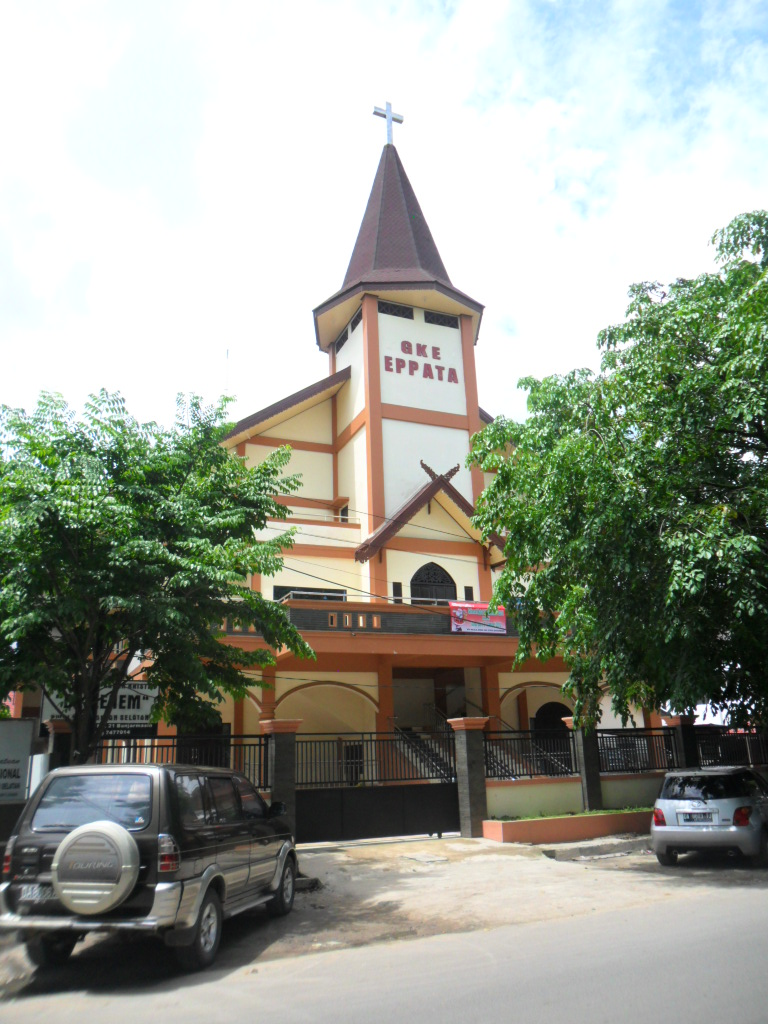
Evangelist Kalimantan Church of Eppata in Banjarmasin

== Culture ==
=== Traditional Music ===
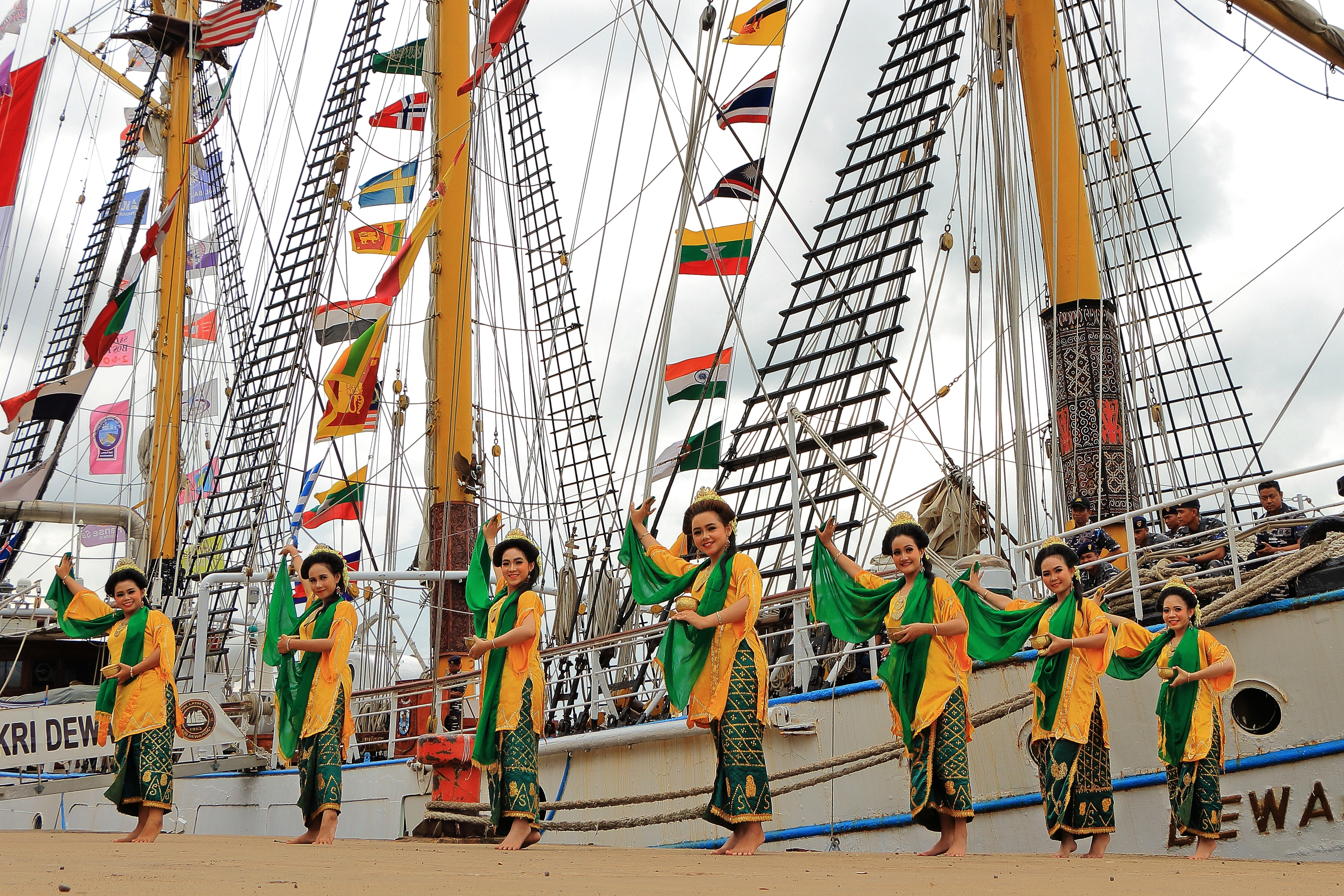
Banjarese women performing Tari Radap Rahayu

One of the arts in the form of traditional music typical of the Banjar people is Panting. This music is called Panting because it is dominated by musical instruments called panting, a type of stringed instrument that uses strings (important) so it is called important music. Initially, the music came from the Tapin area, South Kalimantan. Panting is a musical instrument that is picked which is shaped like an Arab cork but is smaller in size. In the past, panting music was only played individually or solo. The name of the important music comes from the name of the musical instrument itself, because in important music that is famous for its musical instruments and which plays a very important role. Until now, panting is still famous as traditional music originating from South Kalimantan.

Besides that, there is a traditional Banjar music art, namely Kentung. This music comes from the Banjar Regency area, namely in the village of Sungai Alat, Astambul and the village of Bincau, Martapura. At present, this kentung music has begun to scarce. The past of this musical instrument was contested. In this match not only the sound, but also the things that are magical, such as if in the match this instrument can be broken or cannot be heard from the opponent's competition.

=== Traditional Dance ===
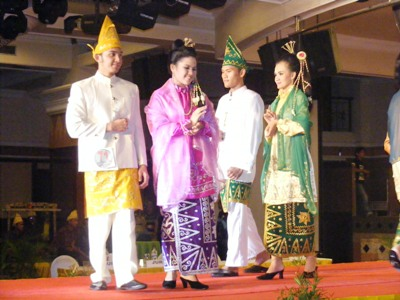
Banjarese traditional clothes

Broadly speaking, dance from South Kalimantan is from the indigenous ethnic culture of Banjar and ethnic Dayaks. Banjar dance evolved from the time of the Banjar Sultanate and was influenced by Javanese and Malay culture, such as Japin Dance and Baksa kembang Dance.

Banjar dance art is divided into two, namely dance developed in the palace (palace), and dance art developed by the people. Kraton dance is marked by the name "Baksa" which comes from the Javanese language (beksan) which signifies the smoothness of motion in the dance. These dances have been around for hundreds of years, since the Hindu era, but the movements and clothing have been adapted to the current situation and conditions. For example, certain movements that are considered incompatible with Islamic adab change a little.

=== Traditional House ===
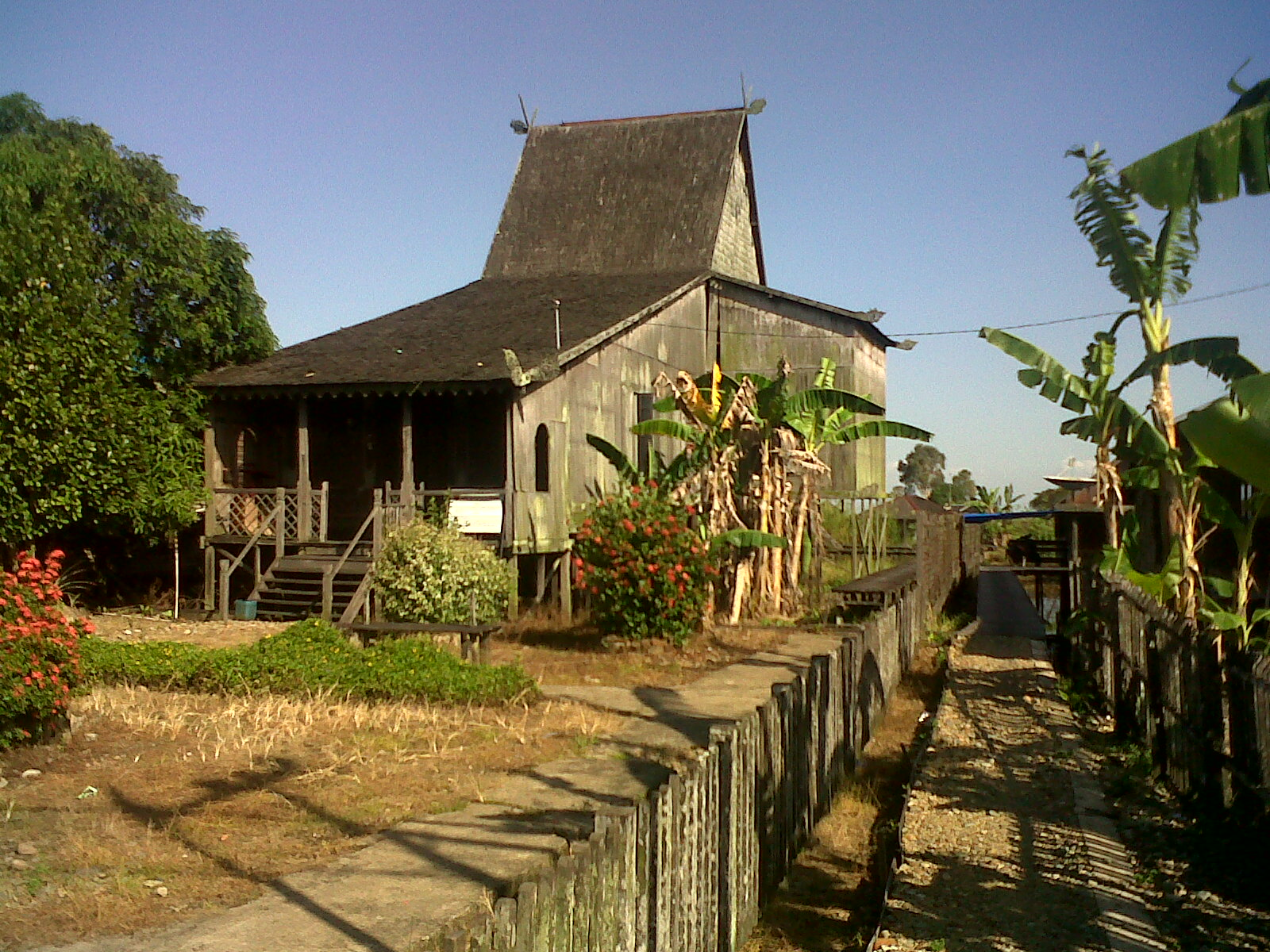
A Rumah Bubungan Tinggi

Rumah Bubungan Tinggi or Rumah Banjar or Rumah Ba-anjung is the most iconic type of house in South Kalimantan. In the old kingdom time, this house is the core building in a complex of a palace. This particular house is where the King and his family would reside. Since 1850, there are various building around it with their own respective functions. The name "Bubungan Tinggi" refers to its sharp roof (45 degrees steep). This type of house became so popular, that people out of the royalty also took interest in building it. Hence, there are houses with this type of architecture all over South Kalimantan, and even crossing the borders of Central Kalimantan and East Kalimantan. This type of house, of course, took more money than the usual house, so it was naturally the house of the rich.

Nowadays most Banjar people have little interest in building Bubungan Tinggi. Beside the fact that it takes a lot of money to build, people nowadays prefer the "modern" type of house. Its cultural values, however, are still appreciated. It is the main figure in both South Kalimantan and Banjarmasin's coat of arms. Many of the modern governmental buildings are built with its traits.

=== Theater ===
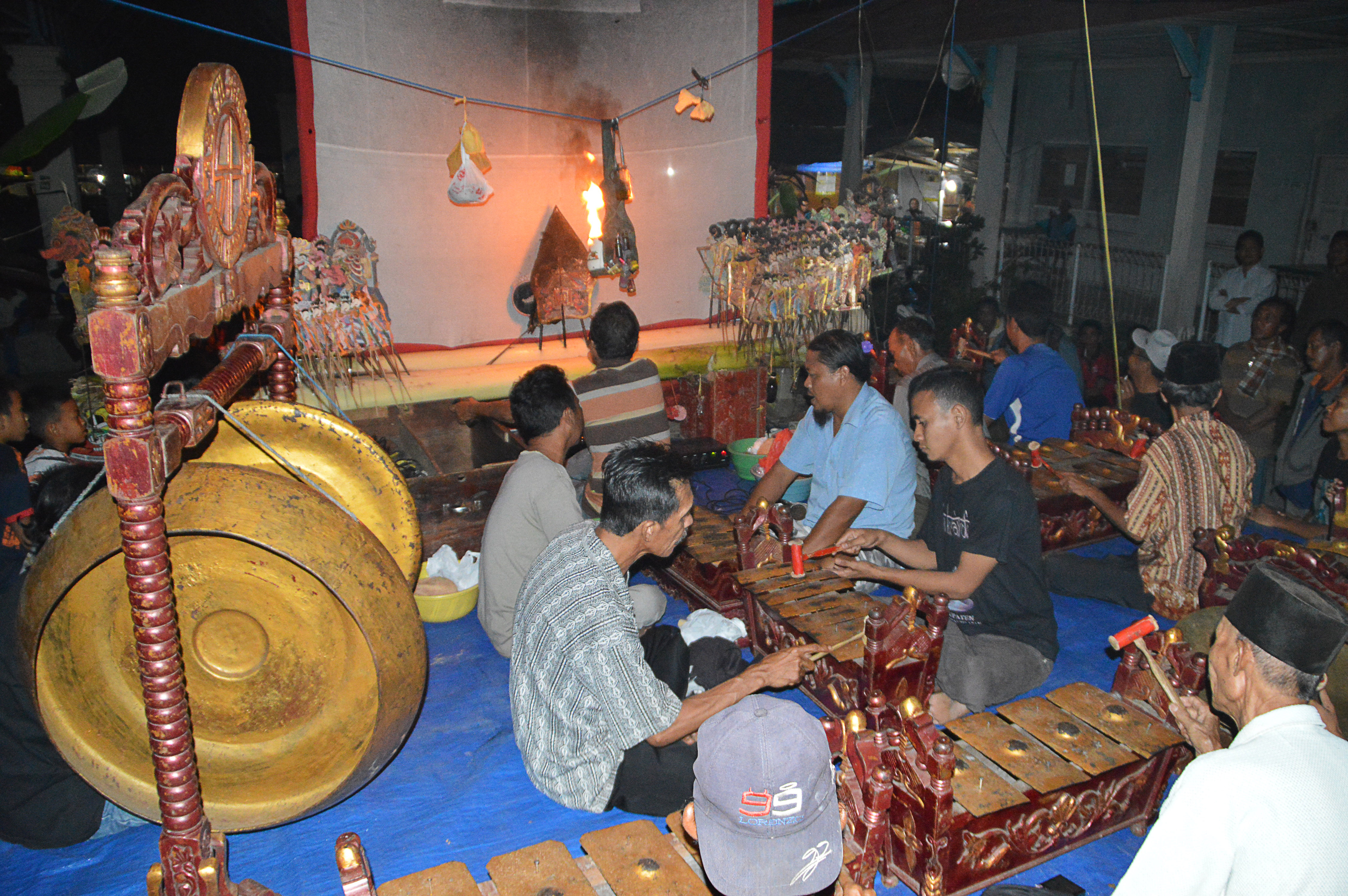
Banjarese men performing the Wayang Banjar

The only traditional theater art that developed on the island of Borneo was Mamanda. Mamanda is theater art or traditional performances originating from South Kalimantan. Compared to other performing arts, Mamanda is more similar to Lenong in terms of the relationship between players and spectators. This interaction made the audience become active in conveying funny comments which allegedly could make the atmosphere more lively.

The difference is Lenong art is now more in line with the times than the monotonous Mamanda in the royal storyline, since in Mamanda art the characters played are standard figures such as Raja, Prime Minister, Mangkubumi, Wazir, Commander-in-Chief, First Hope, Second Hope, Khadam (Clown/aide), Empress and Sandut (Putri).

These characters must be present in every performance. In order not to be left behind, Mamanda's figures were often added with other figures such as the King from another kingdom, pirates, genie, companies and other additional figures to enrich the story.

It was alleged that the term Mamanda was used because in the play, players such as the Vizier, Minister, and Mangkubumi were called the pamanda or mamanda by the King. Mamanda etymologically consists of the word mama (mamarina) which means uncle in Banjar language and nda which means honorable. So mamanda means honorable uncle. That is "greeting" to uncles who are respected in the kinship system or family.

=== Traditional Weapon ===
Kris is one of the traditional weapons in South Kalimantan. The size is at least 30 cm long and the eyes are stuck in another. Weapons made of iron mixed with other metals.

Mandau, also called Parang Ilang, is a short-stemmed machete. Mandau became the main identity and weapon of the Dayak community in addition to other machete types. In general, Dayak tribes inhabiting the island of Borneo have several types of machete sharp weapons which are divided into two types, namely inland Dayak and coastal Dayak.

Sungga is one of the weapons used in the Banjar War in the Gunung Madang Fort area, Kandangan, Hulu Sungai Selatan. This weapon was installed under a bridge that was made as a trap, so that when traversed by the enemy (Dutch army), then the bridge will collapse and the enemy that fell stuck on the sungga.

== Economy ==
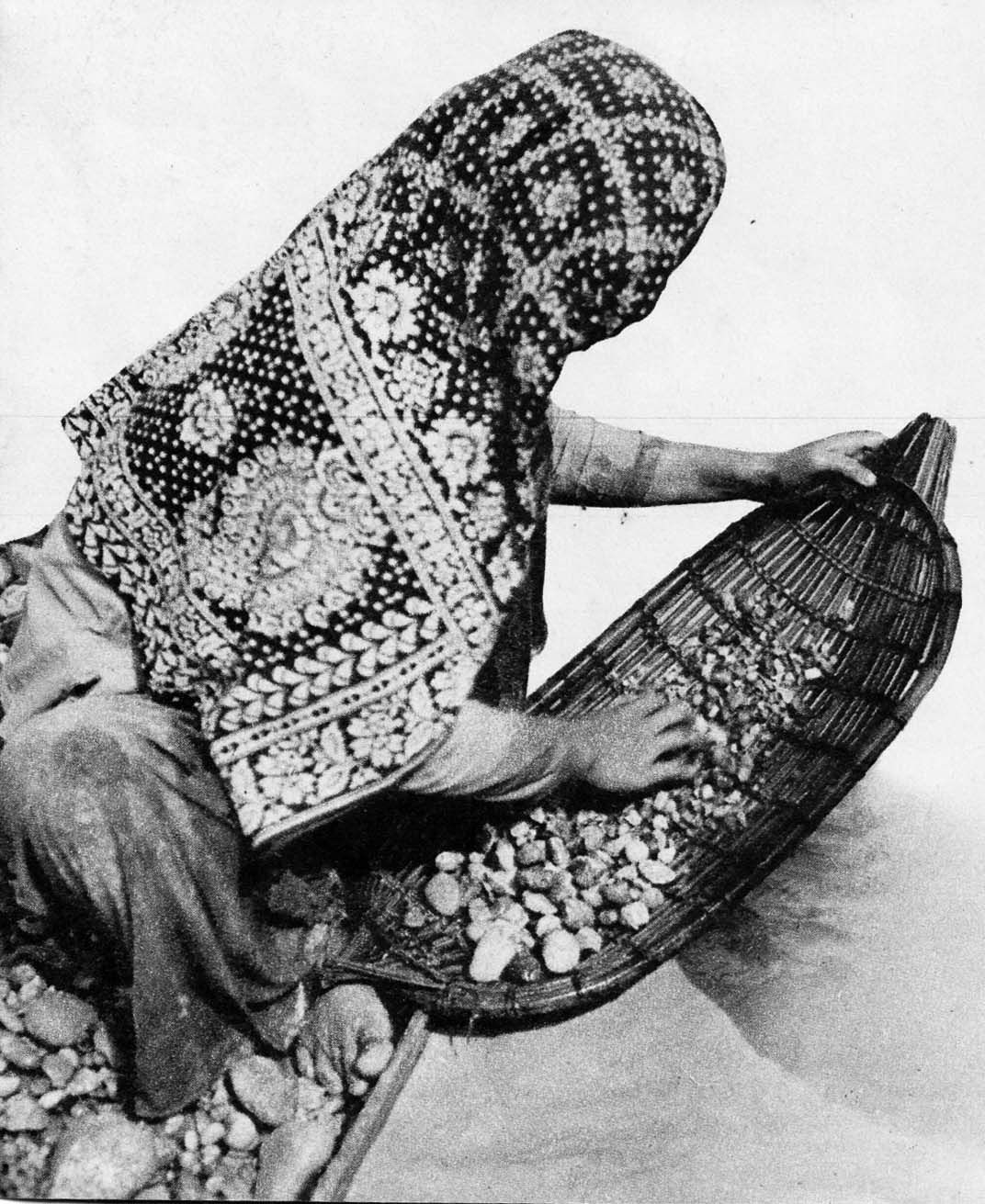
Diamond mining in Martapura

In 2010, South Kalimantan's exports grew by 27%, the highest increase among all Indonesian provinces. The province's total exports rank seventh out of all provinces.

=== Workforce ===
The agricultural sector is the sector that absorbs the most labor. In February 2012, 38.20 percent of the workforce was absorbed by the agricultural sector. The trade sector is the second largest sector in employment, which is 20.59 percent. The status of workers in South Kalimantan is still dominated by workers who work in the informal sector. In February 2012, 63.20 percent were workers in the informal sector. Most of the workers were self-employed (19.66 percent), tried to be assisted by temporary workers (18.92 percent) and free workers and unpaid workers (24.61 percent). Workers in the formal sector were recorded at 36.80 percent, consisting of workers with labor / employee status (33.35 percent) and working status assisted by permanent workers (3.45 percent).

=== Agriculture and Plantation ===
The main product of agriculture is rice, in addition to corn, cassava and sweet potatoes. While fruits consist of oranges, papaya, bananas, durian, rambutan, kasturi and langsat. Palm oil is also common in South Kalimantan.

=== Industry ===
Industry in South Kalimantan is dominated by micro and small manufacturing industries, followed by large and medium manufacturing industries. Until 2010, the number of business units totaled 60,432 units, an increase of 10.92% compared to 2009.

=== Finance and Banking ===
In 2009, due to the 2008 financial crisis, banks in South Kalimantan recorded lower growth compared to the previous year. However, some indicators still recorded positive growth. The volume of South Kalimantan's banking business (assets) grew 13.3% from the end of 2008 to reach Rp21.24 trillion. This asset growth is mainly supported by credit growth and deposits.

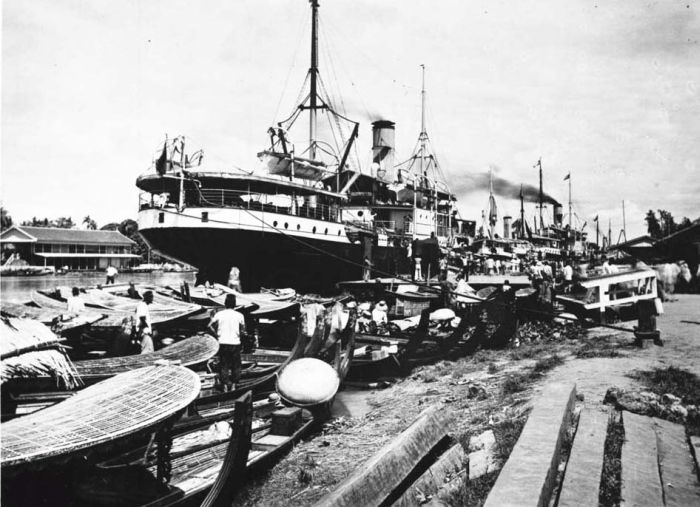
Ships on the Martapura River during the Dutch colonial era

Public funds collected by South Kalimantan banking at the end of 2009 reached IDR 18.33 trillion or grew by 13% (y-o-y). all types of accounts in the form of demand deposits, savings accounts, and time deposits show positive growth of 10.51% (y-o-y), 17% (y-o-y), and 5.86% (y-o-y), respectively.

Meanwhile, in terms of lending, at the end of December 2009 the amount of loans disbursed reached Rp13.95 trillion or grew by 16% (y-o-y). This credit growth was mainly supported by consumption credit and investment credit which grew quite high at 24.81% (y-o-y) and 30.42% (y-o-y).

With these developments, the banking intermediation function reflected by the LDR (Loan to Deposit Ratio) ratio in 2009 showed an increase, from 74% in 2008 to 75.7%. Meanwhile, thanks to the hard work of all the authorities, credit risk was maintained at a safe level in 2009 with an NPL ratio of 2.14% lower than the NPL ratio at the end of 2008 which reached 4.76%.

The number of banking institutions in South Kalimantan consists of 15 conventional commercial banks, 6 Islamic public banks, 24 rural credit banks (BPR) and 1 Sharia BPR, with a network of 196 offices, and 123 ATM support.

== Transportation ==
In South Kalimantan, there are various types of transportation used by the community. Comparison of the use of land and water transportation for the South Kalimantan region is quite balanced. This is due to the geographical factor of the South Kalimantan region which has many rivers and swamps, especially for the Banjarmasin area which is divided by rivers.

A road highways connects Palangka Raya in Central Kalimantan and Banjarmasin. The distance from Palangka Raya to Banjarmasin in South Kalimantan, for example, can be taken from 3 to 4 hours with a distance of about 180 km. Another highway also connects Banjarmasin to Balikpapan in East Kalimantan. The distance from Banjarmasin to Balikpapan can be taken around 11 to 12 hours with a distance about 470 km. Most of the road in South Kalimantan has been asphalted, however, there are some roads in the interior part of the province that is in a very poor condition. As there are many rivers in South Kalimantan, many bridges have been built to accommodate cars. Currently, the provincial government has disbursed funds of Rp 200 billion to continue the construction of a bridge that connects Kotabaru in Laut Island and Batulicin in the mainland. Construction is now still in the planning stage.

Syamsudin Noor International Airport is the main airport of Banjarmasin as well as the province in a whole. The airport serves inter-island flights to other major Indonesian cities such as Jakarta, Surabaya and Yogyakarta. Moreover, the airport also serves inte-Kalimantan flights to cities such as Pontianak, Balikpapan and Samarinda. Currently, the airport is being developed. It is hoped that it can accommodate international flights in the future. There are other smaller airport in South Kalimantan, such as Gusti Syamsir Alam Airport in Kotabaru and Bersujud Airport in Batulicin. One of the main problem for air transportation in South Kalimantan is that the region is often enveloped with haze due to the forest fires.

Transportation in South Kalimantan

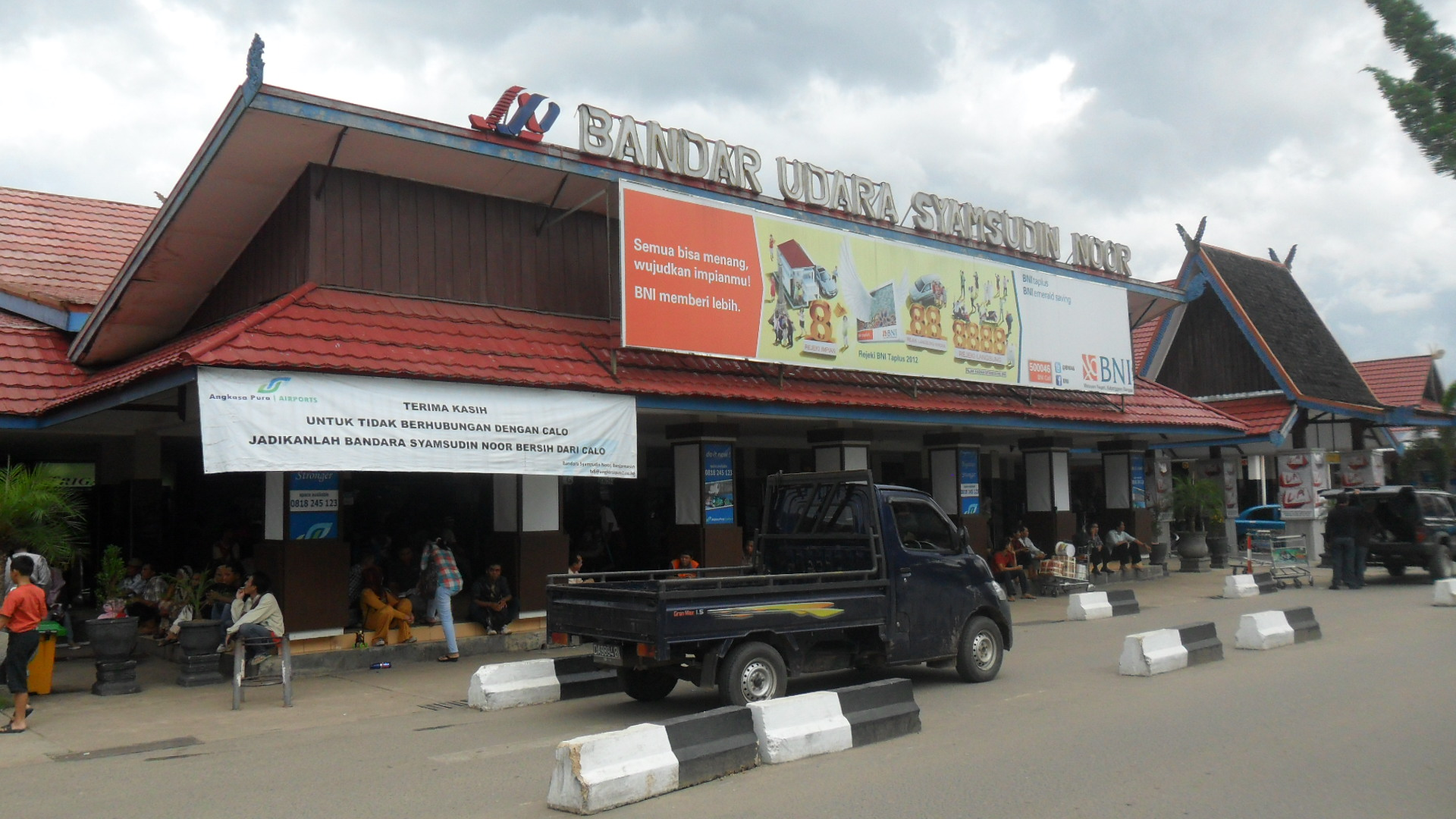
Syamsudin Noor International Airport, the main gateway to Banjarmasin and the province

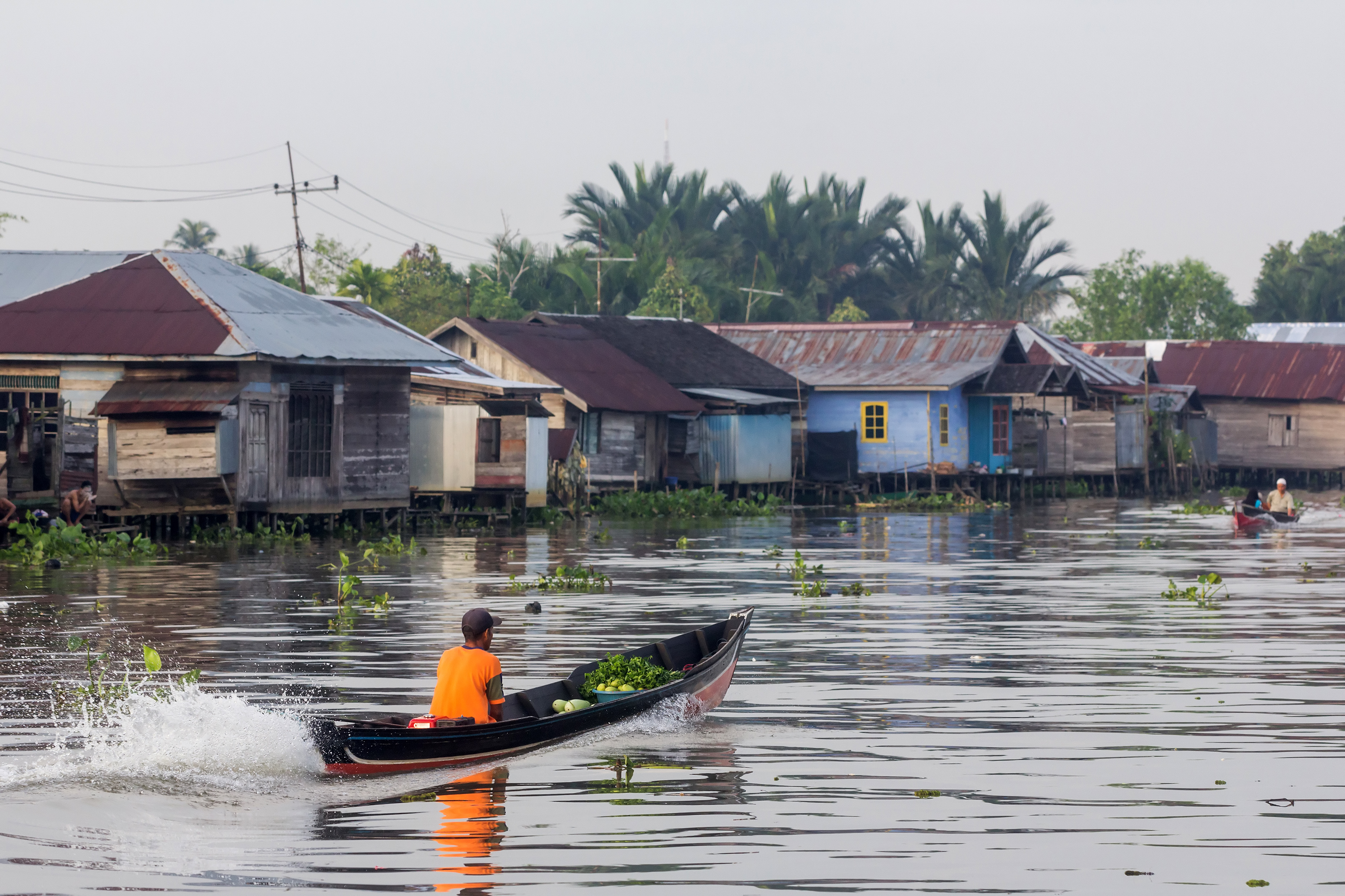
Traditional boats on the Martapura River

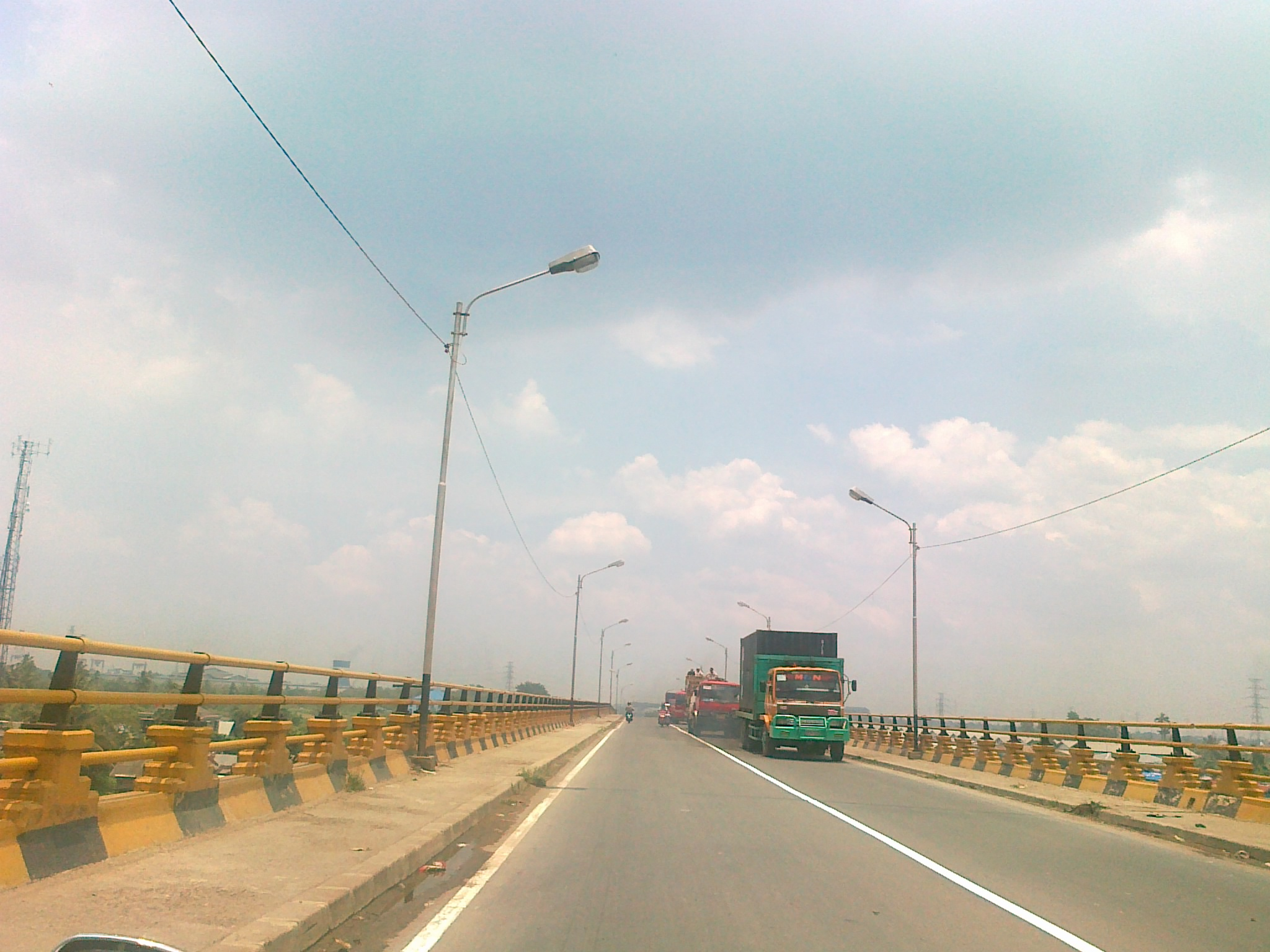
Road in Banjarmasin city

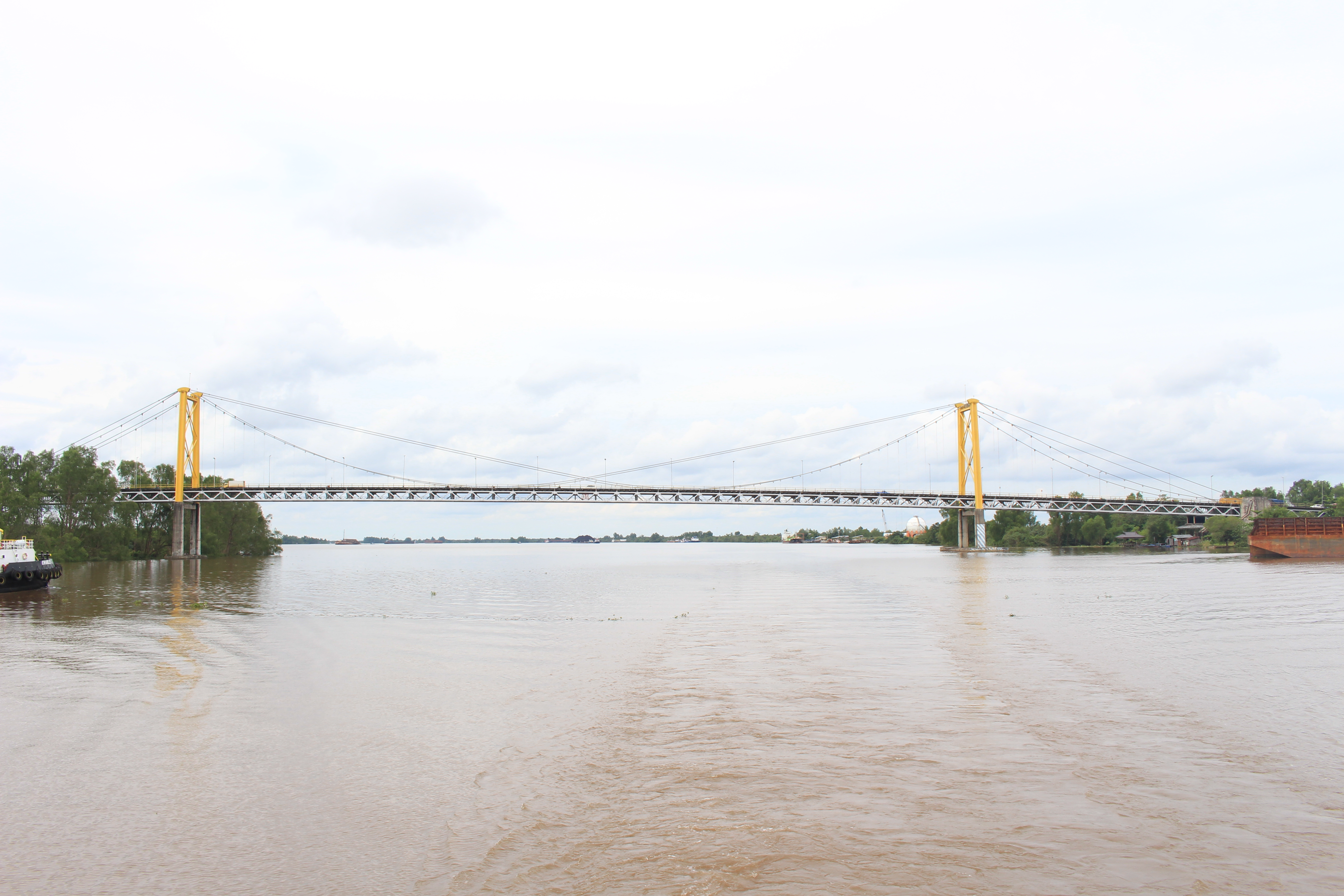
Barito Bridge

Currently, there is no railway in South Kalimantan. However, the government is currently considering building a railway line between Batulicin and Banjarbaru, which would be part of the Trans-Kalimantan railway system. This would cut the trip from the originally 5 hours by road to only 2 hours. Until now, the government still has not determined the cooperation scheme for railways in South Kalimantan, whether it is purely a collaboration between the government and other business entities. Is the city district with its assets its beneficiaries, while the business entity to carry out its operations is still awaiting its continuation. The first segment, will connect Kandangan in South Hulu Sungai Regency and Rantau in Tapin Regency. This pathway has undergone the stage of environmental impact analysis (EIA), detailed engineering design (DED) and feasibility study. While the second segment which would connect Rantau-Martapura-Banjarbaru-Banjarmasin, a feasibility study has been conducted, while the environmental impact analysis (EIA) has also been carried out. Whereas for the third segment, namely Marabahan-Anjir Pasar-Wanaraya-Handil Bakti-Sungai Tabuk, the analysis of environmental impacts is still under discussion at the transportation ministry.

In addition to land transportation in South Kalimantan, there are also many known water transports because South Kalimantan does have many rivers and straits. Transportation such as ferries, klotok boats, and speedboats, etc. are also widely used.

== Tourism ==
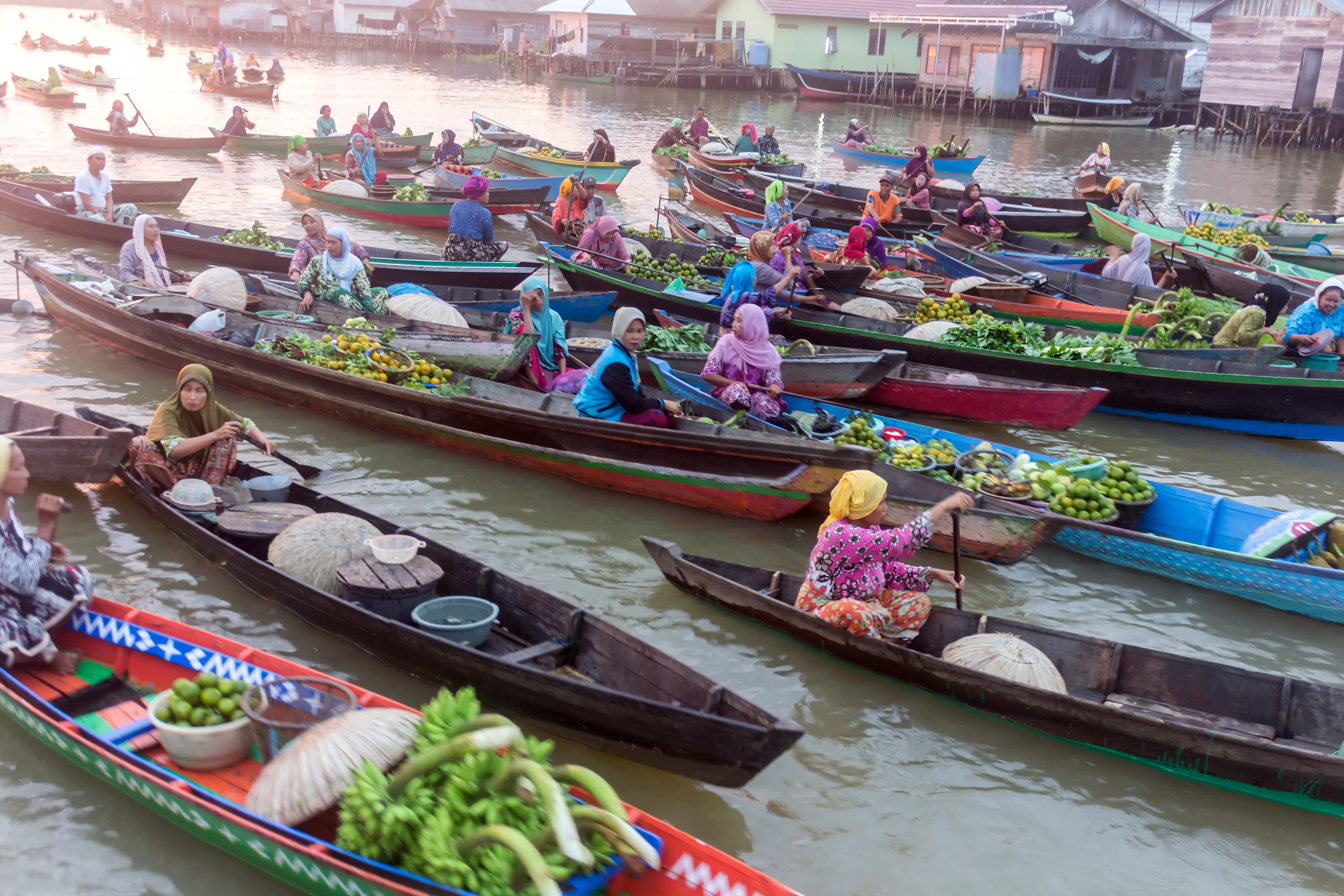
Lok Baintan Floating Market

In South Kalimantan there are some natural attractions that consist of natural forests, long rivers swerving, lakes and highlands or mountains. In addition to natural tourism, there are several cultural and historical tours in South Kalimantan that come from the heritage of the arts and culture of the region.

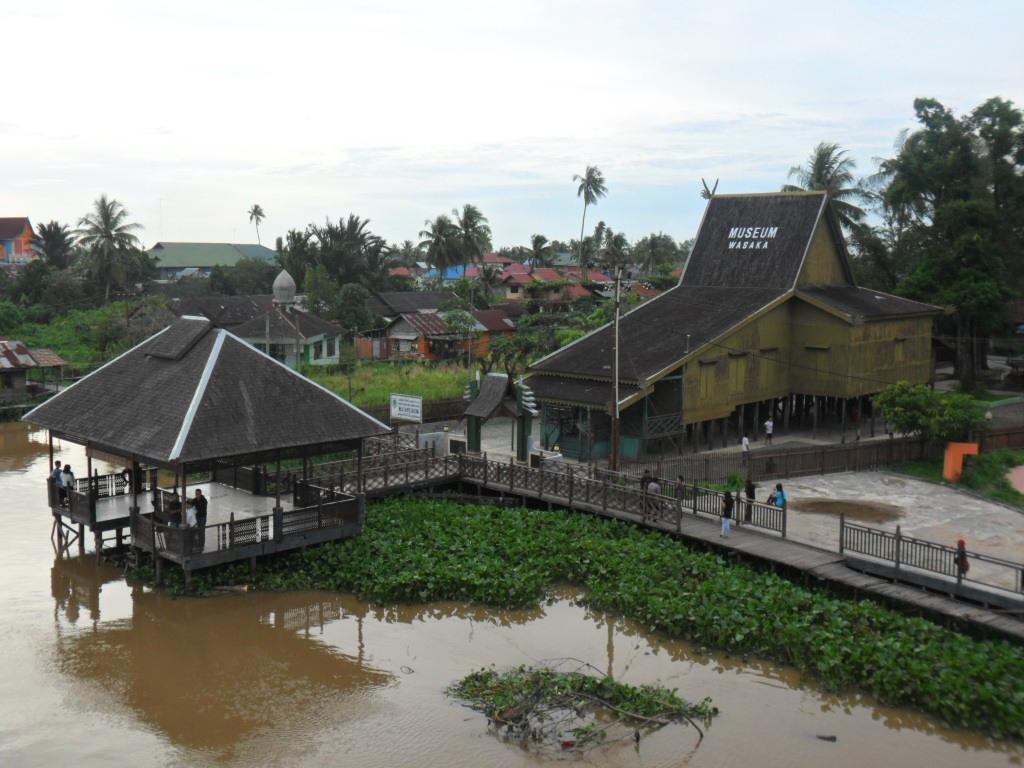
Wasaka Cultural Museum in Banjarmasin

The city of Banjarmasin is known for its floating market (Indonesian and Banjarese: pasar apung). The floating market is a traditional market that is located on the Barito River and is open between 6:30 a.m. to 8:00 pm. Traders and buyers here all use means of transportation (a type of boat) to peddle and search for their merchandise. There are several floating markets in Banjarmasin. One of the legendary and popular is the Lok Baintan floating market on the Martapura River. In this Floating Market, traders sell their wares using wooden boats known as jukung, here people can buy various kinds of plantation and agricultural products as well as other merchandise such as clothes, cakes and fish. There also some Banjar specialties namely soto banjar and nasi sop banjar. Historically, like the typical market features of the past, this market was originally a place for exchanging goods between people from garden produce and agriculture, and now it uses money exchange tools.

Loksado has become a favorite for tourists not only locally but also overseas. This sub-district, located in South Hulu Sungai Regency, is home to the Meratus Mountains and a diversity of local cultures, including the Meratus Dayak people culture.

The city of Martapura, South Kalimantan is the focal point of a diamond industry.

== Cuisine ==
Banjarese cuisine has been influenced by many cultures, such as Malay, Javanese, Chinese and Indian. One of the famous culinary of this province is Soto Banjar, served in many restaurants throughout the province. Soto banjar is made from chicken meat as its main ingredient, then added with various spices such as onion, white onion, cumin, fennel, and cinnamon to make the soto more savoury. Additional juice from lime makes this dish even more fresh. This dish is usually served during lunchtime. The stalls selling Soto Banjar are not only in South Kalimantan. Outside of South Kalimantan there are also many stalls that sell Soto Banjar. Soto Banjar also has been adopted as one variant of Indomie instant noodle, representing Kalimantan cuisine.

Cuisine of South Kalimantan

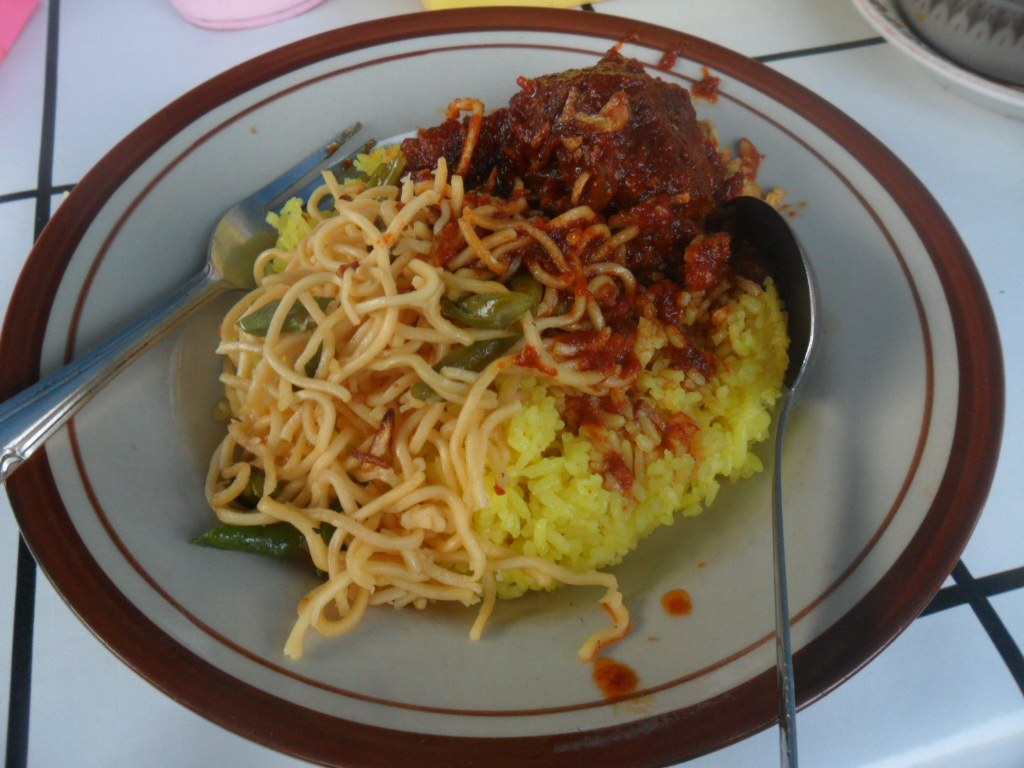
Nasi Kuning Banjar

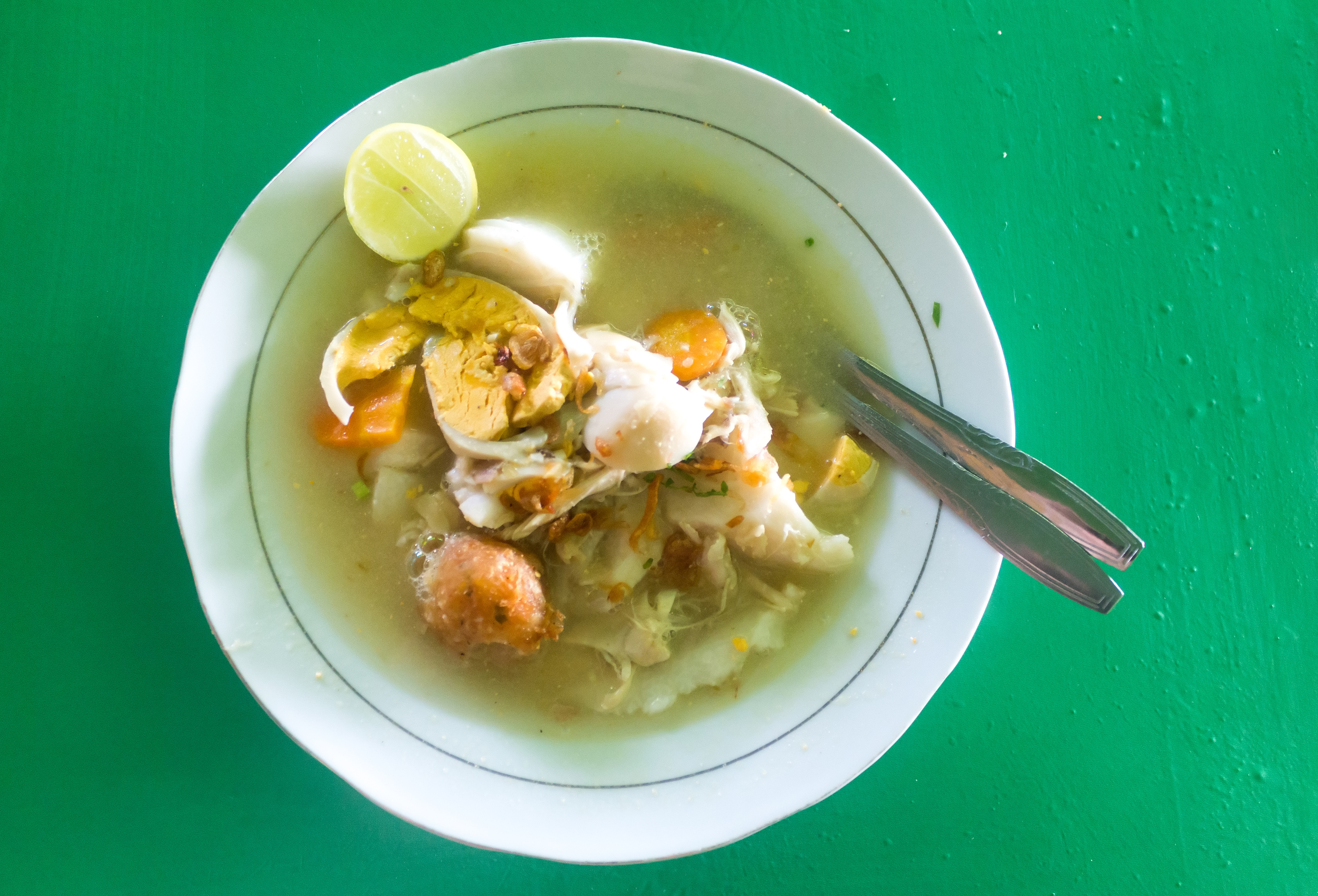
Soto Banjar, one of the most well-known Banjarese dishes

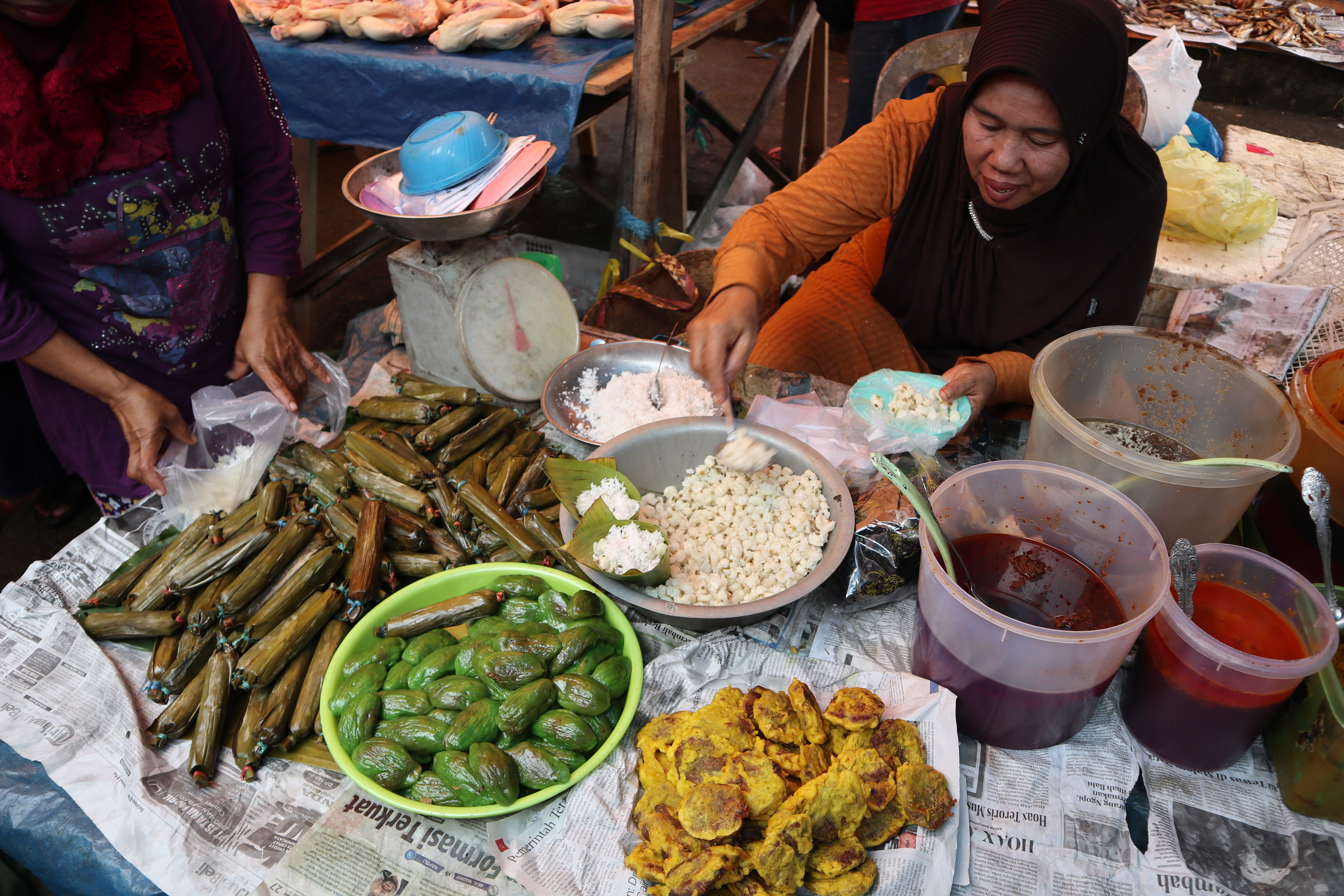
Banjarese traditional snacks being sold in a traditional market

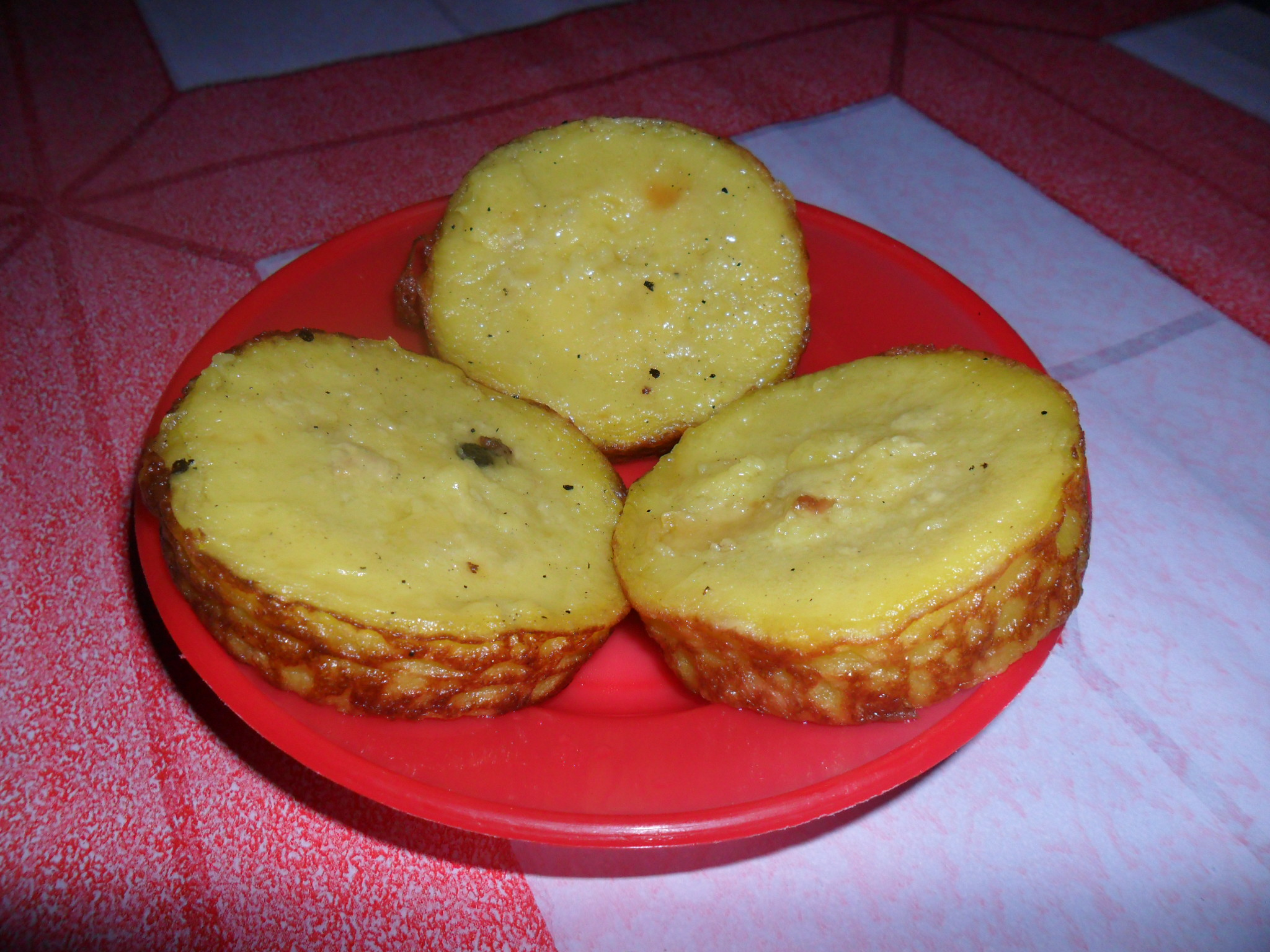
Binka, a traditional Banjarese snacks and dessert

== Coat of arms ==
The coat of arms of South Kalimantan (Lambang Kalimantan Selatan) is shaped as a shield containing several elements: a shining star, a traditional Banjar house, a diamond, rice, rubber tree, and a white ribbon.

- The shining star symbolizes belief in God Almighty.
- The black-colored Banjar traditional house (Bubungan Tinggi) represents the high culture of the Banjar people.
- The diamond symbolizes prosperity.
- Rice and rubber represent the main livelihoods of the people of South Kalimantan (farming and rubber tapping).
- The white ribbon symbolizes honesty in speech, behavior, wisdom, and solidarity.
- The provincial motto is Waja sampai kaputing, meaning "unyielding spirit and strength like steel from beginning to end."

According to Regional Regulation No. 10 of 1963, the elements contained in the provincial emblem are:

- Red shield with golden yellow border
- Inner shield in green
- Yellow star
- Traditional Banjar house "Bubungan Tinggi"
- White ribbon above and below the rice
- 17 grains of rice
- Diamond with 8 sparkles
- Rubber tree with 4 tapping cuts on the left and 5 on the right.

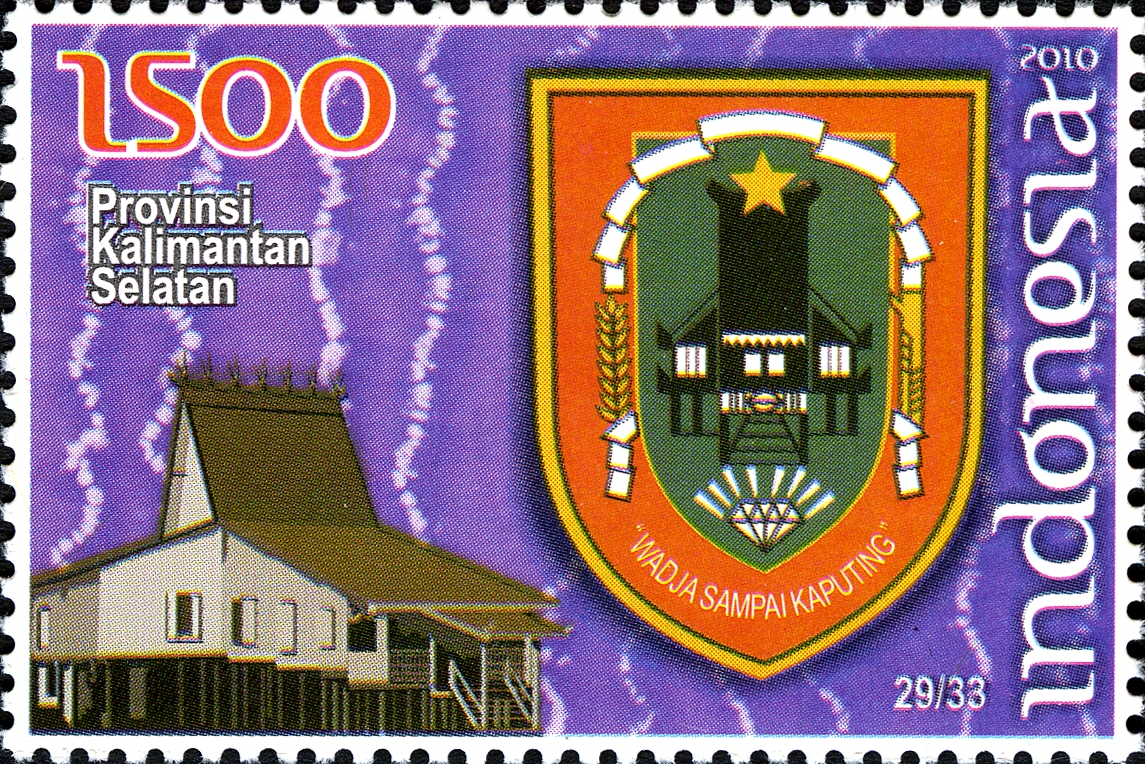
Stamp featuring the coat of arms of South Kalimantan

== See also ==
- Banjar people
- Banjar language
