= Law on South Kalimantan province =

The Law on South Kalimantan province (Indonesian: Undang-Undang tentang Provinsi Kalimantan Selatan), officially Law Number 8 of 2022 (Indonesian: Undang-Undang Nomor 8 Tahun 2022), is a law passed by the People's Representative Council of Indonesia regarding the existence of the province of South Kalimantan. The law is one of several laws passed with relatively minor changes to provide an updated legal basis for the existence of Indonesian provinces; previously, the legal standing for many Indonesian provinces was based on laws from the era of the United States of Indonesia. However, while other provinces' laws were passed uncontroversially without major change, South Kalimantan's province law was passed with a sudden change of the capital city from Banjarmasin to Banjarbaru. This change led to a court challenge from elements associated with Banjarmasin city, with consequent response from Banjarbaru city.

The change of capital city location enjoyed popular support within Banjarbaru, but faced general opposition from residents and officials of Banjarmasin city. Lawyers representing opponents of the change deemed it "a constitutional coup". On 29 September 2022, the Constitutional Court of Indonesia ruled against the opponents, and the capital officially changed from Banjarmasin to Banjarbaru.

== Background ==
In the aftermath of the fall of Suharto and the rapid decentralization that followed, many new regencies and cities were created in Indonesia. The majority of Indonesian provinces, however, had their legal standing from laws of the United States of Indonesia era. These laws did not mention any post-2002 developments. The laws also referred to the now-defunct 1950 Constitution instead of the current 1945 Constitution. To provide legal certainty on the existence of many provinces, several bills were deliberated in Parliament. The changes within these laws were relatively minor, following the Ministry of Home Affairs' directive that discussion of the bill should not get out of hand nor include any major changes. The goal of the bills was to provide a more stable legal background for provinces, especially to support regional elections and laws passed by regional governments.

On 15 February 2022, seven bills were enacted into law by Parliament, regarding the provinces of South Sulawesi, North Sulawesi, Central Sulawesi, Southeast Sulawesi, South Kalimantan, West Kalimantan, and East Kalimantan. However, the law passed for South Kalimantan located the capital in Banjarbaru instead of Banjarmasin, to the surprise of both cities. The mayor of Banjarmasin, Ibnu Sina, criticized the law, saying that Banjarmasin was never consulted previously. However, the mayor of Banjarbaru, Aditya Mufti Ariffin, welcomed the change, stating that it was the best gift he could receive on the first anniversary of his tenure in the city. The provincial government of South Kalimantan supported the move from Banjarmasin to Banjarbaru, stating that it would promote development.

== Content ==
The law contains eight chapters which mainly describe the provincial boundaries and its previous legal basis.

1. Chapter 1 acknowledges the existence of the province previously based on Law Number 25 of 1956.
2. Chapter 2 states the date of creation of the province as 7 December 1956.
3. Chapter 3 lists regencies and cities contained within the province.
4. Chapter 4 locates the capital city of the province, which is Banjarbaru.
5. Chapter 5 mentions regional characteristics of the province.
6. Chapter 5 reiterates that governance of the province shall be in accordance with existing laws.
7. Chapter 7 declares that the previous legal standing of the province, which comprises Law Number 25 of 1956 and Law Number 21 of 1958, has been superseded by this law.
8. Chapter 8 states that this law shall be in effect after its passing.

== Reaction and court battle ==
The change of the capital location occurs in chapter four, regarding the capital of South Kalimantan, which states that the "capital of South Kalimantan province is located in Banjarbaru". Immediately after the passing of the law, the mayor of Banjarmasin Ibnu Sina stated that he will challenge the law in the Constitutional Court. He also stated that there was no mention of moving the capital prior to the law being passed, and that in the province's Regional Medium-Term Plan (Indonesian: Rencana Jangka Menengah Daerah), there was only a mention of moving the seat of government and official buildings to Banjarbaru and not the capital status. On March, a group called Banjarmasin City Forum was formed by 52 people from different backgrounds such as university students, civil servants, and local parliament members to challenge the law in the court. The group later hired a law firm called Borneo Law Firm to support their judicial review. The Banjarmasin People's Representative Council unanimously decided as well during a parliamentary session to file for judicial review of the change of capital on 24 March 2022. Ummah Party also stated their support for judicial review against the law.

Several arguments were presented by Banjarmasin city, such as the historical significance of the city for the region, the disruptive and divisive nature of the law as perceived by the general public, and lack of public consultation. They also argued that there was no provision for a transition period between Banjarmasin as capital to Banjarbaru and further criticised the quality of Parliament's provided academic analysis. Banjarbaru city then accepted the Constitutional Court's invitation to defend their case. Banjarbaru argued that the capital move was supported by Banjar Regency and Balangan Regency. Banjarbaru also challenged Banjarmasin's argument on historical significance, citing a 1964 provincial parliament resolution to show that Banjarbaru as a city was intended to replace Banjarmasin as capital of South Kalimantan province. The Banjarbaru side furthermore added that the supposed "loss" suffered by Banjarmasin due to the law was "imaginary". Banjarbaru's other arguments included that the city was more suitable as a capital from social, infrastructure, and geographical perspectives adding that the Banjarbaru is socially more diverse and that the move would not change or reduce any governance capabilities for South Kalimantan province. In response, the Banjarmasin side dismissed arguments from the Banjarbaru side as "having no legal standing and does not answer anything". The Banjarmasin side later argued that there was no dispute between the governments of Banjarmasin city and Banjarbaru city; rather, they were challenging a procedurally-defective law.

On 11 August 2022, Ibnu Sina claimed that the Ministry of Home Affairs had intervened in the case and sent him a request dated back to June to abandon the case. Ibnu Sina had attempted to ask the Home Minister Tito Karnavian about the request during a conference of the Association of Indonesian Cities in Padang. Tito later clarified that the request was to ensure that the judicial review would not be requested by the city itself but by third-parties. He denied that there was any deliberate intervention in the court case, and confirmed that the Ministry of Home Affairs would respect the ruling of the Constitutional Court. Aditya Mufti refused to comment further regarding rumours of intervention from the Ministry of Home Affairs and stated that he would simply respect any result from the court. The lawyer from Borneo Law Firm, Muhammad Parzi, and Ichsan Anwary, vice dean of the Faculty of Law at Lambung Mangkurat University, called the sudden change of the capital within the law a "constitutional coup". Ichsan Anwary further explained that precedents on moving provincial capitals never utilized the autonomous region law (Indonesian: Undang-Undang) itself, but later government regulation (Indonesian: Peraturan Pemerintah) instead.

On 29 September 2022, the Constitutional Court rejected the case against making Banjarbaru the capital of the province. It was later revealed that the cases submitted by Ibnu Sina and the Banjarmasin People's Representative Council were withdrawn earlier on 26 September, and the rejected case was the one submitted by non-governmental third parties: Banjarmasin City Forum, Banjarmasin Chamber of Commerce, and Borneo Law Firm.

== Aftermath ==
Following the ruling, Banjarbaru kept its new status as capital of South Kalimantan. Aditya Mufti as mayor of Banjarbaru commented that he was grateful about the result. Banjarmasin City Forum called the withdrawal by the mayor of the city and its own case defeat "regretful" and "a bitter gift for Banjarmasin city's 496th anniversary". The legal team from Banjarmasin stated that they will continue to fight and bring the case to the Regional Autonomy Advisory Council instead. The Prosperous Justice Party regretted Ibnu Sina's decision to withdraw from the case, stating that the withdrawal was made without coordination with other elements of the team.
