= Rikwanto =

Indonesian politician (born 1965 in Medan)

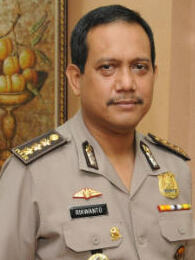
- Rikwanto in 2011

Member of the House of Representatives
- Incumbent
- Assumed office 1 October 2024
- Constituency: South Kalimantan II
- Majority: 49,936

Chief of South Kalimantan Police
- In office 16 November 2020 – 14 October 2022

Chief of North Maluku Police
- In office 11 February 2020 – 16 November 2020

Personal details
- Born: 1 January 1965 (age 61) Medan, North Sumatra, Indonesia

Military service
- Branch/service: Indonesian Police
- Years of service: 1988–2022
- Rank: Inspector general

Rikwanto (born 1 January 1965) is an Indonesian former police officer and politician who has been a member of the House of Representatives from Golkar since October 2024, representing South Kalimantan's 2nd district. During his time at the Indonesian Police, he had headed the provincial police departments of South Kalimantan and North Maluku, and before that worked in police public relations departments.

== Early life and education ==
Rikwanto was born on 1 January 1965 in Medan, North Sumatra. After completing middle school in Jakarta and high school in Medan, he enrolled at the Indonesian Police Academy, and graduated in 1988. Rikwanto later studied at the Indonesian Police Academic College (graduated 1997), Gadjah Mada University (master's degree, graduated 2008) and Diponegoro University (doctorate in law, received 2023).

== Career ==
=== Police ===
As a police officer, Rikwanto had been chief of the police departments in Karanganyar and Klaten, and then he became deputy police chief of Banyumas' regional police, before he was assigned to the Police Leadership and Staff School in 2010. In December 2011, Rikwanto was appointed head of public relations at the Greater Jakarta Metropolitan Regional Police (Polda Metro Jaya). He held this post until December 2014, when he was assigned to the Central Police Headquarters.

After working at the Police Headquarters' public relations department for some time, Rikwanto became deputy chief of the regional police of Central Kalimantan, and on 11 February 2020 he was appointed Chief of the North Maluku Regional Police. He held this post until 20 November 2020, when he was appointed Chief of the South Kalimantan Regional Police.

His time at South Kalimantan was during the COVID-19 pandemic in Indonesia, and Rikwanto was in charge of enforcing large-scale social restrictions put in place by the provincial governor. According to Rikwanto, while general crime statistics saw a decline during the period, violent carjackings saw a rise. On 14 October 2022, Rikwanto was replaced as South Kalimantan's police chief by Andi Rian Djajadi due to Rikwanto's upcoming retirement from the force. Rikwanto's final rank was police inspector general.

=== Politics ===
Rikwanto joined the Golkar party after he retired from the police force. In the 2024 Indonesian legislative election, Rikwanto ran for a seat in the House of Representatives from South Kalimantan's 2nd district. Rikwanto won 49,936 seats, behind fellow Golkar candidate Hasnuryadi Sulaiman, and did not win a seat in the election. However, Sulaiman resigned from his elected seat to run in the 2024 South Kalimantan gubernatorial election, and hence Rikwanto took the seat in his place.

Within the house, Rikwanto is part of the Third Commission which covered law, human rights, and security.

== Personal life ==
Rikwanto is married to Lisnawati, and the couple has three sons. Rikwanto described himself as a fan of dangdut music, in particular Rhoma Irama.
