= 2024 South Kalimantan gubernatorial election =

- 27 November 2024
- Turnout: 72.38% (▲7.35pp)
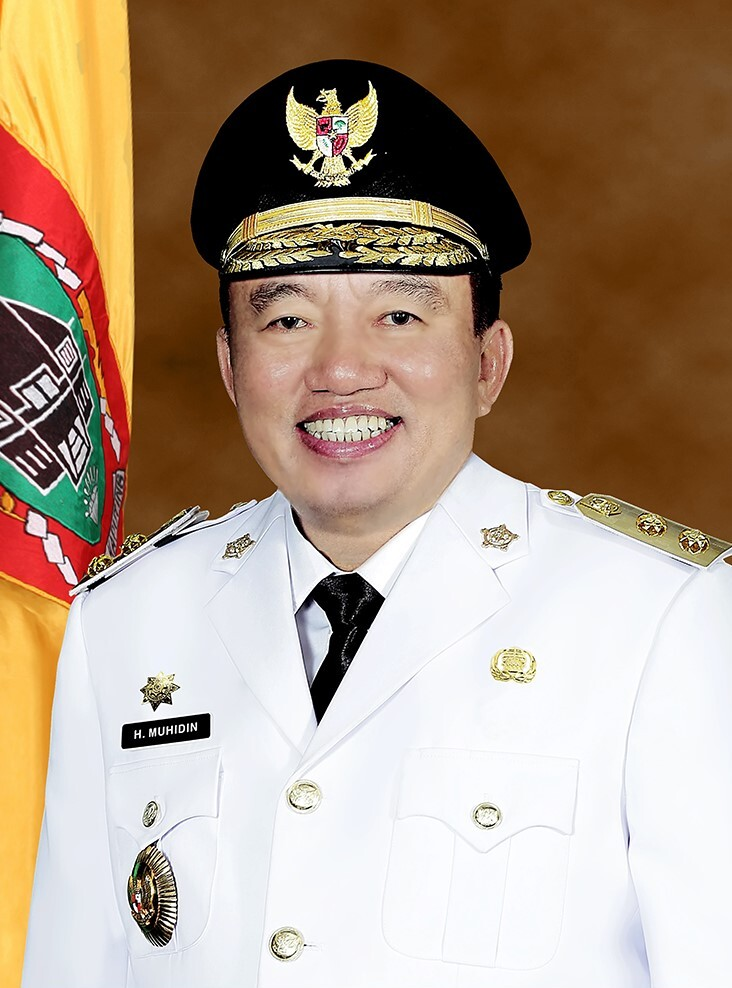

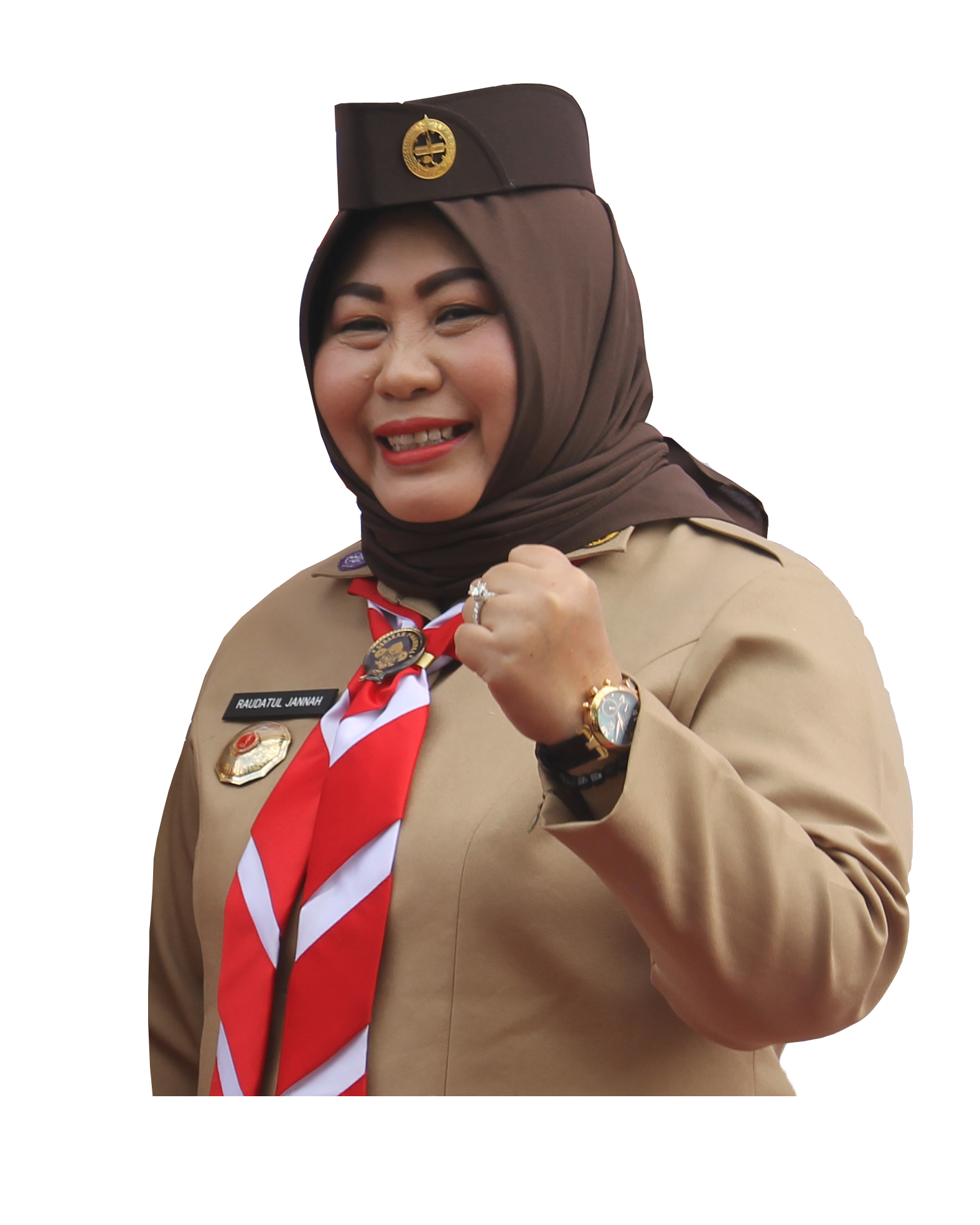
Candidate	Muhidin	Raudatul Jannah
Party	PAN	Golkar
Alliance	–	KIM Plus
Running mate	Hasnuryadi Sulaiman	Akhmad Rozanie Himawan Nugraha
Popular vote	1,629,456	348,118
Percentage	82.40%	17.60%
- Results by district
Governor before election
Muhidin
PAN
Elected Governor
Muhidin
PAN

The 2024 South Kalimantan gubernatorial election was held on 27 November 2024 as part of nationwide local elections to elect the governor of South Kalimantan for a five-year term. The previous election was held in 2020. Incumbent Governor Muhidin of the National Mandate Party (PAN) won the election in a landslide with 82% of the vote. Muhidin succeeded Sahbirin Noor in 2024 following the latter's resignation. Muhidin's sole opponent, Raudatul Jannah of Golkar and wife of Sahbirin Noor, received 17% of the vote.

== Electoral system ==
The election, like other local elections in 2024, follow the first-past-the-post system where the candidate with the most votes wins the election, even if they do not win a majority. It is possible for a candidate to run uncontested, in which case the candidate is still required to win a majority of votes "against" an "empty box" option. Should the candidate fail to do so, the election will be repeated on a later date.

== Candidates ==
According to electoral regulations, in order to qualify for the election, candidates were required to secure support from a political party or a coalition of parties controlling 11 seats (20 percent of all seats) in the South Kalimantan Regional House of Representatives (DPRD). Golkar, with 13 of 55 seats, is the only party eligible to nominate a candidate without forming a coalition with other parties. Candidates may alternatively demonstrate support to run as an independent in form of photocopies of identity cards, which in South Kalimantan's case corresponds to 257,144 copies. No independent candidates registered with the General Elections Commission (KPU) prior to the set deadline on 12 May 2024.

The incumbent governor, Sahbirin Noor, who was elected to two terms and was thus ineligible to contest the election, resigned in November 2024, before the expiration of his second term. He was succeeded by Vice Governor Muhidin.

=== Potential ===
The following are individuals who have either been publicly mentioned as a potential candidate by a political party in the DPRD, publicly declared their candidacy with press coverage, or considered as a potential candidate by media outlets:

- Muhidin (PAN), incumbent governor.

- Hasnuryadi Sulaiman (Golkar), member of the House of Representatives, CEO of football club PS Barito Putera (as running mate).

- Denny Indrayana (Demokrat), former deputy minister of law and human rights.
- Raudhatul Jannah, head of the provincial health service and wife of Sahbirin Noor.
- Ibnu Sina (Demokrat), two-term mayor of Banjarmasin.

== Political map ==
Following the 2024 Indonesian legislative election, nine political parties are represented in the South Kalimantan DPRD:

Political parties	Seat count
Party of Functional Groups (Golkar)	13 / 55
NasDem Party	10 / 55
Great Indonesia Movement Party (Gerindra)	7 / 55
National Awakening Party (PKB)	6 / 55
National Mandate Party (PAN)	6 / 55
Prosperous Justice Party (PKS)	6 / 55
Indonesian Democratic Party of Struggle (PDI-P)	3 / 55
Democratic Party (Demokrat)	3 / 55
United Development Party (PPP)	1 / 55

== Results ==
Candidate	Running mate	Party	Votes	%
Muhidin	Hasnuryadi Sulaiman	National Mandate Party	1,629,456	82.40
Raudatul Jannah	Akhmad Rozanie Himawan Nugraha	Golkar	348,118	17.60
Total			1,977,574	100.00
Valid votes			1,977,574	89.83
Invalid/blank votes			223,968	10.17
Total votes			2,201,542	100.00
Registered voters/turnout			3,041,499	72.38
Source: KPU
