= Mayor of Banjarmasin =

- Wali Kota Banjarmasin
- Coat of arms of Banjarmasin

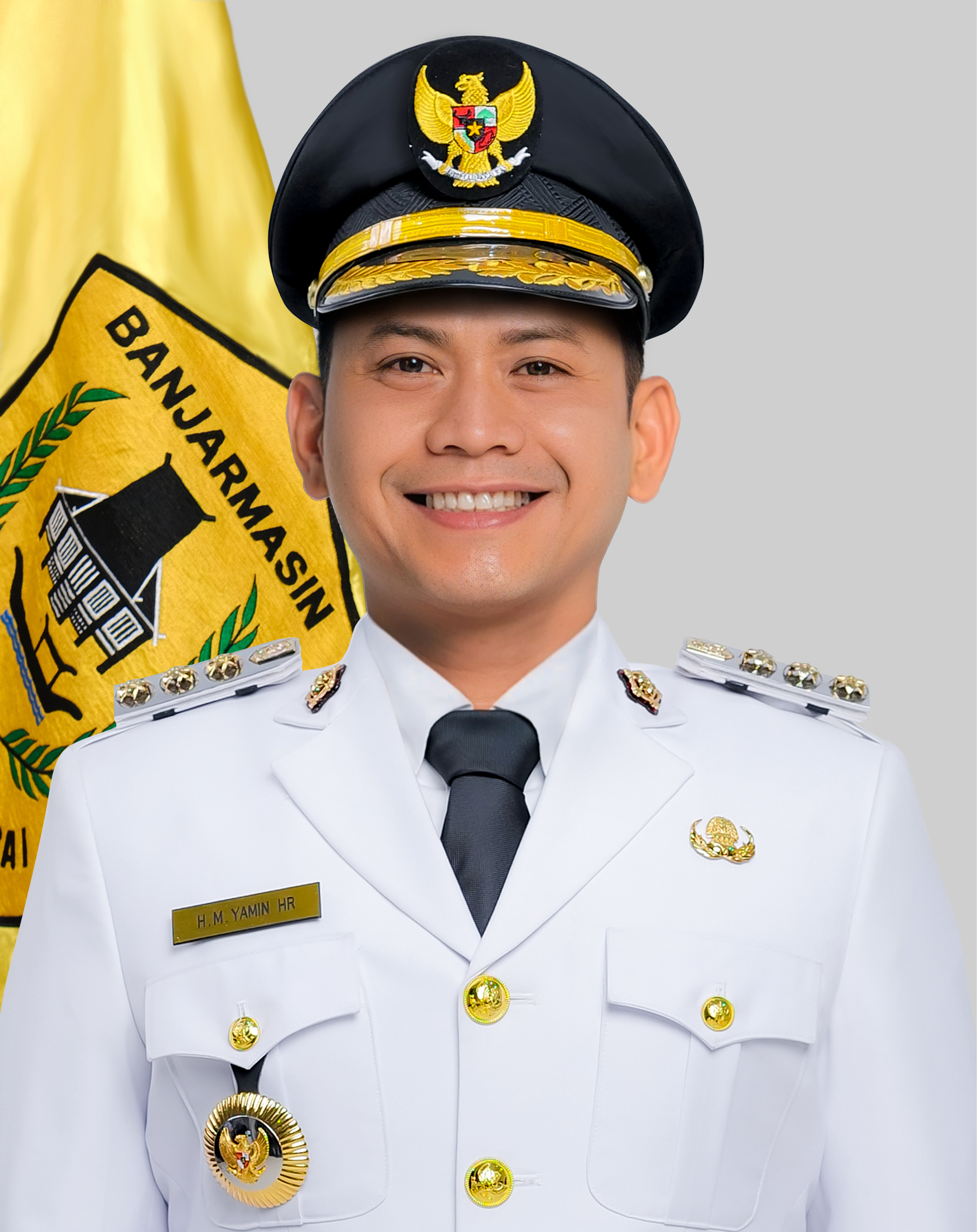
- Incumbent; Muhammad Yamin HR since 20 February 2025
- Term length: 5 years
- Inaugural holder: Mansur
- Formation: 1945
- Website: www.banjarmasinkota.go.id

Mayor of Banjarmasin is the head of the second-level region who holds the government in Banjarmasin together with the Vice Mayor and 45 members of the Banjarmasin City Regional House of Representatives. The mayor and vice mayor of Banjarmasin are elected through general elections held every 5 years. The first mayor of Banjarmasin was Mansur, who governed the city period from 1945 to 1950.

== List ==
The following is a list of the names of the Mayors of Banjarmasin from time to time.

Mayor of Banjarmasin
Num.	Portrait	Mayor	Beginning of office	End of Term	Political Party / Faction	Period	Note.	Vice mayor
1		Mansur	1945	1950	Independent	1		—
2		Aidan Sinaga	1950	1958	SKI	2		—
3		Burhan Afhani	1958	1960	Independent	3		—
4		H. Horman	1960	1965	Independent	4		—
5		M. Hanafiah	1965	1970	Independent	5		—
6		Riduan Iman	1971	1973	Independent	6		—
7		Siddik Susanto	1974	1978	Independent	7		—
8		Komaruddin	1978	1984	ABRI–AD	8		—
9		M. Effendi Ritonga	1984	1989	ABRI–AD	9		—
10		Sadjoko	1989	1999	Independent	10		—
11		Sofyan Arpan	1999	23 August 2003	Independent	11	(Note: The incumbent mayor died while in office.)	Midfai Yabani
12		Midfai Yabani	2003	2005	Independent	11		—
13		Yudhi Wahyuni	12 August 2005	12 August 2010	PAN	12 (2005)		Alwi Sahlan
14		Muhidin	12 August 2010	12 August 2015	PAN	13 (2010)		Irwan Anshari
15		Ibnu Sina	17 February 2016	17 February 2021	PKS	14 (2015)		Hermansyah
15		Ibnu Sina	23 June 2021	20 February 2025	Demokrat	15 (2020)		Arifin Noor
16		Muhammad Yamin HR	20 February 2025	Incumbent	Gerindra	16 (2024)		Ananda

== Temporary replacement ==
In the government stack, a regional head who submits himself to leave or temporarily resigns from his position to the central government, then the Minister of Home Affairs prepares a replacement who is a bureaucrat in the regional government or even a vice mayor, including when the mayor's position is in a transition period.

Portrait	Mayor	Party	Beginning	End	Duration	Period	Definitive	Ref.
	Quderah Adenan (Acting)	Independent	1965	1965	0 years	—	Transition	
	Asful Anwar (Acting)	Independent	1973	1974	0–1 years	—	Transition	
	Iskandar (Acting)	Independent	April 2005	12 Agustus 2005	0 years	—	Transition	
	Muhammad Thamrin (Acting)	Independent	13 August 2015	16 February 2016	0–1 years	—	Transition (2015–2016)	
	Hermansyah (Action Officer)	Independent	26 September 2020	5 December 2020	0 years	14 (2015)	Ibnu Sina	(Note: Replacing the incumbent mayor who is on campaign leave for the 2020 Banjarmasin mayoral election.)
	Mukhyar (Daily Executive)	Independent	17 February 2021	2 April 2021	0 years	—	Transition (2021)	
	Akhmad Fydayeen (Acting)	Independent	2 April 2021	23 June 2021	0 years	—	Transition (2021)	

== See also ==
- Banjarmasin
- List of incumbent regional heads and deputy regional heads in South Kalimantan
