= List of incumbent regional heads and deputy regional heads in South Kalimantan =

The following is an article about the list of Regional Heads and Deputy Regional Heads in 13 regencies/cities in South Kalimantan who are currently still serving.

== List ==
Regency/ City	Photo of the Regent/ Mayor	Regent/ Mayor	Photo of Deputy Regent/ Mayor	Deputy Regent/ Mayor	Taking Office	End of Office (Planned)	Ref.
Balangan; Regency List of Regents/Deputy Regents		Abdul Hadi		Akhmad Fauzi	20 February 2025	20 February 2030	
Banjar; Regency List of Regents/Deputy Regents		Saidi Mansyur		Said Idrus	20 February 2025	20 February 2030	
Barito Kuala; Regency List of Regents/Deputy Regents		Bahrul Ilmi		Herman Susilo	20 February 2025	20 February 2030	
South Hulu Sungai; Regency List of Regents/Deputy Regents		Syafrudin Noor		Suriani	20 February 2025	20 February 2030	
Central Hulu Sungai; Regency List of Regents/Deputy Regents		Samsul Rizal		Gusti Rosyadi Elmi	20 February 2025	20 February 2030	
North Hulu Sungai; Regency List of Regents/Deputy Regents		Sahrujani		Hero Setiawan	20 February 2025	20 February 2030	
Kotabaru; Regency List of Regents/Deputy Regents		Muhammad Rusli		Syairi Mukhlis	20 February 2025	20 February 2030	
Tabalong; Regency List of Regents/Deputy Regents		Muhammad Noor Rifani		Habib Muhammad Taufani Alkaf	20 February 2025	20 February 2030	
Tanah Bumbu; Regency List of Regents/Deputy Regents		Andi Rudi Latif		Bahsanuddin	20 February 2025	20 February 2030	
Tanah Laut; Regency List of Regents/Deputy Regents		Rahmat Trianto		Muhammad Zazuli	20 February 2025	20 February 2030	
Tapin; Regency List of Regents/Deputy Regents		Yamani		Juanda	20 February 2025	20 February 2030	
Banjarbaru; City List of Mayors/Deputy mayors		Erna Lisa Halaby		Wartono	21 June 2025	21 June 2030	
Banjarmasin; City List of Mayors/Deputy mayors		Muhammad Yamin		Ananda	20 February 2025	20 February 2030	

Notes

- "Commencement of office" is the inauguration date at the beginning or during the current term of office. For acting regents/mayors, it is the date of appointment or extension as acting regent/mayor.
- Based on the Constitutional Court decision Number 27/PUU-XXII/2024, the Governor and Deputy Governor, Regent and Deputy Regent, and Mayor and Deputy Mayor elected in 2020 shall serve until the inauguration of the Governor and Deputy Governor, Regent and Deputy Regent, and Mayor and Deputy Mayor elected in the 2024 national simultaneous elections as long as the term of office does not exceed 5 (five) years.

== See also ==
- South Kalimantan
