= Hasnur Group =

Indonesian coal mining company

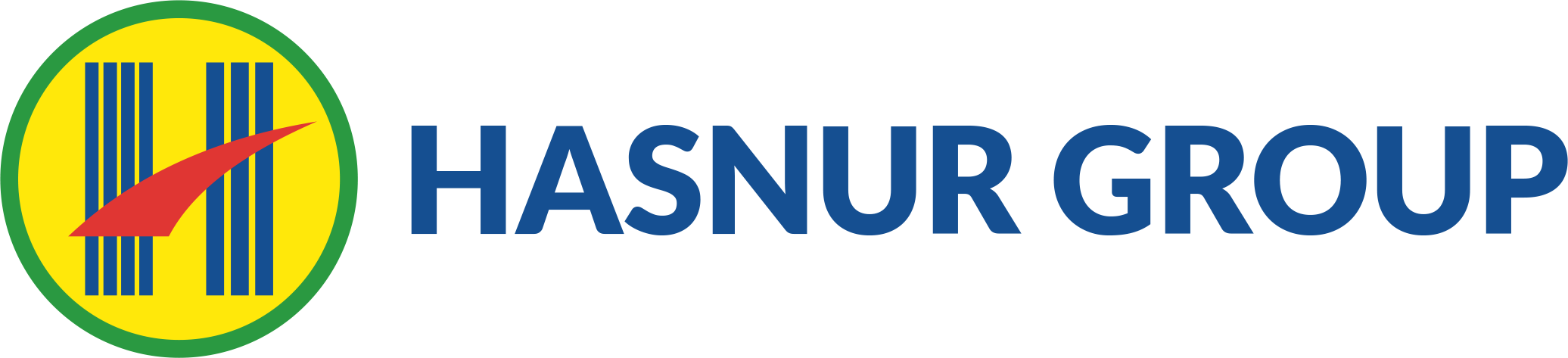
- Company type: Private
- Industry: Conglomerate
- Founded: 1966; 60 years ago
- Founder: Abdussamad Sulaiman HB
- Headquarters: Jakarta, Indonesia
- Key people: Hasnuryadi Sulaiman (Commissioner)
- Products: Forrestry; Mining; Media; Agribusiness; Services; Sports; Education
- Subsidiaries: PT Hasnur Jaya Utama; PT Barito Putera; PT Energi Batubara Lestari; PT Bhumi Rantau Energi; PT Hasnur Media Citra; PT Putera Barito Berbakti; PT Hasnur Citra Terpadu; PT Magma Sigma Utama; PT Hasnur Graha Jaya; PT Hasnur Informasi Teknologi; PT Hasnur Cipta Karya; Yayasan Hasnur Centre
- Website: https://www.hasnurgroup.com/

Hasnur Group is an Indonesian conglomerate headquartered in South Jakarta. It was founded by Abdussamad Sulaiman HB in 1966. It has interests in forestry, mining, media, services and an Indonesian professional football team, PS Barito Putera.

Hasnur does most of its business in South Kalimantan, where it is the largest company.
