= Mess L =

Building in North Banjarbaru, Indonesia

Dekranasda Creative Hub
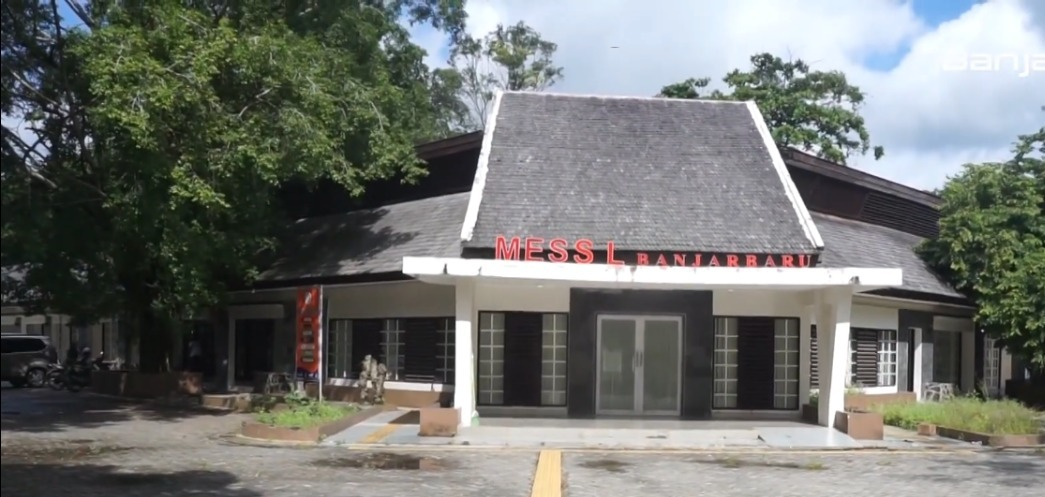
- Mess L after being renovated, December 2021
- Interactive map of the Dekranasda Creative Hub area
- Alternative names: Mess L

General information
- Location: Jl. Garuda, Komet subdistrict, North Banjarbaru, Banjarbaru, Indonesia
- Coordinates: 03°26′29″S 114°50′16″E

Mess L, officially known as Dekranasda Creative Hub, is a multipurpose building located in the city of Banjarbaru, Indonesia. Located in Komet subdistrict, North Banjarbaru district, it was formerly a building used by Soviet workers as homebase to assist development of steel industry in the then-newly built city. The Soviet workers left the city in 1965 due to transition to the New Order, resulting in cancelation of the project and abandonment of the building. The building was left crumbling down and overgrown by vegetation until 2017 when it was renovated and repurposed as a creative economy center and multipurpose building.

== History ==
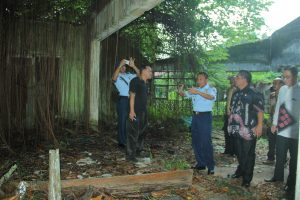
Mess L before renovation

Banjarbaru was a relatively new city built with the purpose of replacing Banjarmasin as the new capital of the then-single Kalimantan province to avoid frequent flooding. Sukarno, Indonesia's first president, wanted the city to be a new steel industry center in the region and requested assistance from the Soviet Union to develop the industry. The building, used as a homebase and housing for Soviet workers, was built around 1963. The plan was never realized due to a coup against Sukarno by Suharto and the start of the New Order, which was followed by a purge of communism.

The building was overgrown by vegetation and was seen by locals as a haunted place. In 2017, the building, which was an asset still owned by the Indonesian Air Force, was transferred to the city government and the building's renovation began. The construction started in 2018 and the renovation was finished in 2019. A small children's park and a stage for cultural performances was built in addition to the building's renovation. The building was used as a multipurpose building, and as the city's economic center of culture and creativity. Several exhibition events for small and medium enterprise products were held in the building. The building is also routinely used for cultural events and performances, and also contains a gallery for local artists from the city. The building is also a popular tourist spot for locals, especially for photos and selfies.

== Design ==
The building is L-shaped, hence the name, and the original shape was preserved despite massive renovation. The building consists of a main hall, a meeting hall, 12 rooms, and one open stage. The land, which the building occupies, is around 13,000 square meters. Only 6,987 square meters of the land is used and the total area of the actual building is 837 square meters. The building is mostly painted white and a small children's park is located in front of the building.
