= Komet Windpump =

Coordinates: 03°26′21.9″S 114°50′12.4″E

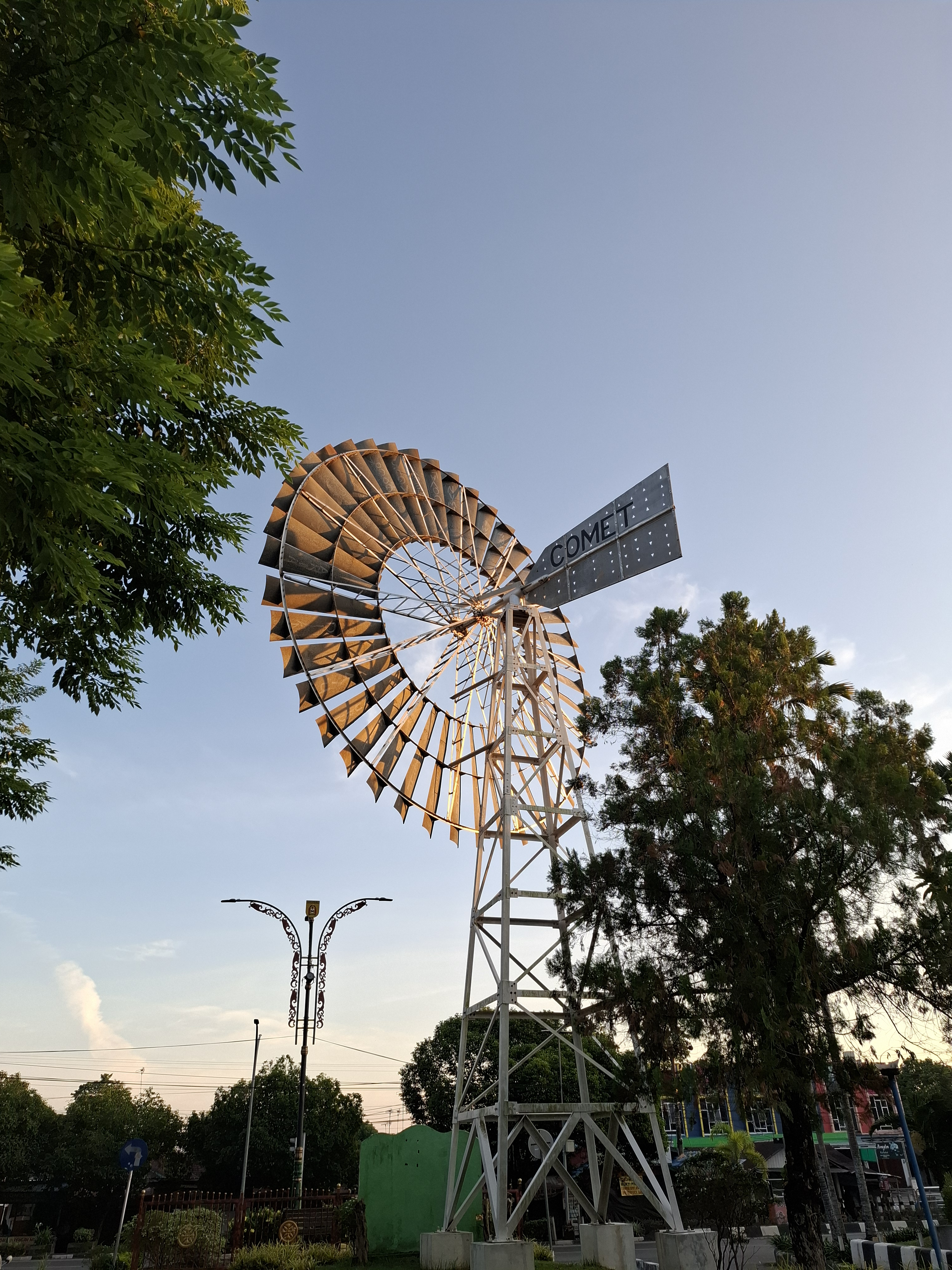
Komet Windpump, in 2024

Komet Windpump (Indonesian: Kincir Angin Komet) is a former windpump in Banjarbaru, Indonesia. Built in 1972, it is one of the oldest landmarks in the city. Although dismantled in 2008, the windpump was restored in late 2021 purely as a monument. As it has become a widely recognized symbol for the general public.

== History ==
The windpump was built in 1972, intended to pump water into storage for what was then a part of Banjar Regency. At the time, this area frequently experienced severe dry seasons. The pump was constructed by a Russian investor who worked on an iron mine project in the region. It was named "Komet", meaning comet, due to its shape. However, the windpump did not work well and was rarely used.

The windpump was among the first landmarks for the newly-established city of Banjarbaru. It quickly became a reference point for locals when telling people about the location of the city. As a result, the windpump become iconic as the city grew despite not functioning properly. The administrative subdistrict where the windpump was located was also given the name "Komet". However, the windpump lost its relevance with age and was scrapped in 2008, on the pretext of being hazardous to pedestrians and vehicles using the road around it. While most of the windpump parts were sold, some were bought by a historically-minded former member of the city legislature, and saved until the restoration in 2021.

== Restoration ==
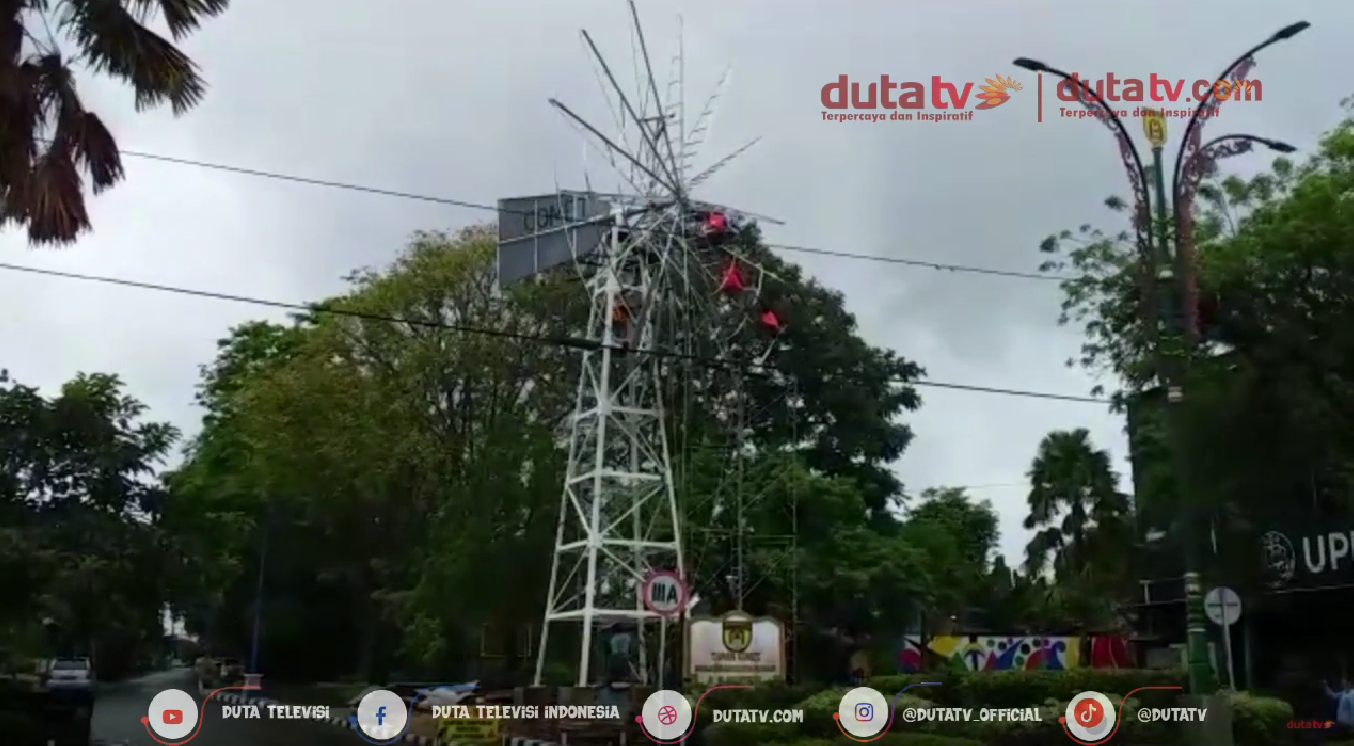
Restored windpump and surrounding park under construction

In October 2021, the city government announced a plan to restore the windpump, citing its historical significance. The construction of the new windpump cost around 198 million rupiahs and was expected to finish in 2022. However, the construction took less time than expected, finishing on 16 December 2021. The windpump was inaugurated by the mayor of the city, Aditya Mufti Arifin, on 24 December 2021. The restored windpump features a surrounding urban garden as well as LED lighting illuminating the structure. It is intended as a monument only, and does not function as a water pump anymore.
