= Lambung Mangkurat Museum =

Museum in Banjarbaru, South Kalimantan, Indonesia

Coordinates: 3.4421177°S 114.8381567°E

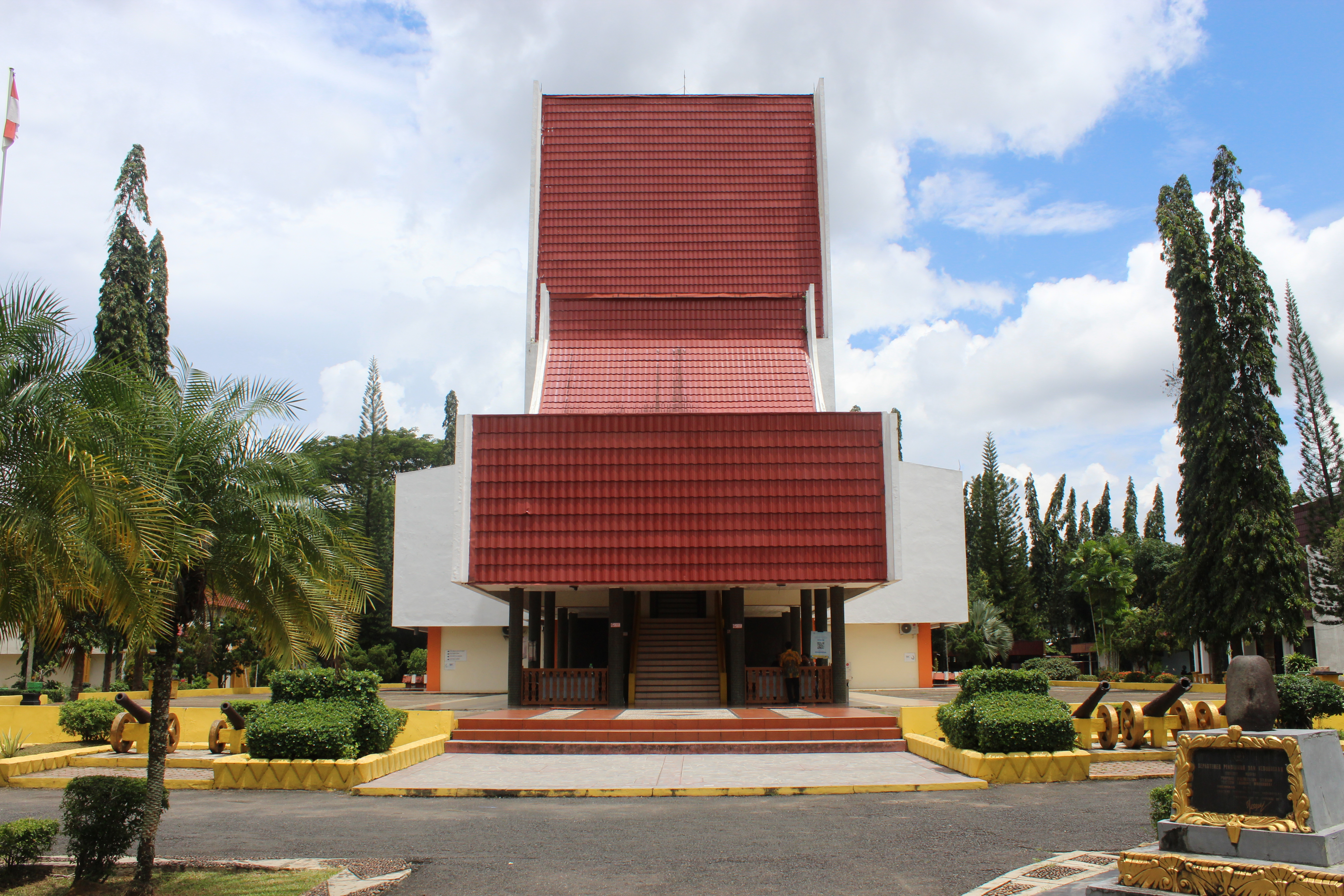
- Lambung Mangkurat Museum in Banjarbaru, South Kalimantan
- Established: Januari 10, 1979
- Location: Jl. Jend. Ahmad Yani Km. 36, Banjarbaru Utara, Banjarbaru, South Kalimantan , Indonesia
- Type: Ethnology museum
- Website: muslam.kalselprov.go.id

Lambung Mangkurat Museum is a museum in Banjarbaru, South Kalimantan, Indonesia. The museum has a notable collection of artifacts related to the Banjar and Dayak peoples, with many items being excavated from archaeological sites all around Kalimantan. It is also home to an array of ancient Hindu objects.
