= Muhidin =

Indonesian politician (born 1958)

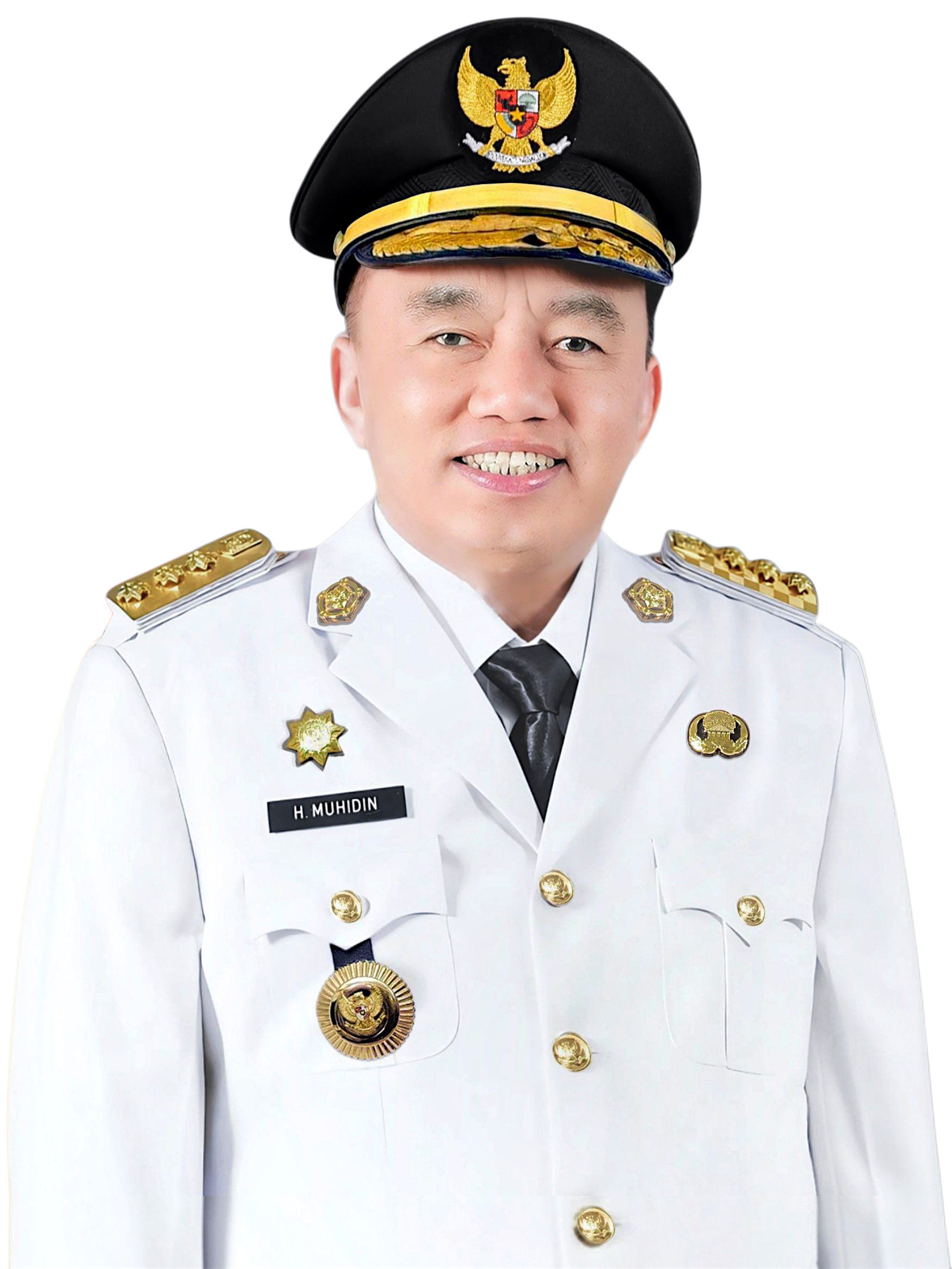

Governor of South Kalimantan
- Incumbent
- Assumed office 16 December 2024 (Acting: 24 November – 16 December 2024)
- President: Prabowo Subianto
- Deputy: Hasnuryadi Sulaiman
- Preceded by: Sahbirin Noor; Roy Rizali Anwar (act.)

Vice Governor of South Kalimantan
- In office 25 August 2021 – 16 December 2024
- President: Joko Widodo; Prabowo Subianto
- Governor: Sahbirin Noor
- Preceded by: Rudy Resnawan
- Succeeded by: Hasnuryadi Sulaiman

Mayor of Banjarmasin
- In office 12 August 2010 – 12 August 2015
- Deputy: Irwan Anshari
- Preceded by: Yudhi Wahyuni
- Succeeded by: Ibnu Sina

Personal details
- Born: 6 May 1958 (age 68) Tapin Regency, South Kalimantan, Indonesia
- Party: PAN (2010–presents)
- Other political affiliations: PBR (2002–2010)
- Spouse: Fathul Jannah
- Children: 4
- Occupation: Politician

Muhidin (born 6 May 1958) is an Indonesian politician from PAN, who currently serves as Governor of South Kalimantan since December 16, 2024. Previously, he was Vice Governor of South Kalimantan for the 2021–2024 period and Mayor of Banjarmasin for the 2010–2015 period.

== Early life ==
Muhidin was born on 6 May 1958 in Binuang, Tapin Regency, South Kalimantan.

== Career ==
He served as a member of the Regional People's Representative Council of Tapin Regency representing the Partai Bintang Reformasi from 2004 to 2009. After that term ended, he served as a member of the Regional People's Representative Council of South Kalimantan Province (DPRD South Kalimantan) from 2009 to 2014 with the same party. Before the end of that term, he resigned and served as the Mayor of Banjarmasin for the 2010–2015 period alongside Irwan Anshari.

In 2015, he ran for Governor of South Kalimantan together with Gusti Farid Hasan Aman as independent candidates. They lost to candidate pair number 2, Sahbirin Noor and Rudy Resnawan, who secured 41.06 percent (732,320 votes), while Muhidin obtained 40.38 percent (720,248 votes). Both totals surpassed the pair Zairullah Azhar and H. M. Safi`i, who obtained 18.56 percent (330,970 votes).

In 2018, Muhidin served as Chairman of the Regional Leadership Board (DPW) of the National Mandate Party (PAN) for South Kalimantan. He was reportedly facing removal after declaring support for the Joko Widodo–Ma'ruf Amin ticket in the 2019 Indonesian presidential election. He was re-elected to the same position for the 2020–2025 period in 2021.

He ran in the 2020 South Kalimantan gubernatorial election as candidate for Vice Governor running with Sahbirin Noor. According to the State Officials’ Wealth Report (LHKPN), he was the wealthiest candidate in that election. They defeated their opponents with 871,123 votes, beating the pair Denny Indrayana and Difriadi Darjat who obtained a total of 831,178 votes. During his campaign leave, he was replaced by Roy Rizali Anwar who served temporarily as Acting Governor of South Kalimantan from 13 November 2024 to 23 November 2024. On 13 November 2024 he replaced Sahbirin, who had resigned as acting governor, and was later declared definitive governor on 16 December 2024.

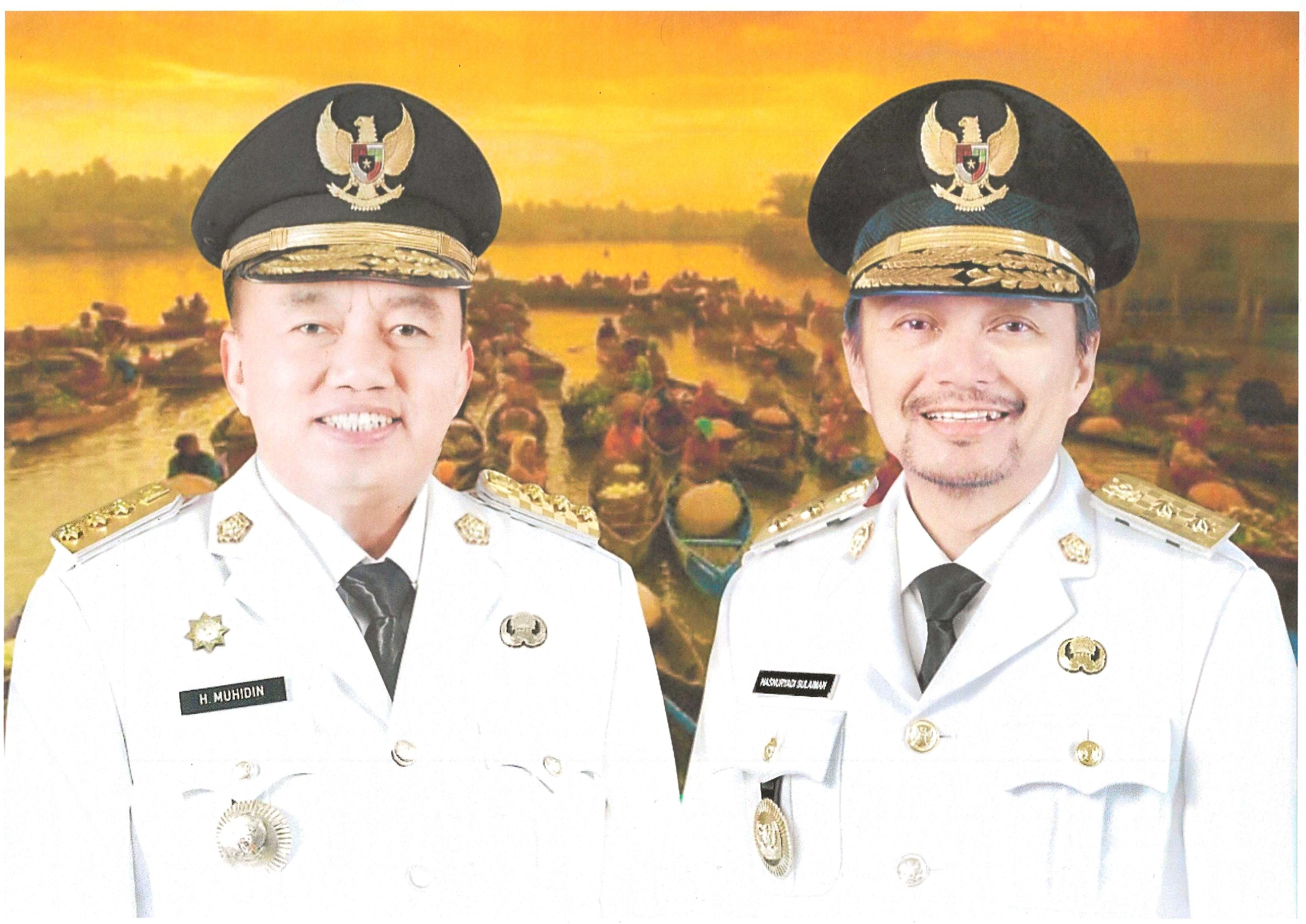
Governor Muhidin and Hasnuryadi Sulaiman, 2025

Later, he ran in the 2024 South Kalimantan gubernatorial election together with Hasnuryadi Sulaiman. They were supported by the National Mandate Party (PAN), the PKS, the Democrat Party, the Perindo, and the PSI. The pair won the election with 82.4 percent of the vote, defeating Raudhatul Jannah and Akhmad Rozanie who obtained 17.6 percent. He was inaugurated on 20 February 2025 for the 2025–2030 term.

== Controversies ==
On 1 September 2010, Muhidin was implicated in allegations of gratification to Ardiansyah, Regent of Tanah Laut, intended to facilitate the granting of mining permits for his company, PT Binuang Jaya Mulia. Muhidin ultimately received a Police Order to Stop Investigation (SP3) on 22 July 2014. He was also examined as a witness in a case concerning alleged misappropriation of assistance funds by 55 members of the South Kalimantan DPRD for the 2009–2010 period; ultimately, Suyono, a former DPRD member, was named a suspect.

According to Mongabay, he and Haji Ijai held mining business licenses in the Banua Anam area and in the Tapin, Hulu Sungai Selatan, Hulu Sungai Tengah, Hulu Sungai Utara, Balangan, and Tabalong regencies.
