= Banjarmasin City Regional House of Representatives =

Banjarmasin City Regional House of Representatives Dewan Perwakilan Rakyat Daerah Kota Banjarmasin
- 2024–2029 period

Type
- Type: Unicameral

History
- Founded: 1959
- New session started: 9 September 2024

Leadership
- Speaker: Rikval Fachruri, Golkar since 30 September 2024
- Deputy Speaker: H. Harry Wijaya, S.H., M.H., PAN since 30 September 2024
- Deputy Speaker: H. Mathari, S.Ag., M.I.Kom., PKS since 30 September 2024
- Deputy Speaker: Muhammad Isnaini, S.E., M.M., Gerindra since 30 September 2024

Structure
- Seats: 45
- Political groups: PKB (5) Gerindra (6) PDI-P (5) Golkar (7) NasDem (2) PKS (7) PAN (7) Democratic (5) PPP (1)
- Length of term: 5 years

Elections
- Voting system: Open list proportional representation
- Last election: 14 February 2024

Meeting place
- Banjarmasin City Regional House of Representatives Building; Lambung Mangkurat Street Number 2 Kertak Baru Ilir, Banjarmasin Tengah, Banjarmasin; South Kalimantan, Indonesia

Website
- dprd.banjarmasinkota.go.id

The Banjarmasin City Regional House of Representatives (Indonesian: Dewan Perwakilan Rakyat Daerah Kota Banjarmasin, DPRD Kota Banjarmasin) is the unicameral municipal legislature of Banjarmasin, South Kalimantan, Indonesia. It has 45 members, who are elected every five years, simultaneously with the national legislative election.

== Legal basis ==
The legislature for Banjarmasin was formed along with those of other cities in East Java under Law Number 27 of 1959, which organized city governments within the province.

== General election results ==
=== 2024 Indonesian legislative election ===
The official valid votes received by political parties contesting the 2024 Indonesian legislative election in each electoral district (constituency) for members of the Banjarmasin City Regional House of Representatives are as follows.

2024 Indonesian legislative election results

Electoral district	PKB	Gerindra	PDI-P	Golkar	NasDem	Labour	Gelora	PKS	PKN	Hanura	Garuda	PAN	PBB	Democratic	PSI	Perindo	PPP	Ummat	Valid votes
Banjarmasin City 1	3,672	3,981	3,987	5,917	3,523	222	319	4,183	122	103	94	7,617	291	7,113	1,374	210	1,902	2,440	47,070
Banjarmasin City 2	8,212	10,235	6,616	8,867	4,726	754	3,126	10,560	124	195	162	12,606	1,018	6,620	1,463	207	1,740	3,013	80,244
Banjarmasin City 3	6,027	5,536	7,557	12,035	6,447	277	717	6,430	38	88	99	6,947	502	6,241	1,730	509	1,864	987	64,031
Banjarmasin City 4	10,368	9,073	6,210	13,708	2,496	830	1,675	10,418	42	129	129	15,317	467	9,178	1,107	320	1,744	1,953	85,164
Banjarmasin City 5	7,565	7,782	10,748	13,446	2,193	456	721	6,545	770	85	138	9,411	662	4,765	1,451	404	4,343	1,161	72,646
Total	35,844	36,607	35,118	53,973	19,385	2,539	6,558	38,136	1,096	600	622	51,898	2,940	33,917	7,125	1,650	11,593	9,554	349,155
Source: General Elections Commission of Indonesia

== Composition ==
The following is the composition of members of the Banjarmasin City Regional House of Representatives in the last three periods.

Party	Term of period		
Party	2014–2019	2019–2024	2024–2029
PKB seats	6	▼5	5
Gerindra seats	3	▲6	6
PDI-P seats	5	5	5
Golkar seats	8	▼6	▲7
NasDem seats	1	1	▲2
PKS seats	4	▲5	▲7
Hanura seats	3	▼0	0
PAN seats	4	▲9	▼7
PBB seats	1	1	▼0
Democratic seats	5	5	5
PPP seats	5	▼2	▼1
Total Seats	45	45	45
Total Party	11	▼10	▼9

== Electoral District ==
In the 2019 Legislative Election and the 2024 Legislative Election, the Banjarmasin City Regional House of Representatives election was divided into 5 electoral districts as follows:

Electoral District Name	Electoral District Area	Number of Seats (2019)	Number of Seats (2024)
BANJARMASIN CITY 1	Banjarmasin Tengah	6	6
BANJARMASIN CITY 2	Banjarmasin Utara	10	▲11
BANJARMASIN CITY 3	Banjarmasin Timur	8	8
BANJARMASIN CITY 4	Banjarmasin Selatan	11	11
BANJARMASIN CITY 5	Banjarmasin Barat	10	▼9
TOTAL		45	45

== See also ==
- South Kalimantan Regional House of Representatives
- Banjarmasin
- South Kalimantan
