= Banjarbaru =

Capital city of South Kalimantan, Indonesia

- City
- City of Banjarbaru; Kota Banjarbaru
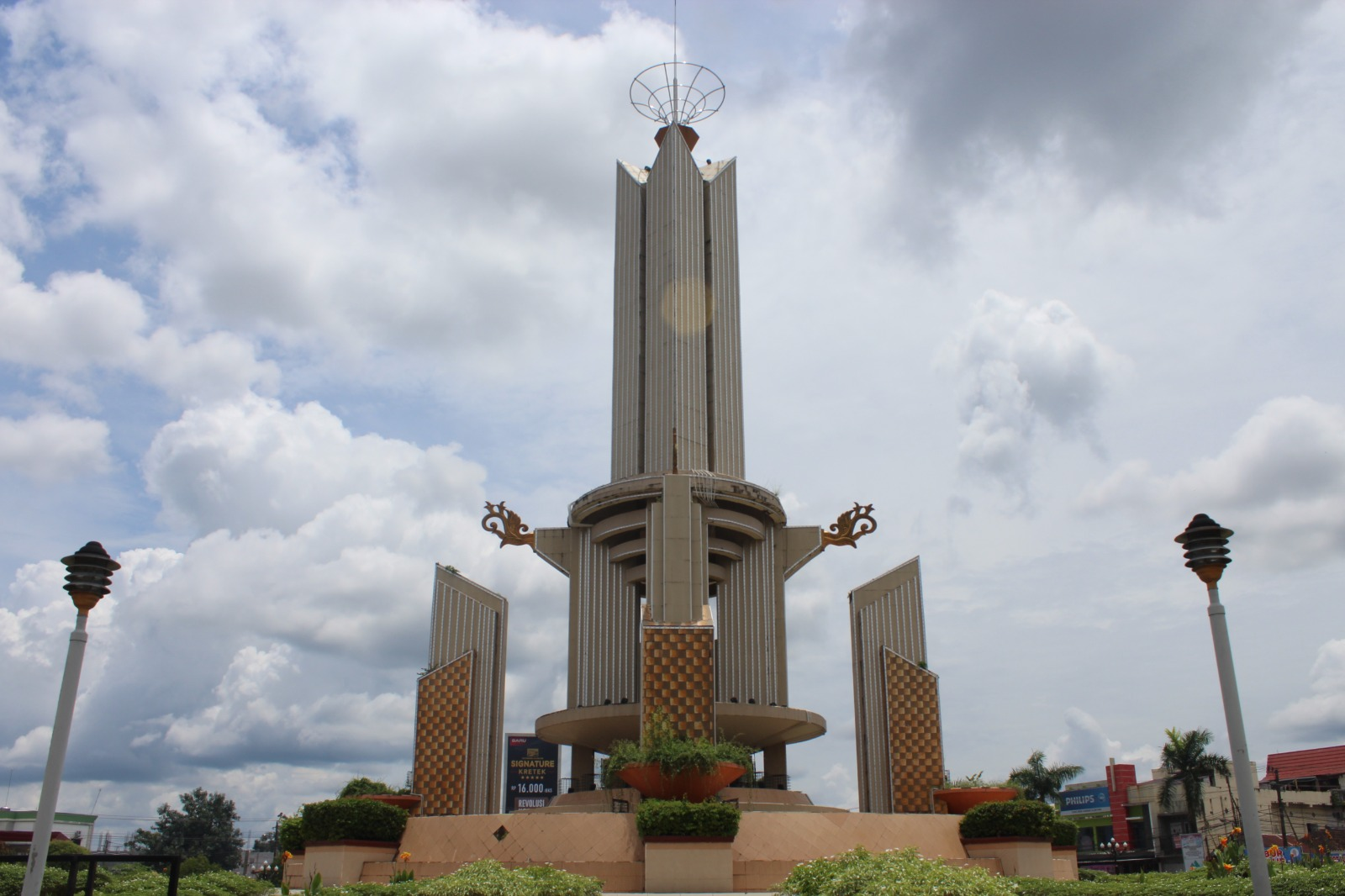
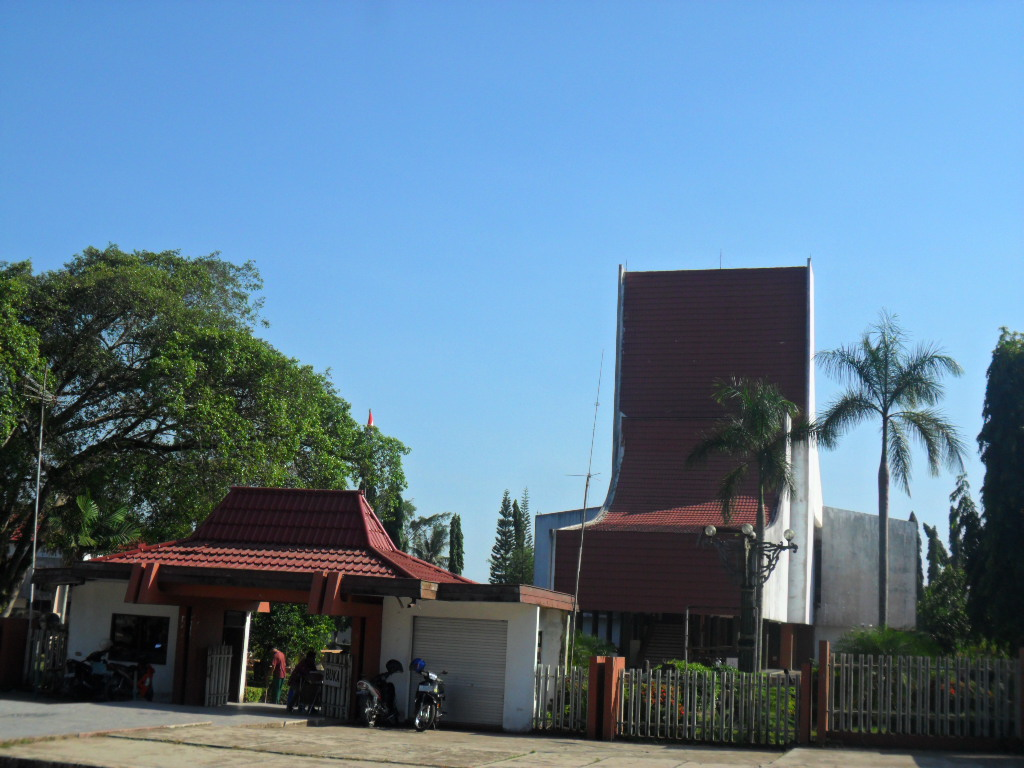
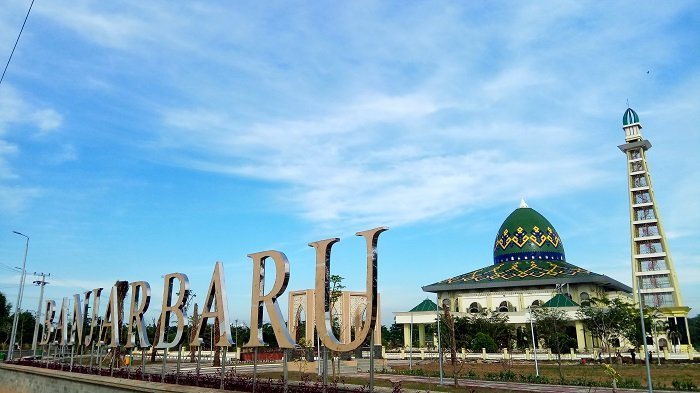
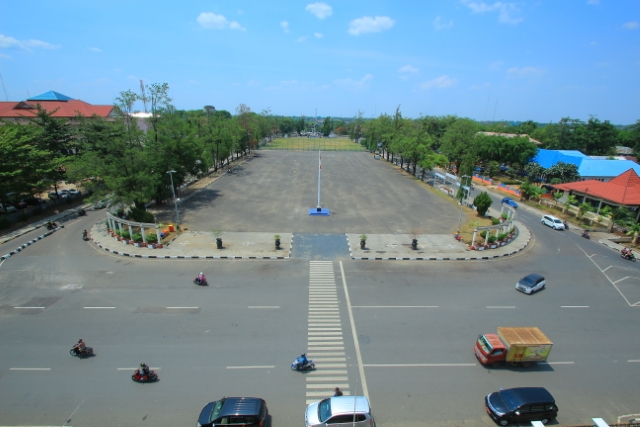
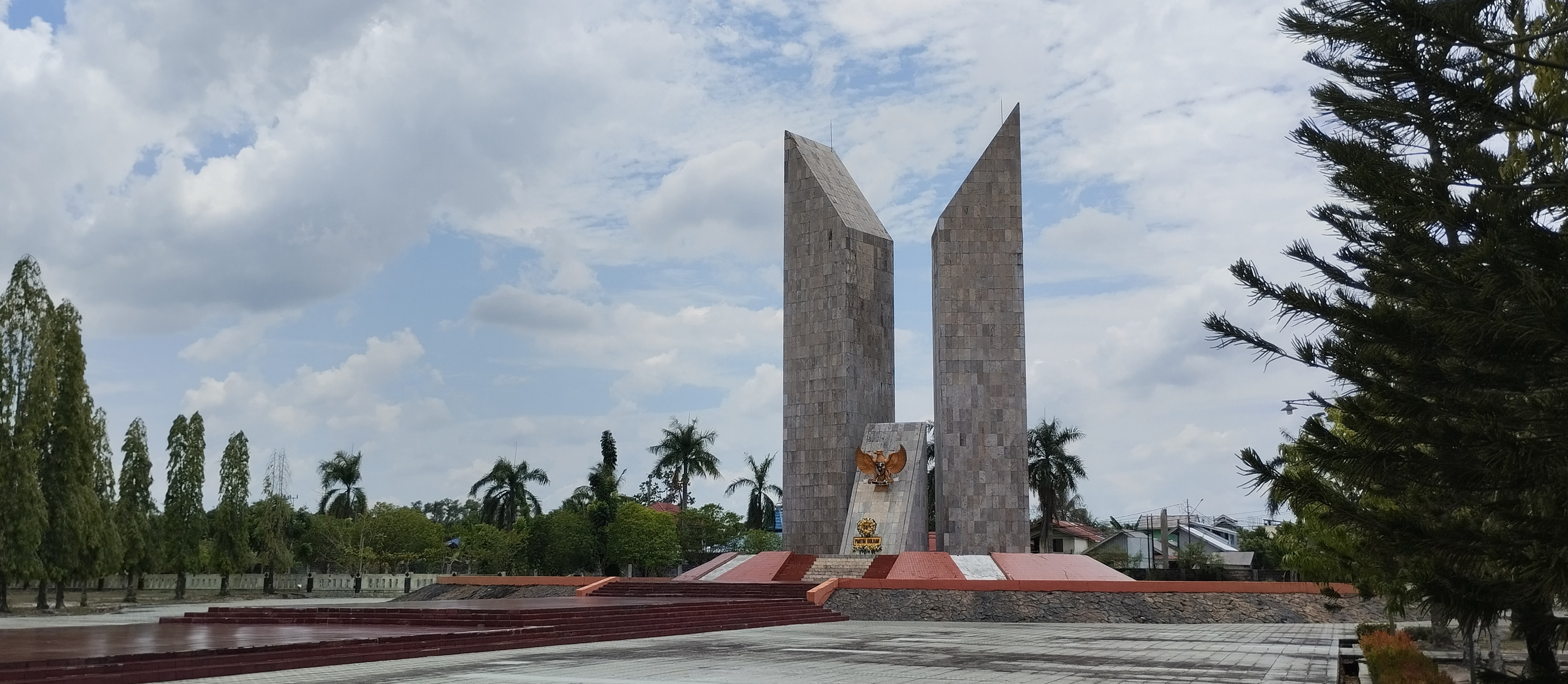
- Clockwise, from top: Welcome Monument, Al Munawarah Grand Mosque, Dr. Murdiani Field, Lambung Mangkurat Museum, Bumi Kencana Heroes cemetery

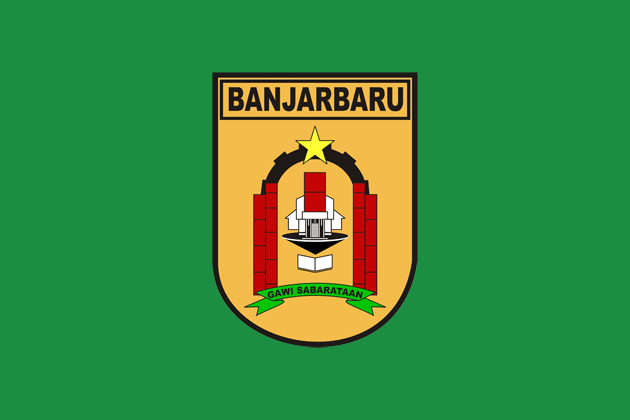
- Flag Coat of arms
- Nickname: Kota Bukit (City of Hills)
- Motto: Gawi Sabarataan (Working together as a whole)
- Location within the Province of South Kalimantan
- Interactive map of Banjarbaru
- Location within Kalimantan Location within Indonesia
- Coordinates: 03°26′33″S 114°49′57″E
- Country: Indonesia
- Province: South Kalimantan
- Metropolitan area: Banjarbakula

Government
  - Mayor: Erna Lisa Halaby
  - Vice Mayor: Wartono
  - Legislature: Banjarbaru City Regional House of Representatives (DPRD)

Area
  - Total: 305.15 km^{2} (117.82 sq mi)
- Elevation: 23 m (75 ft)

Population (mid 2025 estimate)
  - Total: 293,332
  - Density: 961.27/km^{2} (2,489.7/sq mi)
- Time zone: UTC+8 (WITA)
- Area code: (+62) 511
- HDI (2024): ▲0.816 (Very High)
- Website: banjarbarukota.go.id

Banjarbaru is the capital city of South Kalimantan, one of the provinces in Indonesia. It is located 35 km (22 mi) southeast of Banjarmasin, the largest city of the province. The city had a population of 199,627 as of the 2010 Census, and 253,442 at the 2020 Census, and the official population estimate as at mid 2025 was 293,332 (comprising 147,053 males and 146,279 females). The large town of Martapura, with 161,290 inhabitants in 2025 (in Martapura and Martapura Timur Districts), lies immediately to the north of Banjarbaru in Banjar Regency, and in effect constitutes an extension of the city. The second largest city in the province after Banjarmasin, it is also part of Banjarbakula metropolitan area.

== History ==
=== Etymology ===
Banjarbaru was previously only a temporary name used by governor Dr. Murdjani to differentiate it from Banjarmasin, as "baru" means "new" in Indonesian. However, the name stuck among people living there and gradually became the official name of the city. The area which became Banjarbaru previously consisted of a series of hills known as Mount Apam.

=== Early history ===
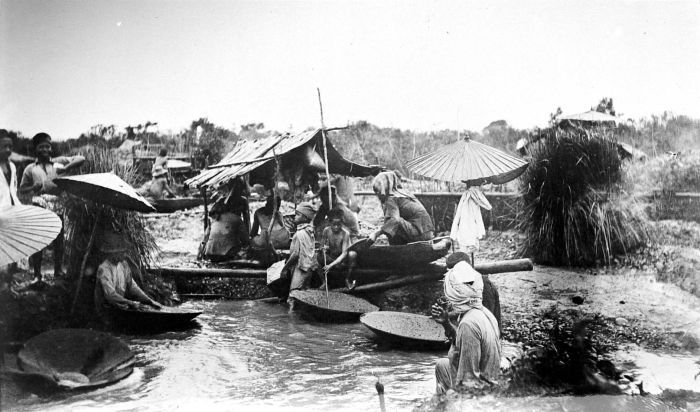
Diamond mining in Cempaka during colonial era

Diamond mines in Cempaka have existed since the 15th century under the Hindu-Buddhist kingdom Negara Dipa. In the era of the Banjar Sultanate, there was a royal edict stating that diamonds of four carats or higher should be sold only to the sultan. The place was mostly uninhabited except for resting places of diamond mine laborers from Cempaka, now also part of the city. Cempaka diamond mines under the colonial era were regulated under Ordonantie 25 Nopember 1923 Staatblast 1923 No. 174 together with Pelaihari and Martapura.

=== After independence ===
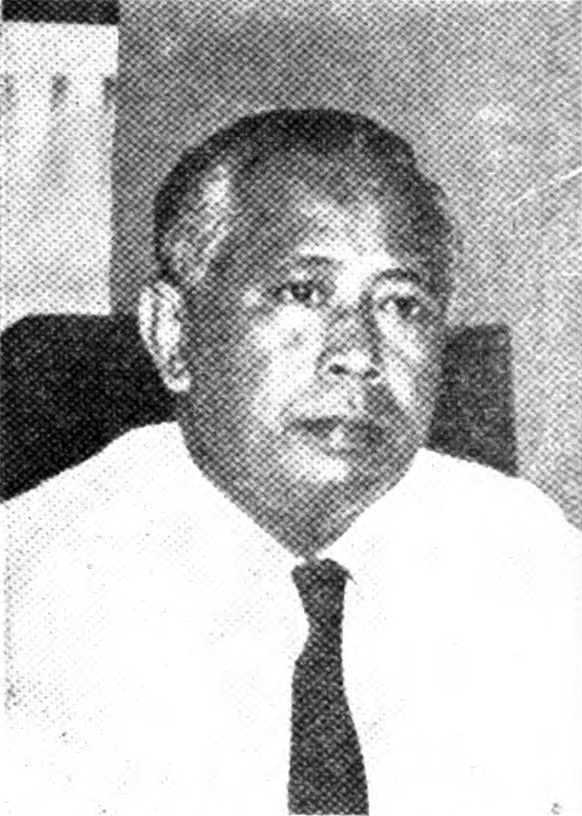
Dr. Murdjani, 3rd governor of Kalimantan province

In the 1950s, because of frequent floods that disrupted government activities in Banjarmasin, it was suggested to relocate the capital of what was then a single Kalimantan province to a new city. The construction and city planning was assisted by a Dutch-descendant architect named D.A.W. Van der Pijl based on the European city concept, which explains the abundance of city parks and a city hall in the center of the city. However, the plan to relocate the provincial government was never realized fully. As of April 2021, only the South Kalimantan governor's office has been relocated, while the parliament is still in Banjarmasin.

The city was previously intended by Sukarno to be new center of the steel industry in Kalimantan with assistance from the Soviet Union to develop it. Cooperation between the two was formalized on 11 September 1956. However, the plan to construct steel factories was never realized until after the 30 September Movement and subsequent purge of communism in Indonesia. Traces of Soviet projects can be seen in the city such as with Mess L.

On 20 April 1999, Banjarbaru was separated from Banjar Regency (of which it had previously been a part) and gained the status of an independent city, although it was still recognized as part of the Banjarbakula metropolitan area. The city legally became capital of the South Kalimantan province on 15 February 2022 following updates of laws concerning the legal basis of several provinces, which were passed by the People's Representative Council.

== Geography ==
Banjarbaru is located at the foot of the Meratus Mountains, with 80% of the city area elevated between 0 and 25 m (82 ft) above sea level, but it also includes areas up to 500 m (1,600 ft) high. In the North, East, and West it borders Banjar Regency, while in the South it borders Tanah Laut Regency. Podzol dominates the city soil, with a concentration of as much as 63.82%. However, Landasan Ulin District's soil is instead dominated by peat and alluvium.

Compared to other regencies and cities in the province, Banjarbaru is also the second smallest second-level administrative division in the province after Banjarmasin city, covering around 0.88% of province territory.

=== Climate ===
Banjarbaru has a tropical rainforest climate (Af according to the Köppen classification) with significant rainfall in all months, although June to October is comparatively drier and August nearly dry enough for tropical monsoon (Am) classification. Banjarbaru receives 2,627 millimetres (103.4 in) of rain annually. Temperatures are uniform in all months due to its equatorial location, with the average annual temperature being 27.2 °C (81.0 °F). On 16 August 1997, Banjarbaru recorded a temperature of 40.6 °C (105.1 °F), which is the highest temperature that has ever been recorded in Indonesia.

Climate data for Banjarbaru (Syamsudin Noor Airport) (1991–2020 normals)
Month	Jan	Feb	Mar	Apr	May	Jun	Jul	Aug	Sep	Oct	Nov	Dec	Year
Mean daily maximum °C (°F)	31.3 (88.3)	31.7 (89.1)	32.0 (89.6)	32.4 (90.3)	32.9 (91.2)	32.1 (89.8)	32.0 (89.6)	33.1 (91.6)	33.7 (92.7)	33.9 (93.0)	32.7 (90.9)	31.7 (89.1)	32.5 (90.4)
Daily mean °C (°F)	26.9 (80.4)	27.0 (80.6)	27.3 (81.1)	27.6 (81.7)	27.8 (82.0)	27.2 (81.0)	26.8 (80.2)	27.1 (80.8)	27.6 (81.7)	27.7 (81.9)	27.4 (81.3)	26.9 (80.4)	27.3 (81.1)
Mean daily minimum °C (°F)	24.1 (75.4)	24.3 (75.7)	24.4 (75.9)	24.6 (76.3)	24.7 (76.5)	23.9 (75.0)	23.2 (73.8)	23.0 (73.4)	23.1 (73.6)	23.7 (74.7)	24.1 (75.4)	24.0 (75.2)	23.9 (75.1)
Average rainfall mm (inches)	377.8 (14.87)	296.0 (11.65)	309.0 (12.17)	273.4 (10.76)	187.9 (7.40)	157.0 (6.18)	101.2 (3.98)	66.6 (2.62)	82.1 (3.23)	142.7 (5.62)	250.1 (9.85)	395.0 (15.55)	2,638.8 (103.89)
Average rainy days (≥ 1.0 mm)	21.5	17.8	18.4	17.3	14.7	13.2	11.1	8.7	7.7	12.4	16.9	22.1	181.8
Mean monthly sunshine hours	101.9	92.0	122.4	137.2	154.8	140.4	158.8	176.3	160.1	150.3	124.1	99.4	1,617.7
Source 1: Starlings Roost Weather
Source 2: World Meteorological Organization

== Demographics ==
Around 94% of the city population are Muslim, 4.6% are Christian, 0.21% Hindu, and 0.16% Buddhist. There were 147,053 males and 146,279 females in the city as of mid 2025, with a sex ratio of 100 females to 100.53 males. South Banjarbaru is the most densely populated district with 3,374 people per square kilometre in mid 2025 and Cempaka is the least densely populated district with 353 people per square kilometre.

The city population is dominated by young adults with an age range of 20 to 39 years old. The population of working or reproductive age (15 – 64 years old) makes just over 70% of the city's population as of 2024. Life expectancy of the city is 71.87 years as of 2019, which is slightly above the national figure and significantly higher than the provincial figure.

== Economy ==
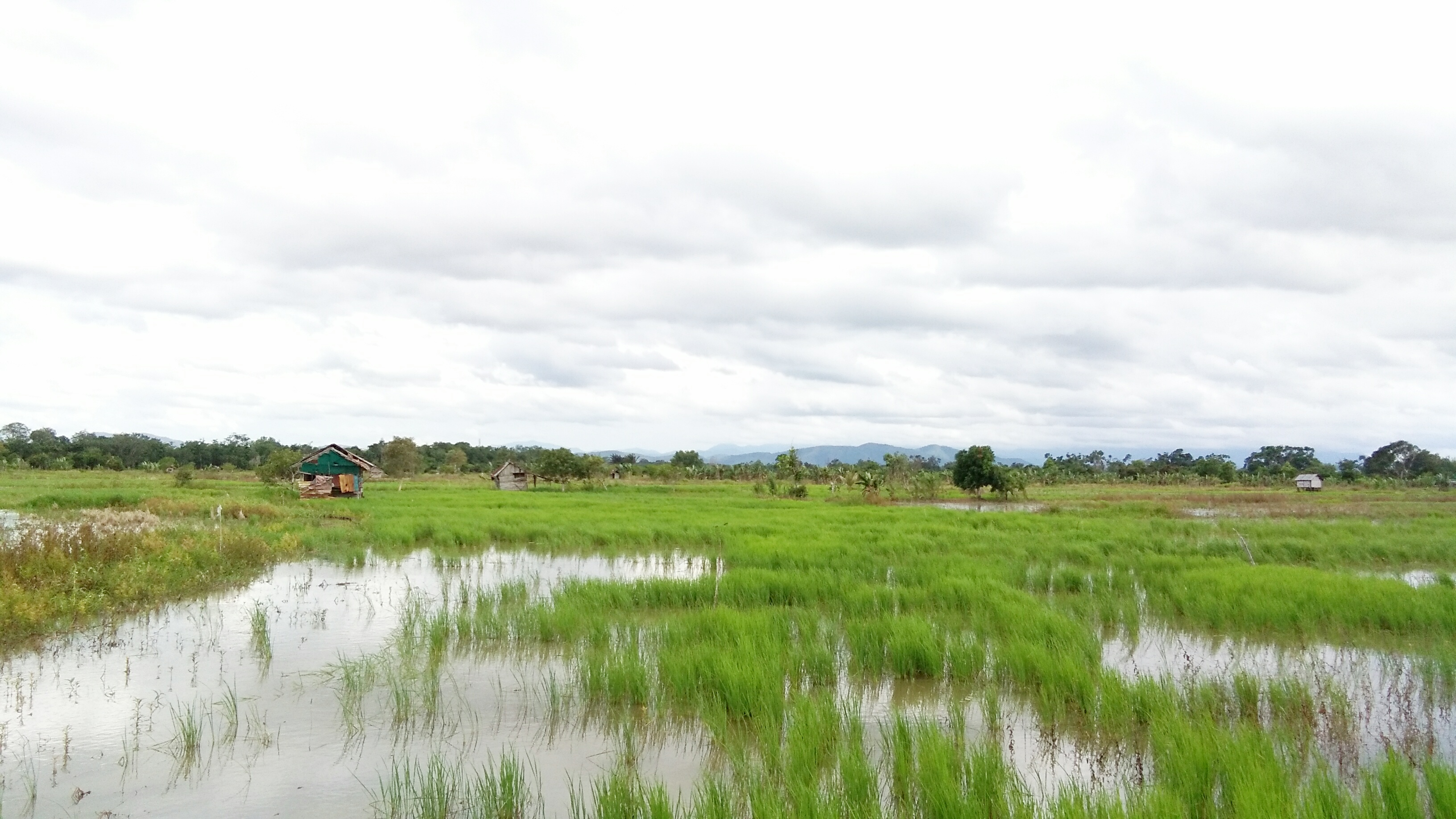
Paddy field in Cempaka. Cempaka is the only district in Banjarbaru that relies on agriculture.

Economic growth in 2019 was 7%, which is above the national average. The service sector dominated the city's economy at around 23.47% in 2011. Other big sectors include restaurant & hotel and construction, accounting for 18.70% and 18.33% respectively. In 2013, the service sector alone employed 26,533 people from the city. Other sectors such as processing (12.06%), communication (7.95%) and banking (4.01%) also exist in the city. The creative economy and tourism only employed around 500 people in 2020.

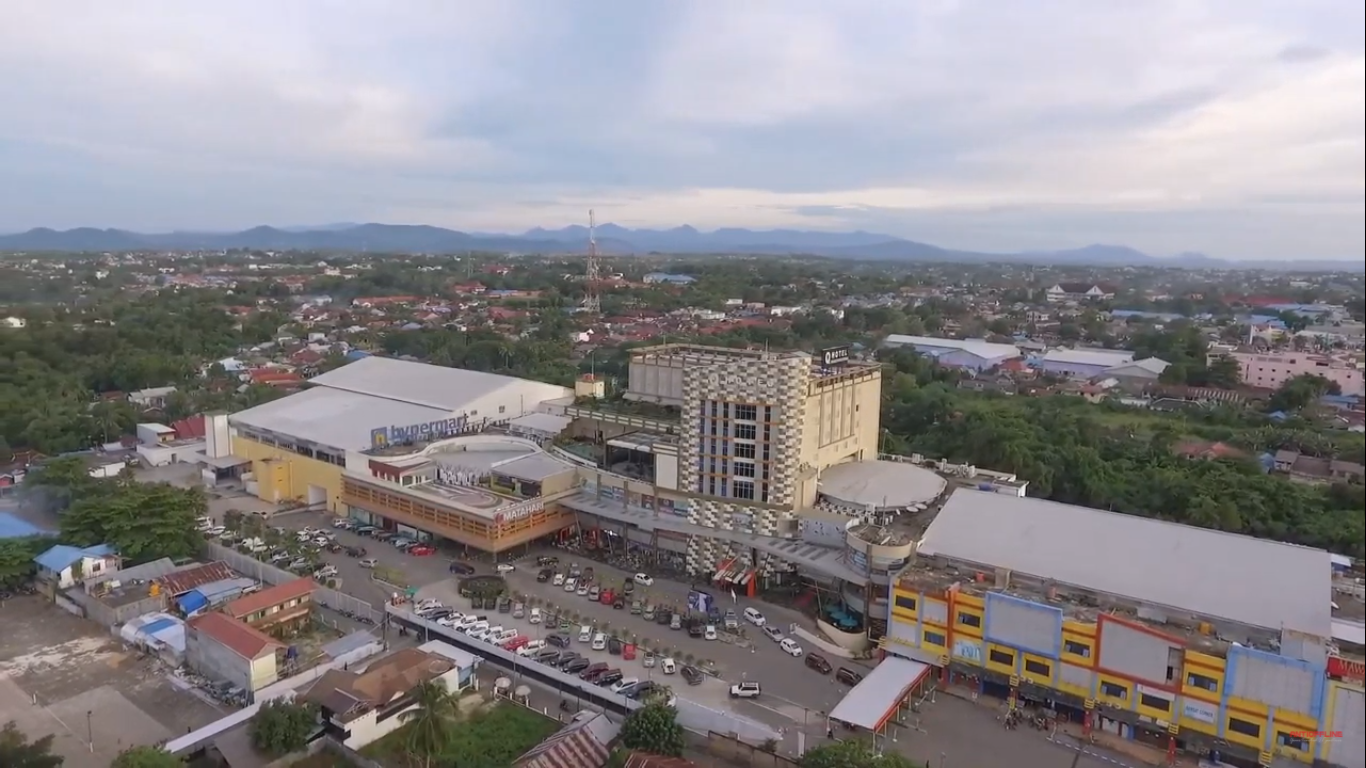
Aerial view of Banjarbaru

Cempaka District's economy is the only one that relies on mining (mainly diamond) and the agriculture sector. The diamond mining industry is plagued by free riders. According to Media Indonesia, in 2011 there were 200 miner groups, consisting of around 1,000 diamond miners in 4 urban villages (kelurahan), both with modern means of mining diamonds with water pumps or traditional methods. The diamond mining industry in Cempaka occupies around 2,000 hectares of area in the district. The city authority faced difficulty in collecting taxes from the mining industry because of its informal nature and the fact that most diamond transactions happened in secrecy. This, combined with the general decline of mining industry investment, made mining only account for around 8.12% of the city's gross regional product in 2011. The agriculture sector is also shrinking and contributes little to the city's economy, with the figure 4.51% in 2011. The amount of paddy fields in the city is small, only 4,522 hectares cultivated in 2010. The young and educated demographic that are not interested in the mining or agriculture sector combined with city's lack of natural resources compared to neighboring regions made both sectors shrink in size. The unemployment rate is 5.06% as of 2019.

== Governance ==
=== Administrative division ===
Banjarbaru is divided into five districts (kecamatan): Banjarbaru Utara (North Banjarbaru), Banjarbaru Selatan (South Banjarbaru), Cempaka, Landasan Ulin and Liang Anggang, as set out below with their areas and their populations at the 2010, and 2020 censuses, together with the official estimates as at mid 2025. Each district is divided into 4 urban villages (kelurahan). The table also includes the post codes of each district.

Kode Wilayah	Name of District (kecamatan)	Area in km^{2}	Pop'n Census 2010	Pop'n Census 2020	Pop'n Estimate mid 2025	Admin centre	No. of kelurahan	Post codes
63.72.02	Landasan Ulin	74.03	51,510	75,385	87,529	Landasan Ulin Timur	4	70724 ^{(a)}
63.72.06	Liang Anggang	74.74	34,548	44,358	53,889	Landasan Ulin Barat	4	70724 ^{(b)}
63.72.03	Cempaka	114.53	28,319	35,584	40,400	Sungai Tiung	4	70731: 70734
63.72.04	Banjarbaru Utara	26.84	42,805	52,842	60,880	Komet	4	70714
63.72.05	Banjarbaru Selatan	15.01	42,445	45,273	50,634	Loktabat Selatan	4	70714 ^{(c)}
	Totals	305.15	199,627	253,442	293,332		20	

Notes: (a) except Guntung Payung kelurahan, with a postcode of 70721. (b) except Landasan Ulin Barat kelurahan, with a postcode of 70722, and Landasan Ulin Tengah kelurahan, with a postcode of 70723. (c) except Guntung Palkat kelurahan, with a postcode of 70713.

=== Local government ===
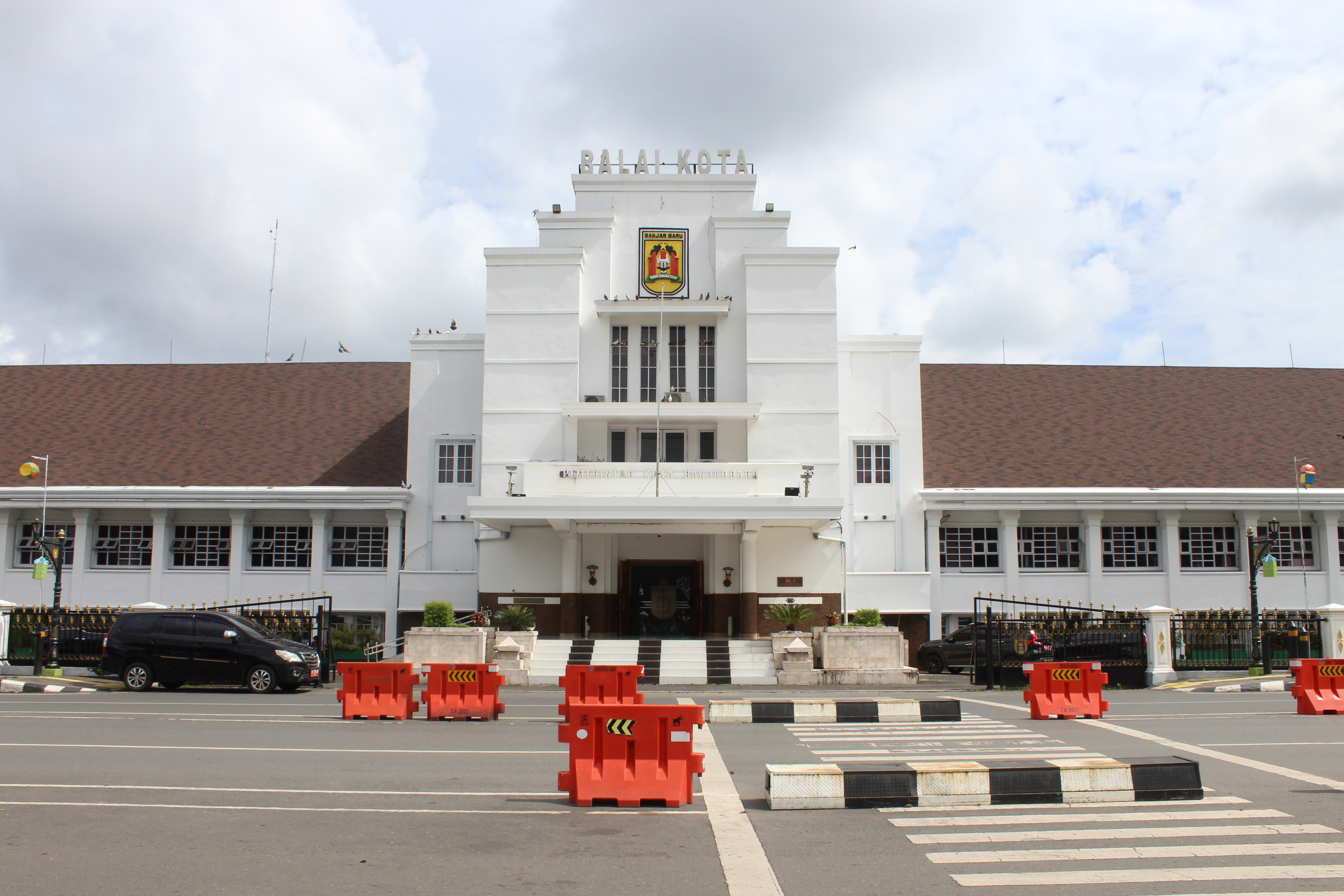
Banjarbaru city hall, across Dr. Murdjani field

As with all of Indonesian cities, the local government is a second-level administrative division run by a mayor and vice mayor together with the city parliament, and it is equivalent to regency. Executive power lies in the mayor and vice mayor, while legislation duties are carried by local parliament. Mayor, vice mayor, and parliament members are democratically elected by people of the city in an election. Meanwhile, head of districts are appointed directly by city mayor with recommendation by the city secretary.

=== Politics ===
==== Regional People's Representative Assembly ====
Banjarbaru Regional People's Representative Council Dewan Perwakilan Rakyat Daerah Banjarbaru
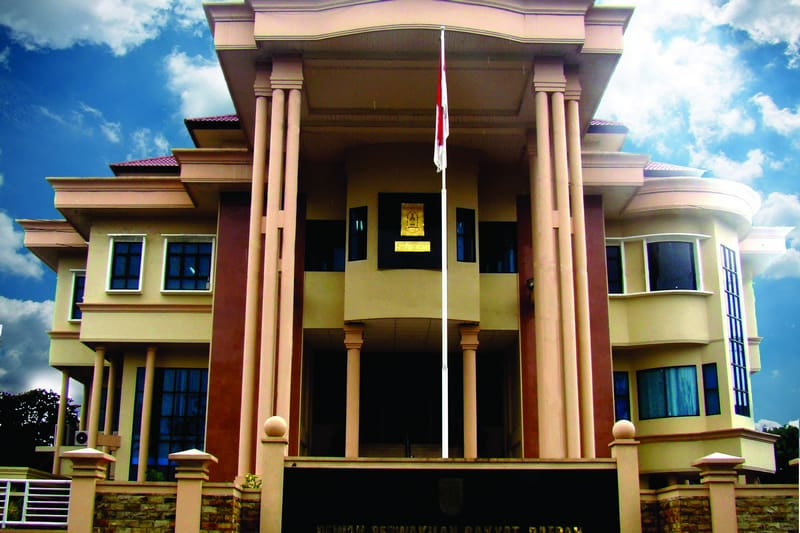
- Building of Banjarbaru city parliament (Banjarbaru People's Representative Council)

Type
- Type: Unicameral

History
- New session started: 9 October 2019

Structure
- Seats: 30
- Political groups: PKB (3) Gerindra (6) PDIP (3) Golkar (5) NasDem (4) PPP (4) PKS (2) PAN (2) Demokrat (1)

Elections
- Voting system: Open list

The city is part of the 7th electoral district for provincial parliament, together with Tanah Laut Regency, which combined have 8 out of 55 representatives. At the city level, the parliament of the city has 30 representatives from four electoral districts. They are 1st electoral district (consist of South Banjarbaru and North Banjarbaru) with 12 representatives, 2nd electoral district (consist of Cempaka) with 4 representatives, 3rd electoral district (consist of Liang Anggang) with 5 representatives, and 4th electoral district (consist of Landasan Ulin) with 9 representatives. As of 2021, the last election for parliament was on 17 April 2019 and the next one will be in the year 2024.

Electoral District	Region	Representatives
Banjarbaru 1st	South Banjarbaru, North Banjarbaru	12
Banjarbaru 2nd	Cempaka	4
Banjarbaru 3rd	Liang Anggang	5
Banjarbaru 4th	Landasan Ulin	9
Total		30

== Culture and entertainment ==
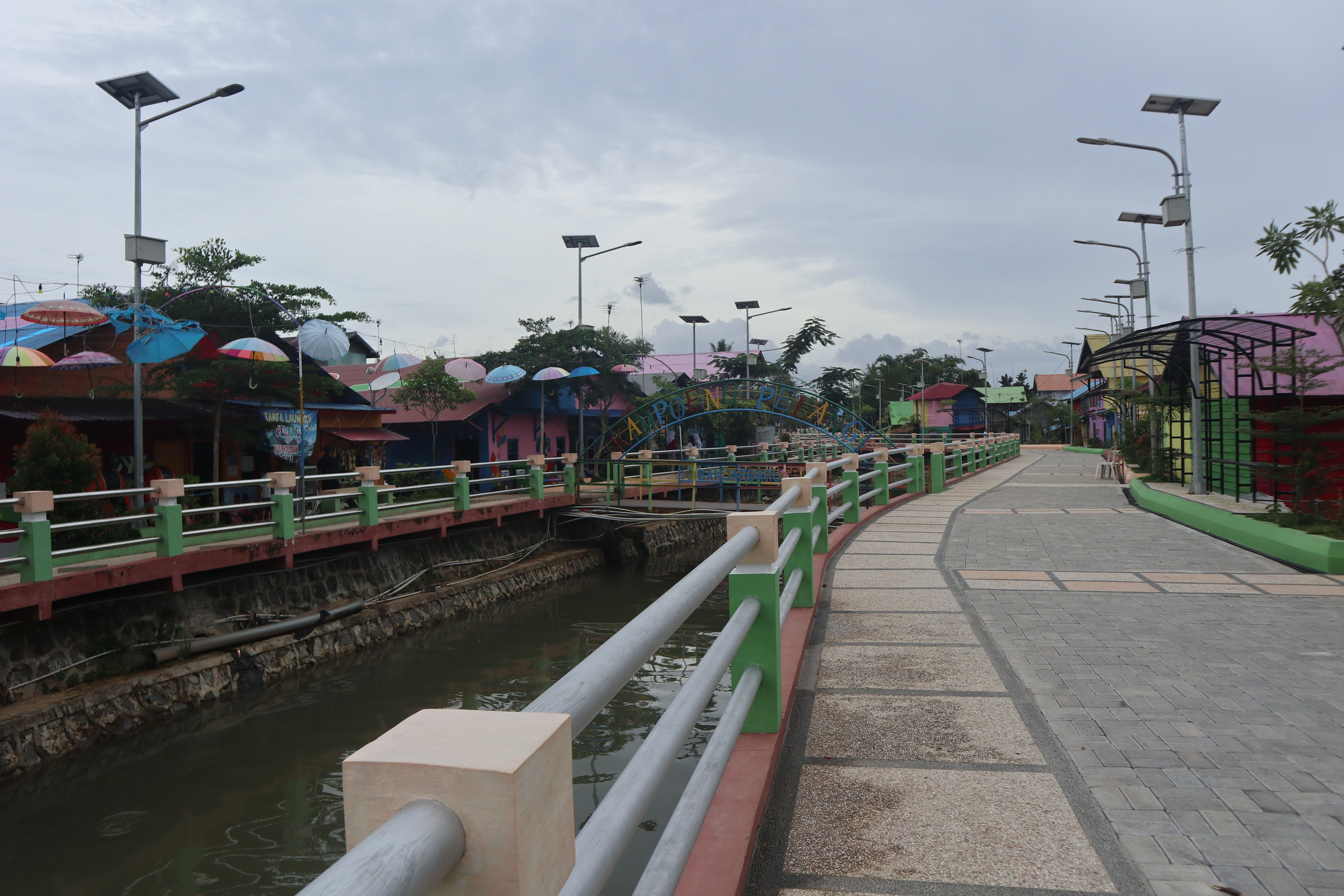
Kampung Pelangi, Banjarbaru

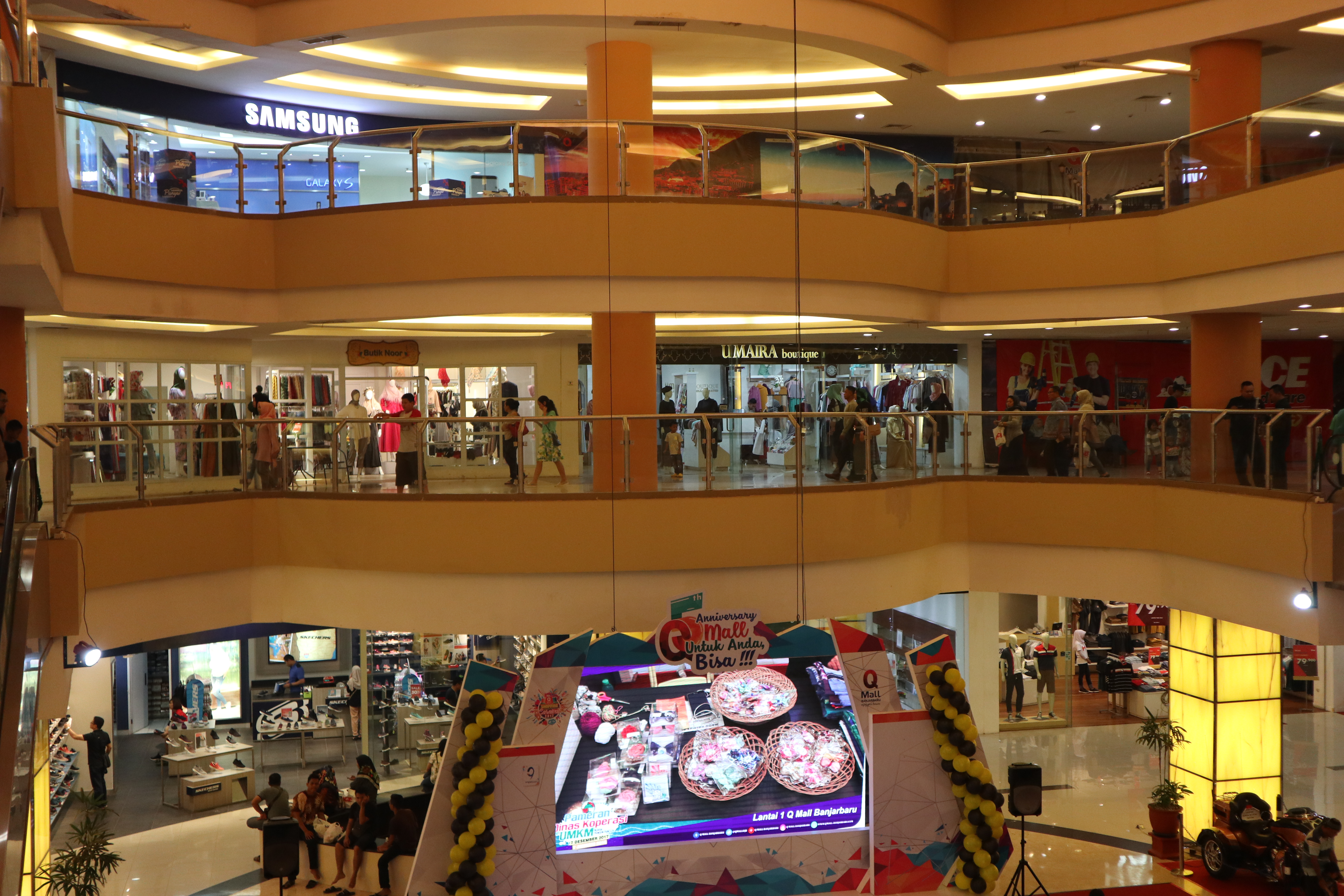
Inside of QMall Banjarbaru, the only mall in the city as of 2019.

There is only one shopping mall in the city, QMall, which is located in the North Banjarbaru district, located on a 40 hectare plot of land. It is integrated with one hotel, Grand Dafam Q Hotel, which is connected to the mall itself. Several entertainment & amusement parks exist in the city, such as Amanah Borneo Park, Banua Labyrinth Park, Aquatica Waterpark, and QMall Waterboom. The city also has a public swimming pool owned by the city government named Idaman Public Swimming Pool. Mentaos Pine Forest, a 1,000 square kilometer city forest located in the North Banjarbaru district, is also a popular tourist destination.

"Kampung Pelangi" (lit: rainbow village) has become a major tourist spot in the city. It is located on the edge of the Kemuning river, South Banjarbaru district. Previously a slum, it has been upgraded to showcase a waterfront, a better housing complex with parks, a pedestrian area, and WiFi corners.

There is only one museum in the city, Lambung Mangkurat Museum, and it has several historical collections from the Banjar Sultanate era to the National Revolution.

== Health ==
There are seven hospitals in the city, 10 puskesmas, 37 clinics, 128 healthcare centers, and 18 maternity cottages. The biggest public hospital, Idaman Regional Hospital, is owned by the city government. Other than that, the biggest private hospital in the city is the Syifa Medika Hospital, located in the Landasan Ulin district. There are also three laboratoriums for various purposes in the city as of 2021, one of them being a disease control laboratorium.

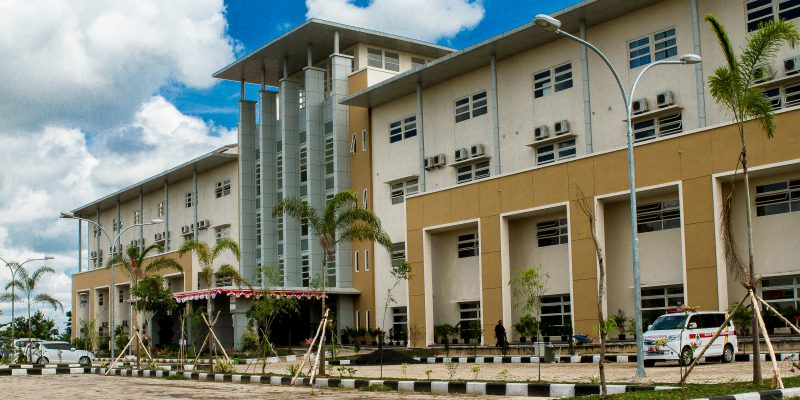
Idaman Regional Hospital

== Education ==
In Banjarbaru, there are 164 kindergartens, 83 elementary schools, 37 junior high schools, 23 senior high schools, and 16 vocational high schools (SMK) both public and private. In addition, there are 14 higher education institutions; the most notable being Lambung Mangkurat University. Lambung Mangkurat University is also the only public university in the city, while the rest of higher education institutions are private.

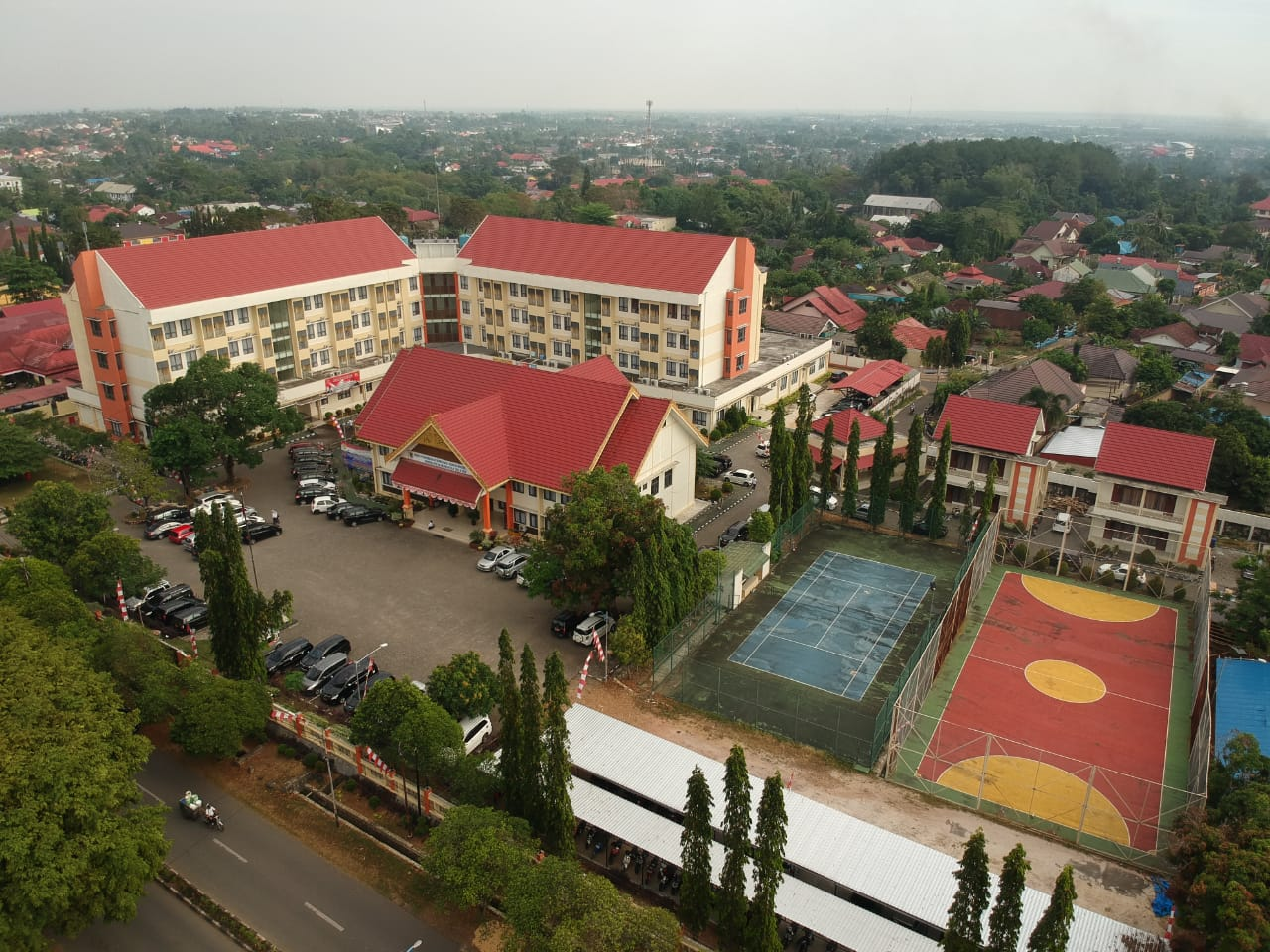
A campus complex in Banjarbaru

== Landmarks ==
Dr. Murdjani Field – named after a former governor of the province – is located at the center of the city across from the city hall and city park complex. Previously, the city featured the Haji Idak Stadium, but it was demolished and the site is now used for the new wet market building. As the replacement, a bigger new sport complex named "New Stadium of Banjarbaru" is planned to be built in the Landasan Ulin district. Previously the main wet market in the city was located close to city parks, but it was relocated in early 2021.

Komet Windpump, originally built in 1972 and restored in 2021, was the naming inspiration for the surrounding Komet subdistrict.

=== Places of worship ===
There are more than 50 mosques in the city, a Balinese temple in the Landasan Ulin district, and around 20 churches in the city. The biggest mosque in the city is Al Munawarah Grand Mosque in South Banjarbaru. It was inaugurated by then-mayor of the city, Rudy Resnawan, on 1 July 2010.

== Transportation ==
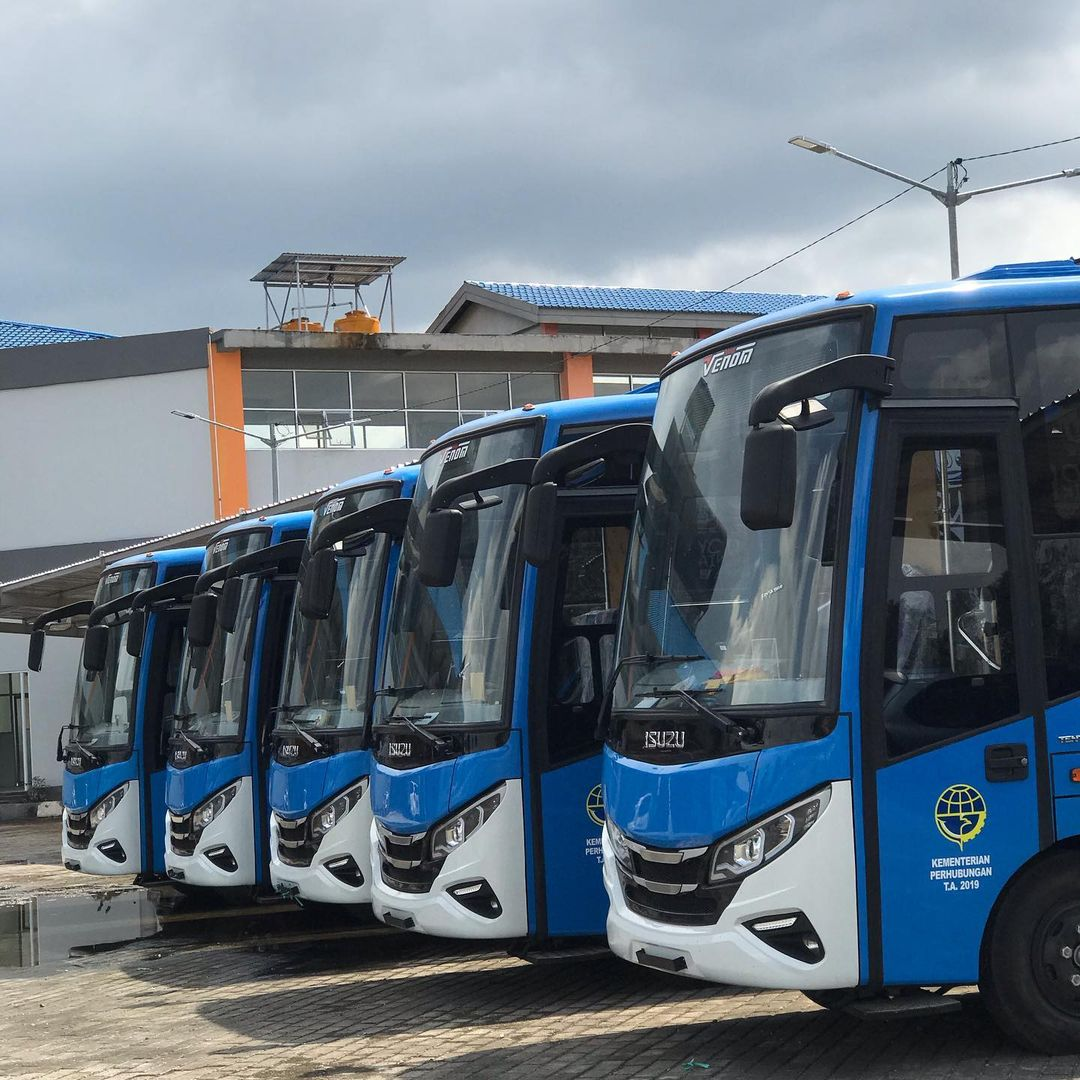
A fleet of BRT Banjarbakula bus, which serves Banjarbaru city

The city is served by two bus rapid transit systems, BRT Banjarbakula and Trans Banjarbakula, which also serves neighboring regencies and cities. There are also angkots in the city, online motorcycle taxi services provided by Gojek and Grab, and conventional taxis. In 2021, another bus service, Trans Banjarbakula, also launched serving the city.

Syamsudin Noor International Airport is located in the Landasan Ulin district. Banjarbaru has more than 645 km (401 mi) of roads, of which 539 km (335 mi) are paved with asphalt. The city is connected to Trans-Kalimantan Highway Southern Route, which connects it to other cities such as Banjarmasin and to the neighboring provinces, East Kalimantan and Central Kalimantan. A toll road connecting the city to Batulicin is under construction as of November 2020.

As of 2021, there is a plan for an airport rail link which is expected to start construction in December 2021, which would also be connected to Banjarmasin. At the same time, the government is making plans for a new development area dubbed "Aero City", aimed to spur further development in the region.

== Media ==
According to the Press Council, there are four media companies registered in Banjarbaru, consisting of two cyber media, one printed, and one television. They are KanalKalimantan, Teras7, Radar Banjarmasin, and Amaco Media. However, due to lack of registration & verification, the numbers could be higher according to the Indonesian Cyber Media Union. There are two known radio stations, Nirwana FM Banjarbaru and Abdi Persada FM. Nirwana FM Banjarbaru is licensed by the Ministry of Communication and Information Technology.

The city government, according to Regional Regulation Number 2 Year 2010, established "Local Public Broadcaster" on television and radio, and it is supervised by local government civil servants. This, according to the law, acted as a means for the city government to communicate with city public and has non-commercial nature.

== See also ==
- List of regencies and cities of Indonesia
