= Sahbirin Noor =

Indonesian politician

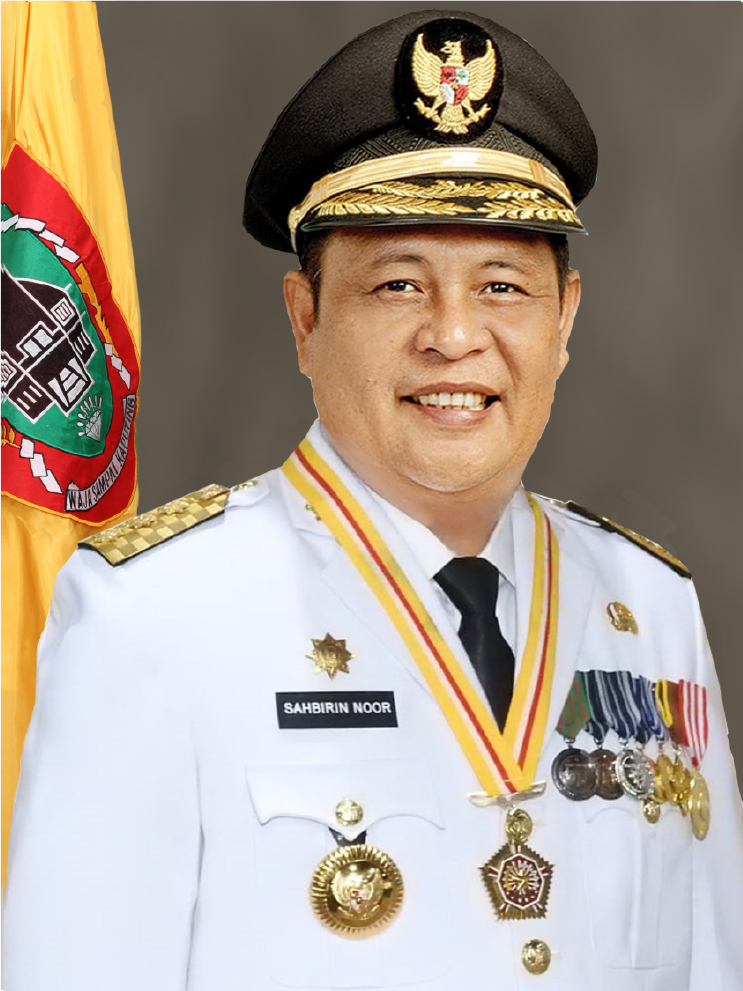

Governor of South Kalimantan
- In office 12 February 2016 – 13 October 2024
- President: Joko Widodo; Prabowo Subianto
- Deputy: Rudi Resnawan (2016–2021); Muhidin (2021–2024)
- Preceded by: Tarmizi Abdul Karim
- Succeeded by: Muhidin

Personal details
- Born: 12 November 1967 (age 58) Banjarmasin, South Kalimantan, Indonesia
- Citizenship: Indonesian
- Party: Golkar
- Spouse: Raudatul Jannah
- Children: 3
- Education: Islamic University of Kalimantan Muhammad Arsyad Al Banjari; Putra Bangsa University; Lambung Mangkurat University
- Occupation: Politician

Sahbirin Noor is an Indonesian politician who served as the governor of South Kalimantan from 2016 until 2024. His vice governor Rudy Resnawan rebounded after having initially looked poised to lose the gubernatorial election in 2015. Sahbirin has taken the initiative to rehabilitate about sixty-thousand hectares of degraded land in the province.

On 8 October 2024, Sahbirin, along with six others, were named as suspects by the Corruption Eradication Commission (KPK), due to their involvement in a bribery case relating to the construction of a football field, a swimming pool, and an administrative services office. Unlike six others, Sahbirin is yet to be detained by the KPK, but the KPK has announced that the detention would be done within 20 days.

== Honours ==
- Satyalancana Wira Karya - 2023
- Satyalancana Kebaktian Sosial - 2019
- Lencana Melati Gerakan Pramuka
- Lencana Darma Bakti Gerakan Pramuka
