= Hasnuryadi Sulaiman =

Indonesian businessman and politician

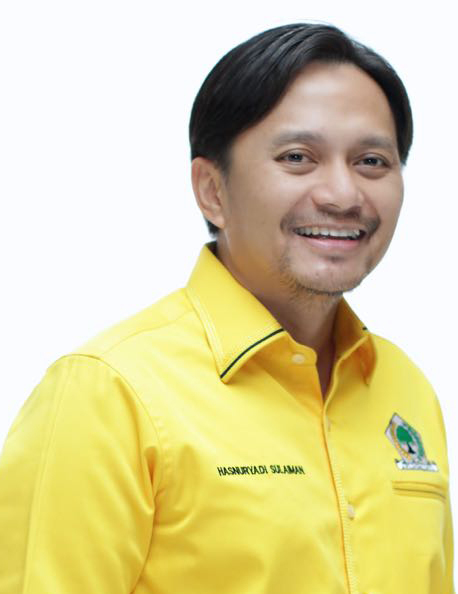

7th Vice Governor of South Kalimantan
- Incumbent
- Assumed office 20 Februari 2025
- President: Prabowo Subianto
- Governor: Muhidin
- Preceded by: Muhidin

Member of House of Representatives
- In office 1 Oktober 2014 – 24 September 2024
- Constituency: South Kalimantan II

Personal details
- Born: June 21, 1975 (age 51) Banjarmasin, South Kalimantan, Indonesia
- Party: Golkar
- Spouse: drg. Ellyana Trisya Hasnuryadi
- Parents: Abdussamad Sulaiman (father); Nurhayati (mother)
- Education: Universitas Deakin
- Occupation: Businessman; Politician

Hasnuryadi Sulaiman (born 21 June 1975) is an Indonesian businessman and politician. He is the son of H. Abdussamad Sulaiman, the founder of PS Barito Putera and the Hasnur Group, and a prominent public figure from Banjarmasin. Hasnuryadi serves as a commissioner of Hasnur Group, a conglomerate with interests in (mining, forestry, agribusiness, and media). As of 2025, he holds the position of Vice Governor of South Kalimantan.

== Career ==
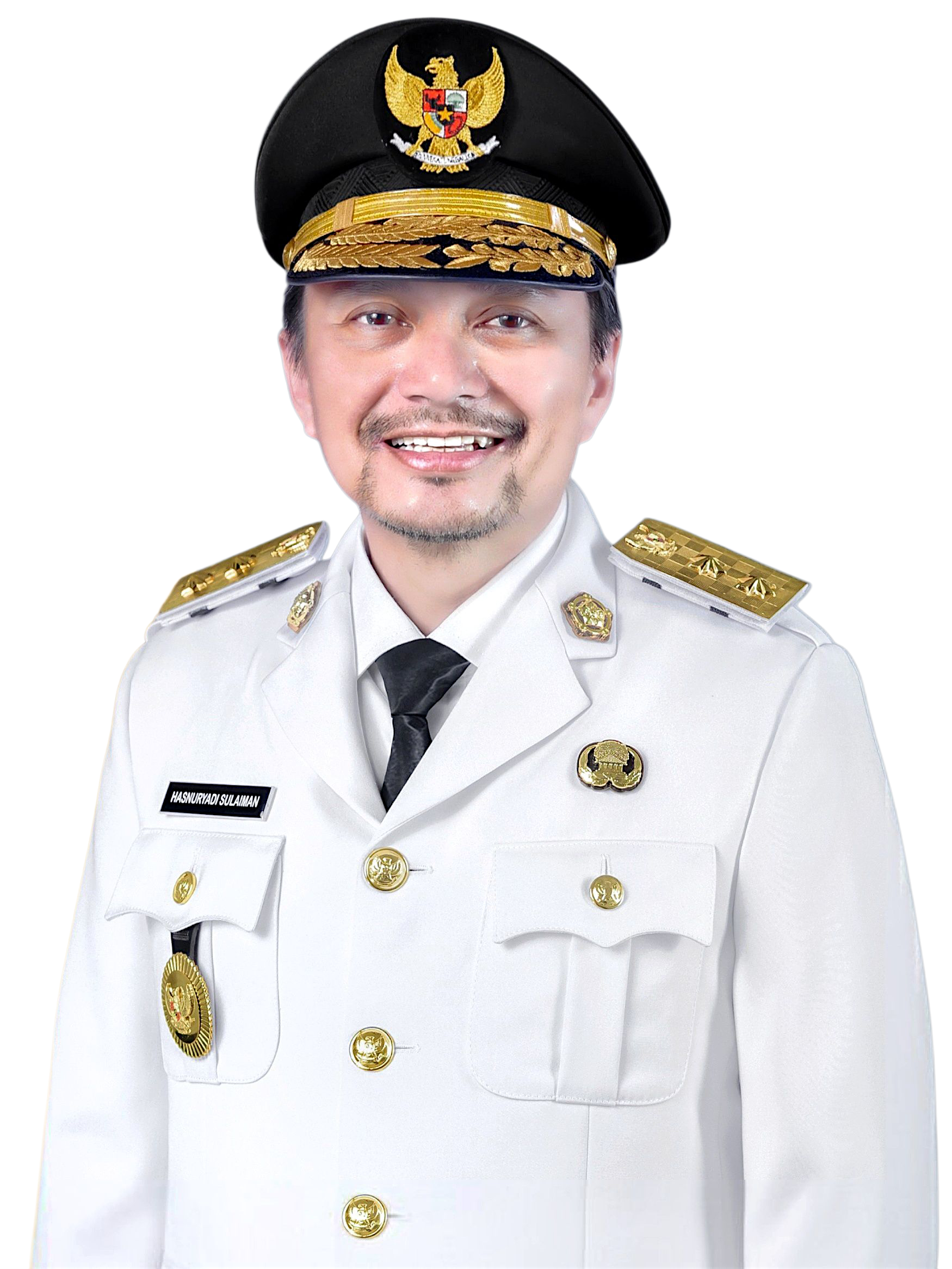
Hasnuryadi Sulaiman as Deputy Governor of South Kalimantan

- Commissioner of Hasnur Group
- Elder of Hasnur Centre Foundation
- Owner of Barito Putera
- Member of DPR-RI from Golkar Party
- Exco member of PSSI
- Deputy Governor of South Kalimantan
