= South Kalimantan Regional House of Representatives =

Unicameral legislature of the Indonesian province of South Kalimantan

South Kalimantan Province Regional House of Representative Dewan Perwakilan Rakyat Daerah Provinsi Kalimantan Selatan
- Period 2019-2024
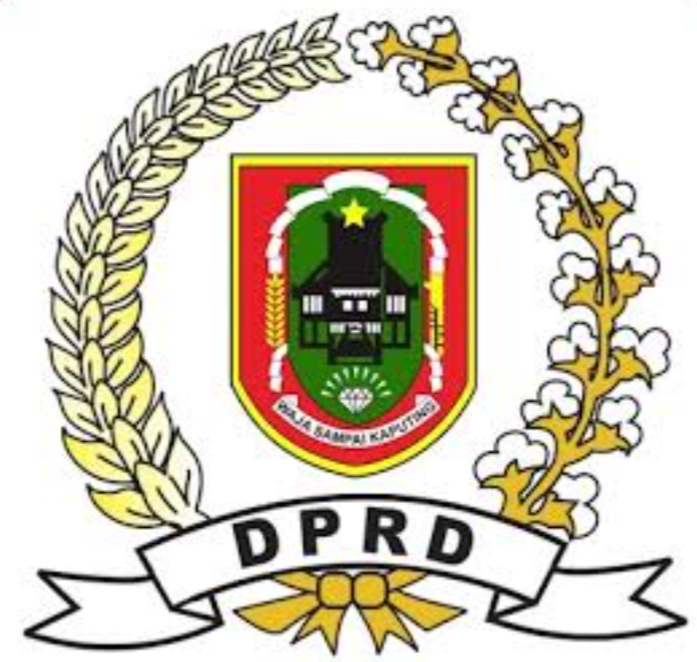

Type
- Type: Unicameral
- Term limits: 5 years

History
- New session started: 9 September 2024

Leadership
- Speaker: Dr. (H.C.) H. Supian H. K., S.H., Golkar since 7 October 2024
- Deputy Speaker: H. Kartoyo, S.M., NasDem since 7 October 2024
- Deputy Speaker: H. Muh. Alpiya Rakhman, S.E., M.M., Gerindra since 7 October 2024
- Deputy Speaker: Desy Oktavia Sari, PAN since 7 October 2024

Structure
- Seats: 55
- Political groups: Government (16): PAN (6); PKS (6); Democratic (3); PPP (1); Opposition (39): Golkar (13); NasDem (10); Gerindra (7); PKB (6); PDI-P (3)

Elections
- Voting system: Open list proportional representation
- Last election: 14 February 2024
- Next election: 2029

Meeting place
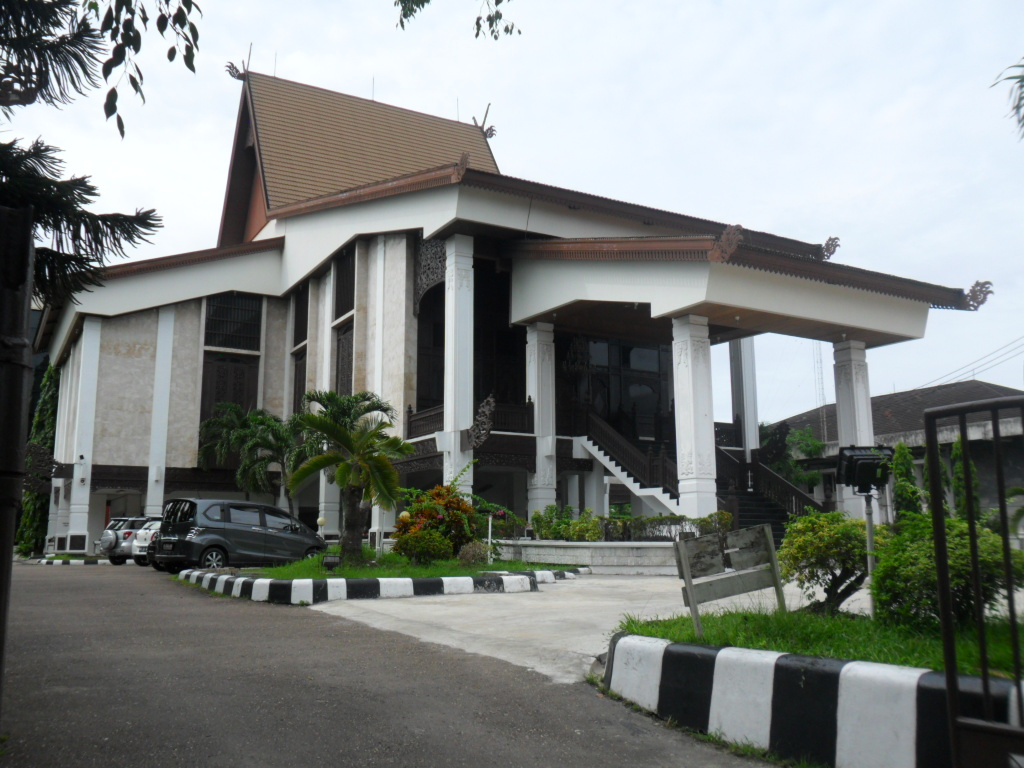
- South Kalimantan Provincial DPRD Building; Jalan Lambung Mangkurat No. 18; Postal Code 70111; Central Banjarmasin, Banjarmasin; South Kalimantan, Indonesia

Website
- dprdkalselprov.id

The South Regional House of Representatives (Indonesian: Dewan Perwakilan Rakyat Daerah Provinsi Kalimantan Selatan, abbreviated to DPRD Kalsel) is the unicameral legislature of the Indonesian province of South Kalimantan. It is composed of 55 members elected every 5 years in general election together with the national legislative election.

Currently, the Golkar Party is currently party with the most seats in this provincial legislature. In addition, the DPRD has four commissions.

== Structure ==
The council has one speaker and three deputy speakers, and also four commissions.

- Commission I of Government and Financial sector
- Commission II of Economic sector
- Commission III of People's Welfare sector
- Commission IV of Physical Structure & Infrastructure sector

== Fraction ==
Currently there are 8 fractions within the council.

Fraction	Political Parties	Leader	Seats
Golongan Karya	Golkar	Karlie Hanafi Kalianda	12
Indonesian Democratic Struggle	Indonesian Democratic Party of Struggle	M. Rosehan Noor Basri	8
Great Indonesia Movement	Great Indonesia Movement Party	Syahdillah	8
National Mandate	National Mandate Party	Habib Muhammad Zen Bahasyim	6
Prosperous Justice	Prosperous Justice Party	Ardiansyah	5
National Awakening	National Awakening Party	Hormasnyah	5
National Democrat	NasDem Party	Gina Mariati	4
Democrat Conscience Development	United Development Party; People's Conscience Party; Democratic Party	Asbulah	7
