= Jorong =

District in South Kalimantan, Indonesia

- District
- Interactive map of Jorong
- Location Jorong (Indonesia)
- Coordinates: 3°58′43.5139″S 114°55′47.4686″E
- Country: Indonesia
- Province: South Kalimantan
- Regency: Tanah Laut Regency

Area
  - Total: 697.84 km^{2} (269.44 sq mi)

Population (2020)
  - Total: 34,553
  - Density: 49.514/km^{2} (128.24/sq mi)
- Time zone: UTC+08:00 (CIT)
- Postal code: 70881
- Regional code: 63.01.02

Jorong is a district in Tanah Laut Regency, South Kalimantan, Indonesia. Tanah Laut Regency (lit. Sea Land Regency) itself was formed based on Law Number 8 of 1965, which stipulates the formation of the Tanah Laut, Tapin, and Tabalong Level II Regions. The district covers an area of 697.84 km2, and had a population of 34,553 at the 2020 Census.

== History ==
On 23 August 1995, northern portion of the district was cut off (along with two villages in Pelaihari) to form Batu Ampar district.
