= Batu Ampar, Tanah Laut =

Batu Ampar
- District
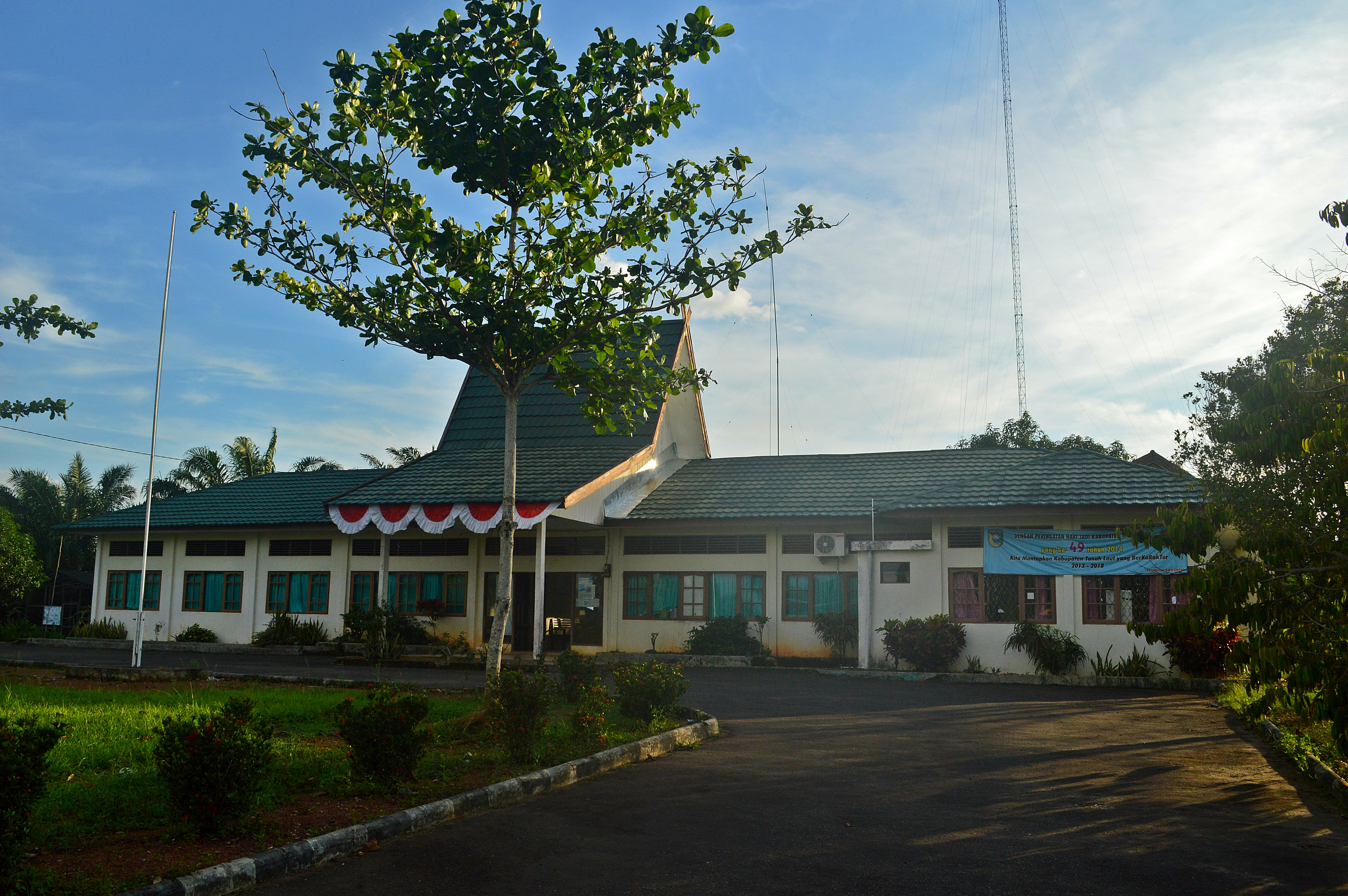
- Batu Ampar district office

- Location within Tanah Laut Regency

- Location within South Kalimantan Location within Kalimantan Location within Indonesia
- Coordinates: 3°53′S 114°49′E
- Country: Indonesia
- Province: South Kalimantan
- Regency: Tanah Laut Regency
- Established: 23 August 1995
- District seat: Batu Ampar

Area
  - Total: 419.05 km^{2} (161.80 sq mi)

Population (2023)
  - Total: 28,677
  - Density: 68.433/km^{2} (177.24/sq mi)
- Time zone: UTC+08:00 (ICT)
- Postal code: 70882
- Regional code: 63.01.09

Batu Ampar is a district in Tanah Laut Regency, South Kalimantan, Indonesia. The district covers an area of 419.05, and had a population of 28,677 at the 2023 estimate.

== History ==
Batu Ampar was established on 23 August 1995, after being split off from the eastern part of Jorong and two villages from Pelaihari districts, respectively.

== Geography ==
Batu Ampar consists of 14 villages (desa):

- Batu Ampar
- Gunung Mas
- Tajau Mulya
- Jilatan
- Durian Bungkuk
- Ambawang
- Damit
- Gunung Melati
- Bluru
- Pantai Linuh
- Damit Hulu
- Jilatan Alur
- Damar Lima
- Tajau Pecah
