= Bakumpai people =

Ethnic group in Indonesia

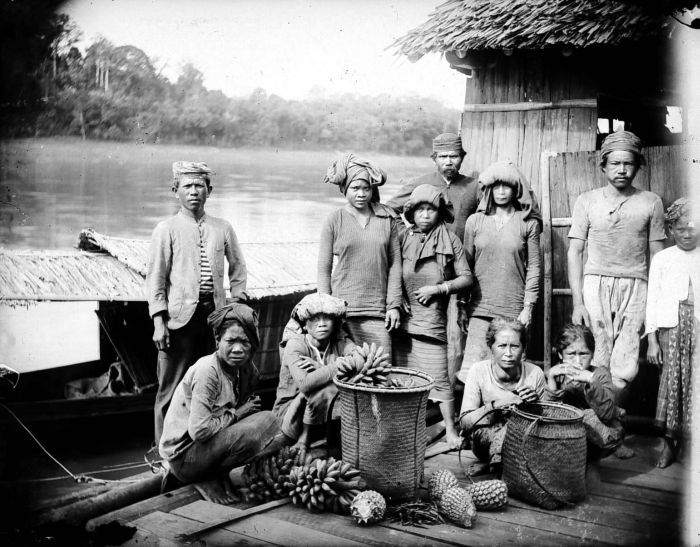
- Dayak Bakumpai society in Barito River, circa 1920.

Total population
- 171,000

Regions with significant populations
- Indonesia
- Central Kalimantan: 135,297 (2000)
- South Kalimantan: 20,609 (2000)
- East Kalimantan: 1,000 (2000)

Languages
- Bakumpai language, Indonesian language

Religion
- Sunni Islam

Related ethnic groups
- Banjar people, Dayak people, Ngaju people, Tidung people

Bakumpai or Baraki are indigenous people of Borneo and are considered as a sub-ethnic group of the Dayak Ngaju people group with Islamic background. The Bakumpai people first occupy along the Barito riverbanks in South Kalimantan and Central Kalimantan, from Marabahan to Puruk Cahu, Murung Raya Regency. The Bakumpai people first appeared as a newly recognized people group in census 2000 and were made up of 7.51% of Central Kalimantan population, which before this the Bakumpai people were considered as part of the Dayak people in a 1930 census.

Bakumpai people originate from the upstream region of the former Bakumpai district, while the settlement of the Barangas people (Baraki) are in the downstream region. On the northern side of the upstream region from the former Bakumpai district is the Mangkatib (Mengkatib) district, which makes the settlement of the Dayak Bara Dia people or Dayak Mengkatib people. The Bakumpai people as well as the Mengkatib people are descendants of the Ngaju people from Tanahdayak.

== Etymology ==
The name "Bakumpai" is a nickname for Dayak people who live along the Barito Riverbanks. In the Banjar language, Bakumpai comes from the word ba which means "own" and kumpai which means "grass". From this nickname, it is understood that this people dwell in the grassland region.

=== Mythology ===
According to legend, the origins of the Bakumpai Dayaks came from Ngaju people who settled on the current land which is called Marabahan. In the beginning, they practice Kaharingan, the religion of their ancestors, which can be seen as well in the cultures of other Dayak people. Later, they came across a charismatic man in that land, who could cause the ground that he stood on to grow grass. That man is none other than Nabiyullah Khidir. In the story, they followed him and converted to Islam, and multiplied into a group of people. When they studied religion in a particular region together with their teacher, Nabiyullah Khidir, grass would begin to grow from the ground and thus they are referred to as Bakumpai people.

The Bakumpai people once had a kingdom that is much older than the kingdoms of the Banjar region, but because of supernatural abilities the kingdom had to be relocated to the Barito River and its king is known with the name Datuk Barito. From Marabahan, they spread to the streams of Barito River. According to local folklore, there is an area in Murung Raya Regency called Muara Untu where in the beginning it was a jungle controlled by a race of jinn named Untu. Later there was a Bakumpai man named, Raghuy who traveled and lived there. Until today if observed from the lineage of the Muara Untu people, they would trace their ancestors to Raghuy.

== Culture ==
The Bakumpai people have been greatly influenced by the language, culture, customary laws and architecture of the Banjar people. Hence the Bakumpai people in terms of culture and customary laws are classified as part of Banjarese culture, but in linguistic terms the Bakumpai are closely related to the Ngaju people. They speak Bakumpai language.

Almost all Bakumpai people practices Islam and Kaharingan, the traditional belief of the Dayak people is relatively unseen compared to other Dayak people groups. Customary ceremonies that are related to old beliefs are such as Badewa and Manyanggar Lebu rituals.

== Lineage ==
Bakumpai people are considered as a sub-ethnic of the Ngaju people. The Ngaju people are one of the four people group from a bigger familial group also called as the Dayak Ngaju or Ot Danum people. This people group is also known as Dayak Ot Danum, as the Ngaju people are the descendants of the Dayak Ot Danum people that came from the upstream rivers that are found in the region but may have undergone changes in their language. Therefore, the Dayak Ot Danum people is considered as the parent tribe, but the Ngaju people is still the dominant ethnic in the region.

The tribal genealogy of the Bakumpai people:-

- Dayak people (the originator) divided into primary ethnics:
  - Sea Dayaks or Iban people
  - Land Dayaks
  - Dayak Apo Kayan or Kenyah-Bahau people
  - Murut people
  - Ngaju people or Dayak Ot Danum people, divides into four sub-ethnic groups:
    - Ma'anyan people
    - Lawangan people
    - Dusun people
    - Ngaju people, divides into smaller sub-ethnics:
      - Bakumpai people
      - Meratus people
      - and many more.

The relationship comparison of the Bakumpai people and the Ngaju people is liken to the relationship of the Tenggerese people and the Javanese people, where the Ngaju people is the parent ethnic of the Bakumpai people.

== Population ==
The population of the Bakumpai people in Indonesia is 171,000. In a 2000 census, the population of the Bakumpai people in South Kalimantan is 20,609. In South Kalimantan, they mostly found in Barito Kuala Regency with a population of 18,892.

The population of the Bakumpai people (2000 census) are divided as the following:-

- 20,609 in South Kalimantan
- 135,297 in Central Kalimantan
- 1,000 in East Kalimantan (Long Iram, West Kutai Regency)

Population of the Bakumpai people in South Kalimantan of 20,609 are distributed into regencies and cities, such as:-

- 32 in Tanah Laut Regency
- 397 in Kota Baru Regency (including Tanah Bumbu Regency)
- 34 in Banjar Regency
- 18,892 in Barito Kuala Regency
- 12 in Tapin Regency
- 3 in South Hulu Sungai Regency
- 23 in Central Hulu Sungai Regency
- 42 in North Hulu Sungai Regency (including Balangan Regency)
- 41 in Tabalong Regency
- 1,048 in Banjarmasin
- 85 in Banjarbaru

Regencies or cities that have Bakumpai tribal organization are:-

- Barito Kuala Regency (Bakumpai district, Tabukan and Kuripan)
- South Barito Regency
- East Barito Regency
- North Barito Regency
- Murung Raya Regency
- Kapuas Regency
- Pulang Pisau Regency
- Palangkaraya
- Katingan Regency, a form of enclave
- Banjarmasin
- West Kutai Regency (1,7% population)

The organization of the Bakumpai people is the "Kerukunan Keluarga Bakumpai" (KKB), which was Kalimantan's local party during the 1955 election.

== Notable Bakumpai people ==
- K.H. Hasan Basri, chairman of Mejelis Ulama Indonesia.
- Professor Anwari Dilmy, rector of Universitas Lambung Mangkurat.
- Z.A. Maulani, chief of Badan Intelijen Negara.
- Commander Wangkang, Dayak commander in Barito Kuala Regency during the Banjar War (1859–1905).
- Commander Batur, Banjar War (1859–1905) fighter.
