= Ethnic groups in Southeast Asia =

Ethnic groups

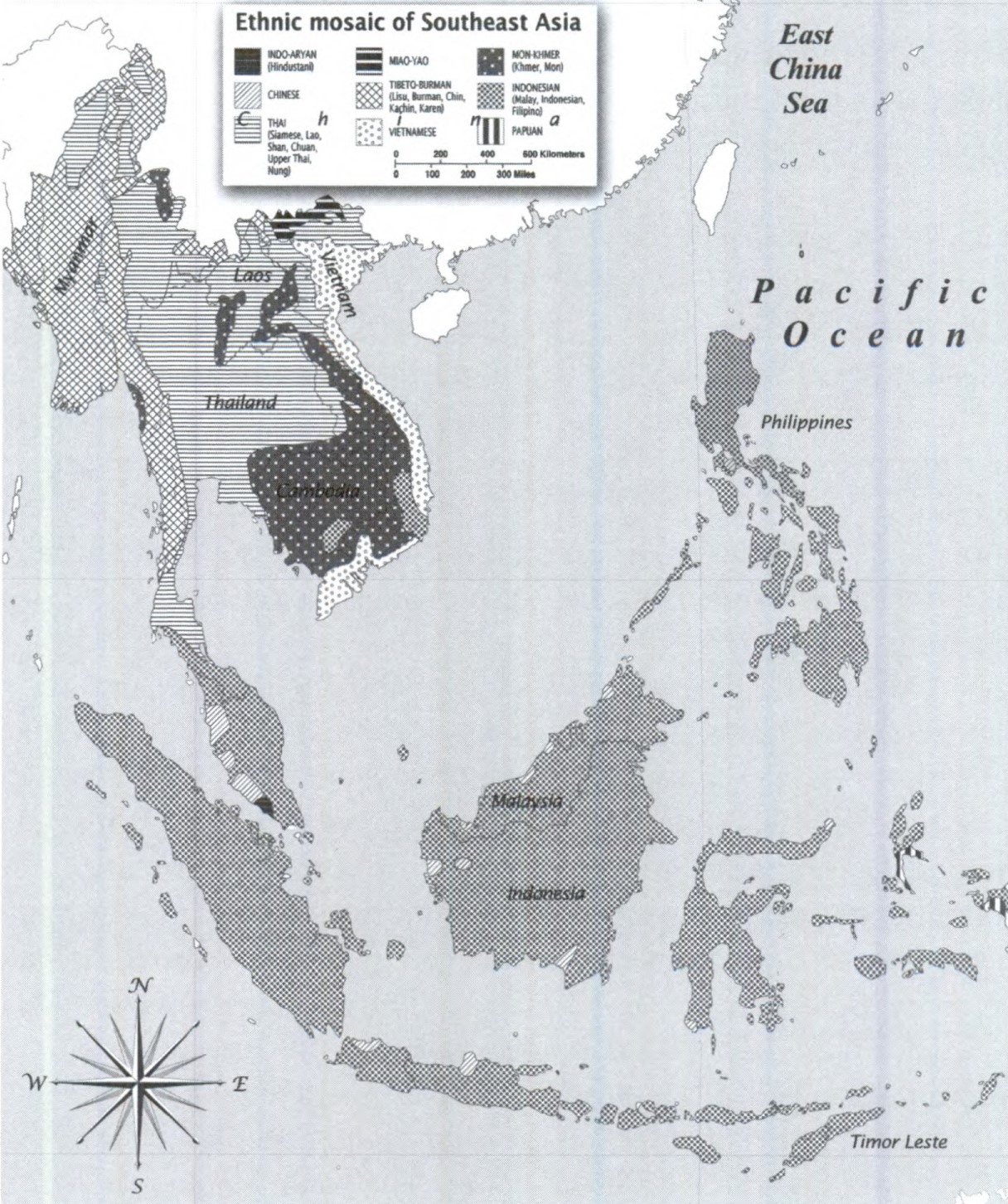
Ethnic groups of all of Southeast Asia

The ethnic groups in Southeast Asia comprise many different ethnolinguistic stocks. Besides indigenous Southeast Asians, many East Asians and South Asians call Southeast Asia their home. The total Southeast Asian population stands at 655 million (2019).

== Austroasiatic ==
Distribution of Austroasiatic languages

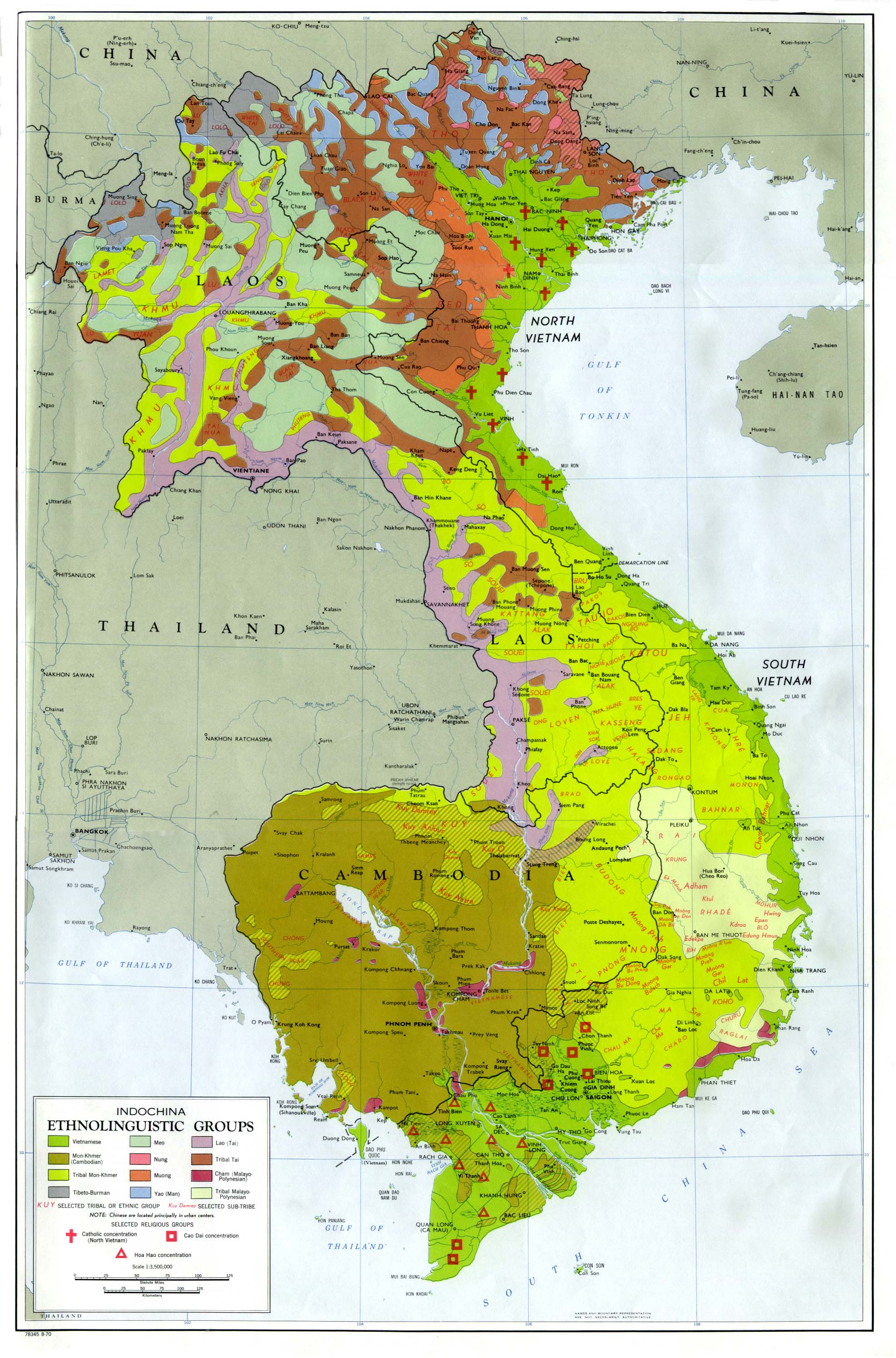
Ethnolinguistic map of Indochina, 1970. Note: map situation has now changed due to internal migration.

- Vietnamese people
- Thổ people
- Chut people
- Muong people
- Mon people
- Palaung people
- Wa people
- Khmer people
- Bahnar people
- Katuic peoples
- Pear people
- Khmu people
- Nicobarese people
- Senoi peoples

== Austronesian ==
Dispersal of Austronesian languages

Distribution of the Bumiputera (indigenous people) and Chinese population in Malaysia

Map of ethnic groups in Indonesia

Major ethnic groups in the Philippines

- Indonesian Archipelago and Malay Peninsula
  - Javanese people
    - Osing
    - Tenggerese
    - Cirebonese
  - Sundanese people
    - Baduy
    - Bantenese
  - Malay people
    - Bruneian Malays
    - Kelantan Malays
    - Kedahan Malays
    - Kedayan
    - Patani Malays
    - Perak Malays
    - Singaporean Malays
    - Terengganu Malays
    - Jawi Peranakan
  - Minangkabau people
  - Lampung people
  - Haloban people
  - Simeulue people
  - Komering people
  - Madurese people
  - Batak people
    - Toba Batak
    - Karo
    - Angkola
    - Pakpak
    - Mandailing
    - Simalungun
  - Nias people
  - Balinese people
  - Sasak people
  - Sumbawa people
  - Banjar people
  - Bugis people
  - Makassar people
  - Moluccans
  - Torajan people
  - Mandarese People
  - Minahasan People
  - Acehnese people
  - Bantenese
  - Dayak people
    - Bidayuh
    - Ngaju people
    - Ma'anyan people
    - Lawangan people
    - Dusun people
    - Kenyah people
    - Kayan people (Borneo)
    - Bahau people
    - Iban people
    - Klemantan people
    - Ketungau people
    - Basap people
    - Punan people
    - Idaʼan
    - Murut people
    - Tidung people
    - Ot Danum people
  - Bimanese people
  - Atoni people
  - Manggarai people
  - Sumba people
  - Lamaholot people
  - Tetun people
  - Mambai people
  - Kemak people
  - Alfur people
  - Mandar people
  - Gorontalo people
  - Kaili
  - Toraja
  - Tolaki
  - Butonese people
  - Muna people
  - Bajau
  - Mongondow
  - Sangihe
  - Lun Bawang/Lundayeh
  - Kadazan
  - Melanau people
  - Cham people
  - Jarai people
- Philippine Archipelago
  - Bicolano people
  - Gaddang people
  - Ilocano people
  - Ibanag people
  - Igorot peoples
    - Bontoc
    - Ibaloi people
    - Ifugao people
    - Isneg people
    - Kalinga people
    - Kankana-ey
    - Tingguian
  - Ilongot people
  - Itawis
  - Ivatan people
  - Kapampangan people
  - Lumad peoples
    - B'laan people
    - Bagobo
    - Mandaya
    - Manobo
    - Mansaka
    - Matigsalug
    - Subanon people
    - T'boli people
  - Mangyan peoples
    - Alangan
    - Tadyawan
  - Moro people
    - Iranun people
    - Jama Mapun
    - Kalagan people
    - Maguindanao people
    - Maranao people
    - Molbog people
    - Sama people
    - Sangirese people
    - Tausūg people
    - Yakan people
  - Pangasinan people
  - Sambal people
  - Tagalog people
  - Visayans
    - Aklanon people
    - Boholano people
    - Butuanon people
    - Capiznon people
    - Cebuano people
    - Cuyunon people
    - Eskaya people
    - Hiligaynon people
    - Karay-a people
    - Masbateño people
    - Porohanon people
    - Romblomanon people
    - Suludnon
    - Surigaonon people
    - Waray people

== Negrito peoples ==
- Aeta people
- Andamanese
- Ati people
- Batak (Philippines)
- Mamanwa
- Orang Asli
  - Semang
    - Batek
    - Jahai
    - Lanoh
    - Mani (Mani people are closely related to Kensiu people in neighbouring Malaysia)

== Sino-Tibetan ==
=== Tibeto-Burman ===
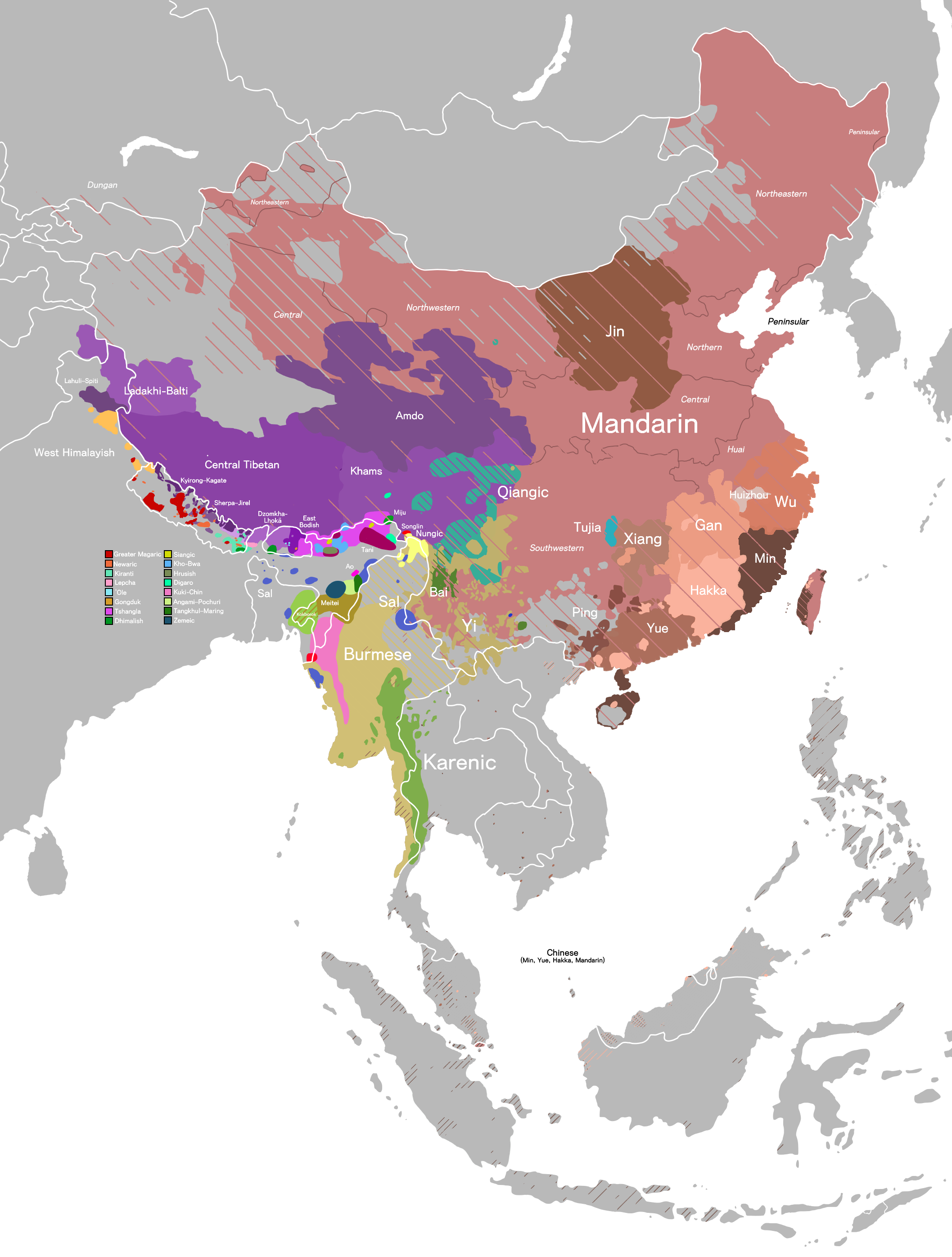
Distribution of Sino-Tibetan languages

- Bamar people
- Chakma people
- Karen people
- Rakhine people
  - Kamein
  - Daingnet
  - Marma
- Karenni people
- Kachin people
- Zo people
  - Chin people
  - Mizo people
  - Kuki people
- Naga people
- Meitei people
- Bodo people

=== Hua ===
- Han people
  - North Han people
    - Tientsinese
    - Beijingese
    - Shandongese
    - Hebeiese
  - Southwestern Han Chinese
    - Sichuanese
    - Yunnanese
      - Kokang people
  - Fujianese
    Primary branches of Chinese according to the Language Atlas of China
    - Fuzhou people
      - Hokchia people (福清人)
      - Foochew people (福州人)
    - Henghua people
    - Hokkien people
      - Cambodian Hokkien
      - Quanzhou
      - Zhangzhou
      - Taiwanese Hokkien people (in Malaysia&Singapore, in Vietnam)
    - Teochew people
    - Hainanese people
  - Cantonese
    - Kwongsai people
    - Szeyupese people
    - Guangzhounese
    - Weitou people
  - Hakkanese
    - Ho Poh people (河婆人)
    - Ngái
    - Taiwanese Hakka
  - Sam Kiang people (三江人)
    - Kiang Si people
    - Jianghuai people
    - Jiang Zhe people
      - Shanghainese
      - Wenzhounese
  - Other Han Chinese subgroups
- Minh Hương
- Tanka
- Peranakan
  - Benteng Chinese
- Sino-Native
  - Sino-Dusun
  - Sino-Kadazan
  - Sino-Murut
- Sino-Burmese
- Sino-Thai
- Chinese mestizo
- Chindian

=== Hui ===
- Panthay
- Chin Haw

== Hmong–Mien ==
Distribution of Hmong–Mien languages

- Sa
- San Diu
- Mien
- Hmong
  - Miao
    - Gha-Mu people
    - A-Hmao people
- Pa Then people
- Gejia people

== Kra-Dai ==
Distribution of Kra–Dai languages

- Thai people
- Lao people
- Kadai peoples
- Kam–Sui peoples
- Tay people
- Saek people
- Nung people
- Nyaw people
- Lu people
- Kongsat
- White Tai
- Shan people

== Indo-Aryan and Dravidian ==
=== Indo Aryan ===
- Maramagyi (classified as part of the Rakhine race)
- Rohingya people (Arakanese Indians)

=== Indo-Aryan and Dravidian ===
- Burmese Indians
- Indians in Brunei
- Indian Indonesians
- Indian settlement in the Philippines
- Indians in Thailand
- Malaysian Indian
- Singapore Indian
- Sri Lankans in Malaysia

== Arabian ==
- Arab Malaysians
- Arab Indonesians
- Arab Singaporeans
- Arab Filipinos
- Hadhrami people

== Eurasian ==
- Amerasian
- Filipino mestizo
  - Zamboangueño people
- Eurasian
  - Kristang people (Malaysian Portuguese)
  - Eurasians in Singapore
  - Kristang people
  - Mardijker people
- Indo people
- Anglo-Burmese people

== See also ==
- History of Southeast Asia
- Demographics of Southeast Asia
- Genetic history of Southeast Asia
- Classification of Southeast Asian languages
