= Bakumpai =

Bakumpai may refer to:

- Bakumpai language
- Bakumpai people
