= Sandung =

Indonesian ossuary

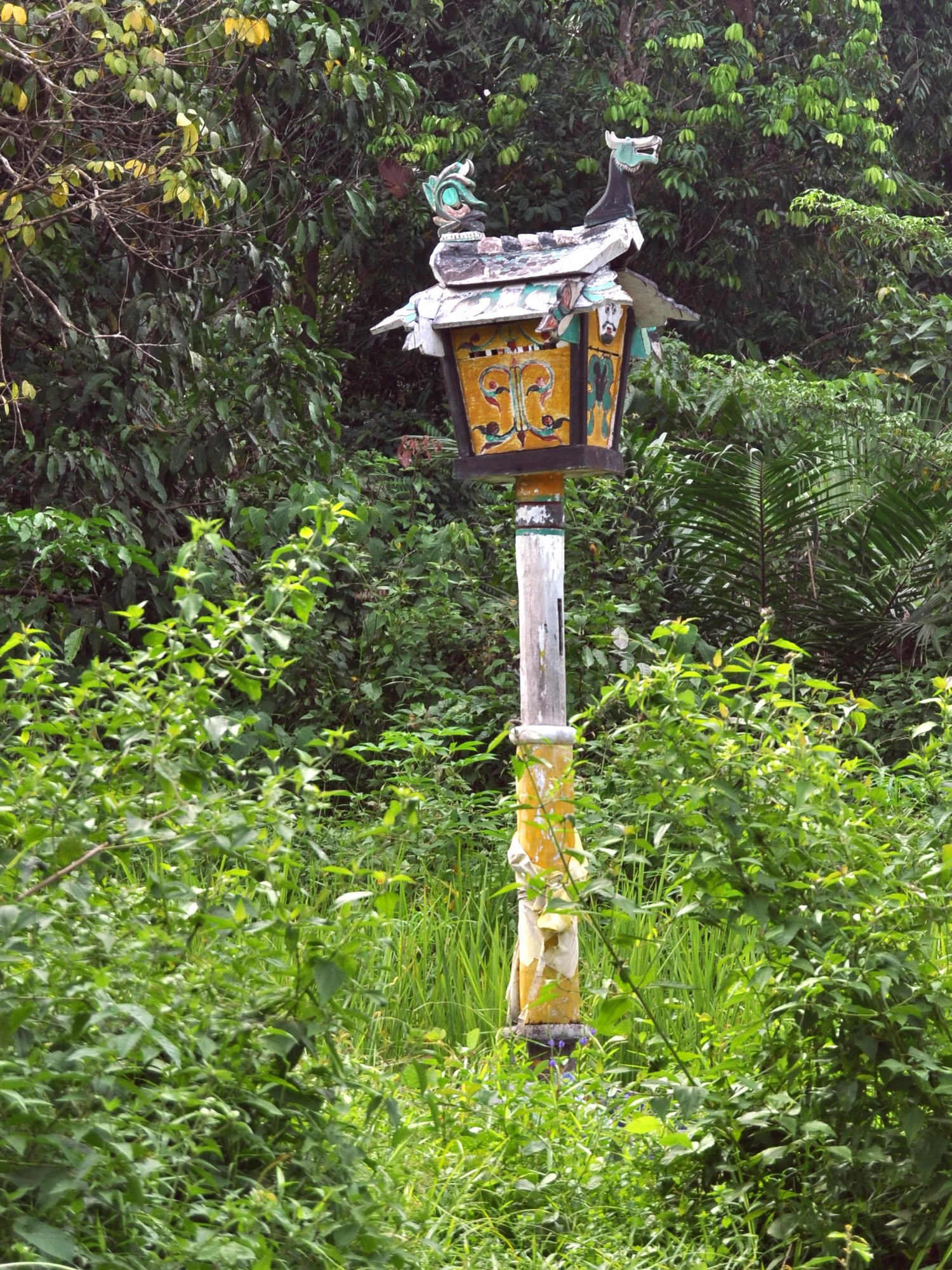
Details of a sandung of Pesaguan people in Ketapang Regency, West Kalimantan. Note a sculpture of a dragon above it.

Sandung or sandong is the ossuary of the Katingan, Ngaju, and Pesaguan people native to southern and central Kalimantan in Indonesia who still remain of the Kaharingan religion, as well as the Dayak people of neighbouring Malaysian state Sarawak, altogether in the island of Borneo. It is an integral part of the Tiwah ceremony of the Ngaju people, which is basically a secondary burial ritual where the bones of the deceased are taken from the cemeteries, purified, and finally placed in a sandung.

== Form and types ==
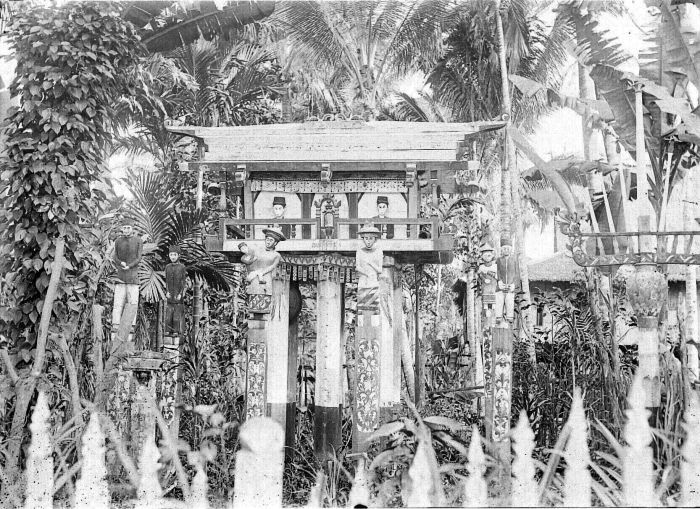
A sandung in Central Kalimantan ca. 1915.

The sandung is a wooden ossuary shaped like a small house, with ornate roofs, windows, doors, and miniature stairs. Ideally, a sandung is made of ironwood or any fruit-bearing tree like that of the durian, although today lighter wood from any kind of trees can also be used. The house-shaped ossuary will actually be brought by the deceased to paradise to become their house. Sandungs are painted in bright colors and decorated with carvings representing various religious symbols and patterns. The base of the sandung container is usually decorated with foliage pattern representing the mythical tree of life. Figures of man and woman painted on both side of the miniature door is said to represent a couple which would marry and produce children who will assist their parents in guarding the repository. Other figures painted on the walls of the sandung represents different Ngaju deities from the Kaharingan folk religion. Painting or carving of moon and stars is painted on the downriver side of the sandung, while painting of the sun is depicted on the upriver side; these astronomical landmarks are related with the journey that must be passed by the souls on their way to the Kaharingan paradise, the Lewa Liau. The roof of a sandung is usually decorated with a type of wild chicken. This bird, known as the piak liau, will become a possession for the deceased in the afterlife.

Some sandung are built to contain the bones of a single individual, while others for fifty or more persons. In general, the Dayak people of the Kahayan region prefers large sandung capable of storing remains of many kin, assuring that they will form another household in the afterlife. The Dayak of the Katingan region prefer smaller sandung. A sandung for an individual person (sandung tunggal, "single sandung") is usually build for persons who had died a "bad" or unnatural death, or other reasons which deemed the person remains is inappropriate to be interred with the bones of other family members.

A sandung is normally set high above poles, although there are some sandung simply placed on the ground (known as sandung munduk). Some sandung reach the height of 20 feet (6.1 m) while others at the height of only 4 feet (1.2 m). The poles supporting the sandung are often carved with ferocious faces, bulging eyes and protruding tongues. This figure represents the animate essence of the sandung (ganan sandung) which protects the inhabitant of the sandung from potential threats. The main pole of some sandungs take on the motif of the ijuk (Arenga pinnata) palm.

There are many varieties and shapes of sandung, among those discovered in the villages of Ngaju people along the Kahayan River include:.

- Sandung buwuk, a sandung made from a tree trunk and carved with a single opening. This type of sandung is very uncommon.
- Sandung tunggal, a sandung which stands on a single pole.
- Kariring or sandung kariring is a long sandung supported by two poles.
- Sandung keratun is a sandung supported on four poles.
- Sandung raja is an enormous sandung supported on more than four poles.
- Sandung samburup is a Chinese jar in a small, open-sided hut. An uncommon type of sandung.
- Sandung munduk is a sandung built directly on the ground.
- Sandung tingang is a brass container placed in an open-sided hut with a roof carved to resemble a hornbill.
- Pambak resembles a stone or wooden crypt. Pambak is not buried, and sometimes valuables are placed in the crypt.

Unlike graves which is usually located some distance downriver away from the village, sandungs are located in the center of villages. Some sandungs are hundreds years old. A collection of sandungs are kept in the Balanga Museum, Palangkaraya.

== Tiwah festival ==
The sandung is an integral part of the Tiwah dead festival. The Tiwah is the most important festival of the Ngaju people, where the soul of the dead is ensured safe journey to paradise. During the Tiwah ceremony, the bones of the dead are dug from the cemetery and carried back to the village. The bones will be purified, cleaned and anointed with oil and gold dust by their closest kin e.g. their children or their grandchildren. After the purification, the bones are carefully wrapped in cloth and placed in the sandung.

== Modernity ==
Since the mid-1960s, the increasing availability of cements means that cement ossuaries are becoming more popular. These are usually of sandung munduk type, the type of sandung which stands on ground. Fragments of tile and mirror are pressed into the drying cement to decorate it. As more Dayak people adopt Christianity or Islam, sandung is becoming rarer, but can still be seen in a few place of Central Borneo/Kalimantan. Many ancient sandung and sapundu (mortuary pole) are stolen because of their historic value.

== Gallery ==
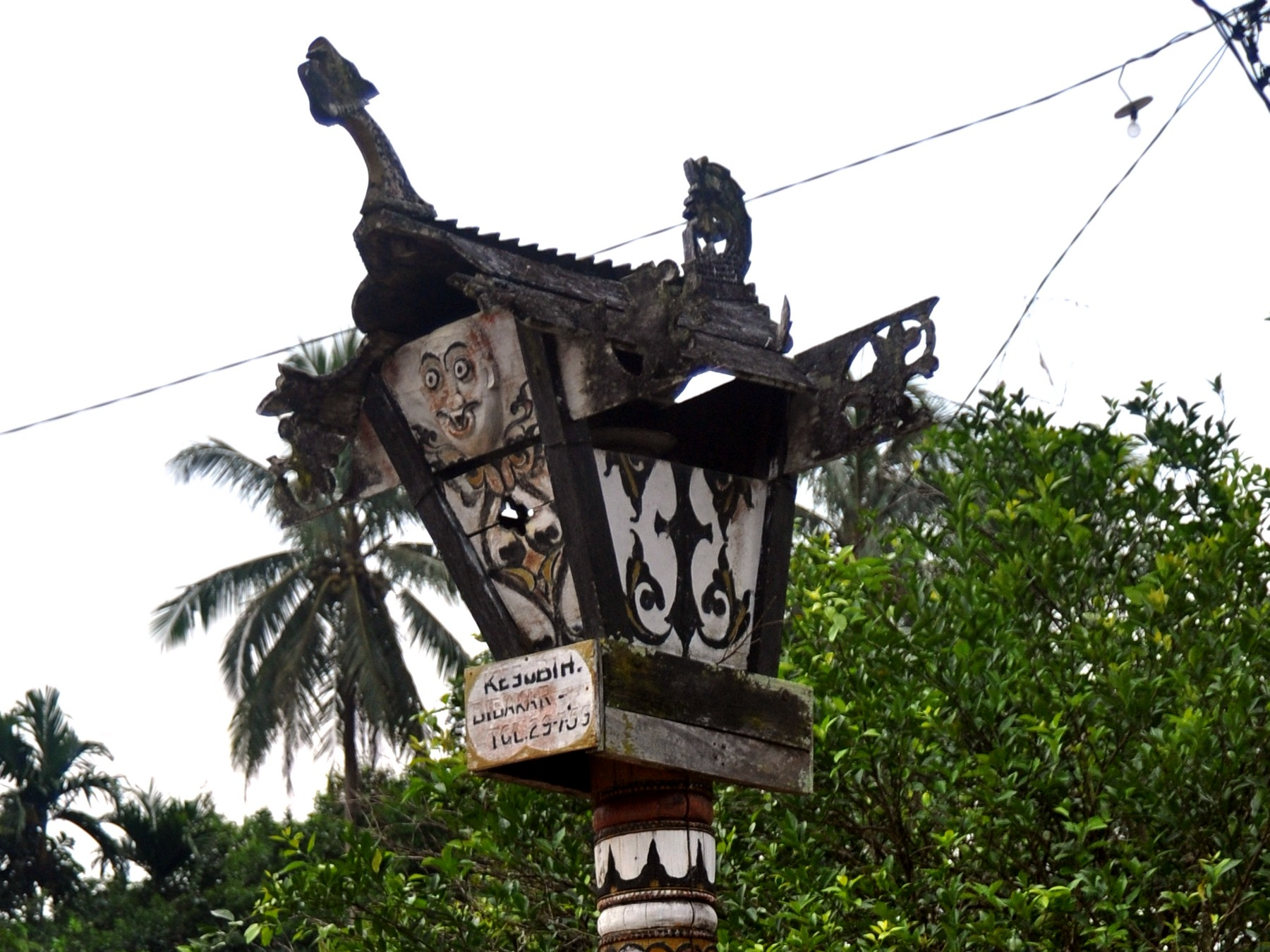
Sandung Tunggal in Ketapang, West Kalimantan

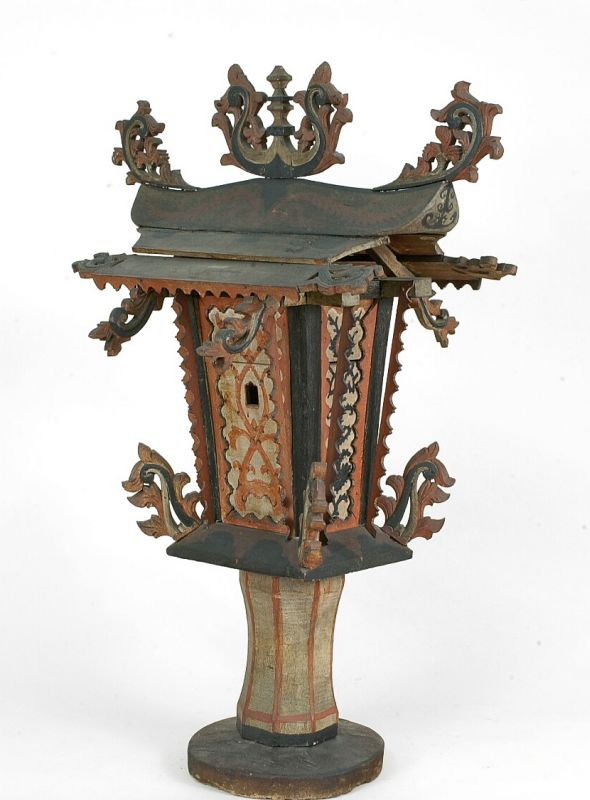
Sandung Tunggal in a museum collection

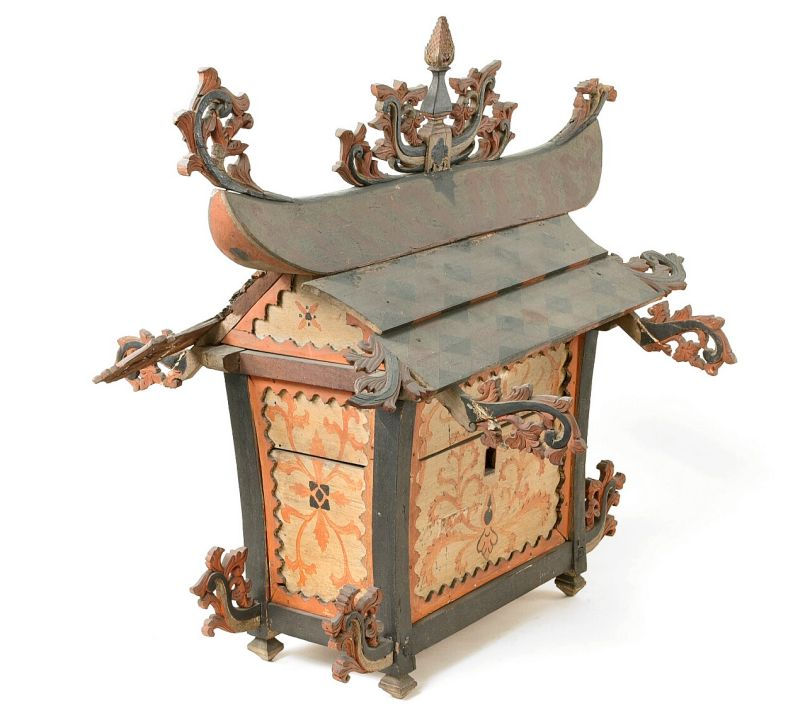
Sandung Munduk without wooden pole

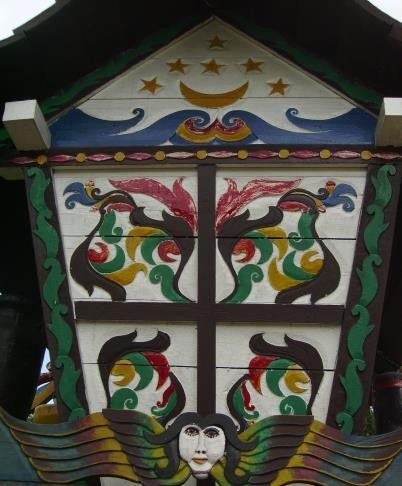
Side of a Sandung filled with paintings of crescent moon, stars, and celestial spirit with two wings

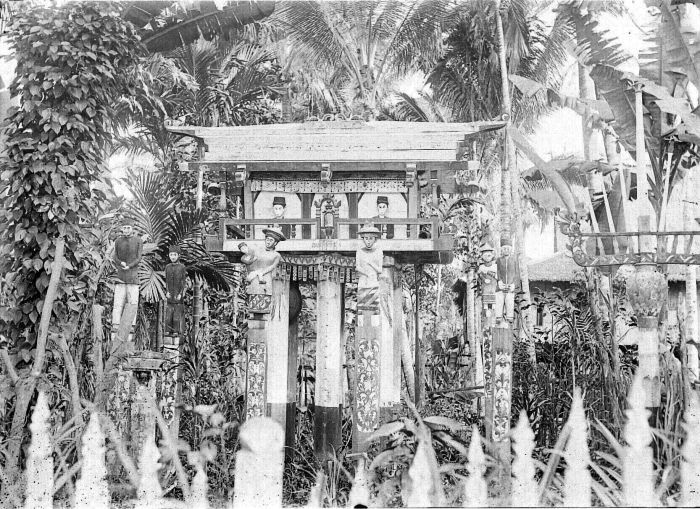
Historical image of a Sandung surrounded by Sapundu

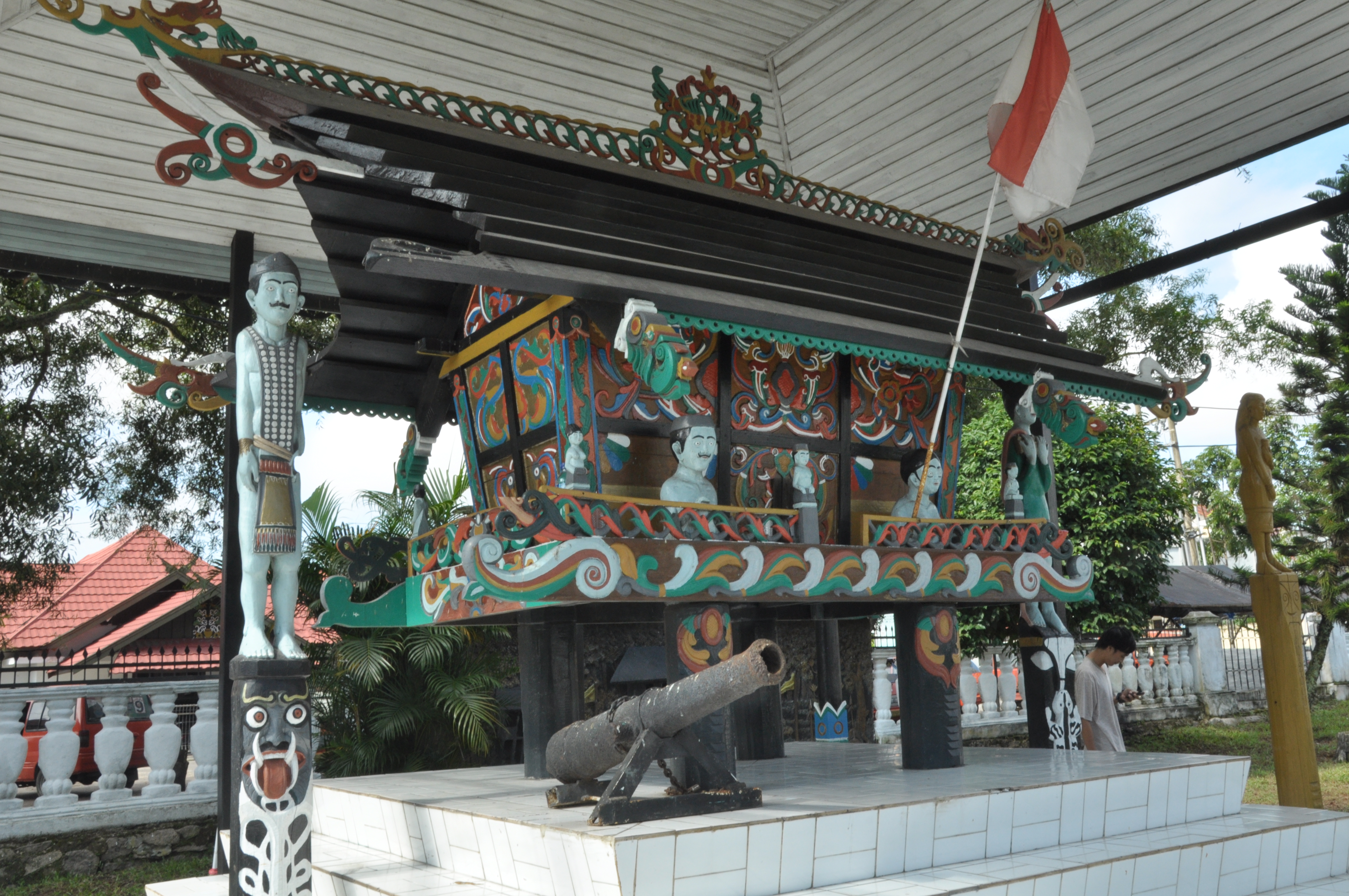
A Sandung Raja in Palangka Raya city

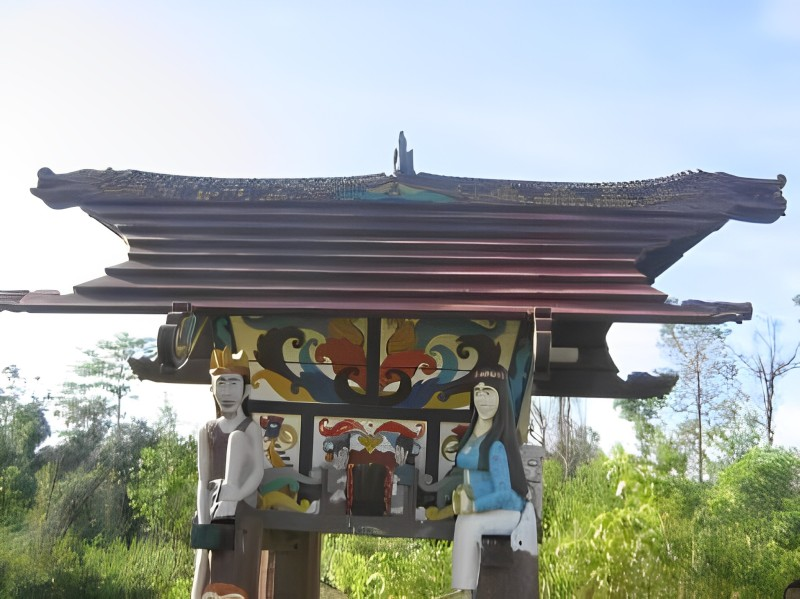
Sandung with four wooden poles

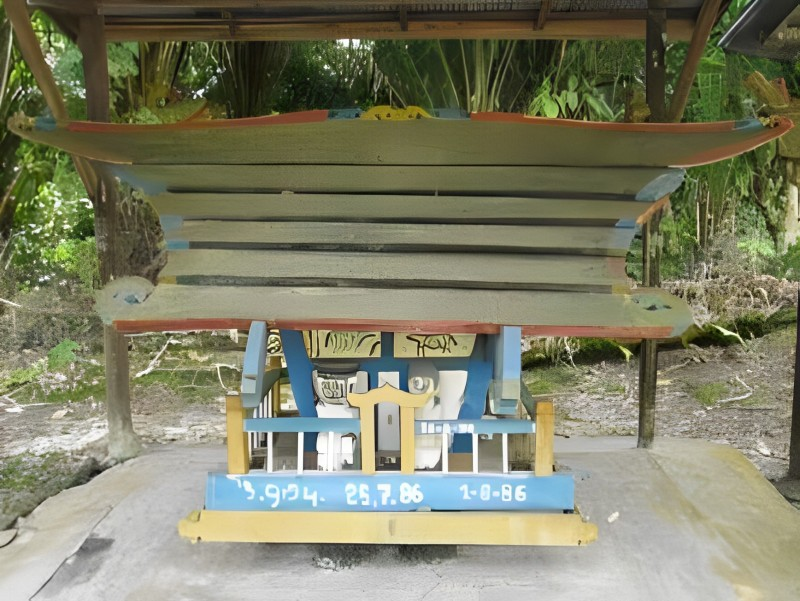
Sandung Munduk without any poles and put directly on the ground

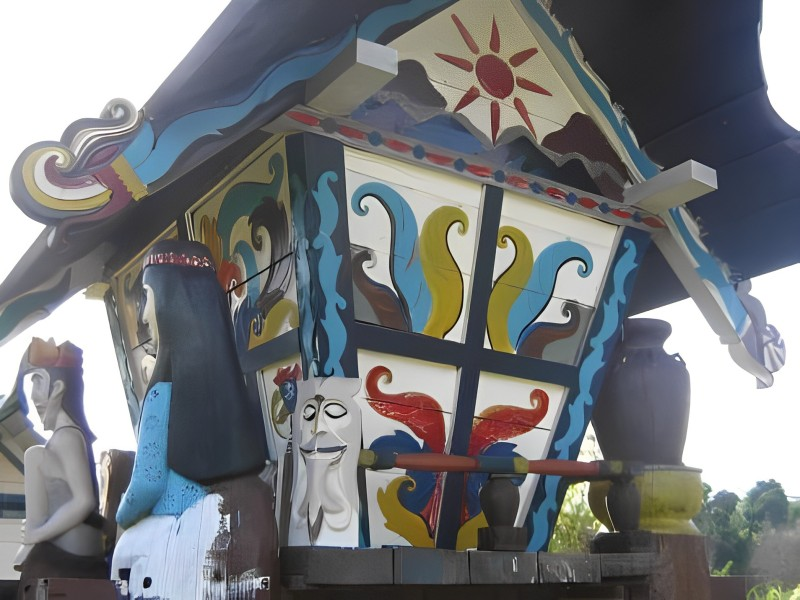
Side of a Sandung filled with a painting of sun

== See also ==
- pātaka – stilted food storehouse made among the Māori of New Zealand

== Cited works ==
- Mersat, Neilson Ilan (Dec 2021). "Collective Memories and Narratives of Iban Kua'". Jurnal Borneo Arkhailogia (Heritage, Archaeology and History). 6 (1). Universiti Malaysia Sarawak: 107–119. doi:10.51200/jba.v6i1.3519 (inactive 12 July 2025). ISSN 2600-8726.
- Metcalf, Peter (1999). Fox, James J. (ed.). Religion and Ritual: Secondary Mortuary Rituals. Indonesian Heritage. Singapore: Archipelago Press. ISBN 9813018585.
- Metcalf, David; Brookes, Stephanie (2014). Indonesia's Hidden Heritage. Jakarta: NOW! Jakarta Publications. ISBN 9786029797152.
- Schiller, Anne (1997). Small Sacrifices: Religious Change and Cultural Identity among the Ngaju of Indonesia. Oxford: Oxford University Press. ISBN 9780195357325.
- Waterson, Roxana (1999). Gunawan Tjahjono (ed.). Architecture: Houses for the Dead. Indonesian Heritage. Singapore: Archipelago Press. ISBN 9813018585.
