= Ngaju =

Ngaju may refer to:

- Ngaju people
- Ngaju language
