= Kurung-kurung =

Indonesian musical instrument made of bamboo

Percussion instrument
- Classification: Idiophone
- Inventor(s): Meratus Dayak and Banjarese
- Developed: Indonesia (South Kalimantan)

Kurung-kurung is a traditional Banjar musical instrument originating from South Kalimantan, Indonesia. The instrument is made of bamboo which is hollowed and tuned to produce a specific note. It makes a sound after being pounded vertically to the ground, and usually a group of people with one kurung-kurung each play in turn to create rhythmic sequences.

Originally, this instrument was played by Meratus Dayak cultivators when planting rice together. The top end of the bamboo is shaped in such a way as to resemble an angklung musical instrument. At the bottom end there is a wooden peg, bound to the bamboo with rattan.

The wooden peg serves to make holes in the ground to insert rice seeds during farming activities. When a stick of bamboo is pounded into the ground to make a hole, a tone is created. When the cultivators planted rice together, the men pounded (kurung kurung) to create a rhythm, making holes in the ground while creating music. Meanwhile, the women sow the seeds in the holes where the instruments had made holes.

More recently, kurung-kurung are no longer tools for farming. However, this instrument is still played during traditional ceremonies. In addition, Kurung-kurung are also displayed as artistic objects. This musical instrument is played by performing artistic groups in a Kurung Kurung Hantak performance.

== See also ==
- Angklung
- Kolintang
- Music of Indonesia
