= Ma'anyan people =

Ethnic group in Indonesia

Ma'anyan people Dusun Ma'anyan / Dayak Ma'anyan / Eastern Barito Dayak
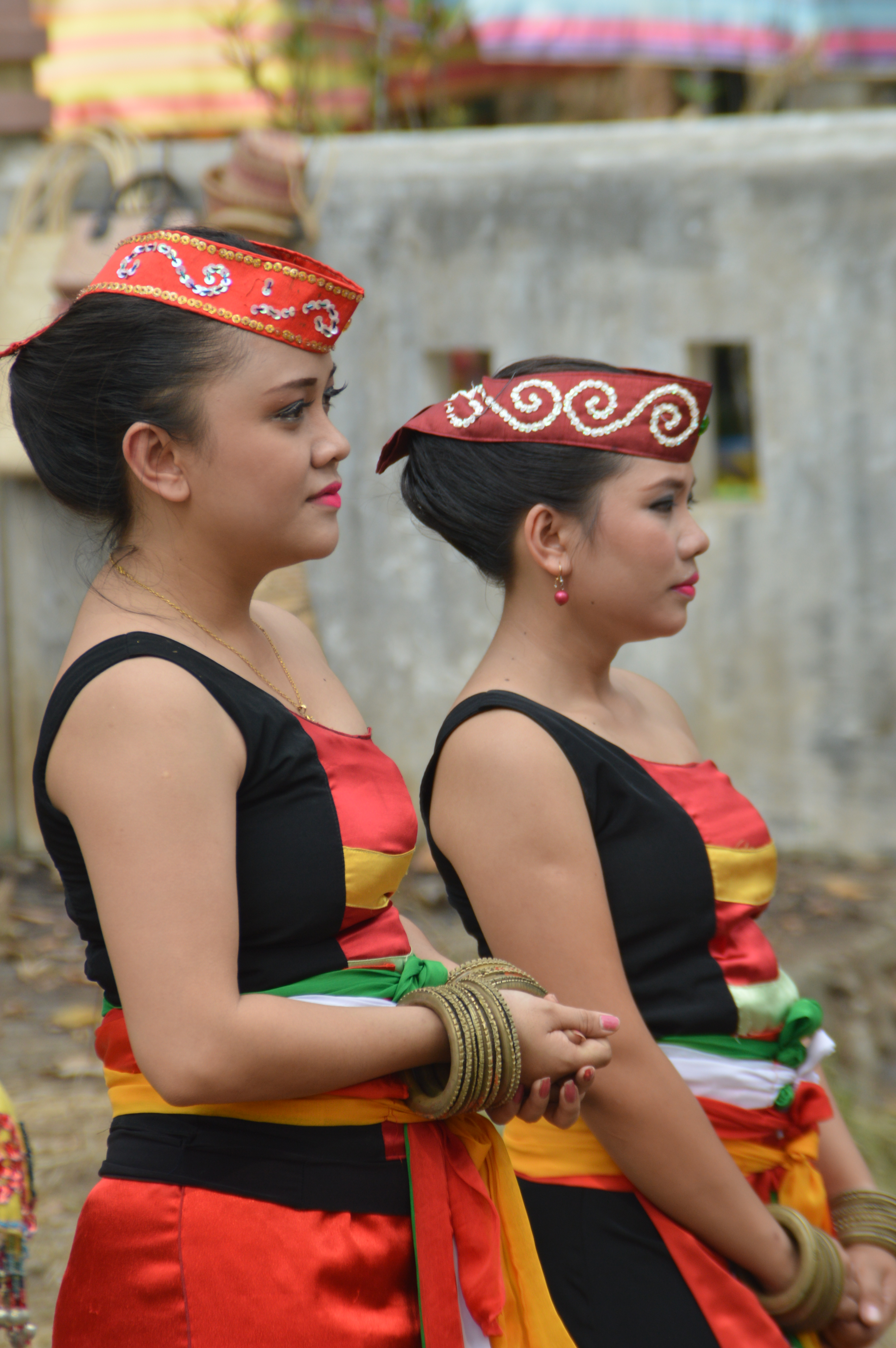
- Ma'anyan women at Keang Ethnic Festival.

Total population
- Approximately 85,000

Regions with significant populations
- Indonesia
- Central Kalimantan: 71,000
- South Kalimantan: 10,000

Languages
- Ma'anyan language, Ngaju language, Banjar language, East Barito languages, Indonesian language

Religion
- Christianity (Protestant & Roman Catholic) 86%, Kaharingan 10%, Islam (Sunni) 5%

Related ethnic groups
- Dayak people (Ot Danum, Lawangan, Ngaju, Dusun Balangan, Meratus), Malagasy people, Banjar people

The Ma'anyan (colonial spelling Maanjan or Meanjan), Dayak Maanyan or Eastern Barito Dayak, are an ethnic group of the Dayak people indigenous to Borneo. They are also considered as part of the east Barito Dusun group with the name Dusun Ma'anyan. According to J. Mallinckrodt (1927), the Dusun people group is part of the Ot Danum people cluster, although later that theory was disproved by A. B. Hudson (1967), who argues that the Ma'anyan people are a branch of the Barito family. The Ma'anyan people who are often referred to as Dayak people are also referred to as Dayak Ma'anyan. The Dayak Ma'anyan people inhabit the east side of Central Kalimantan, especially in the East Barito Regency and parts of South Barito Regency which are grouped as Ma'anyan I.

The Dayak Ma'anyan people also inhabit the northern parts of South Kalimantan, especially in Tabalong Regency which refers to the Dayak Warukin people. The Dayak Balangan people or Dusun Balangan people which are found in the Balangan Regency and the Dayak Samihim people that are found in the Kotabaru Regency are grouped together with the Dayak Ma'anyan people group. The Dayak Ma'anyan people in South Kalimantan are grouped as Ma'anyan II.

Administratively, the Ma'anyan people have just recently appeared in the 2000 census and made up 2.8% of the Central Kalimantan population; previously the Ma'anyan people were grouped together with the Dayak people in the 1930 census.

The uniqueness of the Dusun Ma'anyan people among others are agriculture, elaborate funeral ceremonies, and having shaman to treat their disease.

== History ==
The independent state of Nansarunai, established by the Ma'anyan prior to the 12th century, flourished in southern Kalimantan. The kingdom suffered two major attacks from the Majapahit forces that caused the decline and fall of the kingdom by the year 1389; the attacks are known as Nansarunai Usak Jawa (meaning "the destruction of the Nansarunai by the Javanese") in the oral accounts of the Ma'anyan people. These attacks contributed to the migration of the Ma'anyans to the Central and South Borneo region.

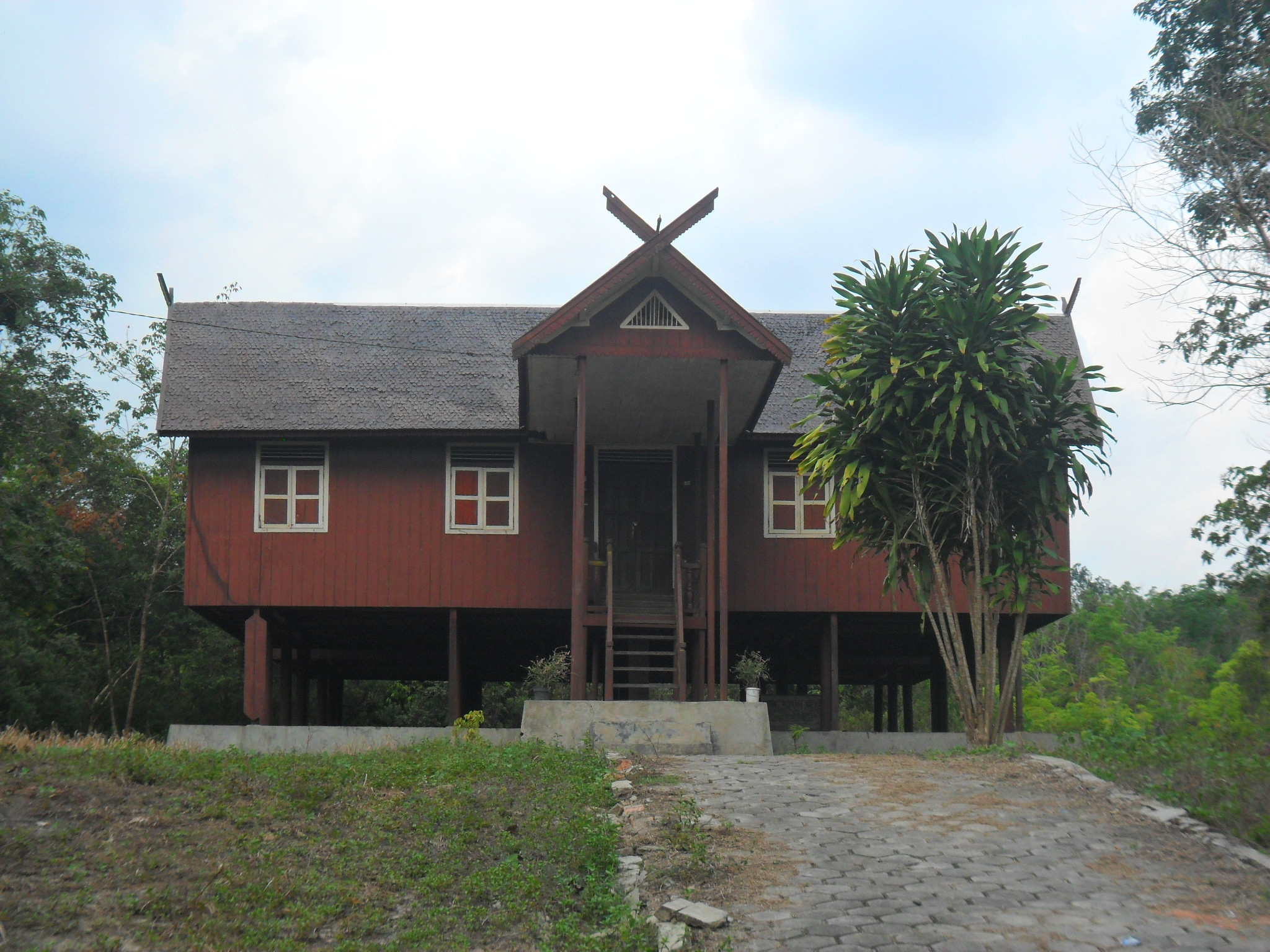
Rumah Betang, a traditional Ma'anyan house in Muara Bagok, East Barito Regency, Central Kalimantan.

Ma'anyan people (or other indigenous people of Kalimantan closely related to the Ma'anyans) were brought as labourer and slaves by Malay and Javanese in their trading fleets, which reached Madagascar by ca. 50–500 AD. The Malagasy language originated from the Southeast Barito language, and the Ma'anyan language is its closest relative, with numerous Malay and Javanese loanwords.

In the oral literature of the Ma'anyan people, after the Nan Sarunai kingdom was attacked by the Majapahit kingdom, the Ma'anyan people broke up into several sub-group. Among the sub-groups, they are:-

- Ma'anyan Paku
- Ma'anyan Paju Epat/Ampat or Ma'anyan Siong
- Ma'anyan Dayu Lasi Muda
- Ma'anyan Paju Sapuluh of Kampung Sapuluh (had Banjarese influence)
- Ma'anyan Banua Lima or Paju Dime (had Banjarese influence)
  - Ma'anyan Warukin (had Banjarese influence)
  - Ma'anyan Jangkung (extinct and had Banjarese influence)

According to the Ma'anyan people, before they had begun occupying the current regions, they came from the downstream of South Kalimantan. Although today the East Barito Regency is not part of the South Kalimantan province, that region in the past was the last region to be a part of the Banjar sultanate before it was annexed to the Dutch Indies in 1860. It was a region of the Banjar sultanate that had shrunk and was land-locked as it was surrounded by other Dutch Indies territories.

== Culture ==
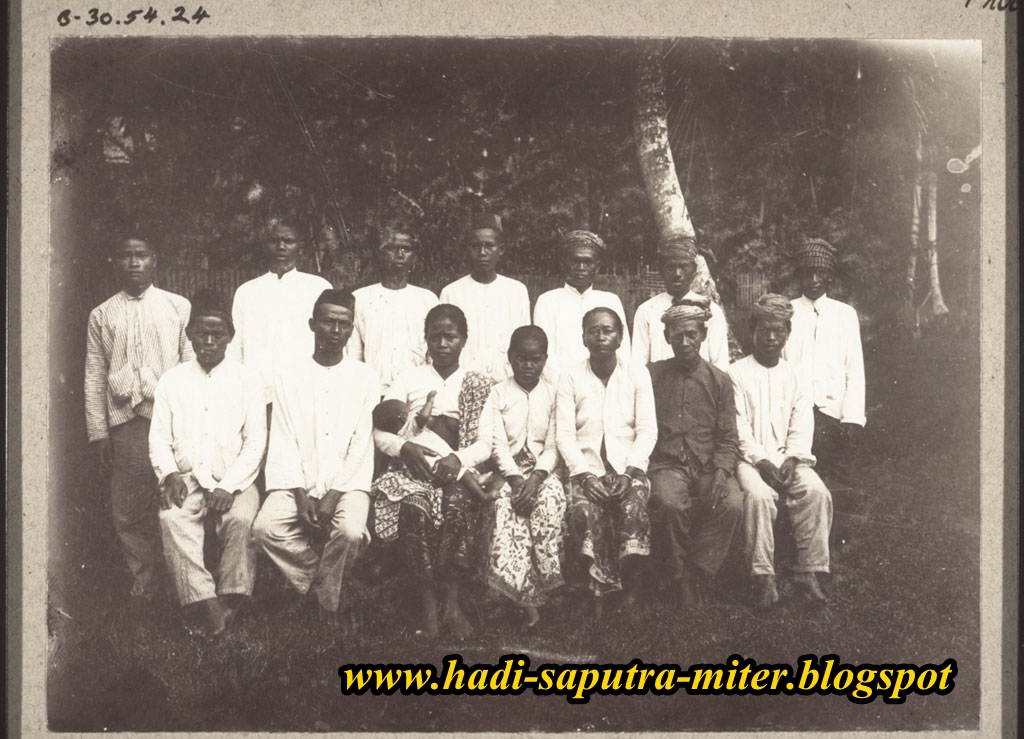
A group of Ma'anyan people who had recently been baptized in the 1920s.

=== Language ===
The Ma'anyan language shares many similarities with the languages in Madagascar. Examples of Ma'anyan words are:-

Ma'anyan language	Malagasy language	English language
Hanyu	Ianao	You
Mandrus	Mandro	Bath
Manree	Mandry (to lay by ext. to sleep)	Sleep
Midi	Mividy	Buy
Tadi	Tady	Rope
Warik	Varika ('lemur')	Monkey
Kakau	Kakazo	Tree - piece of wood
Wurung	Vorona	Bird

=== Organization ===
The organization of the Ma'anyan people is "Dusmala" which combines three Dayak people sub-group which are Dusun people, Ma'anyan people and Lawangan people.

=== Traditional folk song ===
- Tumpi Wayu
- Tataku Balinga
- Miheput
- Ngano

=== Traditional dance ===
- Tari Giring-Giring

=== Traditional ceremony ===
- Aruh Buntang

=== Food ===
- Bagamat, a giant bat meat gravy cooked with garlic and various vegetables.
- Kalumpe or Karuang by the Ngaju people, a pounded Cassava leaf salad mixed with eggplant, lemongrass, onion and garlic.

== Ma'anyan people in Tabalong Regency and Balangan Regency in South Kalimantan ==
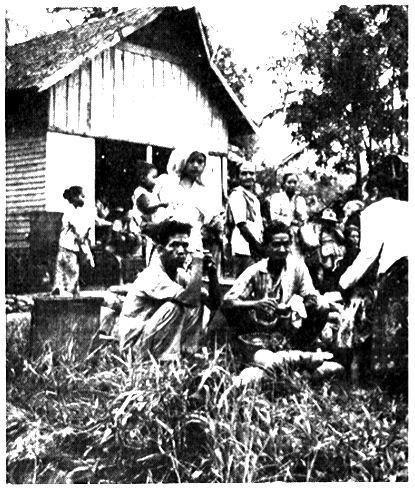
Ma'anyan people in a fruit market in Telang, 1963.

The Dayak Ma'anyan Warukin people whom are often referred as Dayak Warukin people are the sub-ethnic of the Ma'anyan people group living in villages such as Warukin, Haus and its surrounding in Tabalong Regency, South Kalimantan. The settlements of the Dayak Warukin are found in regions where its surroundings are Banjarese settlements. The Dayak Warukin in Warukin village in Tanta District, Tabalong Regency are part of the Ma'anyan Banua Lima people. The Ma'anyan Banua Lima people are a sub-ethnic of the Ma'anyan people found in Banua Lima, East Barito Regency. The original name of the people was Ma'anyan Paju Lima. The word "Banua" (literally means, continent) came from the Banjar language. The funeral ceremony of the Dayak Warukin people according to the Kaharingan religion is called mambatur, or marabia for the Ma'anyan Banua Lima people.

The similarities of the Ma'anyan Warukin language with the Banjar language of Kuala Lupak are about 50%. While the similarities of the Ma'anyan Warukin language with the Banjar language of Asam-Asam village are about 57%.

There are four regions of Dayak culture in Tabalong Regency, where one of its region is of Dayak Ma'anyan culture, namely:-

- Cultural region of Dayak Ma'anyan in Warukin village.
- Cultural region of Dayak Deyah of Kampung Sapuluh, which covers ten villages in Upau, Haruai and Bintang Ara districts.
- Cultural region of Dayak Deyah of Muara Uya and Jaro.
- Cultural region of Dayak Lawangan of Binjai village.

Outside of the four Dayak cultural regions in Tabalong Regency, there are also Banjar people who form as the majority of the Tabalong Regency population and these Banjar people are not bound by Dayak customary laws.
