= Lawangan people =

Ethnic group of Dayak Dusun people

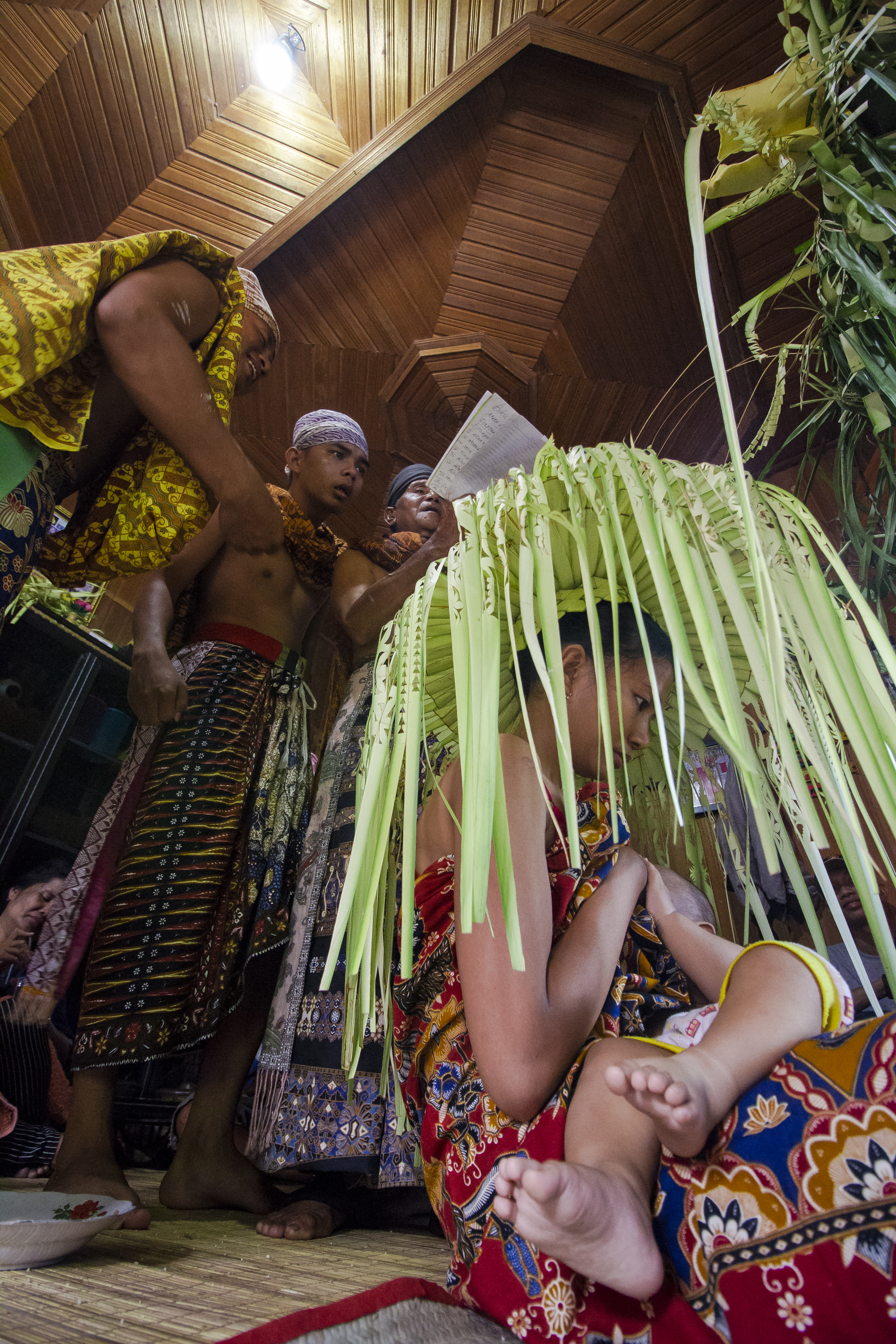
- Traditional event in the Dayak Sub-Tribe of Lawangan, East Barito Regency, Central Kalimantan

Regions with significant populations
- 119,000; Central Kalimantan: 100,000; East Kalimantan: 16,000; South Kalimantan: 3,000

Languages
- Lawangan, Maʼanyan, Banjarese, and Indonesian

Religion
- Kaharingan (predominantly), Christianity

Related ethnic groups
- Ot Danum • Paser • Dusun Deyah • Benuaq • Bentian • Tunjung • Tawoyan • Ngaju • Ma'anyan

Lawangan or Luangan people are an Dayak ethnic group of the Dusun people (East Barito) group, sometimes also referred to as Dusun Lawangan or Dayak Lawangan. The Lawangan people inhabit the eastern side of Central Kalimantan and East Kalimantan, Indonesia. In Tabalong Regency, South Kalimantan, the Lawangan people can be found only in Binjai village. They speak Lawangan language, belonging to the Northeast Barito branch.

The organization of this people is Dusmala which is made up of three Dayak sub-ethnic namely, Dusun, Ma'anyan, and Lawangan. Most of them are followers of Kaharingan, the local religion of the Dayaks. However, since the Dutch colonial era, especially after Indonesian independence, many of them converted to religions officially recognized by the Indonesian government, especially Christianity.

the Lawangan people are still related to the Ngaju people.

== Lawangan subgroups ==
The subgroups of the Lawangan people are:

- Benuaq
- Bentian
- Bawo
- Tunjung
- Paser (sometimes considered an ethnic group in its own right; the Malayized Dayaks)
- Tawoyan (77% similarity in language)
- Dusun Deyah (53% similarity in language)

== Etymology ==
=== Derived from the name of the Luang River ===
According to local traditions, the ancestors of this tribe came from an area called Oleng Owon, located on the banks of the Luang River. It was from this river name that the words "Luangan" or "Lawangan" were coined to refer to the group of people who inhabited the area.

=== Comes from the word "Lobang" ===
In local language, the word "Lawangan" or "Luangan" is also believed to have its roots in the word "lobang." This term refers to the geographical or historical clues to their early settlements, which are related to certain cave or hole areas in the interior of Kalimantan.

== Culture ==
=== Food ===
- Bagamat, a giant bat meat gravy cooked with garlic and various vegetables.

== Customary region ==
Tabalong Regency is made up of four Dayak cultural region, where one of them includes the customary region of the Lawangan people, which are:-

- Binjai village, the customary region of the Lawangan people
- Warukin village, the customary region of the Ma'anyan people
- The ten villages that compose Upau district, Haruai district and Bintang Ara district, the customary region of the Denyah Kampung Sepuluh people
- Muara Uya district and Jaro district, the customary region of the Denyah people

Outside of these four Dayak customary regions in Tabalong Regency, there are also the Banjar people which forms the majority of the Tabalong population, although the Banjar people are not tied to the customary laws of the Dayak people.
