= Balanga Museum =

Museum in Central Kalimantan, Indonesia

- Location in Kalimantan
- Established: 1973
- Location: Palangkaraya, Central Kalimantan, Indonesia
- Coordinates: 2°11′43″S 113°54′6″E

Balanga Museum is a museum in Palangkaraya, Central Kalimantan, Indonesia. The museum has a notable collection of regional Indonesian artifacts, providing an insight into Kalimantan's indigenous cultures. The central building of the museum has items related to Ngaju ceremonies, and the museum has an array of musical instruments, facemasks, swords, porcelain pots and other ceramics.

The museum also contains carved birthing stools and benches, slings and hammocks for babies and the sequined clothing for weddings. It also has a small collection of sandung or bonehouses next to the rows of gongs and musical instruments.

== See also ==
- List of museums and cultural institutions in Indonesia
