= Bakumpai language =

Austronesian language spoken in Kalimantan, Indonesia

Bakumpai
- Native to: Indonesia
- Region: Kalimantan
- Ethnicity: Bakumpai
- Native speakers: 100,000 (2003)
- Language family: Austronesian: Malayo-Polynesian; West Barito; South; Bakumpai
- Dialects: Berangas (?)

Language codes
- ISO 639-3: bkr
- Glottolog: baku1263
- Map showing distribution of Bakumpai language (blue)

Bakumpai is an Austronesian language belonging to the West Barito languages. It is spoken by about 100,000 Bakumpai people (a subgroup of Dayak people) living in the central Kalimantan, Indonesia.

Neighbouring ethnic groups are Banjar people, Ngaju people, and Ma'anyan people. Thus there is high lexical similarity with the neighbouring languages (75% with Ngaju, 45% with Banjar). In addition, Berangas language who endangered is also very similar to Bakumpai, possibly a dialect.

== Vocabulary comparison ==
The following is a vocabulary comparison between the closely related Bakumpai and Ngaju languages, as well as Indonesian and its translation into English.

Bakumpai	Ngaju	Indonesian	Gloss
jida	dia	tidak	no
beken	beken	bukan	not
pai	pai	kaki	leg
kueh	kueh	mana	where
si kueh	bara kueh	dari mana	from where
hituh	hetuh	sini	here
si hituh	intu hetuh	di sini	right here
bara	bara	dari	from
kejaw	kejaw	jauh	far
tukep, parak	tukep	dekat	near
kuman	kuman	makan	eat
mihup	mihop	minum	drink
lebu	lewu	kampung	village
batatapas	bapukan	cuci	wash (clothes)
