= Kongsat =

Total population
- 100 (est.)

Regions with significant populations
- Laos

Languages
- Lao, Lu

Religion
- Animism

The Kongsat people are an ethnic group in Laos.

== Geographic distribution ==
- Population of approximately 100 in Oudomxai Province of Laos (They inhabit the single village of Nam Nyon Village in Namo District)

== Origin ==
The Kongsat claim that they originated in the Yunnan Province of China. They are a Tai ethnic group.

== Culture ==
The Kongsat have largely assimilated Lao and Lu customs.

=== Language ===
The Kongsat are multilingual in Yang, Lao, Lue, Khmu, Pounyot.

=== Religion ===
The Kongsat practice animism.

=== Celebrations ===
- Celebration of the Tiger (Day of the Tiger according to the traditional 13-day calendar)
- New Year (celebrated on the 7th day of the first lunar month)
- Birth ceremonies
- House construction ceremonies
