= Ot Danum language =

Austronesian language spoken in Kalimantan, Indonesia

Ot Danum
- Dohoi
- Native to: Indonesia
- Region: Kalimantan
- Ethnicity: Ot Danum people
- Native speakers: 79,000 (2007)
- Language family: Austronesian: Malayo-Polynesian; West Barito; North; Ot Danum

Language codes
- ISO 639-3: otd
- Glottolog: otda1235

Ot Danum is a Barito language of the central Borneo, Indonesia, spoken by the Ot Danum people. Dialects include Cihie and Dohoi.

== Phonology ==
=== Consonants ===
		Labial	Alveolar	(Alveolo-) palatal	Velar	Glottal
Nasal		m	n	ɲ	ŋ	
Plosive/ Affricate	voiceless	p	t	t͡ɕ	k	
Plosive/ Affricate	voiced	b	d	d͡ʑ	g	
Fricative		β	(s)	ɕ		h
Rhotic	trill		r			
Rhotic	tap		ɾ			
Approximant				j		

- /ɕ/ may also be heard as [s] in free variation. In word-final position, it can be approximantized as [ɕ̞].
- /ɾ/ can be heard as [l] in word-final position.
- Prenasalization is said to also occur among voiced stops /b, d, d͡ʑ, ɡ/ in word-initial and intervocalic positions as [ᵐb, ⁿd, ᶮd͡ʑ, ᵑɡ].
- Stop sounds /p, t, k/ in word-final position are heard as unreleased [p̚, t̚, k̚].
- /h/ is heard as labialized [hʷ] when occurring anywhere within the position of /u/, and heard as a fronted velar [x̟] when occurring in the position of /i/.

==== Consonant fronting ====
Consonant fronting as well as laminalizing occurs among the following consonants when anywhere within the position of /i/. The allophones are heard as following:

Phoneme	Allophone
/t/	[t̪]
/d/	[ⁿ̪d̪], [d̪]
/n/	[n̪]
/r/	[r̪]
/ɾ/	[ɾ̪]
/nd/	[n̪d̪]
/t͡ɕ/	[t͡ɕ̻]
/d͡ʑ/	[ᶮ̻d͡ʑ̻], [d͡ʑ̻]
/ɕ/	[ɕ̻]
/ɲ/	[ɲ̻]
/j/	[j̟]
/k/	[k̟]
/ɡ/	[ᵑ̟ɡ̟], [ɡ̟]
/ŋ/	[ŋ̟]
/h/	[x̟]

=== Vowels ===
	Front	Central	Back
Close	i		u
Mid	e		o
Open		a	

- /a/ can also be heard as [ɐ] in free variation.
- /i, u/ are heard as [ɪ, ʊ] when preceding a vowel.
