= Tabalong Regency =

Regency in South Kalimantan, Indonesia

Coordinates: 1.8833°S 115.5000°E

Tabalong Regency Kabupaten Tabalong
- Regency

Other transcription(s)
  - Jawi: تابلوڠ
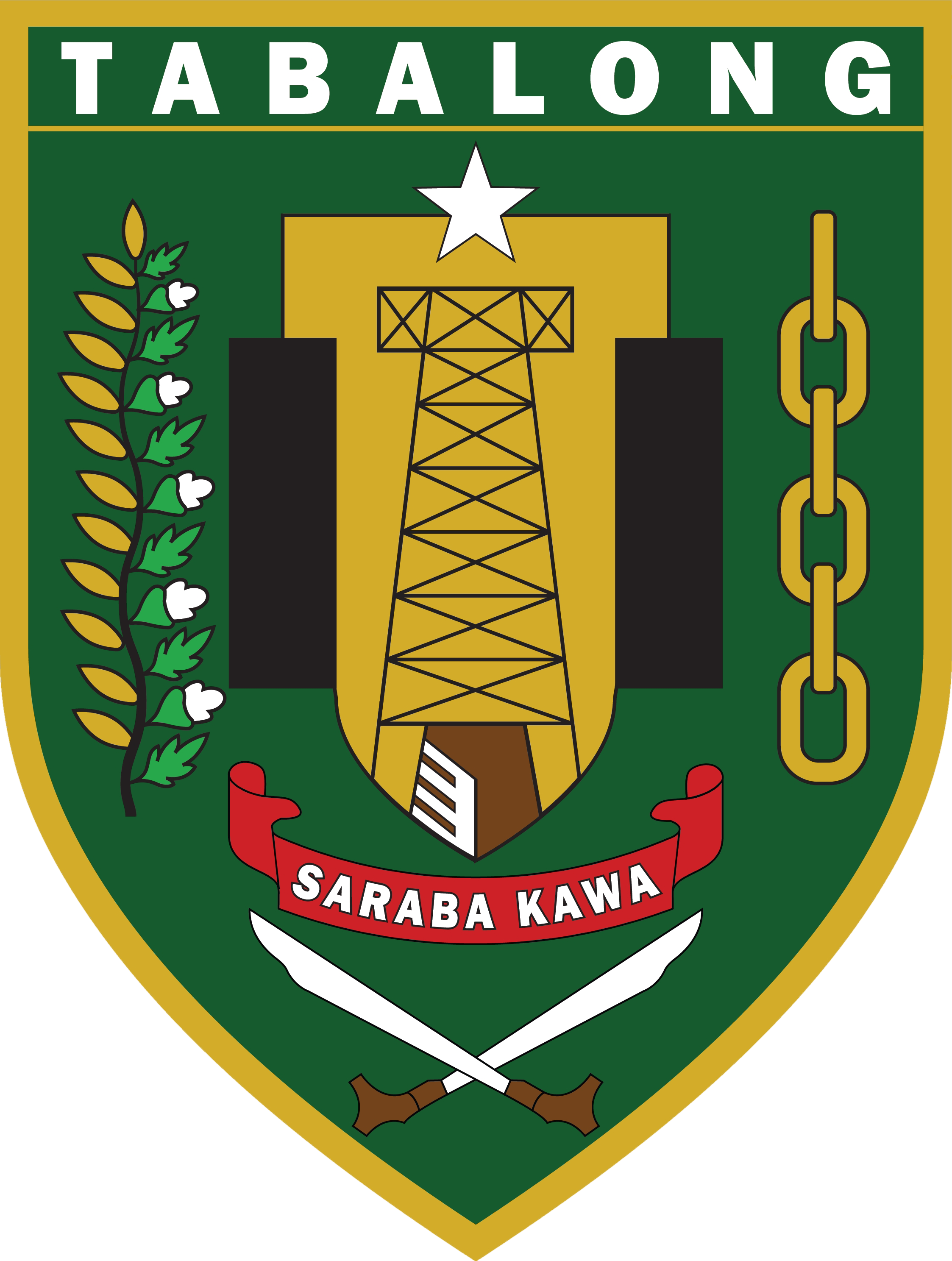
- Coat of arms
- Motto: Saraba Kawa (Banjarese) (Versatile)
- Country: Indonesia
- Province: South Kalimantan
- Capital: Tanjung

Government
  - Regent: Muhammad Noor Rifani
  - Vice Regent: Habib Muhammad Taufani Alkaf

Area
  - Total: 3,553.36 km^{2} (1,371.96 sq mi)

Population (mid 2025 estimate)
  - Total: 271,216
  - Density: 76.3266/km^{2} (197.685/sq mi)
- Time zone: UTC+8 (WITA)
- Area code: +62 526
- HDI (2019): ▲0.718 (High)
- Website: tabalongkab.go.id

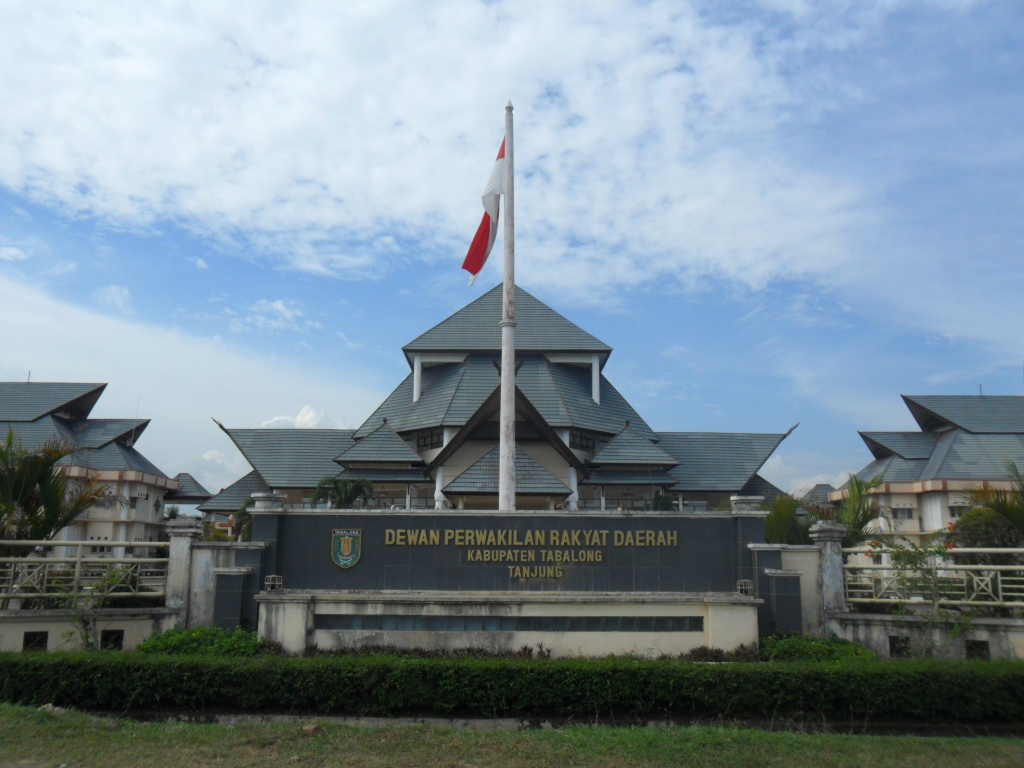
Tabalong Regency

Tabalong Regency is the northernmost regency in the Indonesian province of South Kalimantan, on Borneo Island. It was created on 14 July 1965 by splitting off the former northern districts of North Hulu Sungai Regency. It has a land area of 3,553.36 km^{2}, and had a population at the 2010 Census of 218,620 and 253,305 at the 2020 Census; the official estimate as of mid 2025 was 271,216 (comprising 137,096 males and 134,120 females). The administrative capital is the town of Tanjung. The Regency's motto is "Saraba Kawa" (versatile in Banjarese).

== Administrative divisions ==
The Regency is divided into twelve districts (Indonesian: kecamatan), tabulated below with their areas and population totals from the 2010 Census, and the 2020 Census, together with the official estimates for mid 2025. The table also includes the locations of the district administrative centres, the number of administrative villages in each district (a total of 121 rural desa and 10 urban kelurahan), and its postal codes.

Kode Wilayah	Name of District (kecamatan)	Area in km^{2}	Pop'n Census 2010	Pop'n Census 2020	Pop'n Estimate mid 2025	Admin centre	No. of villages	Post codes
63.09.01	Banua Lawas	150.86	17,997	20,201	21,667	Banua Lawas	15	71553 ^{(a)}
63.09.09	Pugaan	31.87	6,479	7,443	7,980	Halangan	7	71554
63.09.02	Kelua	53.39	22,628	24,911	26,182	Pulau	12 ^{(b)}	71552
63.09.08	Muara Harus	26.78	5,901	6,795	7,343	Tantaringin	7	71555
63.09.03	Tanta	149.73	17,204	22,168	25,119	Tanta	14	71561
63.09.04	Tanjung	191.69	32,440	35,899	38,146	Jangkung	15 ^{(c)}	71515 ^{(d)}
63.09.06	Murung Pudak	172.48	44,688	56,790	60,824	Belimbing Raya	10 ^{(e)}	71571
63.09.05	Haruai	271.97	20,416	23,688	24,889	Halong	13	71570
63.09.12	Bintang Ara	1,170.19	7,935	9,146	9,759	Uish	9	71572
63.09.10	Upau	183.01	7,046	7,366	7,960	Pangelak	6	71575
63.09.07	Muara Uya	877.13	21,689	23,839	25,276	Muara Uya	14	71573
63.09.11	Jaro	274.26	14,197	15,059	16,071	Jaro	9	71574
	Totals	3,553.36	218,620	253,903	271,216	Tanjung	131	

Notes: (a) except the village of Sungai Durian (postcode of 72167). (b) including one kelurahan - the town of Pulau. (c) including 4 kelurahan - Agung, Hikun, Jangkung and Tanjung. (d) except the town of Tanjung (postcode of 71513) and the towns of Jangkung (postcode of 71512) and Agung (postcode of 71514). (e) including 5 kelurahan - Belimbing, Belimbing Raya, Mabu'un, Pembataan and Sulingan.
