= Ot Danum people =

Ethnic group in Kalimantan, Indonesia

Ot Danum people Dohoi / Malahoi / Uud Danum / Uut Danum
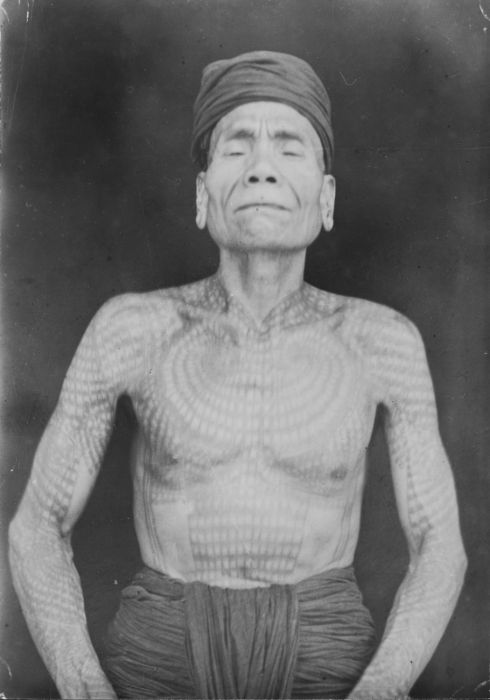
- Portrait of a tattood Ot Danum Dayak man from the Kahajan region of Central Borneo, circa 1898–1900.

Total population
- 94,000

Regions with significant populations
- Indonesia (West Kalimantan, Central Kalimantan)

Languages
- Ot Danum, Indonesian

Religion
- Christianity (Protestant & Roman Catholic) 51%, Kaharingan 38%, Islam (Sunni) 11%

Related ethnic groups
- Dusun, Lawangan, Ma'anyan, Ngaju

Ot Danum (also known as Dohoi, Malahoi, Uud Danum or Uut Danum) people are an ethnicity of the Dayak peoples (hence also referred as Dayak Ot Danum) dwelling at the upper reaches of south Kapuas River, and along the Schwaner range, bordering West Kalimantan and Central Kalimantan, Indonesia. They are the most important group of the upper Melawi River and culturally and linguistically the most distinct from the Malay people. Besides the Malay people, the Ot Danum people are also linguistically distinct from the Ngaju people who live along the middle reaches of Central Kalimantan's great rivers and who are numerically and linguistically the dominant Dayak people group in the area. Just like most Dayak people groups, a majority of the Ot Danum people also practice the Kaharingan religion.

The word Ot means people or upstream, while the word Danum means water. Therefore, the name Ot Danum means "water people" or "upriver people" or "people who live at the upstream river". The Ot Danum people are closely tied to living with nature and would revere the traditions of their ancestors by taking care of the balance between mankind and the surrounding nature.
