= Ngaju people =

Ethnic group of Borneo

Urang Biaju, Urang Ngaju
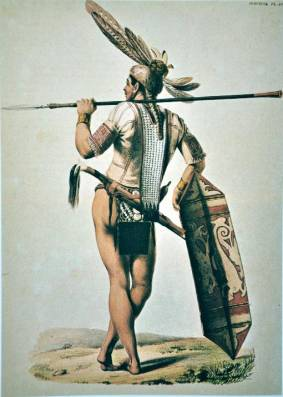
- An illustration of a Dayak Ngaju warrior.

Total population
- 400,000

Regions with significant populations
- Indonesia
- Central Kalimantan: 324,504 (2000)

Languages
- Ngaju, Banjarese, Bakumpai, and Indonesian

Religion
- Christianity (mainly Protestantism), Islam, and Kaharingan

Related ethnic groups
- Dayak people (Bakumpai, Ot Danum, Lawangan, Ma'anyan, and Meratus)

The Ngaju people, also known as Dayak Ngaju or Dayak Biaju, are an indigenous ethnic group of Borneo from the Dayak group. In a census from 2000, when they were first listed as a separate ethnic group, they made up 18.02% of the population of Central Kalimantan province. In an earlier census from 1930, the Ngaju people were included in the Dayak people count. They speak Ngaju language as their mother tongue, and also speak Banjarese language, a widespread lingua franca in Central Kalimantan.

== Subgroups ==
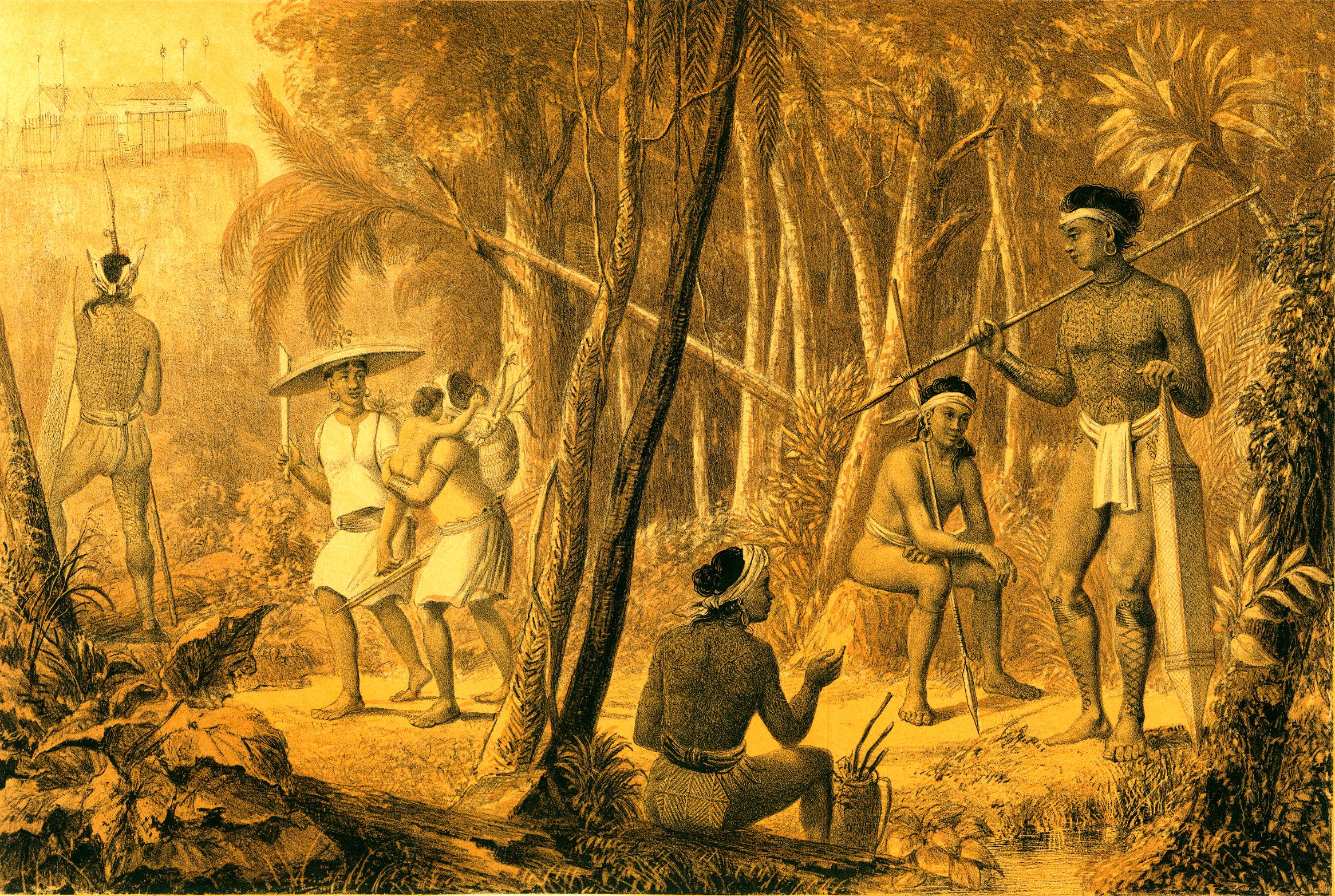
Ngaju people of southern Borneo as depicted by the first explorer to Borneo, Carl Schwaner, 1854.

Based on river stream regions, the Ngaju people are divided into:-

- Greater Batang Biaju – Greater Biaju River
- Lesser Batang Biaju – Lesser Biaju River

Based on language, the Ngaju people are divided into:

- Dayak Ngaju (Central Kalimantan)
- Dayak Kahayan (Central Kalimantan)
- Dayak Katingan (Central Kalimantan)
- Dayak Mendawai (Central Kalimantan)
- Dayak Mengkatip (Central Kalimantan)
- Dayak Siang (Central Kalimantan)
- Dayak Bakumpai (South Kalimantan; considered linguistically and ethnically different)
- Dayak Meratus (South Kalimantan)
- Dayak Berangas (South Kalimantan; which is said to be no longer identifiable and their language is no longer in existence as of 2010 due to assimilation into the mainstream Kuala Banjar people)
- Dayak Beraki (Bara-ki; no longer in existence)

== Culture ==
=== Traditional folk songs ===
- Sinta Takalupe Lunuk
- Karungut, Kalteng Membangun
- Yang Mahakasih (religious song)

=== Traditional cuisines ===
- Kopu, fermented cassava root. Usually eaten by mixing with shredded coconut meat.
- Karuang or Kalumpe by the Ma'anyan people, a pounded Cassava leaf salad mixed with eggplant, lemongrass, onion, and garlic.
- Juhu Umbut Batang Undus, coconut sprout salad eaten with sambal and often served during thanksgiving or wedding ceremonies.

== Notable people ==
- Hausman Baboe, a prominent figure in the Central Kalimantan press and founder of the first daily Suara Dayak Indonesian newspaper.
- Tjilik Riwut, a National Hero of Indonesia, founder of Central Kalimantan, a writer, a Central Kalimantan freedom fighter and former governor of Central Kalimantan.

== See also ==
- View of the tiger
