= Meratus Dayak =

Ethnic group in Indonesia

Meratus Dayak Meratus
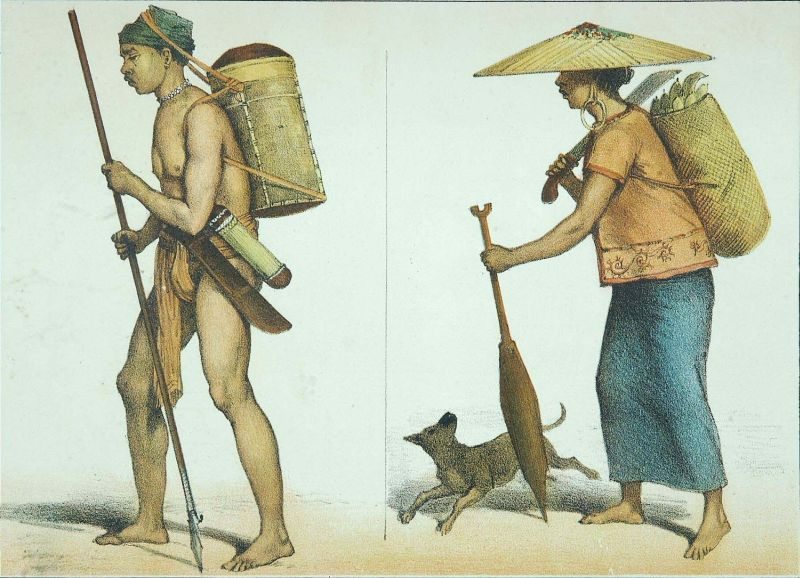
- Lithography by Carl Bock made in 1879 and 1880 about his experiences traveling in eastern and southern Borneo, from Kutai to Banjarmasin in "Orang Bukit from Afdeeling Amoentai" and "Dayak woman from Longwai" written by him.

Total population
- 56,000 (est.2000)

Regions with significant populations
- Indonesia: South Kalimantan (35,383)

Languages
- Bukit Malay, Banjarese, and Indonesian

Religion
- Kaharingan

Related ethnic groups
- Banjar, Dayak, Ngaju

The Meratus or Meratus Dayak is an ethnic group that inhabits the Meratus Mountains of South Kalimantan, Indonesia. The Banjar Kuala people would refer the Meratus people as Urang Baiju or Dayak Baiju, as they consider them to be the same as the Ngaju people. While the Banjar Hulu Sungai people would call the Meratus people as Urang Bukit, Dayak Bukit or Dayak Buguet.

== Naming ==
A Meratus Dayak's name changes over the course of his or her life. Children have "body names" (ngaran badan) that are not usually used after adolescence. When they have children, men and women acquire teknonyms (ngaran ba'anak). For a man this name is Ma X or Pa'an X, where X is the name of one of his children, or sometimes another word. For a woman it is Induan X or Dun X, depending on which part of the Meratus area she lives in. Older men become Awat X (grandfather of X) and older women become Apih X.

== Language ==
Local Meratus Dayak dialects are closely related linguistically to both Indonesian (the national language), and to the Banjar language. Most Meratus Dayak can speak Banjar and Indonesian since government administrators conduct business in Indonesian and trade with the Banjar people is conducted in Banjar.

== Sub-ethnics ==
The Meratus people are divided into several sub-ethnics including:-

- Dayak Pitap people
- Dayak Alai people
  - Dayak Labuhan people
  - Dayak Atiran people
  - Dayak Kiyu people
  - Dayak Juhu people
- Dayak Hantakan (Dayak Bukit) people
- Dayak Labuan Amas people
- Dayak Loksado (Dayak Amandit) people
- Dayak Harakit (Dayak Tapin) people
- Dayak Paramasan people
- Dayak Kayu Tangi people
- Dayak Bangkalaan people
- Dayak Sampanahan people
- Dayak Riam Adungan people
- Dayak Bajuin people
- Dayak Sembamban Baru people
- and many more

== Culture ==
=== Dance ===
- Gintur Dadas dance, a ritualistic dance practiced by the Dayak Meratus Halong people to summon ancestral spirits.
- Batandik, a dance performed to summon ancestral spirits during the Aruh Baharin ritual.

=== Rituals ===
- Aruh Baharin, a ritual also practiced by the Buddhist majority Dayak Balanghan people to close the paddy farming season after the completion of harvesting the field.

== Economy ==
Meratus Dayak are primarily farmers, and rice is the main crop. Rice cultivation occurs in swiddens (cleared portions of the forest). Swiddens are usually cultivated for a few years, then the forest is allowed to regenerate when the farmers move to a different swidden location to farm. The farmers may return to a swidden, although there is usually at least 15 years between leaving and returning to a swidden.

Meratus people also collect forest products and trade with Banjar at markets outside the mountains. In these transactions Banjar typically act as middle men between the Meratus and other traders.

== Social organization ==
Most Meratus live and farm in umbun which are also considered the primary social units among the Meratus Dayak. Umbun are founded by a man and a woman, usually a married couple, but sometimes also a brother and sister, a widow and her adult son, or other male-female pairs. Umbun also embrace a variety of dependents who have not yet founded their own umbun, including children and recently married, disabled, and widowed adults. The founding pair is responsible for the umbun. Some Meratus have also been moved into villages by government resettlement programs. The Meratus are classified as a "semi-nomadic" isolated tribe, and are the target of government development programs as such.
