= Banjarese language =

Native language of Banjarese people

Banjarese
- Banjar
- Basa Banjar, Jaku Banjar باس بنجر
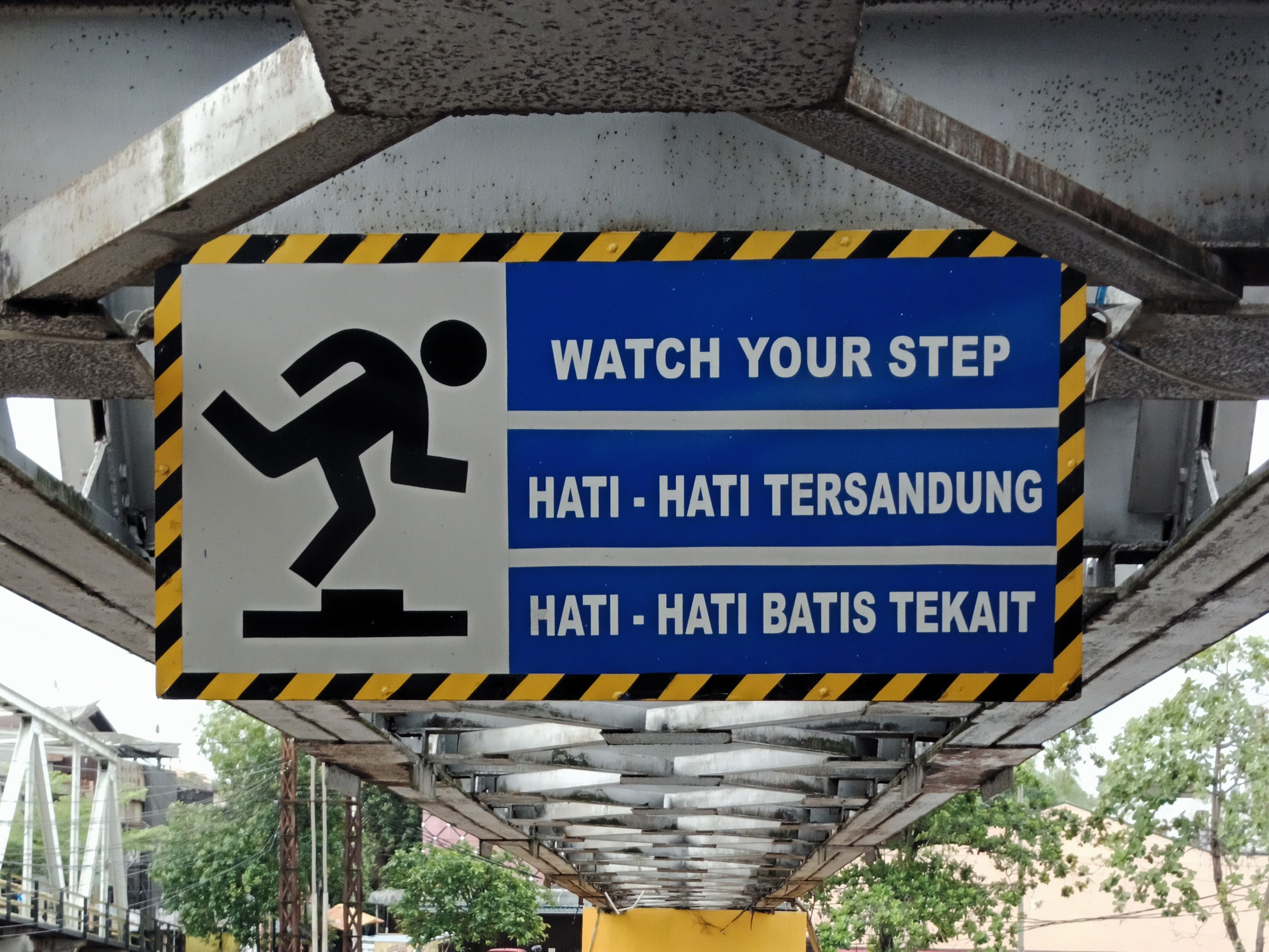
- A trilingual English–Indonesian–Banjar warning sign
- Pronunciation: [basa bandʒar], [dʒaku bandʒar]
- Native to: Indonesia
- Region: Kalimantan: South Kalimantan; Central Kalimantan; East Kalimantan; Sumatra: Riau; North Sumatra; Diaspora: Malaysia (notably in Perak, Selangor, Kedah and Johor), Singapore and Brunei Darussalam
- Ethnicity: Banjarese
- Native speakers: L1: 4,127,124 (2010 census); L1 & L2: ~10,650,000
- Language family: Austronesian: Malayo-Polynesian; Malayo-Sumbawan (?); Malayo-Chamic-BSS (?); Malayic; Banjarese
- Standard forms: Standard Banjarese
- Dialects: Banjar Hulu; Banjar Kuala; Banjar Pesisir
- Writing system: Latin (Banjarese alphabet) (predominantly); Jawi (sometimes)

Official status
- Recognised minority language in: Indonesia: South Kalimantan; Central Kalimantan; East Kalimantan
- Regulated by: Badan Pengembangan dan Pembinaan Bahasa (in Indonesia)

Language codes
- ISO 639-3: bjn
- Glottolog: banj1239
- Linguasphere: 31-MFA-fd
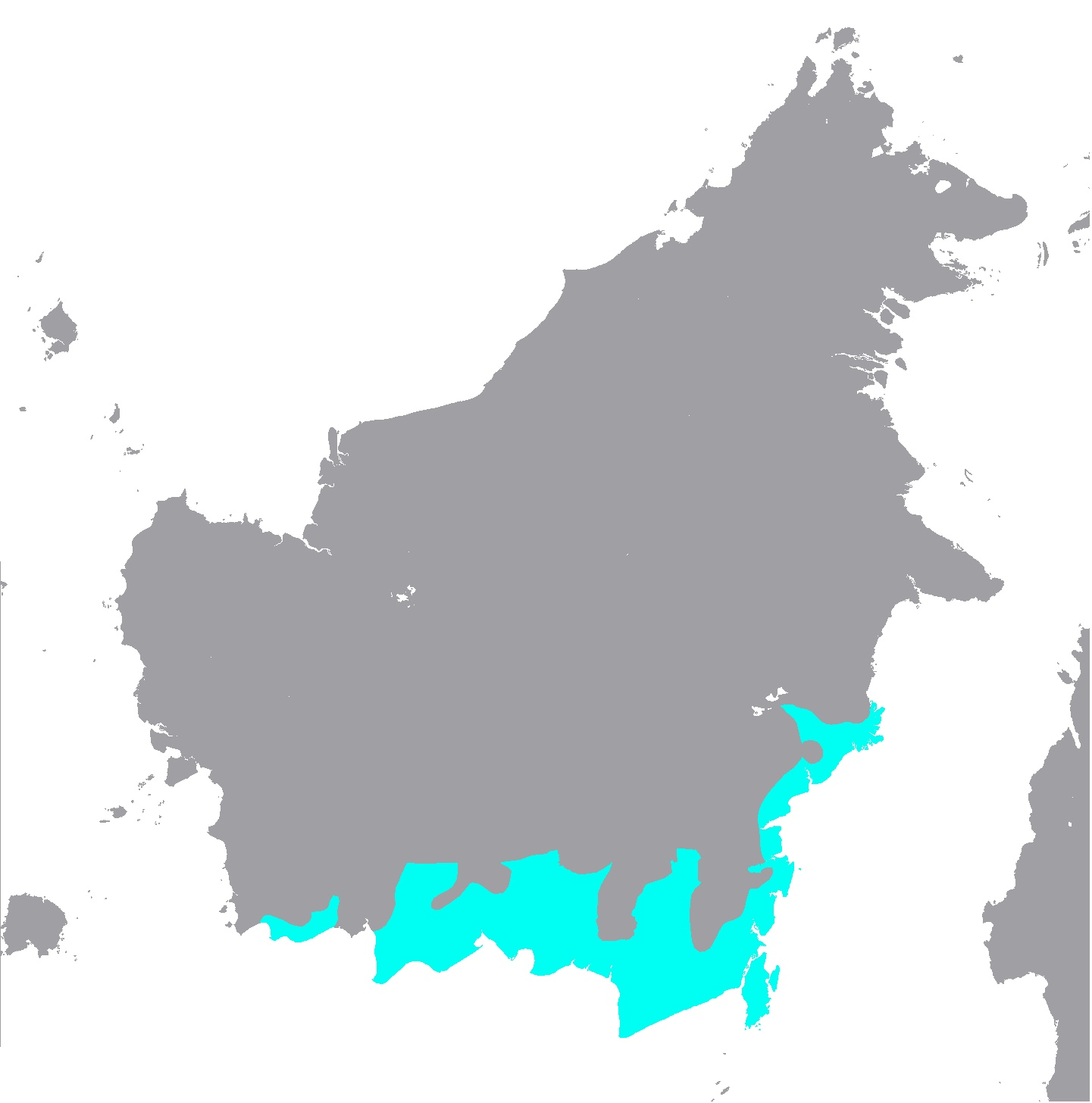

A Banjarese speaker

Banjarese (/ˈbændʒəˌriːz/ BAN-juh-reez; Basa Banjar, Jaku Banjar, Jawi script: باس بنجر, IPA: [basa bandʒar], [dʒaku bandʒar]) or simply Banjar, is an Austronesian language of the Malayic branch predominantly spoken by the Banjarese—an indigenous ethnic group native to Banjar regions—in the southeastern Kalimantan of Indonesia. The Banjarese language is the de facto lingua franca for various indigenous communities, especially in South Kalimantan, as well as Central Kalimantan (notably in Seruyan Regency and Sukamara Regency) and East Kalimantan in general.

Banjarese also has a significant population in other provinces of Indonesia, especially in Sumatra (Riau and North Sumatra), and some regencies of Riau have a Banjarese-majority population, such as Indragiri Hilir Regency.

Apart from the native Banjarese in Indonesia, the Banjarese language also spoken by a small Banjarese diaspora abroad, notably in the Malaysian states of Perak, Selangor, Kedah and Johor, with significant minorities in Sabah, Brunei Darussalam and Singapore; however, they tend to not use it as their primary language, and their degree of fluency is questionable.

== Dialects ==
There are at least two divisions of dialects within the Banjarese language:

1. Banjar Hulu
2. Banjar Kuala

According to Cense, the Banjar Hulu dialect are predominantly spoken by Banjarese people in the South Hulu Sungai Regency and North Hulu Sungai Regency regions. Berangas language, a Barito language that is almost extinct in South Kalimantan, also has a close relationship with Banjar Kuala dialect, where it absorbs much of the Banjarese language vocabulary, but lexically it is closer to other Barito languages, especially Bakumpai language.

== Phonology ==
=== Consonants ===
The consonantal inventory of Banjarese language is shown below. All but [ʔ] occur at the onset of a syllable:

		Bilabial	Alveolar	Palatal	Velar	Glottal
Nasal		m	n	ɲ	ŋ	
Plosive/ Affricate	voiceless	p	t	tʃ	k	(ʔ)
Plosive/ Affricate	voiced	b	d	dʒ	ɡ	
Fricative			s			h
Lateral			l			
Rhotic			r			
Approximant		w		j		

- [ʔ] is an allophone of /k/ at the end of a word.
- The following consonants can close a CVC syllable: /p t k m n ŋ s h r l/. Words cannot begin with consonant clusters. Within a root, an NC sequence will always be homorganic, though reduplication and a few prefixes such as sing- can produce other sequences, e.g. /ŋb, ŋp, ŋt, ŋr, ŋl, kr, /. Other medial sequences include /kt/, /kn/, /ŋn/, /nɲ/, /st/, /sn/, /hk/, /hj/, /lk/ and /rɡ/.

=== Vowels ===
Sudarmo finds five monophthongs:

	Front	Central	Back
Close	i		u
Mid	ɛ	(ə)	o
Open		a	

[ə] is an allophone of /ɛ/.

Durasid finds three monophthongs and three diphthongs in Pahuluan Banjarese:

	Front	Central	Back
Close	i		u
Open		a	

Regionally, /a/ has an allophone [ə] and /u/ has an allophone [ɔ]. The diphthongs are /ai/, /au/, /ui/. Loans with /e/ or /o/ are assimilated to these three vowels. E.g. kréték is realized as [karitik]. However, since most Banjarese speakers are effectively bilingual, this realization becomes rarer.

== Alphabet ==
The standard alphabet is as follows:

Alphabet
a	b	c	d	é	g	h	i	j	k	l	m	n	ny	ng	o	p	r	s	t	u	w	y
Phonetic value
a	b	tʃ	d	ɛ	ɡ	h	i	dʒ	k	l	m	n	ɲ	ŋ	o	p	r	s	t	u	w	j

== Sample text ==
Article 1 of the Universal Declaration of Human Rights in Banjarese:

Sabarataan urang ngitu diranakakan bibas lagi sama rata di dalam harga diri wan hak-haknya. Sabarataan dibarii akal wan hati nurani, maka handaknya bekelakuan gasan sesama jua di dalam jiwa kasaraban.

Article 1 of the Universal Declaration of Human Rights in English:

All human beings are born free and equal in dignity and rights. They are endowed with reason and conscience and should act towards one another in a spirit of brotherhood.

== See also ==
- Banjar people
- Banjarese architecture
- Banjarmasin
- South Kalimantan
- Paradisec

== Bibliography ==
- Bahasa Banjar Hulu [Pahuluan Banjar Language] (in Indonesian). Jakarta: Language Development Center of the Republic of Indonesia. 1978.
- Inventarisasi Kosakata Populer Bahasa Kutai dan Bahasa Banjar [Inventory of Popular Vocabulary of Kutai language and Banjarese language] (in Indonesian). Samarinda: East Kalimantan Provincial Linguistic Centre, Republic of Indonesia. 2007. ISBN 978-979-16282-5-9.
- Kamus Bahasa Banjar Dialek Hulu-Indonesia [Pahuluan Banjarese Dictionary to Indonesian] (in Indonesian). Banjarmasin: Banjarmasin Linguistic Center, Department of National Education of the Republic of Indonesia. 2008. ISBN 978-979-685-776-0.
- Morfo Sintaksis Bahasa Banjar Kuala [Syntactic Morphology of Kuala Banjarese] (in Indonesian). Jakarta: Language Development Center of the Republic of Indonesia. 1986.
- Nomina Bahasa Banjar [Nouns in Banjarese Language] (in Indonesian). Jakarta: Research and Development Agency and Bookkeeping of the Republic of Indonesia. 1998. ISBN 979-459-833-X.
- Pedoman Umum Ejaan Bahasa Banjar [General Guidelines for Banjarese Spelling] (in Indonesian) (1 ed.). Banjarmasin: Banjarmasin Linguistic Center, Language Center, Department of National Education of the Republic of Indonesia. 2009.
- Refleksi Etimon Proto-Austronesia dalam Bahasa Banjar [Reflections of Proto-Austronesian Etimons in Banjarese Language] (in Indonesian). Jakarta: Language Development Center of the Republic of Indonesia. 1992. ISBN 979459315X.
- Struktur Bahasa Banjar Kuala [Language Structure of Kuala Banjarese] (in Indonesian). Jakarta: Language Development Center of the Republic of Indonesia. 1981.
