= List of regencies and cities in Central Kalimantan =

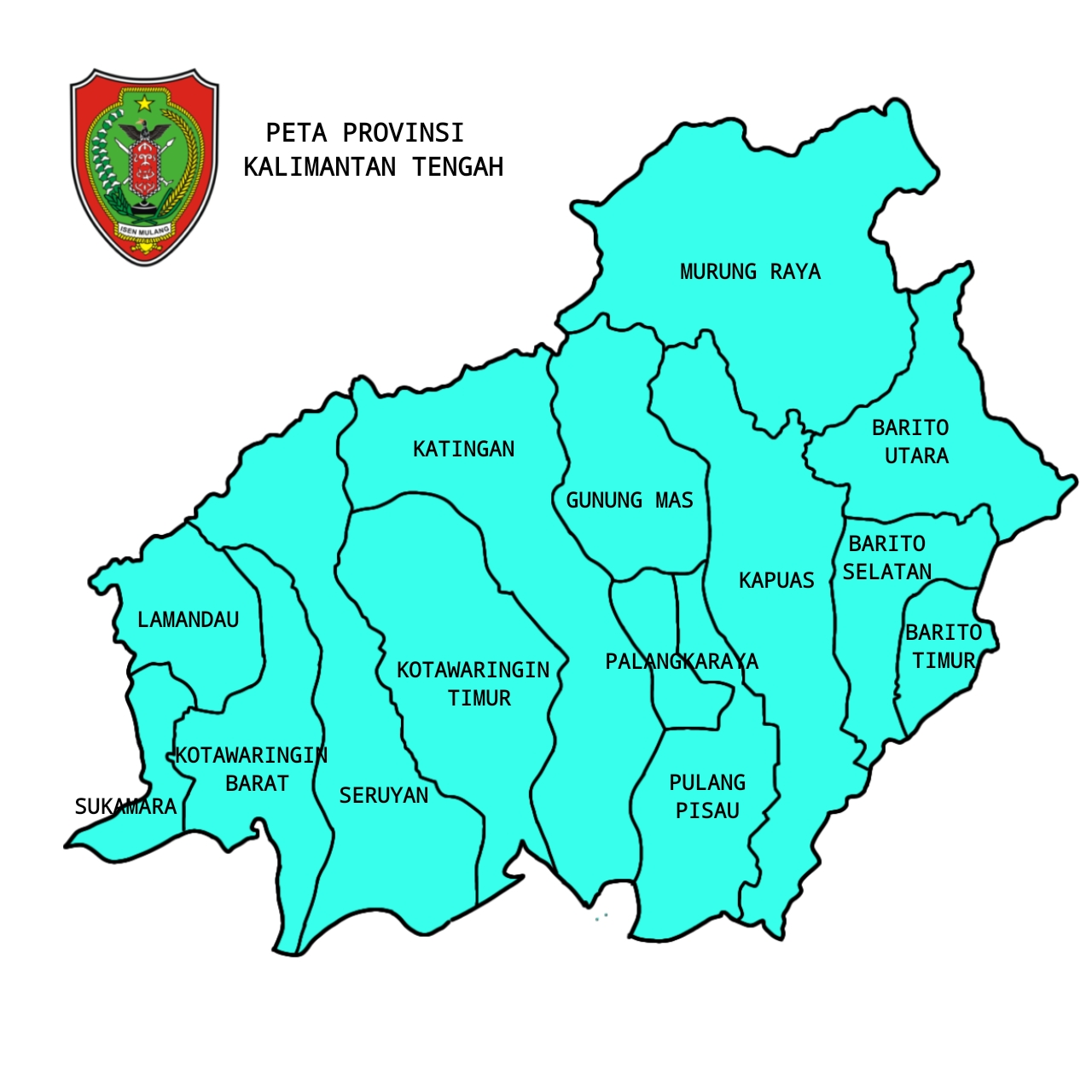
Administrative Divisions of Central Kalimantan Province, Indonesia

Here is the list of regencies and city in Central Kalimantan province. As of January 2021, there are 13 regencies and 1 city.

No.	Code	Regency/City	Capital	Area (km^{2} & sq mi)	Population (2020)	Districts	Subdistricts/Villages	HDI 2022	Logo	Location map
1	62.13	East Barito Regency	Tamiang Layang	3,834 km^{2} (1,480 sq mi)	113,229	10	3/101	0.721 (High)		
2	62.02	East Kotawaringin Regency	Sampit	16,796 km^{2} (6,485 sq mi)	428,895	17	17/168	0.717 (High)		
3	62.10	Gunung Mas Regency	Kuala Kurun	10,805 km^{2} (4,172 sq mi)	135,373	12	12/115	0.714 (High)		
4	62.03	Kapuas Regency	Kuala Kapuas	14,999 km^{2} (5,791 sq mi)	410,446	17	17/214	0.700 (High)		
5	62.06	Katingan Regency	Kasongan	17,500 km^{2} (6,800 sq mi)	162,222	13	7/154	0.697 (Medium)		
6	62.09	Lamandau Regency	Nanga Bulik	6,414 km^{2} (2,476 sq mi)	97,611	8	3/85	0.711 (High)		
7	62.12	Murung Raya Regency	Puruk Cahu	23,700 km^{2} (9,200 sq mi)	111,527	10	9/116	0.686 (Medium)		
8	62.05	North Barito Regency	Muara Teweh	8,300 km^{2} (3,200 sq mi)	154,812	9	10/93	0.712 (High)		
9	62.11	Pulang Pisau Regency	Pulang Pisau	8,997 km^{2} (3,474 sq mi)	134,499	8	4/95	0.690 (Medium)		
10	62.71	Palangka Raya City	-	2,399.50 km^{2} (926.45 sq mi)	293,457	5	30/-	0.812 (Very High)		
11	62.07	Seruyan Regency	Kuala Pembuang	16,404 km^{2} (6,334 sq mi)	162,906	10	3/97	0.682 (Medium)		
12	62.04	South Barito Regency	Buntok Kota	8,830 km^{2} (3,410 sq mi)	131,140	6	7/86	0.710 (High)		
13	62.08	Sukamara Regency	Sukamara	3,827 km^{2} (1,478 sq mi)	63,464	5	3/29	0.689 (Medium)		
14	62.01	West Kotawaringin Regency	Pangkalan Bun	10,759 km^{2} (4,154 sq mi)	270,388	6	13/81	0.734 (High)		
