= Barito =

Barito may refer to:

- Barito River, a big drainage basin in South Kalimantan, Indonesia
- Barito languages, around twenty Dayak (Austronesian) languages of Borneo, Southern Philippines. Also Malagasy, the national language of Madagascar.
  - East Barito languages, group of a dozen Dayak (Austronesian) languages of Borneo
  - West Barito languages, group of half a dozen Dayak (Austronesian) languages of Borneo

== See also ==
- Barito Kuala Regency, one of the regencies (kabupaten) in the Indonesian province of South Kalimantan including North Barito Regency and South Barito Regency
- PS Barito Putera, Indonesian football club
