= Dusun =

Dusun may refer to:

- Dusun language, language of Dusun people of Borneo
- Dusun people, an indigenous ethnic group in Sabah, Malaysia
- Dusun people (Brunei), an indigenous ethnic group of Brunei
- Dusun Balangan language, an Austronesian language spoken in Kalimantan, Indonesia
- Dusun Malang language, an Austronesian language spoken in Kalimantan, Indonesia
- Dusun Witu language, an Austronesian language spoken in Kalimantan, Indonesia
- Dusun Tua, a village in Hulu Langat district, Selangor, Malaysia.
- Dusun Tua (state constituency), a state constituency in Selangor, Malaysia

== See also ==
- Dusunic languages, language group of Borneo
