= Mendawai language =

Austronesian language spoken in Kalimantan, Indonesia

Mendawai
- Native to: Indonesia
- Region: Kalimantan
- Ethnicity: Mendawai
- Native speakers: (undated figure of 20,000)
- Language family: Austronesian: Malayo-Polynesian; West Barito; South; Mendawai

Language codes
- ISO 639-3: –

Mendawai is an Austronesian language spoken along the lower course of the Arut River in West Kotawaringin Regency, Central Kalimantan, Indonesia. It is at the mutually unintelligible end of a dialect continuum with Ngaju. Mendawai and Ngaju share c. 70% of their basic vocabulary.

== Vocabulary ==
Mendawai	Bahasa Indonesia	English
Yaku/Kula	Aku/Saya	I
Ikau/Dika	Kamu/Anda	You
Emen	Kenapa	Why
Isen	Mana	Where
Periya	Kapan	When
Ela	Jangan	Don't
Hatue	Laki-laki	Man
Bawi	Perempuan	Woman
Iya	Dia	He/She
Nggeh/Iyuh	Iya	Yes
Umbuy/Bare	Tidak	No
Aweh	Siapa	Who
Een	Apa	What
Kueh	Bagaimana	How
Ikey	Kami	We
Itah	Kita	We
