= Salundik Gohong =

Indonesian military officer and politician (1946–2023)

Mayor of Palangka Raya
- In office 22 September 1998 – 22 September 2003
- Governor: Warsito Rasman; Asmawi Agani
- Preceded by: Nahson Taway
- Succeeded by: Tuah Pahoe

Personal details
- Born: 8 August 1946 Bawan, Banama Tingang, Pulang Pisau, Central Kalimantan, Indonesia
- Died: 23 February 2023 (aged 76) Palangka Raya, Central Kalimantan, Indonesia
- Spouse: Cahaya Asi Ngantung (m. 1973)
- Children: 4
- Parents: Hermen Gohong (father); Fransinae (mother)
- Education: Indonesian Armed Forces Academy, Army Section

Military service
- Branch/service: Indonesian Army
- Years of service: 1971–1999
- Rank: Colonel
- Unit: Infantry

Salundik Gohong (8 August 1946 – 23 February 2023) was an Indonesian military officer and politician who served as the mayor of Palangka Raya from 1998 until 2003 and as an MP in the Central Kalimantan Regional People's Representative Council from 2004 until 2007.

== Early life ==
Gohong was born on 8 August 1946 in Bawan, a small village in the Pulang Pisau Regency, as the son of Hermen Gohong and Fransinae. He began his education at a people's school (equivalent to primary school) in the nearby regency of Kapuas. He finished people's school in 1958 and continued studying at a junior high school in Kuala Kurun, Gunung Mas Regency, which he completed in 1962. From there, Salundik moved to Palangka Raya, the capital of Central Kalimantan, and finished his high school there in 1966.

Upon obtaining his high school diploma, Gohong applied for the Indonesian Military Academy (at that time the Indonesian Armed Forces Academy, Land Section) in Magelang. He was accepted and undertook military education in the academy for four years. He graduated from the academy on 8 December 1971 and was installed as second lieutenant from the infantry corps.

== Military career ==
After becoming a second lieutenant, Gohong attended a brief course on infantry tactics before being assigned as a platoon commander in Palangkaraya in 1972. He was then sent to study intelligence in Bogor for four months in 1973 before receiving a promotion as company commander the next year.

In 1975, Gohong was reassigned to Buntok and became the chief intelligence officer of the local military district. He held this position for four years before attending a course for intelligence unit commanders in Bogor. After finishing this course, he was transferred to Banjarmasin, the capital of South Kalimantan, as commander of the intelligence unit in the city.

Salundik left the position of intelligence unit commander in 1982 and was appointed the head of the intelligence service in the Airborne Combat Command. He retained this position after the command was reorganized as the Kostrad 1st Infantry Division. During his tenure in the infantry division, Gohong was sent to East Timor, where he led several intelligence operations in the province. He also completed a military advanced course in 1982 and a course on nuclear biological chemistry, in 1983.

Gohong ended his service in the infantry division in 1988 and became the intelligence chief of the Sunan Gunung Jati Military Area in Cirebon. He was transferred to the Siliwangi (West Java) Military Regional Command in 1992 and became an assistant officer in the intelligence staff for about a year before being entrusted to command the intelligence detachment of the military regional command. He returned to Kalimantan and was assigned to the Regional Agency for the Strengthening of National Stability (Bakorstanasda, Badan Koordinasi Stabilitas Nasional Daerah), an agency set up by the military to monitor regional political activities. He ended his military service after being appointed mayor. Less than a year later, the government enacted a new rule which barred active military officers from holding political positions, and Gohong retired early from the military in 1999.

== Political career ==
Gohong was elected as mayor of Palangka Raya in an internal election held by the city council in early September 1998. He was installed on 22 September 1998, replacing Nahson Taway. During his tenure, ethnic riots occurred in the city as a spillover from the Sampit conflict between the Dayak and the Madurese people. Refugees from the Sampit conflict evacuated to Palangka Raya, causing shops, schools, and government offices to close early. A day after the refugees began pouring into Palangka Raya, Gohong invited influential figures and customary leaders in Palangka Raya into a meeting. Gohong explained the background of the conflict and discussed methods to prevent further riots occurring in Palangka Raya. However, these discussions failed to prevent further riots, and several people died after a group of Dayak reportedly tried to "clean" the city from Madurese people. To this day, any Madurese people who live in the city hid their ethnic identity, as they would be told to leave the city.

Gohong was replaced from his position as mayor on 22 September 2003. He was elected as a member of the Central Kalimantan Regional People's Representative Council in the 2004 Indonesian legislative election. However, his term was cut short in 2007, as in that year Gohong was found guilty in a corruption case. Gohong was sentenced to one year in prison for inflating the land price of a Hindu religious school in Palangka Raya. He was freed from prison and decided to run in the 2009 Palangka Raya mayoral election, but obtained only 15% of the votes and lost to academician Riban Satia.

== Personal life ==
Gohong was married to Cahaya Asi Ngantung on 17 May 1973. The couple had two daughters and two sons.

Gohong died of a heart attack on the morning of 23 February 2023 at his house in Palangka Raya. Gohong was 76, and had suffered heart disease in the three years prior to his death. A requiem mass was held at his house on the day of his death. His body was interred at the Tjilik Riwut Public Cemetery in a military ceremony on 26 February 2023.

== Dates of rank ==
| Second lieutenant | 8 December 1971 |
| First lieutenant | 1 April 1974 |
| Captain | 1 April 1978 |
| Major | 1 April 1983 |
| Lieutenant colonel | 1 April 1989 |
| Colonel | 1 April 1998 |
| Retired | 31 July 1999 |

== Awards ==
- Military Long Service Medals, 4th Category (Satyalancana Kesetiaan 8 Tahun) (1981)
- Military Long Service Medals, 3rd Category (Satyalancana Kesetiaan 16 Tahun) (1990)
- Military Long Service Medals, 2nd Category (Satyalancana Kesetiaan 24 Tahun) (1996)
- Timor Military Campaign Medal (Satyalancana Seroja) (1985/1986?)
- Star of Kartika Eka Paksi, 3rd Class (Bintang Kartika Eka Paksi Nararya) (1997)
