= Barito languages =

Language subgroup of Southeast Asia and Madagascar

Barito
- Greater Barito
- Geographic distribution: Indonesia (Borneo), Madagascar, Southern Philippines
- Linguistic classification: Austronesian: Malayo-Polynesian; Basap-Greater Barito; Greater Barito; Barito
- Proto-language: Proto-Barito
- Subdivisions: East Barito; West Barito; Mahakam; Sama–Bajaw

Language codes
- Glottolog: grea1283

The Barito languages are around twenty Austronesian languages of Indonesia (Borneo), plus Malagasy, the national language of Madagascar, and the Sama–Bajaw languages around the Sulu Archipelago. They are named after the Barito River located in South Kalimantan, Indonesia.

The Barito subgroup was first proposed by Hudson (1967), comprising the three branches East Barito, West Barito, and Mahakam (Barito–Mahakam). It is thought by some to be a Sprachbund rather than a genuine clade. For example, Adelaar (2005) rejects Barito as a valid group despite accepting less traditional groups such as North Bornean and Malayo-Sumbawan.

The Malagasy language originates from the South East Borneo area (modern-day Indonesia), and it has been linked to Ma'anyan within the Southeast Barito group, with Malagasy incorporating numerous Indonesian-Malay and Javanese loanwords. It is known that Ma'anyan people were brought as labourers and slaves by Malay and Javanese people in their trading fleets, which reached Madagascar by ca. 50–500 AD. Based on linguistic evidence, it has been suggested that Malagasy was taken to East Africa between the 7th and 13th centuries. It is likely that a separate Malagasy speech community had already formed in Borneo before the early Malagasy migrants settled in Madagascar.

== Greater Barito ==
Blust (2006) proposes that the Sama-Bajaw languages also derive from the Barito lexical region, though not from any established group, and Ethnologue has followed, calling the resulting group 'Greater Barito'.

Smith (2017, 2018) proposes a Greater Barito linkage with the following branches, and considers Basap to be a sister of the Greater Barito linkage, forming a Basap–Greater Barito group.

- Basap–Greater Barito
  - Basap
  - Greater Barito
    - Northwest Barito (Kadorih, Siang, Murung)
    - Southwest Barito (Ngaju, Kapuas, Bakumpai)
    - Sama–Bajaw (Yakan, etc.)
    - Southeast Barito (Ma'anyan, Dusun Witu, Dusun Balangan, Malagasy)
    - Central-East Barito (Dusun Malang, Dusun Bayang, Paku, Semihim)
    - Northeast Barito (Taboyan, Lawangan, Bentian, Paser, Benuaq)
    - Tunjung

The earlier groupings East Barito (comprising Smith's Southeast Barito, Central-East Barito and Northeast Barito) and West Barito (comprising Southwest Barito and Northwest Barito) are rejected by Smith.

== West Kalimantan groups ==
Some Barito-speaking Dayak ethnic subgroups and their respective languages in West Kalimantan province, Indonesia:

Group	Subgroup	Language	Regency
Oruung Da'an		Oruung Da'an	Kapuas Hulu
Pangin		Pangin	Melawi
Uud Danum	Cihie	Cihie	Sintang
Uud Danum	Dohoi	Dohoi	Sintang

== Phonological shifts ==
According to Hudson (1967), all West Barito languages are attested to shift *R > *h, but this change is also found in Tunjung. Furthermore, the sound change *-b > *-p, deletion of the intervocalic glottal stop and closing of final vowels with glottal stop are also found in West Barito languages, among several other Barito subgroups. Because of this, no sound changes of even medium quality which define this subgroup exist. West Barito is therefore not unambiguously considered a subgroup according to Smith.

Understanding the East Barito languages, two sound changes define this subgroup, *z > *d and *-R > *-y. In the Barito languages of East Kalimantan, intervocalic *R has also become y. However, in Maanyan and Dusun, there is a split where *-R- became either *-h- or *-y- in reflexes. Therefore, Smith argues that the sound changes listed do not provide particularly strong evidence for subgrouping.

== See also ==
- Languages of Indonesia
- Overseas Indonesians
- Native Indonesians
