= Ma'anyan =

Ma'anyan may refer to:

- Ma'anyan language
- Ma'anyan people
