= Punan language =

Punan language can refer to several Austronesian languages of Borneo:

- Punan languages, closely related languages spoken by the Punan people
- Penan-Nibong language, a language complex spoken by the Penan people
- Punan Kelai language, part of the Segai–Modang subgroup of Kayanic
- Melanau–Kajang languages, also referred to as Müller-Schwaner 'Punan'
- Siang language, a Barito language spoken in upstream Barito River, whose speakers are sometimes referred to as 'Punan' by people downstream
