= KKX =

KKX or kkx may refer to:

- Kikai Airport (IATA code), Kagoshima Prefecture, Japan
- Kohin language (ISO 639-3 code), Kalimantan, Indonesia
