= Witu language =

Witu may be:

- Vitu language (New Guinea)
- Dusun Witu language (Borneo)
- Wiru language (New Guinea)
