= Paku language (Indonesia) =

Austronesian language spoken in Kalimantan, Indonesia

Paku
- Native to: Indonesia
- Region: Kalimantan
- Native speakers: 15–50 (2018/2020)
- Language family: Austronesian: Malayo-Polynesian; East Barito; South; Paku

Language codes
- ISO 639-3: pku
- Glottolog: paku1239

Paku (Bakau) is an Austronesian language spoken in four villages in the East Barito Regency of Central Kalimantan province, Indonesia. It is closely related to the Malagasy language spoken on Madagascar. Most of the remaining speakers are also fluent in other languages. The use of the language is decreasing and speakers are increasingly shifting to Ma'anyan, a lingua franca of East Barito. In 2018, it was estimated there was about 50 speakers of the language in the villages of Tampa, Tarinsing, Bantei Napu, and Kalamus in the regency of East Barito.

== Phonology ==
=== Vowels ===
Paku vowels
	Front	Central	Back
Close	i		u
Close-mid	e		o
Low		a	

- [ə] occurs as a free variant of /e/ in unstressed syllables, e.g., /meˈlintaŋ/ 'yellow' is pronounced [məˈlɪntaŋ].

=== Consonants ===
Paku consonants
		Bilabial	Alveolar	Post-alveolar	Palatal	Velar	Glottal
Plosive	voiceless	p	t			k	ʔ
Plosive	voiced	b	d			g	
Affricate				d͡ʒ			
Nasal		m	n		ɲ	ŋ	
Trill			r				
Fricative			s				
Approximant		w	l		j		
