= Basap language =

Austronesian language spoken in Kalimantan, Indonesia

Basap
- Native to: Indonesia
- Region: Borneo
- Ethnicity: Punan (Basap people)
- Native speakers: 15,000 (2007)
- Language family: Austronesian: Malayo-Polynesian; Basap–Barito; Basap

Language codes
- ISO 639-3: bdb
- Glottolog: basa1286

Basap is an Austronesian language spoken in Borneo, Indonesia.

Within Kalimantan Timur and Kalimantan Utara provinces, Basap speakers are scattered across Berau, Bulungan, Kutai Kartanegara, Penajam Paser Utara, and Kutai Timur regencies. Dialects are Jembayan, Bulungan, Berau, Dumaring, Binatang, and Karangan (Ethnologue).

Smith (2018) considers Basap to have formed part of an ancient linkage of early forms of Barito languages in eastern Kalimantan.

== Phonology ==
Consonants
	Labial	Alveolar	Palatal	Velar	Glottal
Plosive	p b	t d	tʃ dʒ	k g	ʔ
Fricative		s			h
Nasal	m	n	ɲ	ŋ	
Approximant	w	l	j		

Vowels
	Front	Central	Back
High	i		u
Mid	e	ə	o
Low		a	
