= Kohin language =

Austronesian language spoken in Kalimantan, Indonesia

Kohin
- Seruyan
- Native to: Indonesia
- Region: Kalimantan
- Native speakers: 8,000 (2003)
- Language family: Austronesian: Malayo-Polynesian; West Barito; North; Kohin

Language codes
- ISO 639-3: kkx
- Glottolog: kohi1250

Kohin, also known as (Bahasa) Seruyan, is a Barito language of central Kalimantan, Indonesia.
