= Dusun Balangan language =

Austronesian language spoken in Kalimantan, Indonesia

Dusun Balangan
- Halong
- Native to: Indonesia
- Region: South Kalimantan and East Kalimantan
- Native speakers: 5,000 (2014)
- Language family: Austronesian: Malayo-Polynesian; Western Malayo-Polynesian; Philippine languages; Greater Barito; East Barito; Maʼanyan; Dusun Balangan

Language codes
- ISO 639-3: –
- Glottolog: dusu1270
- Dusun Balangan language is classified as Critically Endangered by the UNESCO Atlas of the World's Languages in Danger

Dusun Balangan (Halong) is a language spoken by the Halong Dayak people in the Balangan Regency, South Kalimantan and Tanjung Pinang village in Paser Regency, East Kalimantan, Indonesia.

== See also ==
- Ma’anyan language
