= Tamiang Layang =

Tamiang Layang Tamiang Layang
- Regency seat
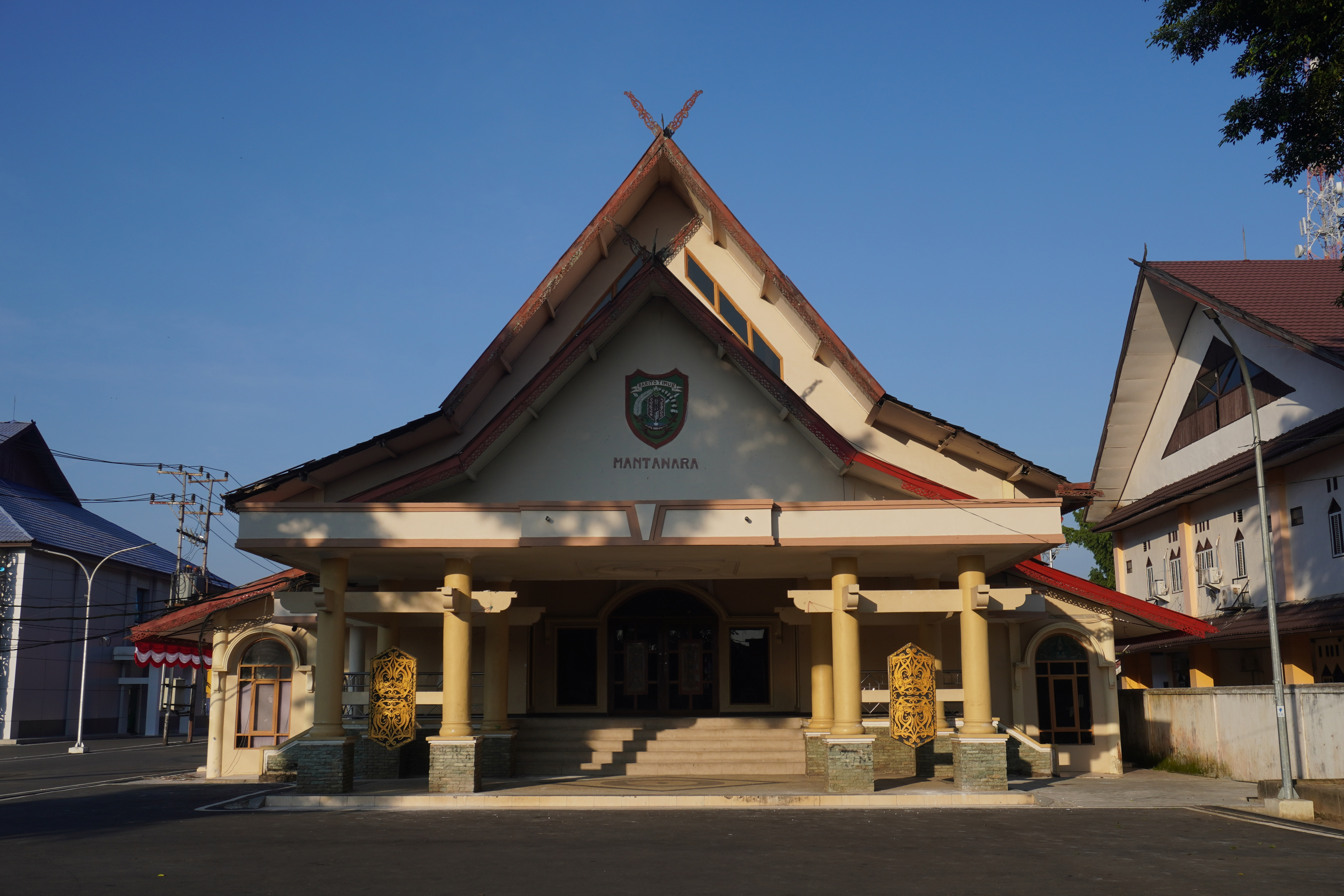
- Mantawara Hall in Tamiang Layang
- Motto: "Gumi Jari Janang Kalalawah"; Maanyan language: "Be Victorious Forever"
- Location in Central Kalimantan, Indonesia Tamiang Layang (Indonesia)
- Coordinates: 2°06′58″S 115°10′09″E
- Country: Indonesia
- Province: Central Kalimantan
- Regency: East Barito Regency
- District: Dusun Timur

Area
  - Total: 45.56 km^{2} (17.59 sq mi)
- Elevation: 11 m (36 ft)

Population (2024)
  - Total: 10,947
  - Density: 236.6/km^{2} (613/sq mi)
- Time zone: UTC+7 (Western Indonesian Time)
- Postal code: 73617
- Area code: +62526

Tamiang Layang (abbreviated: TML), a town (kelurahan) in the district of East Dusun (kecamatan Dusun Timur), is the regency seat of East Barito Regency and also one of the towns in Central Kalimantan. This town is at a distance of 287 km east of Palangka Raya city, the capital of Central Kalimantan Province. The population of this town was 10,947 people as of 2024.

== Geography ==
Tamiang Layang, Central Kalimantan

Climate chart (precipitation, max. and min. temperature)
J	F	M	A	M	J	J	A	S	O	N	D
302 31 23	251 31 23	309 31 23	261 31 23	202 31 24	148 31 23	114 31 23	87 31 23	100 32 24	181 32 23	305 31 23	332 30 23
- █ Average max. and min. temperatures in °C
- █ Precipitation totals in mm
- Source: Climate-Data.org & BMKG
Imperial conversion
J	F	M	A	M	J	J	A	S	O	N	D
12 87 73	9.9 87 74	12 87 74	10 87 74	8 88 74	5.8 87 74	4.5 88 73	3.4 88 74	3.9 90 74	7.1 89 74	12 88 74	13 87 73
- █ Average max. and min. temperatures in °F
- █ Precipitation totals in inches

Tamiang Layang is located at the eastern part of Central Kalimantan. To be precise, this town is located at 2.1160 S and 115.1691 E. Tamiang layang is also the most eastern town in Central Kalimantan and this makes it 81 km closer to the city of Banjarbaru, the capital of South Kalimantan than to Palangka Raya City, the capital of its province, Central Kalimantan. The total area of this town is about 45.56 km^{2} which makes it roughly 1.2% of the total area of East Barito Regency.

Tamiang Layang is traversed by Sirau River, one of the major rivers crossing the East Barito Regency. This town is situated on the flat land of eastern Central Kalimantan with the elevation only reaching 11 metres above sea level. The climate of this town is tropical rainforest (Af) with huge amounts of precipitation almost all year long, constant high humidity, and temperature always above 20 °C.

== Demographics ==
The population of Tamiang Layang as of 2024 was about 10,947 inhabitants which represented 37% of the population of Dusun Timur district and 9.1% of the entire population of East Barito Regency. The population density of this town was roughly 240.3/km^{2}. In Tamiang Layang as at 2021, there were roughly 2,601 households and the average household size of the town was about 4.1 people. The sex ratio of this town was 102 which means there were 102 males to every 100 females.

== Education ==
As of 2021, there are currently six primary schools (five public schools & one Catholic private school), four middle schools (all public schools), one public high school, two public vocational schools, and one Christian theological college.

== Public facilities ==
For health facility, Tamiang Layang has one general hospital, nine pharmacies, and one public health centre. For economic facilities, this town currently has six shopping complexes, one big market, two minimarkets, 31 grocery stores, 241 restaurants, 289 food stalls, six hotels, and two inns. Also, the town has more than 20 religious facilities. There are twelve Islamic religious facilities, eleven Protestant churches, and one Catholic church.
