= East Barito Regency =

Regency in Central Kalimantan, Indonesia

East Barito Regency Kabupaten Barito Timur
- Regency
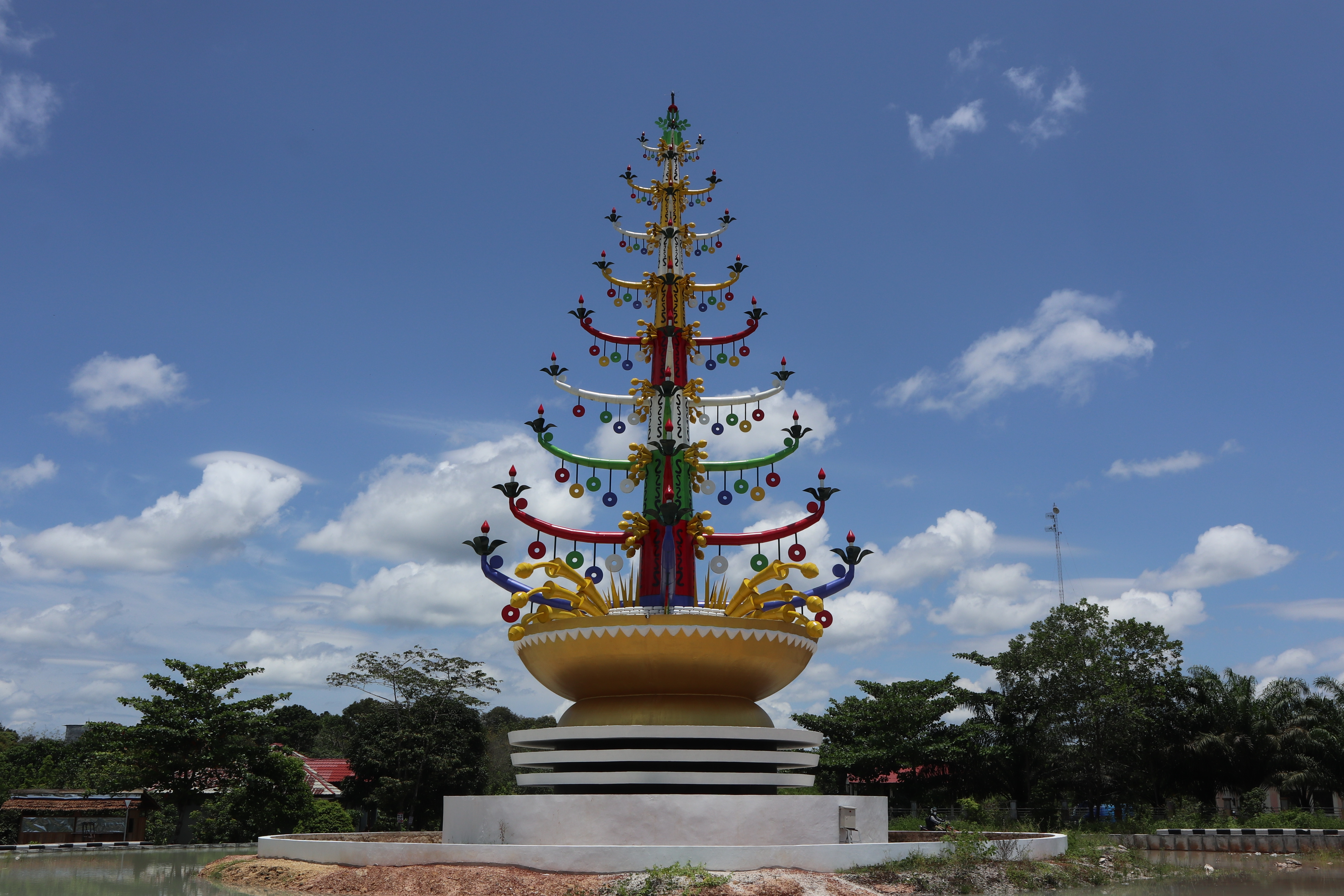
- Gunung Perak monument in Tamiang Layang

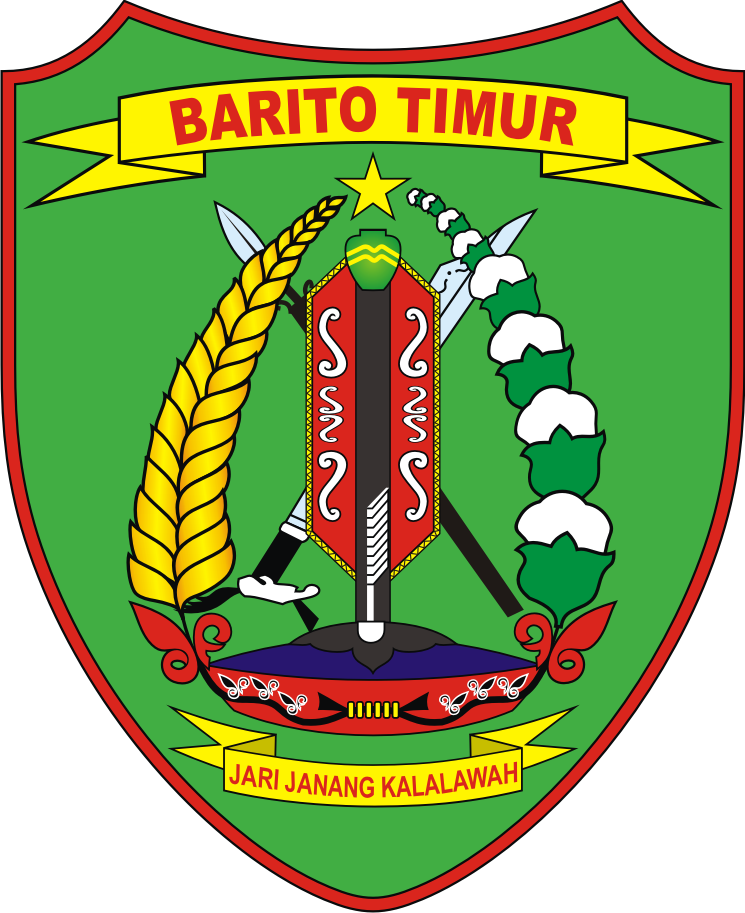
- Coat of arms
- Motto(s): "Gumi Jari Janang Kalalawah"; Maanyan language: "Be Victorious Forever"
- Location within Central Kalimantan

- Location in Kalimantan and Indonesia East Barito Regency (Indonesia)
- Coordinates: 1.9333°S 115.1000°E
- Country: Indonesia
- Region: Kalimantan
- Province: Central Kalimantan
- Capital: Tamiang Layang

Government
  - Regent: Muhammad Yamin
  - Vice Regent: Adi Mula Nakalelu

Area
  - Total: 3,213.00 km^{2} (1,240.55 sq mi)

Population (mid 2025 estimate)
  - Total: 120,200
  - Density: 37.41/km^{2} (96.89/sq mi)
- Time zone: UTC+7 (Western Indonesia Time)
- Area code: (+62) 526
- Website: baritotimurkab.go.id

East Barito Regency (Indonesian: Kabupaten Barito Timur) is one of the thirteen regencies which comprise the Central Kalimantan Province on the island of Kalimantan (Borneo), Indonesia. It was formed on 10 April 2002 from districts which were formerly part of South Barito Regency. The town of Tamiang Layang, with a population of 10,947 in 2024, is the capital of East Barito Regency. The population of the Regency was 97,372 at the 2010 Census and 113,229 at the 2020 Census; the official estimate as at mid 2025 was 120,200 (comprising 61,390 males and 58,820 females).

== Administrative districts ==
East Barito Regency consists of ten districts (kecamatan), tabulated below with their areas and their population totals from the 2010 Census and the 2020 Census, together with the official estimates as at mid 2025. The table also includes the locations of the district administrative centres, the number of administrative villages in each district (a total of 100 rural desa and 3 urban kelurahan), and its postal codes.

Kode Wilayah	Name of District (kecamatan)	Area in km^{2}	Pop'n Census 2010	Pop'n Census 2020	Pop'n Estimate mid 2025	Admin centre	No. of villages	Post code
62.13.02	Benua Lima	187.40	6,071	6,336	6,570	Taniran	7 ^{(a)}	73661
62.13.01	Dusun Timur (East Dusun)	358.52	21,323	28,144	31,600	Tamiang Layang	17 ^{(a)}	73612 - 73618^{(b)}
62.13.07	Paju Epat	721.47	3,990	6,270	7,170	Telang	9	73617
62.13.04	Awang	175.64	5,587	6,101	6,250	Hayaping	11	73681
62.13.03	Patangkep Tutui	275.75	7,225	7,001	7,080	Bentot	10	73671
62.13.05	Dusun Tengah (Central Dusun)	412.26	22,578	24,458	24,960	Ampah Kota	8 ^{(a)}	73652
62.13.08	Raren Batuah	182.52	7,603	8,327	8,540	Unsum	9	73655
62.13.09	Paku	204.55	7,554	8,686	9,120	Tampa	12	73654
62.13.10	Karusen Janang	173.85	4,194	5,312	5,850	Dayu	7	73650
62.13.06	Pematang Karau	521.04	11,247	12,594	13,060	Bambulung	13	73653
	Totals	3,213.00	97,372	113,229	120,200	Tamiang Layang	103	

Note: (a) including one kelurahan - the district admin centre. (b) the village of Magantis has a postcode of 73612, Matabu of 73613, Dorong of 73614, Harang of 73615, while seven villages share 73617 and six villages share 73618.

== Climate ==
Tamiang Layang has a tropical rainforest climate (Af) with heavy rainfall from October to June and moderate rainfall from July to September.

Climate data for Tamiang Layang
Month	Jan	Feb	Mar	Apr	May	Jun	Jul	Aug	Sep	Oct	Nov	Dec	Year
Mean daily maximum °C (°F)	29.5 (85.1)	30.1 (86.2)	30.3 (86.5)	30.7 (87.3)	30.8 (87.4)	30.4 (86.7)	30.4 (86.7)	31.0 (87.8)	31.3 (88.3)	31.3 (88.3)	30.6 (87.1)	30.1 (86.2)	30.5 (87.0)
Daily mean °C (°F)	26.0 (78.8)	26.4 (79.5)	26.5 (79.7)	26.9 (80.4)	27.0 (80.6)	26.5 (79.7)	26.3 (79.3)	26.7 (80.1)	26.9 (80.4)	27.0 (80.6)	26.7 (80.1)	26.5 (79.7)	26.6 (79.9)
Mean daily minimum °C (°F)	22.6 (72.7)	22.7 (72.9)	22.8 (73.0)	23.1 (73.6)	23.2 (73.8)	22.6 (72.7)	22.2 (72.0)	22.4 (72.3)	22.6 (72.7)	22.7 (72.9)	22.8 (73.0)	22.9 (73.2)	22.7 (72.9)
Average rainfall mm (inches)	286 (11.3)	262 (10.3)	274 (10.8)	246 (9.7)	208 (8.2)	147 (5.8)	118 (4.6)	98 (3.9)	123 (4.8)	145 (5.7)	241 (9.5)	301 (11.9)	2,449 (96.5)
Source: Climate-Data.org

== Demographics ==
Religion in East Barito Regency (2022)
1. Islam (51.0%)
2. Protestant (36.4%)
3. Roman Catholic (8.66%)
4. Kaharingan/Hinduism (3.97%)
5. Buddhism, Confucianism, and others (0.01%)

As of 2022, the total population of East Barito regency is 115,406 people. The population density of East Barito is roughly 30.10 people/km^{2}. The sex ratio in this regency is 105 which can be translated as there are 105 male population for a 100 female one. East Barito is one of the most diverse regencies of Central Kalimantan in terms of religious adherence. This regency is not overwhelmingly Muslim majority and it has the second highest percentage of Christian population in Central Kalimantan after Gunung Mas Regency.
