= South Barito Regency =

Regency in Central Kalimantan, Indonesia

South Barito Regency Kabupaten Barito Selatan
- Regency
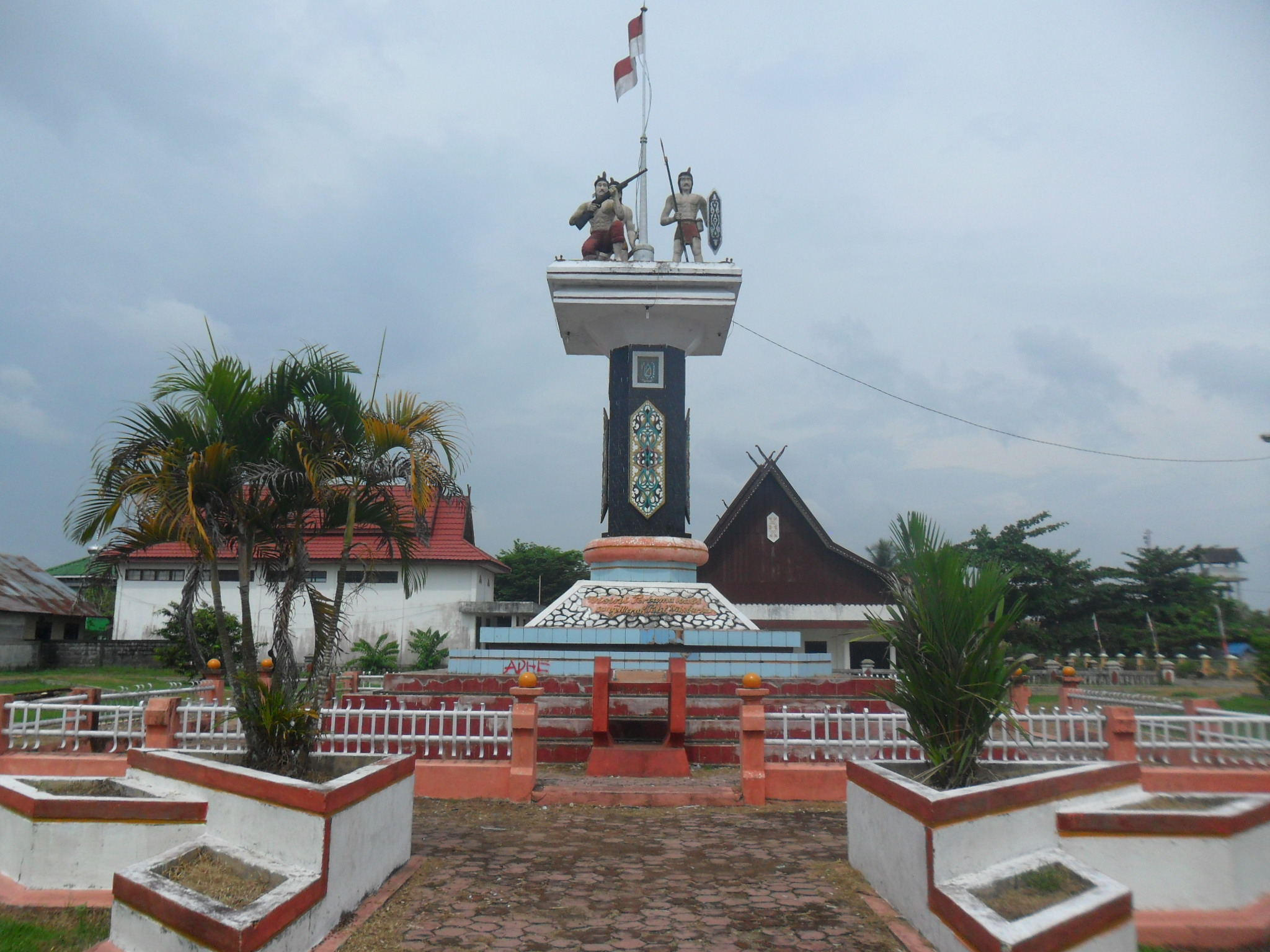
- A monument in Buntok, South Barito Regency

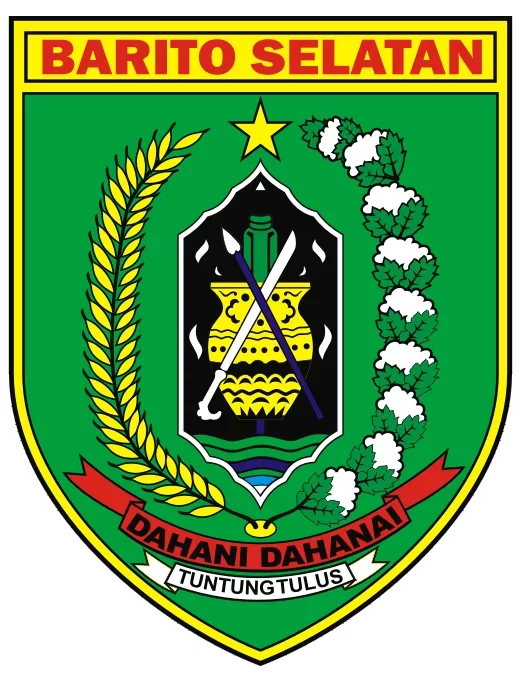
- Coat of arms
- Motto(s): "Dahani Dahanai Tuntung Tulus"; Maanyan language: "Forever be just, prosperous, safe and sound"
- Location within Central Kalimantan

- Location in Kalimantan and Indonesia South Barito Regency (Indonesia)
- Coordinates: 1.8667°S 114.7333°E
- Country: Indonesia
- Province: Central Kalimantan
- Regency seat: Buntok

Government
  - Regent: Eddy Raya Samsuri
  - Vice Regent: Khristianto Yudha

Area
  - Total: 7,020 km^{2} (2,710 sq mi)

Population (mid 2025 estimate)
  - Total: 137,055
  - Density: 19.5/km^{2} (50.6/sq mi)
- Time zone: UTC+7 (Western Indonesia Time)
- Area code: (+62) 525
- HDI (2019): ▲0.701 (High)
- Website: baritoselatankab.go.id

South Barito Regency (Indonesian: Kabupaten Barito Selatan) is a regency in Central Kalimantan province of Indonesia. On 10 April 2002 the eastern districts were split off to create a new East Barito Regency, while the residual South Barito District has an area of 7,020 km^{2}. The regency seat is located in the town of Buntok, located in South Dusun district. The population of South Barito Regency was 124,128 at the 2010 Census and 131,140 at the 2020 Census; the official estimate as at mid 2025 was 137,055 (comprising 69,940 males and 67,710 females).

== History ==
It was part of Sultanate of Banjar, but ceded to Dutch East Indies in 1849. The region was previously known as Dusun Ilir. Later, the region became part of Kewedanan Barito Hilir, which the new Indonesian government inherited after independence. Later together with Kewedanan of East Barito, it was merged into single Barito Regency under newly formed Central Kalimantan province with capital in Muara Teweh. However, it was split again into several regencies in January 1959, becoming South Barito and North Barito.

== Geography ==
Land formation in the regency is considered old and relatively not considered fertile. Soil mostly consist of alluvium sediments from rivers and peat in swamp regions, with little to no volcanic material. Alluvium sediments were found along the banks of Barito river, making around 41.5% of soil formation in the regency, while further from the river other soil type such as regosol could be found.

Regency's topography is flat and low-lying but on the most part except on northern parts where mountain ranges could be found. The regency's low-lying regions are wetlands and swamps with little variations.

== Economy ==
The regency's economy is dominated by agriculture and fishery which consist of 19.34% of its gross regional product as of 2020. Second largest sector is mining with 13.43%, followed by transportation and logistic service with 12.24%, and trade sector with 8.52%. Mining is rapidly declining with decrease of 15.55% in 2020, while the fastest growing sector is social service and communication with increase of 21.37% and 17.69% respectively. Economic growth was 5.32% in 2019, but plummeted to -7.36% in 2020 due to the outbreak of COVID-19 pandemic in Indonesia. Due to growing reliance on service and restaurant sector especially in town of Buntok, the region has been hard hit by pandemic and restrictions it follows. However, the recent increase of information and communication sector according to Statistics Indonesia was credited to the pandemic. There are 42 active cooperation in the regency, 16 registered hotels, and 52 registered restaurants. The regency was visited by total 15,561 tourists in 2020, most of whom were domestic tourists. Majority of hotels and restaurants are located in town of Buntok.

The regency has relatively big output on fishery despite being located inland, especially from aquaculture. In 2020, in total it produces 8,766 tons of freshwater fish from aquaculture. On the same year, fish catches figure were 6,657 tons of freshwater fish. According to Statistics Indonesia, in 2020, livestock population in the regency is dominated by pigs with figure of 14,259 followed by water buffalo with 9,794.

Agriculture output in the regency in 2020 includes 13,044 tons of harvested paddy from ricefield, 87.1 tons of chili, 37.7 tons of tomato, 65.3 tons of long beans, 27.7 tons of water spinach, 29.1 tons of spinach, and 67.8 tons of cucumber. In addition, the regency produces 32.5 tons of melons, 214 tons of watermelons, and 73.1 tons of eggplants. Poverty rate was 6.12%.

== Demographics ==
The regency had a population of 131,100 at the 2020 Census, and this was estimated to have grown to 137,055 by mid 2025. Unlike regions around it, it has low population growth with figure of 0.53% in 2020. Life expectancy was 67 years which is lower than national average, and literacy rate was 99.75%. Sex ratio on the regency was 105, which means there are on average 105 men per 100 female population. This varies based on the district from Jenamas District with 101 sex ratio to North Dusun District with 107. As with most of regions in Indonesia, the population is dominated by youth on reproductive age above 15 years, consist of 66,812 people out of 131,100 in the regency.

The majority of the population in the regency are Muslims, with a figure of 98,801 people in 2020, followed by a significant minority of Protestants with 26,249, Catholics with 9,725, Hindus 4,986, and Buddhists with 2 people.

=== Climate ===
Buntok has a tropical rainforest climate (Af) with heavy rainfall year-round. Temperature is relatively warm during the day up to 34 Celsius and could be as low as 20 Celsius at night. Rainfall yearly average is recorded on 325.6 milliliters and wind speed on 4.3 knots. June is the wettest month with recorder average of 720.9 milliliters of rainfall while the driest month is in August with just 81.9 milliliters.

Climate data for Buntok
Month	Jan	Feb	Mar	Apr	May	Jun	Jul	Aug	Sep	Oct	Nov	Dec	Year
Mean daily maximum °C (°F)	29.5 (85.1)	30.1 (86.2)	30.3 (86.5)	30.6 (87.1)	30.7 (87.3)	30.4 (86.7)	30.5 (86.9)	31.0 (87.8)	31.2 (88.2)	31.1 (88.0)	30.5 (86.9)	30.0 (86.0)	30.5 (86.9)
Daily mean °C (°F)	25.9 (78.6)	26.4 (79.5)	26.5 (79.7)	26.7 (80.1)	26.9 (80.4)	26.5 (79.7)	26.4 (79.5)	26.7 (80.1)	26.9 (80.4)	26.8 (80.2)	26.6 (79.9)	26.3 (79.3)	26.6 (79.8)
Mean daily minimum °C (°F)	22.4 (72.3)	22.7 (72.9)	22.8 (73.0)	22.9 (73.2)	23.1 (73.6)	22.6 (72.7)	22.3 (72.1)	22.5 (72.5)	22.7 (72.9)	22.6 (72.7)	22.7 (72.9)	22.7 (72.9)	22.7 (72.8)
Average rainfall mm (inches)	294 (11.6)	248 (9.8)	293 (11.5)	280 (11.0)	250 (9.8)	166 (6.5)	129 (5.1)	110 (4.3)	150 (5.9)	168 (6.6)	292 (11.5)	312 (12.3)	2,692 (105.9)
Source: Climate-Data.org

== Governance ==
=== Administrative districts ===
South Barito Regency consists of six districts (kecamatan), tabulated below with their areas and their population totals from the 2010 Census and the 2020 Census, together with the official estimates as at mid 2025. The 2020 figures are rounded to the nearest 100 persons. The table also includes the locations of the district administrative centres, the number of administrative villages in each district (a total of 86 rural desa and 8 urban kelurahan - the latter comprising 3 towns in Dusun Selatan District together with the administrative centres of the other 5 districts), and its postal codes.

Kode Wilayah	Name of District (kecamatan)	Area in km^{2}	Pop'n Census 2010	Pop'n Census 2020	Pop'n Estimate mid 2025	Admin centre	No. of villages	Post codes
62.04.01	Jenamas	662	9,071	8,709	8,830	Rantau Kujang	5	73763
62.04.02	Dusun Hilir (Lower Dusun)	1,170	15,617	15,737	16,015	Mengkatip	10	73762
62.04.03	Karau Kuala	825	15,375	15,046	15,255	Bangkuang	11	73761
62.04.06	Dusun Selatan (South Dusun)	1,133	49,748	56,233	60,494	Buntok Kota	27 ^{(a)}	73751 ^{(b)}
62.04.04	Dusun Utara (North Dusun)	1,272	16,318	16,587	16,951	Pengang	19	73752
62.04.05	Gunung Bintang Awai	1,758	17,999	18,800	19,510	Tabak Kanilan	21	73753
	Totals	7,020	124,128	131,140	137,055	Buntok Kota	93	

Notes: (a) including 3 kelurahan - Buntok Kota (with 15,969 inhabitants in 2024), Hilir Seper (14,996 inhabitants) and Jelapat (3,010 inhabitants).
(b) Only nine villages had the postcode of 73751, while the town of Buntok Kota had 73711, the town of Hilir Seper (which is the southern part of the Buntok urban area) had 73712, and the town of Jelapat and fifteen rural villages shared the postcode of 73713.

=== Local government ===
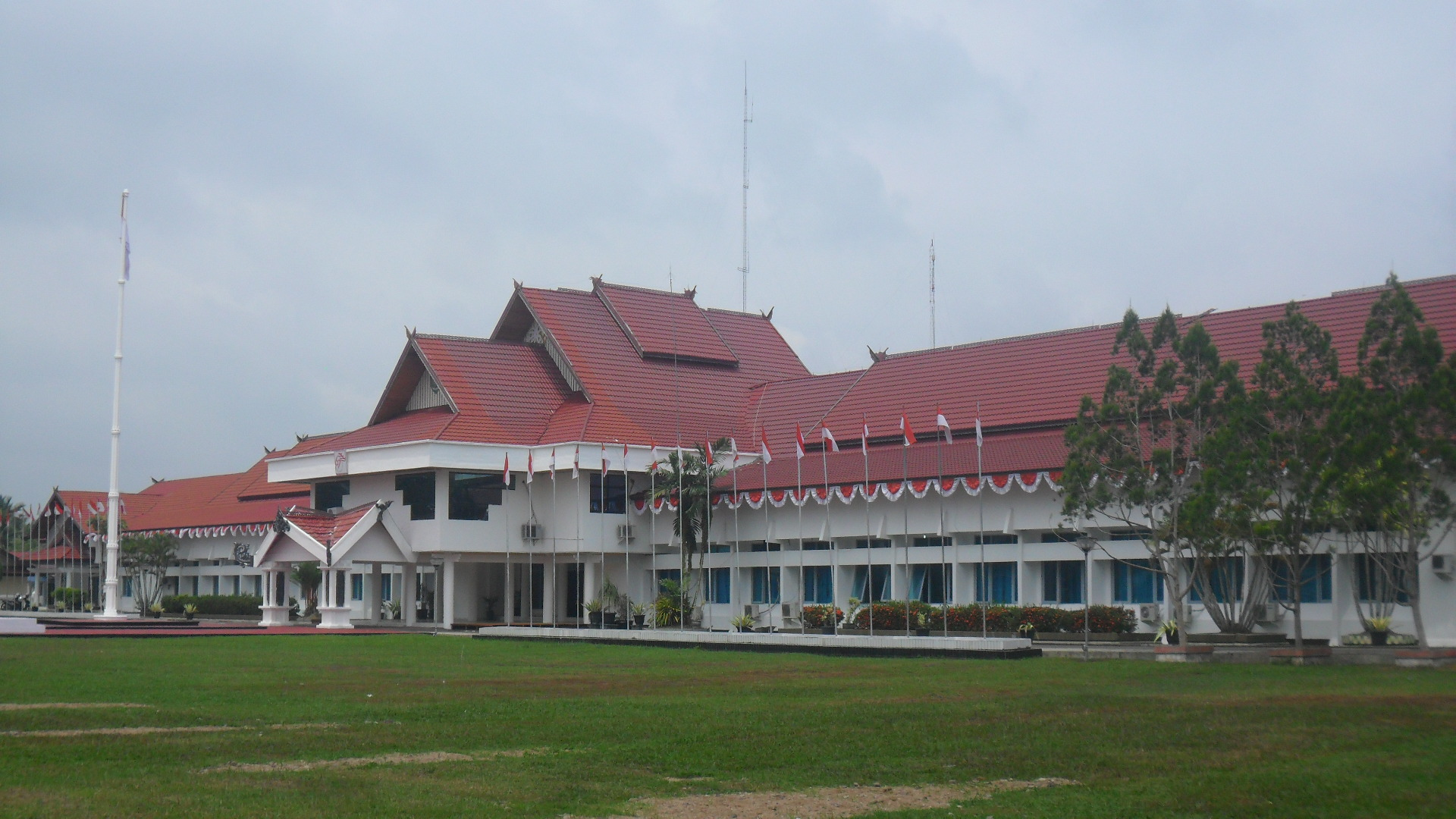
Regent office of South Barito

It is a second-level administrative division equivalent to a city. As a regency, it is headed by a regent who is elected democratically. Head of districts are appointed directly by the regent with the recommendation of the regency secretary. Executive power lies with the regent and vice regent while legislative function is exercised by the regency's parliament.

=== Politics ===
The regency is part of 4th Central Kalimantan electoral district, together with North Barito, Murung Raya, and East Barito Regency which together have 9 out of 45 representatives in provincial parliament. On regency level, it is divided into three electoral districts. Regency parliament has in total 25 representatives that are elected by the people of the regency in an election. Last election was in 2019 and the next one would be in 2024.

Electoral District	Region	Representatives
South Barito 1st	South Dusun District	11
South Barito 2nd	North Dusun and Gunung Bintang Awai District	7
South Barito 3rd	Dusun Hilir, Jenamas, and Karau Kuala District	7
Total		25

== Infrastructure ==
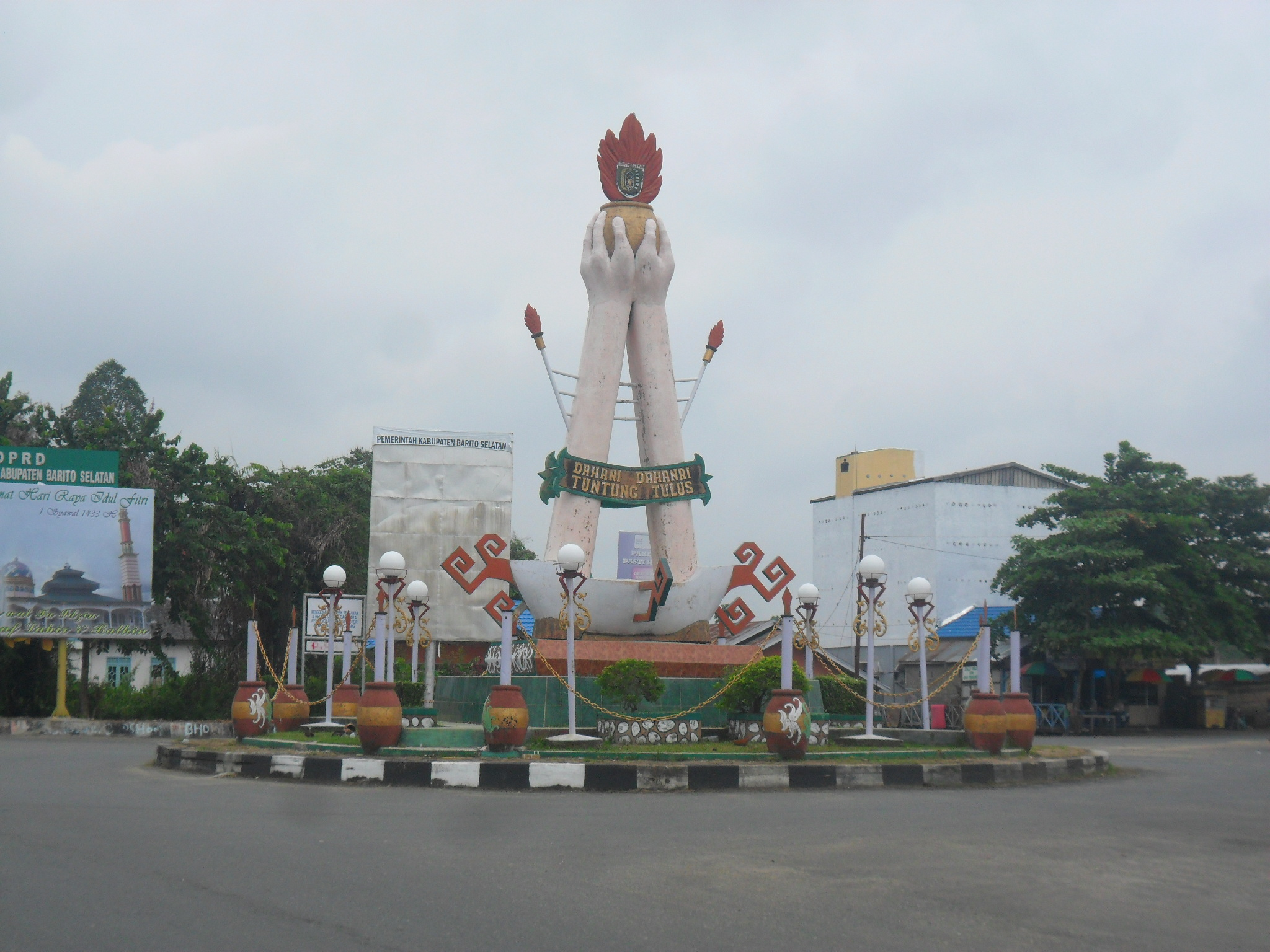
A roundabout at Buntok

=== Education ===
In 2020, there were 108 kindergartens, 184 elementary schools, 79 junior high schools, 34 senior high schools, in addition to five vocational high schools. In addition, there were two higher education institutions in the regency, both of them located in South Dusun District. All of the higher education institutions in the regency are private as at 2020. One of them is Dahani Dahanai Economy College, which offers bachelor in management. The other one is Al Ma'arif Islamic College which focus on Islam-related subjects.

The town of Buntok also has one public library owned by the regency government. In 2016, government of the regency stated that it would construct 10 smaller libraries in 10 villages.

=== Healthcare ===
On healthcare, there is one hospital located in the town of Buntok, two polyclinics, 64 puskesmas, and six registered pharmacies in the regency. Jaraga Sasameh Regional Hospital, the only hospital in the regency, is public owned by the regency government. The hospital is classified as C-class by Ministry of Health. Other than that, there are three registered medical clinics, 161 healthcare centers, 143 family planning clinics, and two maternity hospitals.

=== Transportation ===
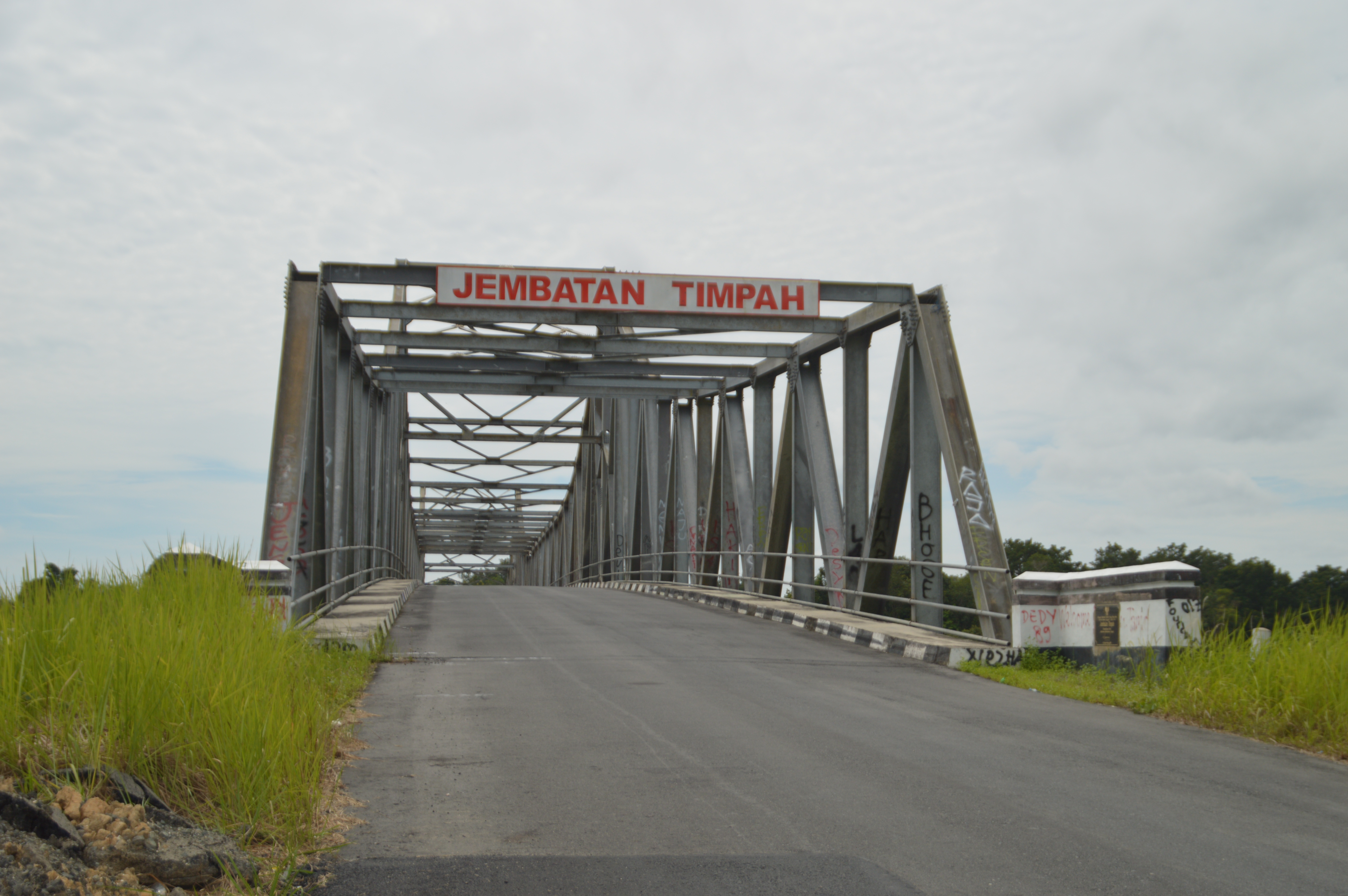
A bridge in South Barito Regency

There is a total of 1,139.79 kilometres of road in the regency, the majority of which is maintained by the regency government. 328.73 kilometres have been paved with asphalt, with the rest being either concrete, gravel, or other surfaces. Despite being located inland, the regency has passenger ports utilizing the Barito River, such as at Buntok and Jelapat. The regency is served by Sanggu Airport, located in town of Buntok, with regular flights to major cities in Kalimantan such as Palangka Raya and Banjarmasin. The airport was planned to be expanded to accommodate bigger planes in 2020.

The regency is connected to main cities in Kalimantan such as Banjarmasin and Balikpapan by bus, mainly served by Perum DAMRI.

=== Others ===
Each district has one garbage dump facility except South Dusun District, which has nine. There are exactly 348 mosques, 137 Protestant churches, 30 Catholic churches, and one Hindu temple; In 2020, there are 57 registered market center facilities in the regency.

The regency has several parks concentrated mostly on the town of Buntok (including its southern extension of Hilir Seper), such as Iring Witu Park which has become center of street foods in the town. The regency government has taken initiative to make the park center of culinary tourism in the regency. Other park in the town, Rusa Park (literally means "Deer Park), has deer population roaming around and visitors often feed the deer. Other than that, the park also hosts a landmark of the town, a deer statue in the middle of the park. It also has playground for children and a Wi-Fi hotspot. Regency government also has plan to convert ex-dump facility into another park on early 2021.

The regency also has a stadium located in the town of Buntok, named Batuah Stadium.
