= Siang language =

Austronesian language spoken in Kalimantan, Indonesia

Siang
- Ot Siang
- Native to: Indonesia
- Region: Kalimantan
- Native speakers: (60,000 cited 1981)
- Language family: Austronesian: Malayo-Polynesian; West Barito; North; Siang

Language codes
- ISO 639-3: sya
- Glottolog: sian1254

Siang, or Ot Siang, is a Barito language of the central Kalimantan, Indonesia.

== Vocabulary ==
Comparison of vocabulary in dialects of North West Barito languages
	Murung	Siang
one	ičɔ’	ičɔ
five	limɔ’	ʎimɔ’
ash	aβu’	aβu
rain	učan	učan
house	lɔpɔ	ʎopou
fire	apui	apui
sun	matanondou	matanɔndou
wild pig	baβui	baβui
