= West Barito languages =

Group of Austronesian languages

West Barito
- Geographic distribution: south Borneo (South Kalimantan, Indonesia)
- Linguistic classification: Austronesian: Malayo-Polynesian; (Barito); West Barito

Language codes
- Glottolog: west2561

The West Barito languages are a group of half a dozen Dayak (Austronesian) languages of Borneo, Indonesia. They are named after the Barito River.

== Subgrouping ==
The languages are:

Map showing the locations in Borneo of the Southwest Barito languages Bakumpai and Ngaju.

- Northwest Barito
  - Kohin
  - Dohoi (Ot Danum)
  - Siang
- Southwest Barito
  - Mendawai
  - Bakumpai
  - Berangas (possibly a Bakumpai dialect)
  - Ngaju
