= Buntok =

Buntok Buntok Kota
- Regency seat
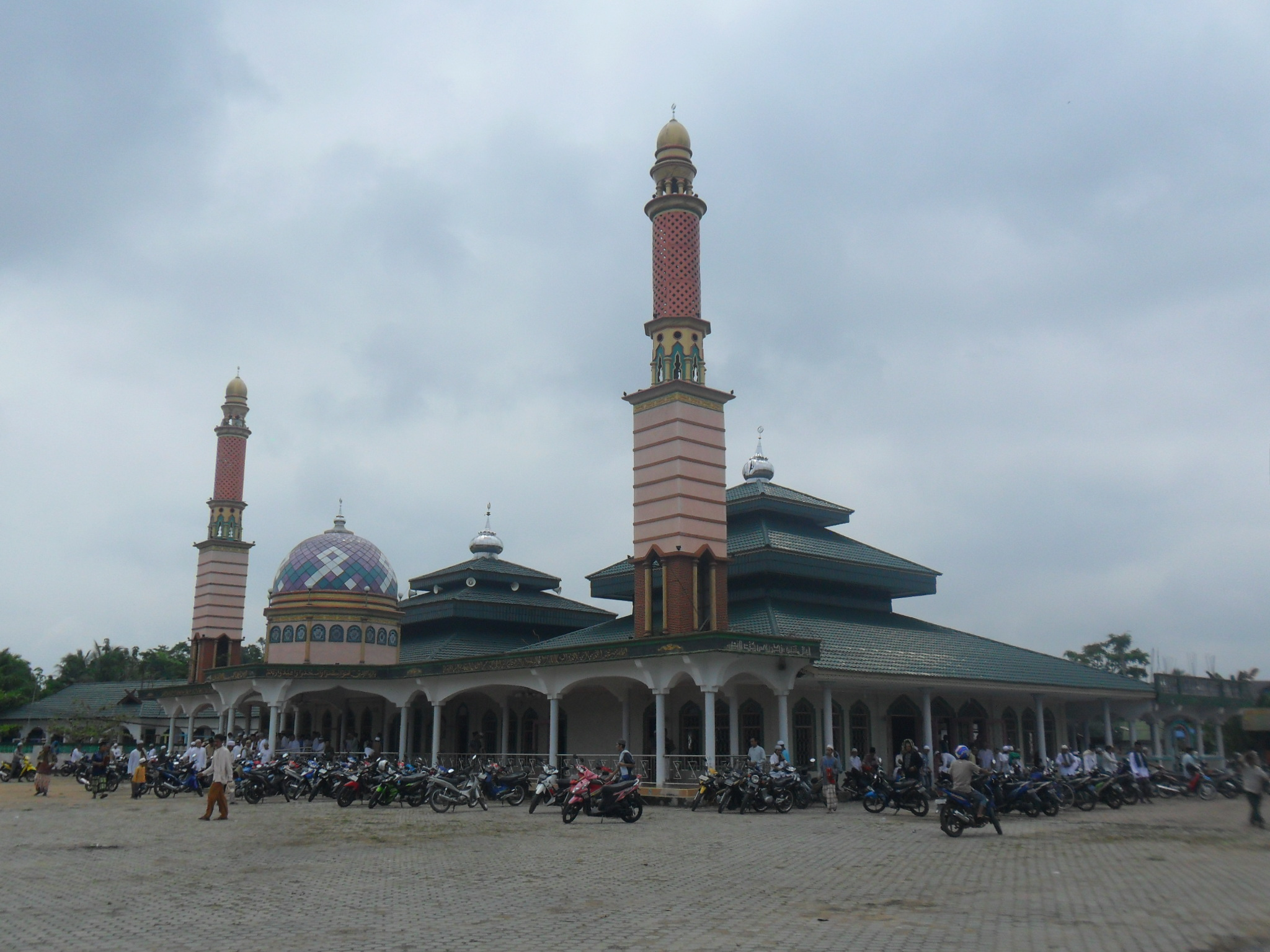
- Baiturrahman Great Mosque of Buntok

- Location in Central Kalimantan, Indonesia Buntok (Indonesia)
- Coordinates: 1°43′09″S 114°50′41″E
- Country: Indonesia
- Province: Central Kalimantan
- Regency: South Barito Regency
- District: Dusun Selatan

Area
  - Total: 114 km^{2} (44 sq mi)
- Elevation: 28 m (92 ft)

Population (2025)
  - Total: 30,965
  - Density: 272/km^{2} (700/sq mi)
- Time zone: UTC+7 (Western Indonesian Time)
- Postal code: 73711
- Area code: +62525

Buntok (abbreviated: BTK), a town in the administrative district (kecamatan) of Dusun Selatan, is the regency seat of South Barito Regency and also one of the towns in Central Kalimantan province, Indonesia. This town is composed of two urban kelurahan - a northern one called Buntok Kota (72 km^{2}) and a southern one called Hilir Seper (42 km^{2}), although the whole town is also called Buntok by the people from Central Kalimantan. This town is at a distance of 197 km east of Palangka Raya city, the capital of Central Kalimantan Province. The population of Buntok Kota kelurahan was 15,969 people as of 2024, while Hilir Seper kelurahan had 14,996 people.

== Geography ==
Buntok Kota, Central Kalimantan

Climate chart (precipitation, max. and min. temperature)
J	F	M	A	M	J	J	A	S	O	N	D
302 31 23	251 31 23	309 31 23	261 31 24	202 31 24	148 31 23	114 31 23	87 32 23	100 33 24	181 32 24	305 31 24	332 31 23
- █ Average max. and min. temperatures in °C
- █ Precipitation totals in mm
- Source: Climate-Data.org & BMKG
Imperial conversion
J	F	M	A	M	J	J	A	S	O	N	D
12 88 74	9.9 88 74	12 88 74	10 88 75	8 88 75	5.8 88 74	4.5 88 73	3.4 90 74	3.9 91 74	7.1 90 75	12 88 74	13 88 74
- █ Average max. and min. temperatures in °F
- █ Precipitation totals in inches

Buntok is precisely located at 1.71903 degrees South and 114.84475 degrees East, and is situated to the east of Palangka Raya, the capital of Central Kalimantan which is about 197 km distant. The total area of this town is around 114 km² (for the two kelurahan) which makes it roughly 1.6% of the total area of South Barito Regency.

Buntok is crossed by the Barito River as it is one of the towns located in the Barito River basin. This town is situated on the flatlands of eastern Central Kalimantan with the altitude being 13 to 30 metres above sea level. As any other town in Kalimantan, Buntok experiences tropical rainforest climate (Af) with high amounts of precipitation nearly all year long, constant humidity and warm-to-hot temperature above 21 °C.

== Demographics ==
The total population of Buntok Kota as of 2021 is 16,774 inhabitants which represents 28% of the population of Dusun Selatan district and 12.7% of the entire population of South Barito Regency. The population density of this town is about 233 people/km². Buntok Kota has approximately 5,262 households and the average household size of the town is roughly 3.18 people. The sex ratio in Buntok Kota is equally 100 which means there are 100 males to every 100 females.

== Education ==
As of 2021, there are currently 22 primary schools (19 public schools and three private schools), seven middle schools (three public schools and four private schools), six high schools (three public schools and three private schools), one public vocational school, one economic college, and one Islamic college.

== Facilities ==
For healthcare facility, Buntok currently has one general hospital, three polyclinics, one public health centre, and seven pharmacies. For economic & trade facility, this town recently has five shopping complexes, two markets, six convenience shops, many grocery stores, 25 restaurants, 22 food stalls, six hotels, and seven inns. For religious facility, Buntok has 28 Islamic religious facilities, ten Protestant churches, and one Catholic church. The town is also served by the Sanggu Airport located in the neighbouring village of Sanggu.
