= Ngaju language =

Austronesian language spoken in Kalimantan, Indonesia

Ngaju
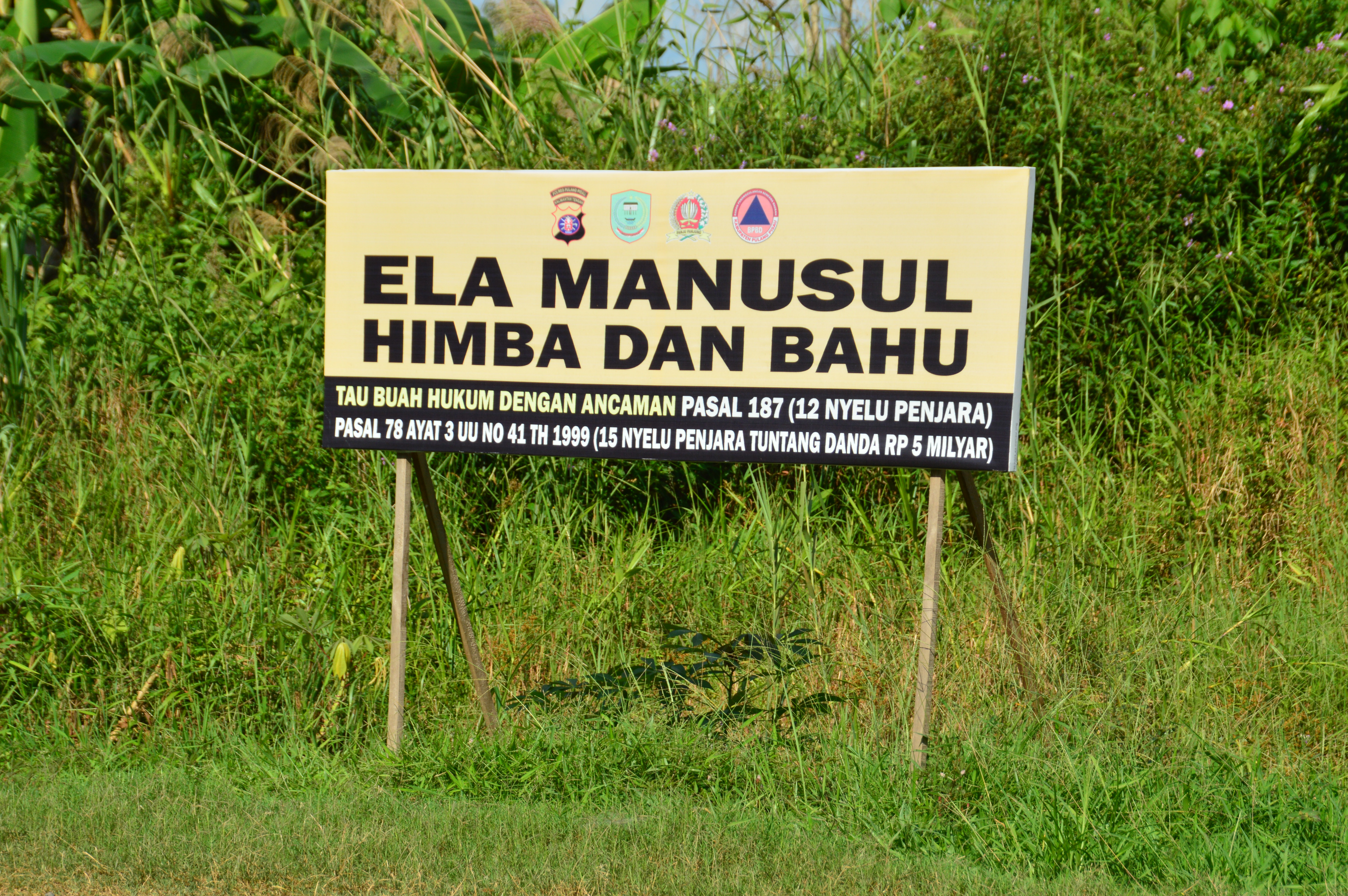
- Warning sign prohibiting land burning in Ngaju language
- Native to: Indonesia
- Region: Kalimantan
- Ethnicity: Ngaju
- Native speakers: 890,000 (2003)
- Language family: Austronesian: Malayo-Polynesian; West Barito; South; Ngaju

Language codes
- ISO 639-3: nij
- Glottolog: ngaj1237
- Map showing distribution of Ngaju language (green)

Ngaju (also Ngaju Dayak/Dayak Ngaju) is an Austronesian language spoken along the Kapuas, Kahayan, Katingan, and Mentaya Rivers in Central Kalimantan, Indonesia. It is closely related to the Bakumpai language. There are three dialects—Pulau Petak (Pulopetak), Ba'amang, and Mantangai.

== Phonology ==
=== Consonants ===
Ngaju has the following consonants.

Ngaju consonants
	Biabial		Coronal		Palatal		Velar		Glottal
Nasal		m		n		ɲ		ŋ	
Stop	p	b	t	d	c	ɟ	k	g	
Fricative			s						h
Approximant (Lateral)						j		w	
Approximant (Lateral)				l					
Trill				r					

=== Vowels ===
Ngaju has the following vowels. All vowels except ə can be long.

Ngaju vowels
	Front	Central	Back rounded
High	i		u
Mid	e	ə	o
Low		a	

== Orthography ==
=== Vowels and diphthongs ===
- a – [a]
- e – [e/ə]
- i – [i]
- o – [o]
- u – [u]
- ai – [aj]
- au – [aw]
- ei – [ej]

=== Consonants ===
- b – [b]
- c – [c]
- d – [d]
- g – [g]
- h – [h]
- j – [ɟ]
- k – [k/ʔ]
- l – [l]
- m – [m]
- n – [n]
- ng – [ŋ]
- ny – [ɲ]
- p – [p]
- r – [r]
- s – [s]
- t – [t]
- w – [w]
- y – [j]

== Vocabulary ==
Vocabulary comparison between Bakumpai, Ngaju, Indonesian and English languages.

Bakumpai	Ngaju	Indonesian	English
Jida	Dia	Tidak	No
Beken	Beken	Bukan	Not
Pai	Pai	Kaki	Foot/Leg
Kueh	Kueh	Mana	Which/Where
Si-kueh	Bara-kueh	Dari mana	Where from
Hituh	Hetuh	Sini	Here
Si-hituh	Intu-hetuh	Di sini	Here
Bara	Bara	Dari	From
Kejaw	Kejaw	Jauh	Far
Tukep/Parak	Tukep	Dekat	Near
Kuman	Kuman	Makan	Eat
Mihup	Mihop	Minum	Drink
Lebu	Lewu	Kampung	Village
Batatapas	Bapukan	Mencuci pakaian	To wash clothes
