= Dusun Malang language =

Austronesian language spoken in Kalimantan, Indonesia

Malang
- Dusun Malang
- Native to: Indonesia
- Region: Kalimantan
- Native speakers: 4,500 (2003)
- Language family: Austronesian: Malayo-Polynesian; East Barito; South; Malang
- Dialects: Bayan; Dusun Malang

Language codes
- ISO 639-3: duq
- Glottolog: dusu1269

Dusun Malang, or Malang, is a language spoken by the Dusun people of Borneo. It is closely related to the Malagasy language.
