= Central Kalimantan =

Province in Kalimantan, Indonesia

Central Kalimantan Kalimantan Tengah
- Province
- Province of Central Kalimantan; Provinsi Kalimantan Tengah
- Coat of arms
- Nickname: Bumi Tambun Bungai (Dayak) "Land of Courage and advantage"
- Motto: Isen Mulang (Ngaju) "Persistent"
- Central Kalimantan in Indonesia
- Interactive map of Central Kalimantan
- Coordinates: 2°13′S 113°55′E
- Country: Indonesia
- Region: Kalimantan (Western Indonesia)
- Founded: 2 July 1958
- Established: 14 July 1950
- Capital and largest city: Palangka Raya

Government
  - Body: Central Kalimantan Provincial Government
  - Governor: Agustiar Sabran (Gerindra)
  - Vice Governor: Edy Pratowo
  - Legislature: Central Kalimantan Regional House of Representatives (DPRD)

Area
  - Total: 153,430.36 km^{2} (59,239.79 sq mi)
  - Rank: 1st
- Highest elevation (Bukit Raya): 2,300 m (7,546 ft)

Population (mid 2025 Estimate)
  - Total: 2,844,992
  - Density: 18.54256/km^{2} (48.02502/sq mi)

Demographics
  - Ethnic groups: 46% Dayak; 22% Javanese; 21% Banjarese; 3.9% Malay; 1.9% Madurese; 4.8% other
  - Religion (2021): 74.11% Islam; 16.67% Protestant; 5.84% Hinduism/Kaharingan; 3.23% Catholic; 0.11% Buddhism; 0.1% other
  - Languages: Indonesian (official); Ngaju; Banjar; Ma'anyan; Malay (regional)
- Time zone: UTC+7 (Western Indonesian Time)
- GDP (nominal): 2022
- Total: Rp 199.9 trillion (21st); US$ 13.5 billion Int$ 42.0 billion (PPP)
- Per capita: Rp 72.9 million (9th); US$ 4,913; Int$ 15,329 (PPP)
- Growth: ▲6.45%
- HDI (2024): ▲0.743 (19th) – high
- Website: kalteng.go.id

Central Kalimantan (Indonesian: Kalimantan Tengah) is a province of Indonesia. It is one of five provinces in Kalimantan, the Indonesian part of Borneo. It is the largest province in Indonesia by area since 2022, bordered by West Kalimantan to the west, South Kalimantan and East Kalimantan to the east, Java Sea to the south and is separated narrowly from North Kalimantan and Malaysia by East Kalimantan's Mahakam Ulu Regency. Its provincial capital is Palangka Raya and in 2010 its population was over 2.2 million, while the 2020 Census showed a total of almost 2.67 million; the official estimate as at mid 2025 was 2,844,992 (comprising 1,467,139 males and 1,377,853 females).

The population growth rate was almost 3.0% per annum between 1990 and 2000, one of the highest provincial growth rates in Indonesia during that time; in the subsequent decade to 2010 the average annual growth rate slowed markedly to around 1.8%, but it rose again in the decade beginning 2010. More than is the case in other provinces on Kalimantan, Central Kalimantan is populated by the Dayaks, the indigenous inhabitants of Borneo.

== History ==
Since the eighteenth century the central region of Kalimantan and its Dayak inhabitants were ruled by the Muslim Sultanate of Banjar. Following Indonesian independence after World War II, Dayak tribes demanded a province separate from South Kalimantan province.

In 1957 South Kalimantan was divided to provide the Dayak population with greater autonomy from the Muslim population in the province. The change was approved by the Indonesian Government on 23 May 1957 under Presidential Law No. 10 Year 1957, which declared Central Kalimantan the seventeenth province of Indonesia. President Sukarno appointed the Dayak-born national hero Tjilik Riwut as the first Governor and designated Palangkaraya as the provincial capital.

== Geography ==
Central Kalimantan is the largest Indonesian province by area (Papua Province held this position until its 2022 partition) with a size of 153,430.36 km^{2} (59,239.79 sq mi), about 1.5 times the size of the island of Java, and it is slightly larger than Bangladesh or the U.S. state of Illinois or Murmansk Oblast. It is bordered by West Kalimantan and East Kalimantan provinces to the north, by the Java Sea to the south, by South Kalimantan and East Kalimantan provinces to the east, and by West Kalimantan province to west.

The Schwaner Mountains stretch from the north-east of the province to the south-west, 80% of which is covered in dense forest, peatland swamps, mangroves, rivers and traditional agriculture land. Highland areas in the north-east are remote and not easily accessible. Non-volcanic mounts are scattered in this area including Kengkabang, Samiajang, Liang Pahang and Ulu Gedang.

The centre of the province is covered with tropical forest, which produces rattan, resin and valuable timber such as Ulin and Meranti. The southern lowlands are dominated by peatland swamps that intersect with many rivers. Sabangau National Park is a protected peatland area internationally acknowledged as sanctuary for the endangered Orangutan. Recently the peat swamp forests have been damaged by the Mega Rice Project, which unsuccessfully sought to turn large areas into rice paddies.

The province's climate is wet weather equatorial zone with an eight-month rainy season, and 4 months of dry season. Rainfall or precipitation is 2,776—3,393 mm per year with an average of 145 rainy days annually.

=== Rivers ===
Central Kalimantan has numerous rivers, generally flowing southwards from the catchment areas in the north in the Schwaner Mountains, down to the Java Sea. The major rivers (with their lengths) include:

- Barito River (900 km)
- Kapuas River (600 km)
- Kahayan River (600 km)
- Katingan River (600 km)
- Mentaya (Sampit) River (400 km)
- Seruyan River (350 km)
- Lamandau River (300 km)
- Arut River (250 km)
- Sabangau River (200 km)
- Kumai River (179 km)
- Jelai River (100 km)

Note: (a) Not to be confused with the Kapuas River in West Kalimantan province.

Rivers are an important mode of transportation and a primary location for settlement. With relatively undeveloped infrastructure, the province's economy relies heavily on the rivers.

== Ecology ==
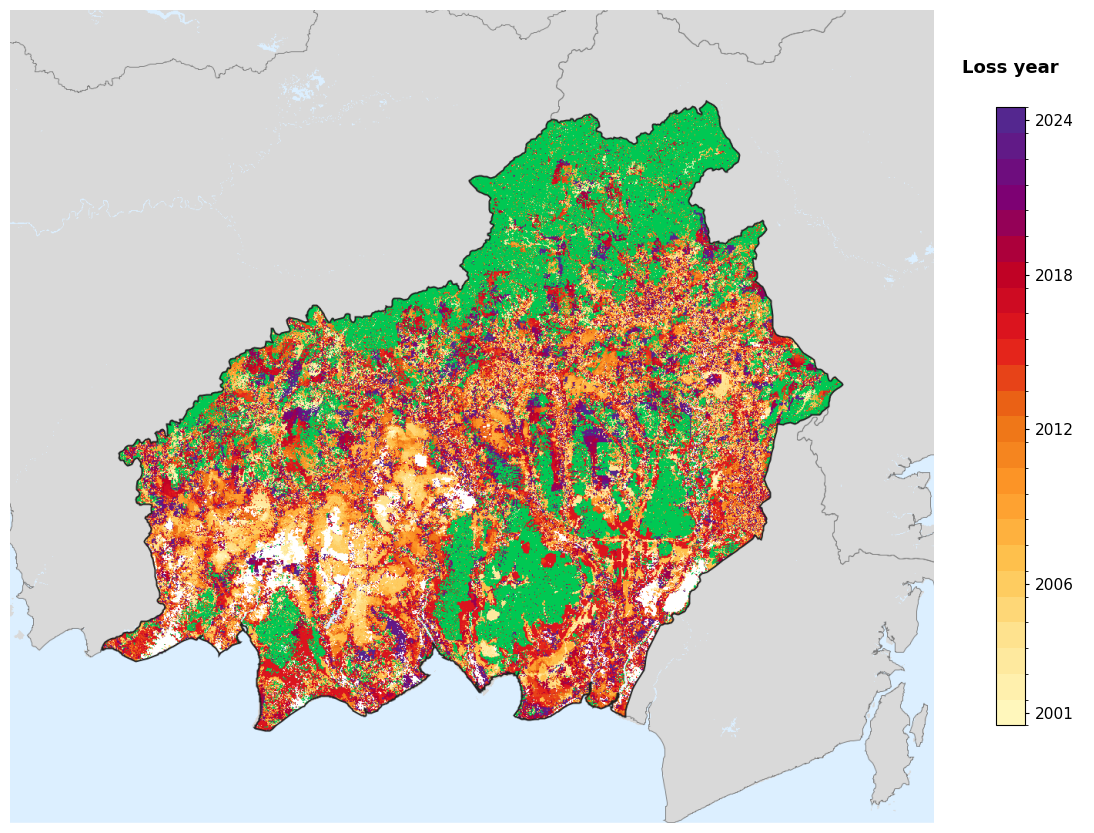
Tree-cover loss year in Central Kalimantan, 2001-2024, from the Global Forest Change dataset.

Based upon the research of the Indonesian Ministry of Environment and Forestry, Central Kalimantan comprises approximately ten different ecological regions. The two main ecological regions are the peat ecoregion which covers 26% of the total area of Central Kalimantan and the fluvial plain ecoregion which covers 21% of the whole area of Central Kalimantan. Due to its high concentration of the peat ecological region, Central Kalimantan is prone to drought and peat fires during the dry season and inundation during the rainy season within each episodes of the ENSO and the IOD. These situations have worsened because of massive deforestation in the region and climate change.

Central Kalimantan is also home for many endemic floras and faunas like orangutans, proboscis monkeys, hornbill birds, rattan, Bornean iron wood, etc. This province currently has three national parks i.e. Sabangau National Park, Tanjung Puting National Park, and Bukit Baka Bukit Raya National Park which are home to the endemic floras and faunas of Kalimantan.

== Government and administrative divisions ==
Central Kalimantan Province, when separated from South Kalimantan in 1958, comprised three regencies (kabupaten) - Barito, Kapuas and Kotawaringin. However on 26 June 1959 two of these were split - Barito Regency was divided into a South Barito Regency and a North Barito Regency, while Kotawaringin Regency was divided into a West Kotawaringin Regency and an East Kotawaringin Regency. On 14 June 1965 the provincial capital of Palangka Raya was split off from Kapuas Regency to form an independent city (kotamadya).

On 10 April 2002 an additional eight regencies were created by splitting existing regencies - Sukamara and Lamandau from parts of West Kotawaringin Regency, Seruyan and Katingan from parts of East Kotawaringin Regency, Pulang Pisau and Gunung Mas from parts of Kapuas Regency, East Barito from part of South Barito Regency, and Murung Raya from part of North Barito Regency. Thus the province now is administratively divided into thirteen regencies (each headed by a regent) and the single city. These are listed below with their areas and their populations at the 2010 and 2020 Censuses, together with the official estimates as at mid 2025.

Kode Wilayah	Name of City or Regency	Area in km^{2}	Pop'n 2000 Census	Pop'n 2010 Census	Pop'n 2020 Census	Pop'n mid 2025 Estimate	Capital	HDI 2022	Location Map
62.01	West Kotawaringin; Regency (Kotawaringin Barat)	9,475.85	168,472	235,803	270,388	285,737	Pangkalan Bun	0.734 (High)	Lokasi Kalimantan Tengah Kabupaten Kotawaringin Barat
62.02	East Kotawaringin; Regency (Kotawaringin Timur)	15,541.88	308,765	374,175	428,895	452,867	Sampit	0.717 (High)	Lokasi Kalimantan Tengah Kabupaten Kotawaringin Timur
62.06	Katingan Regency	20,380.50	121,047	146,439	162,222	174,341	Kasongan	0.697 (Medium)	Lokasi Kalimantan Tengah Kabupaten Katingan
62.07	Seruyan Regency	15,211.71	92,037	139,931	162,906	177,322	Kuala Pembuang	0.682 (Medium)	Lokasi Kalimantan Tengah Kabupaten Seruyan
62.08	Sukamara Regency	3,310.13	29,561	44,952	63,464	68,978	Sukamara	0.689 (Medium)	Lokasi Kalimantan Tengah Kabupaten Sukamara
62.09	Lamandau Regency	7,632.39	47,969	63,199	97,611	105,206	Nanga Bulik	0.711 (High)	Lokasi Kalimantan Tengah Kabupaten Lamandau
62.03	Kapuas Regency	17,033.54	325,243	329,646	410,446	435,066	Kuala Kapuas	0.700 (High)	Lokasi Kalimantan Tengah Kabupaten Kapuas
62.04	South Barito Regency (Barito Selatan)	6,267.08	108,560	124,128	131,140	137,055	Buntok	0.710 (High)	Lokasi Kalimantan Tengah Kabupaten Barito Selatan
62.05	North Barito Regency (Barito Utara)	9,984.81	109,273	121,573	154,812	164,621	Muara Teweh	0.712 (High)	Lokasi Kalimantan Tengah Kabupaten Barito Utara
62.10	Gunung Mas Regency	9,305.76	74,823	96,990	135,373	148,233	Kuala Kurun	0.714 (High)	Lokasi Kalimantan Tengah Kabupaten Gunung Mas
62.11	Pulang Pisau Regency	9,650.16	111,488	120,062	134,499	140,776	Pulang Pisau	0.690 (Medium)	Lokasi Kalimantan Tengah Kabupaten Pulang Pisau
62.12	Murung Raya Regency	23,575.33	74,050	96,857	111,527	120,222	Purukcahu	0.686 (Medium)	Lokasi Kalimantan Tengah Kabupaten Murung Raya
62.13	East Barito Regency (Barito Timur)	3,212.52	71,907	97,372	113,229	120,201	Tamiang Layang	0.721 (High)	
62.71	Palangkaraya City	2,848.70	158,770	220,962	293,457	314,367	Palangkaraya	0.812 (Very High)	
	Totals	153,430.36	1,801,965	2,212,089	2,669,969	2,844,992	Palangka Raya	0.716 (High)	

The six western regencies (covering the original pre-1958 Kotawaringin Regency, have a combined area of 71,552.48 km^{2} and had a total population of 1,264,451 persons as at mid 2025. The seven eastern regencies (plus the municipality of Palangka Raya) have a combined area of 81,877.89 km^{2} and had a total population of 1,580,541 persons as at mid 2025. There has been a campaign in Kotawaringin for the six western regencies to be split away to form a separate province.

In addition to the civil service, Central Kalimantan also recognises a traditional governing system led by traditional leaders known as Damang. The province is divided into 67 traditional law areas known as Kedamangan, headed by Damang. The system is intended to culturally recognise and preserve the customs and heritage of the Dayak tribes.

The province now forms one of Indonesia's 84 national electoral districts to elect members to the People's Representative Council. The Central Kalimantan Electoral District consists of all of the 13 regencies in the province, together with the city of Palangkaraya, and elects 6 members to the People's Representative Council.

== Railways ==
In 2026, Indonesia is evaluating plans to build a 2,772-kilometre railway network across all the Kalimantan provinces to improve logistics and unlock resource-driven growth, though the project remains at an early planning stage. A principal line will stretch across Central Kalimantan from West Kalimantan to South Kalimantan.

== Demographics ==
=== Population ===
Historical population
Year	Pop.	±%
1971	701,936	—
1980	954,353	+36.0%
1990	1,396,486	+46.3%
1995	1,627,453	+16.5%
2000	1,857,000	+14.1%
2005	1,914,900	+3.1%
2010	2,207,367	+15.3%
2015	2,490,178	+12.8%
2020	2,669,969	+7.2%
2025	2,844,992	+6.6%
Source: Badan Pusat Statistik 2026 and earlier editions

The total population of Central Kalimantan was 2,669,969 people based upon the national census in 2020; the official estimate as at mid 2025 was 2,844,992. The sex ratio of this province is 107 which means there are 107 males to every 100 females. The overall population density of Central Kalimantan is only 18.54 people/km^{2}, amounting to 17.67 in the western (Kotawaringin) half and to 19.30 in the eastern half of the province.

=== Religion ===
Religion in Central Kalimantan (2022)
1. Islam (74.3%)
2. Protestantism (16.7%)
3. Hinduism and Kaharingan (5.55%)
4. Roman Catholic (3.33%)
5. Buddhism, Confucianism, and others (0.14%)

According to the Statistics on 2021, the largest religious group in Central Kalimantan province is Islam with more than 74% of its total population. Then, the second largest group is Christianity with more than 19% of its total population. The rest of the population adhere to the local belief of Kaharingan, Hinduism, and Buddhism with more than 5%.

Religious Buildings in Central Kalimantan

Darussalam Grand Mosque in Palangka Raya

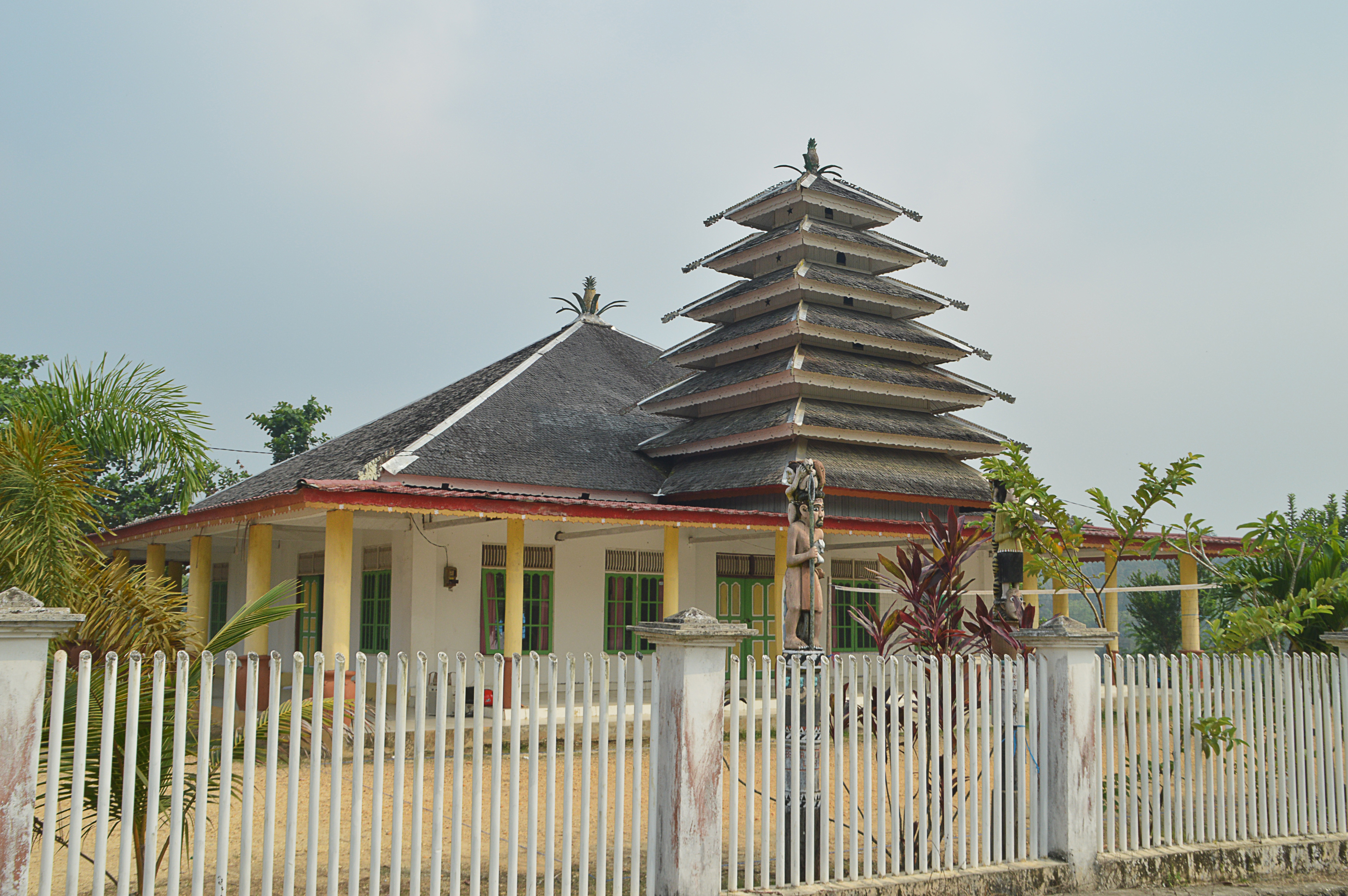
Balai Basarah Induk Intan in Muara Teweh (Kaharingan temple)

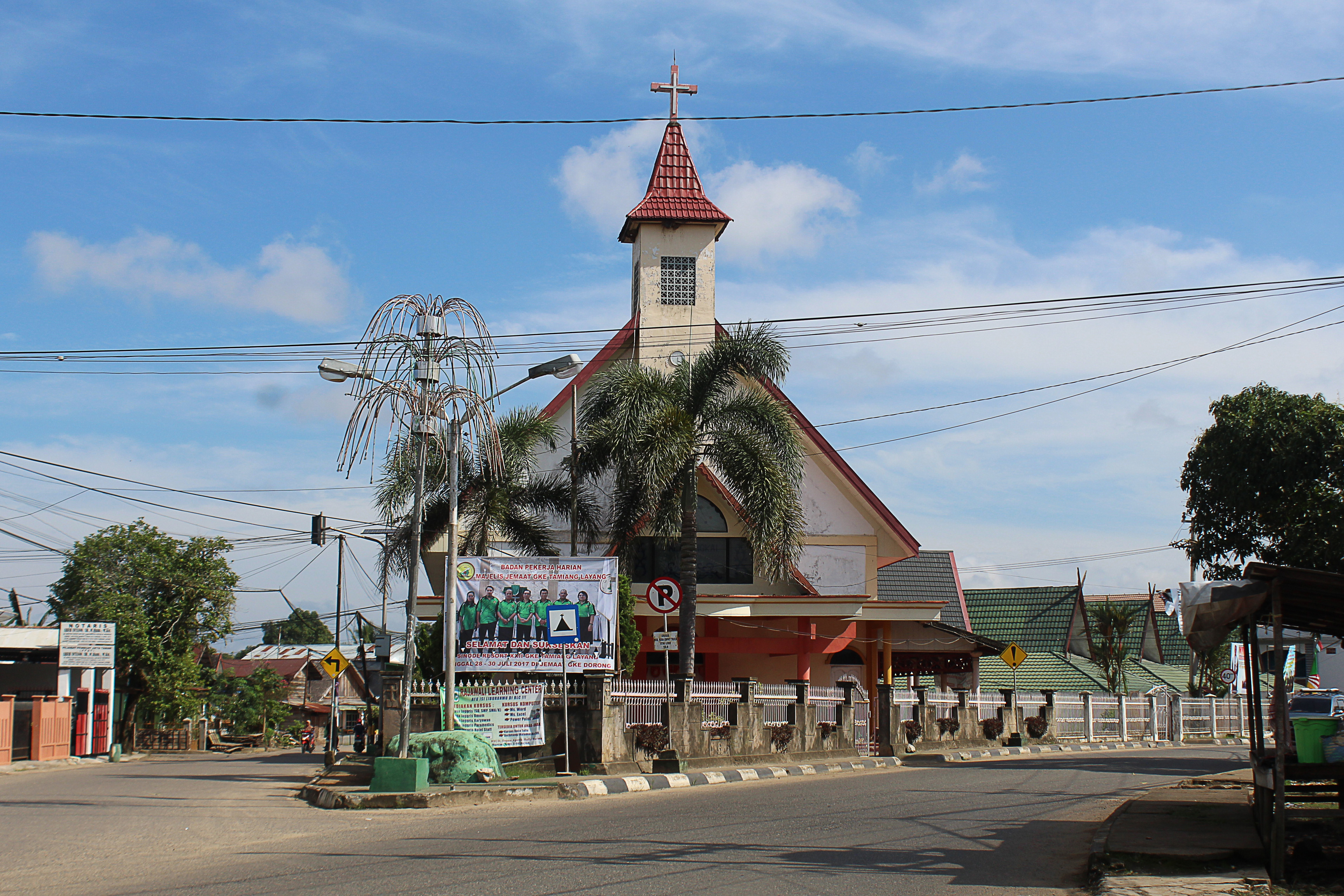
Kalimantan Evangelical Church in East Barito

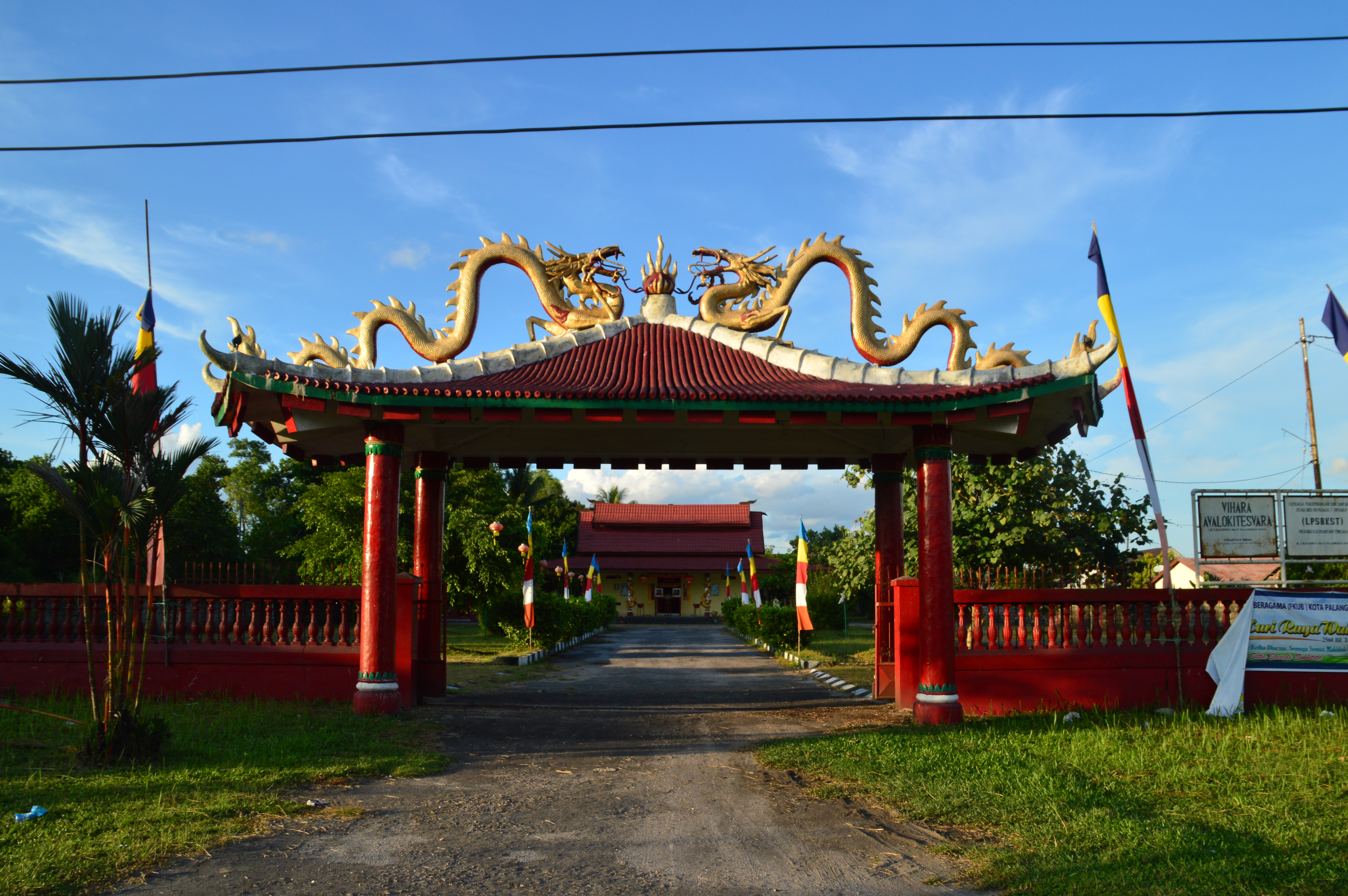
Buddhist temple with Chinese architecture in Palangka Raya

=== Ethnic groups ===
Ethnicity in Central Kalimantan (2010)
1. Dayak (46.6%)
2. Javanese (21.7%)
3. Banjarese (21.0%)
4. Malays (3.97%)
5. Madurese (1.93%)
6. Others (4.80%)

Central Kalimantan is predominantly inhabited by the Dayak people that would further be divided into three major Dayak sub-ethnics. The three major Dayak tribes in Central Kalimantan are the Ngaju, Ot Danum and Dusun Ma'anyan Ot Siang. The three major tribes extended into several branches of prominent Dayak tribes in Central Kalimantan such as Lawangan, Taboyan, Dusun Siang, Boyan, Bantian, Dohoi and Kadori.

In addition to the indigenous Dayak tribes, there are also ethnic groups from other areas of Indonesia, including Malays, Javanese, Madurese, Batak, Toraja, Ambonese, Bugis, Palembang, Minang, Banjarese, Makassar, Papuan, Balinese, Acehnese and also Chinese.

Ethnic groups and religion as per 2000 census
Ethnic group	Islam	Christian	Hindu	Other	% of population
Banjarese	100%	0%	0%	0%	24.6%
Javanese	96%	4%	0%	0%	18.8%
Ngaju Dayak	43%	44%	13%	0%	18.0%
Sampit Dayak	82%	9%	9%	0%	9.6%
Bakumpai	99%	0%	0%	0%	7.5%
Madurese	100%	0%	0%	0%	3.5%
Katingan Dayak	37%	22%	32%	9%	3.3%
Maanyan	4%	86%	9%	1%	2.8%
Tomun Dayak	18%	56%	17%	2%	2.2%
Sundanese	99%	1%	0%	0%	1.4%
Dusun Dayak	9%	29%	63%	0%	1.1%
Siang Dayak	6%	40%	48%	4%	0.9%
Manyan Dayak	20%	70%	10%	0%	0.7%
Ot Danum	10%	51%	38%	0%	0.6%
Other non-Dayak	NA	NA	NA	NA	1.3%
Other Dayak	NA	NA	NA	NA	5.0%

== Culture ==
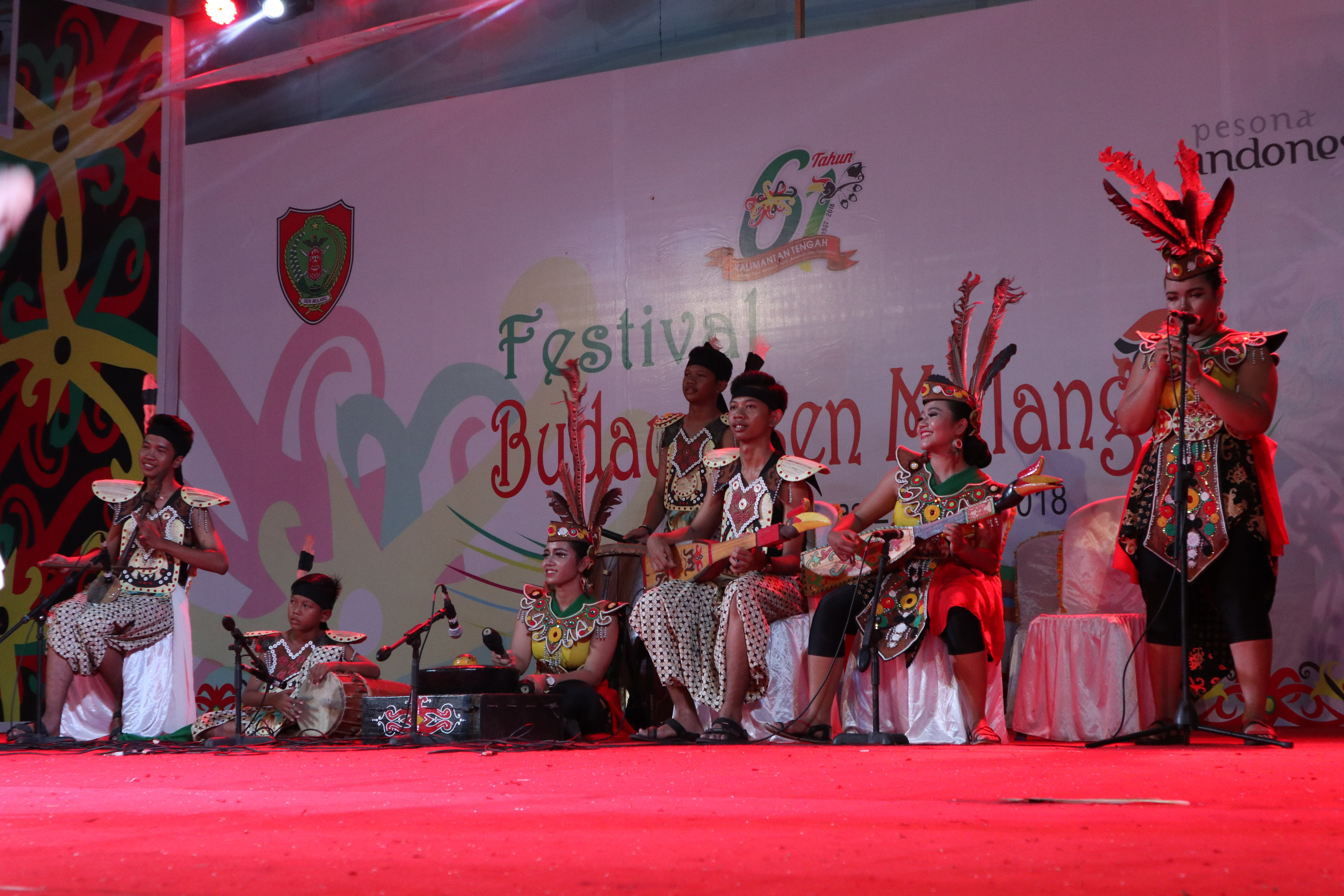
A Karungut Music Group Performance in Isen Mulang Cultural Festival in 2018. To the left of the group it can be seen that the group played three main musical instruments of Dayak people i.e. Japen or Kacapi, Gandang Manca, and Garantung.

=== Traditional music ===
The most well-known traditional musical instrument from Central Kalimantan is Japen, Garantung, and Gandang Manca which are traditional Dayak musical instruments. These musical instruments are usually played during traditional procession or ritual.

Japen or Kecapi is a lute-like instrument that is honored by Dayak people. This traditional musical instrument is usually played as an accompaniment for Central Kalimantan traditional music such as Karungut recitation, a Dayak oral literature in the form of musicalized rhyme scheme. Japen is mainly made of wood and nylon rope for its strings.

Garantung is a percussion instrument that is fairly similar to kempul in gamelan. It is a type of hanging gong that is normally played ensemble with Gandang Manca or Gandang Kembar. Gandang Manca itself is a two-headed drum of Dayak traditional musical instrument that is mainly made of wood for the body of the drum and leather membranes to cover the cavity at both ends that are tied by rattan rope. Both Garantung and Gandang Manca are commonly played ensembly as an accompaniment for Dayak traditional processions and rituals.

=== Traditional architecture ===
The most notable fine arts of Dayak people is the traditional house. The traditional house of Dayak people in Central Kalimantan is commonly called Huma Betang. Huma Betang or simply called Betang like many other traditional houses in Indonesia is built on stilts. This traditional house structure is mainly made of iron wood which is commonly anti-termite and resistant to high humidity, thus the house can stand up to hundreds of years. Huma Betang is very well-known for its huge and long size. The length of this house structure is usually between 30 and 150 metres, the width is somewhere between 5 and 30 metres, and the height is approximately 3 to 6 metres. Due to its huge and long size, this house can be occupied by up to 150 people and usually inhabited by one big family.

Huma Betang Structures

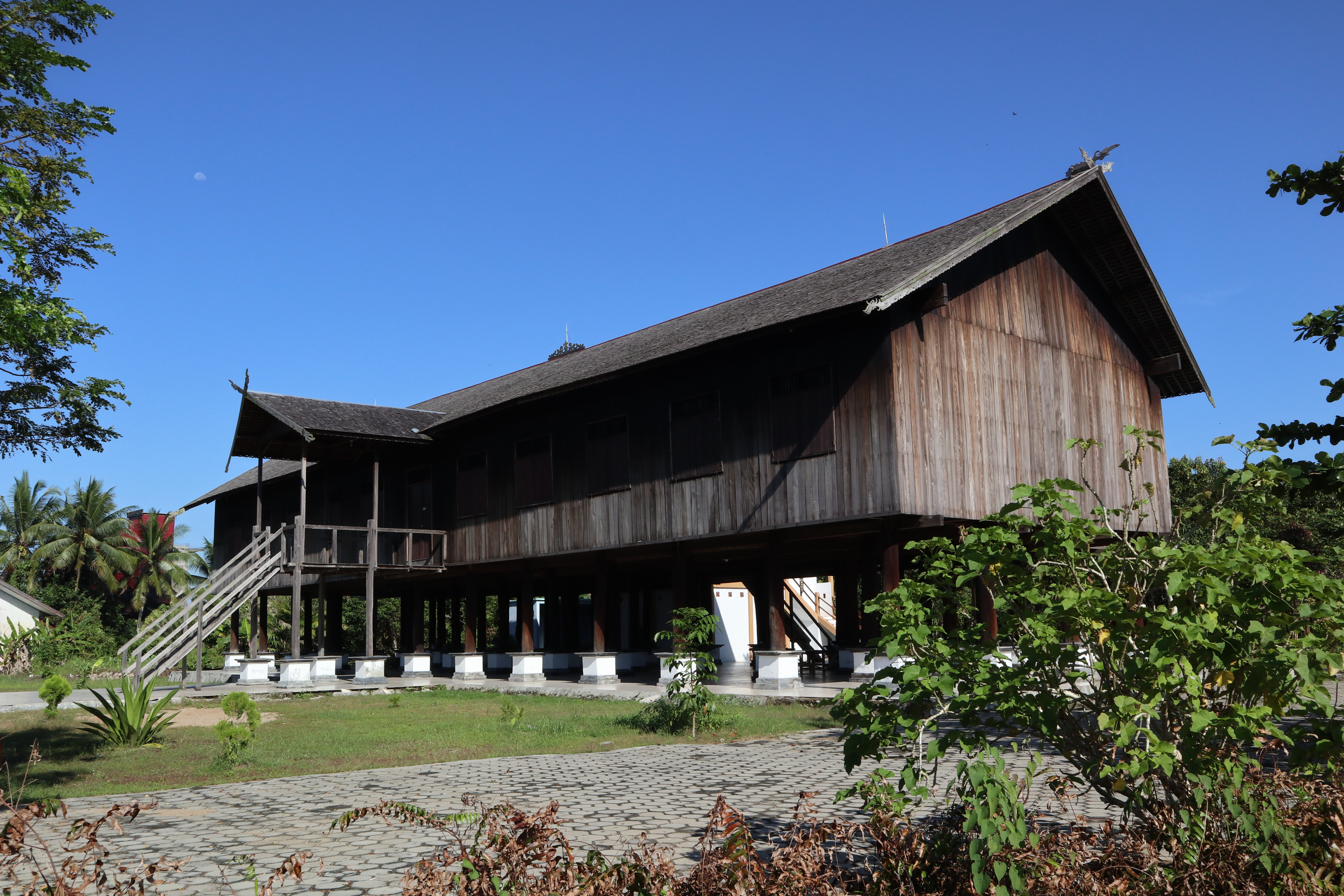
A Huma Betang in Sei Pasah Village, Kapuas Regency, Central Kalimantan

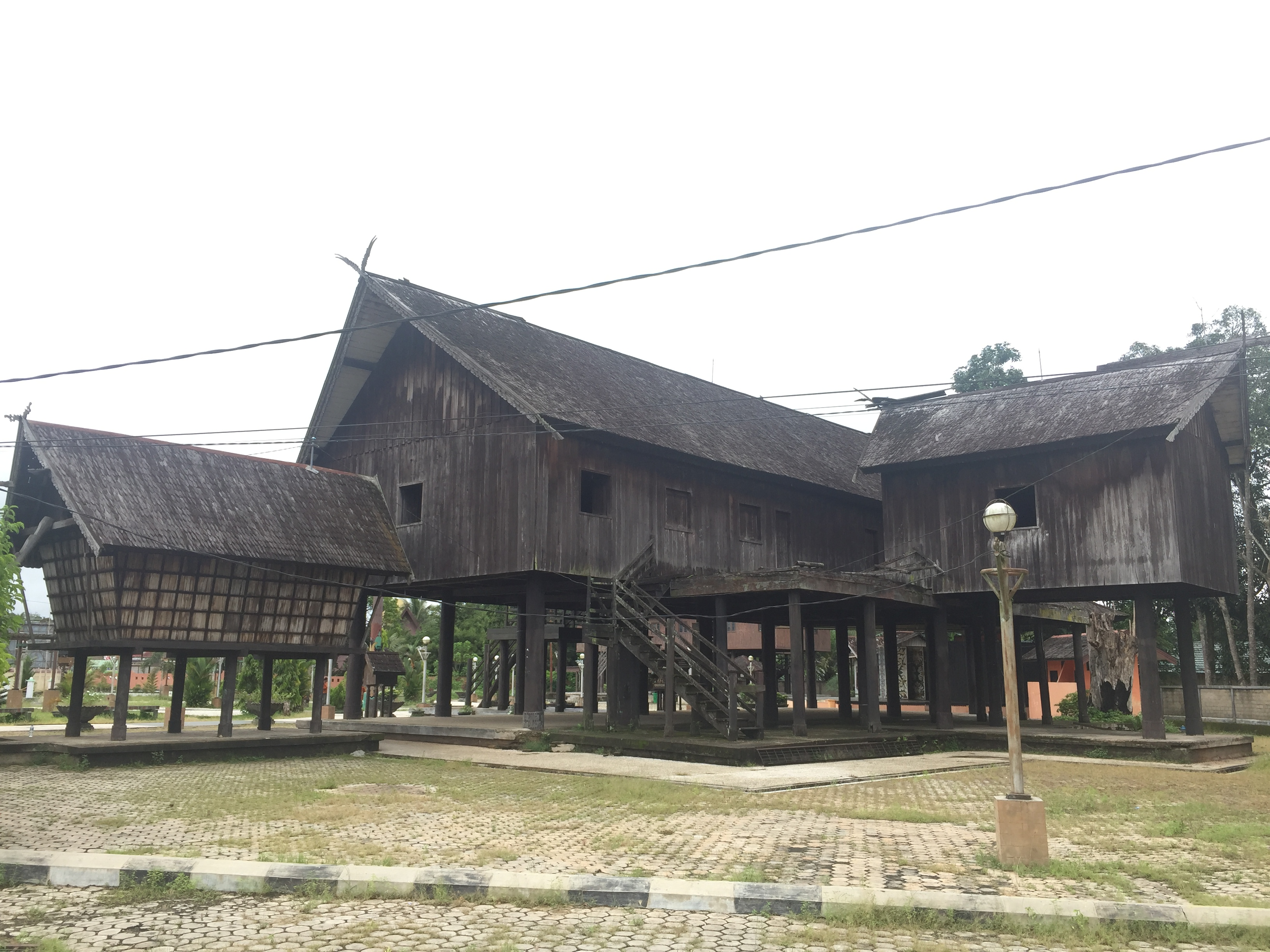
A Huma Betang in Lewu Hante Museum, East Barito, Central Kalimantan

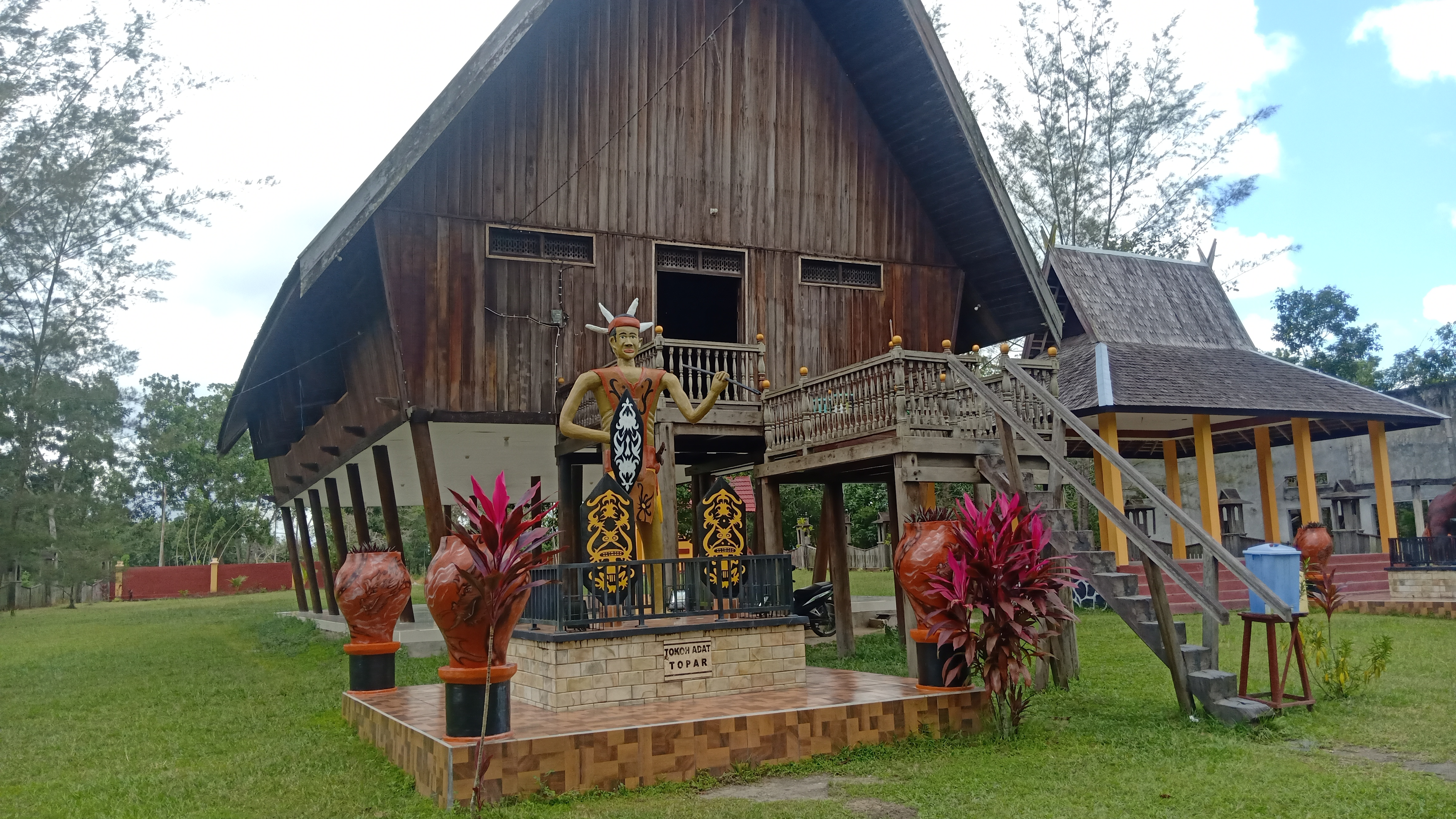
A Huma Betang with Sapundu sculpture at the front of the house in West Kotawaringin, Central Kalimantan

=== Traditional carving ===
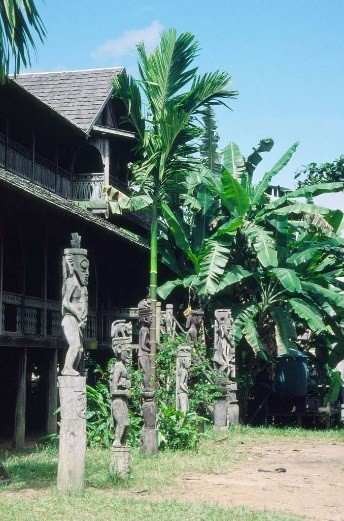
Sapundu Sculptures of Dayak Ngaju in Central Kalimantan

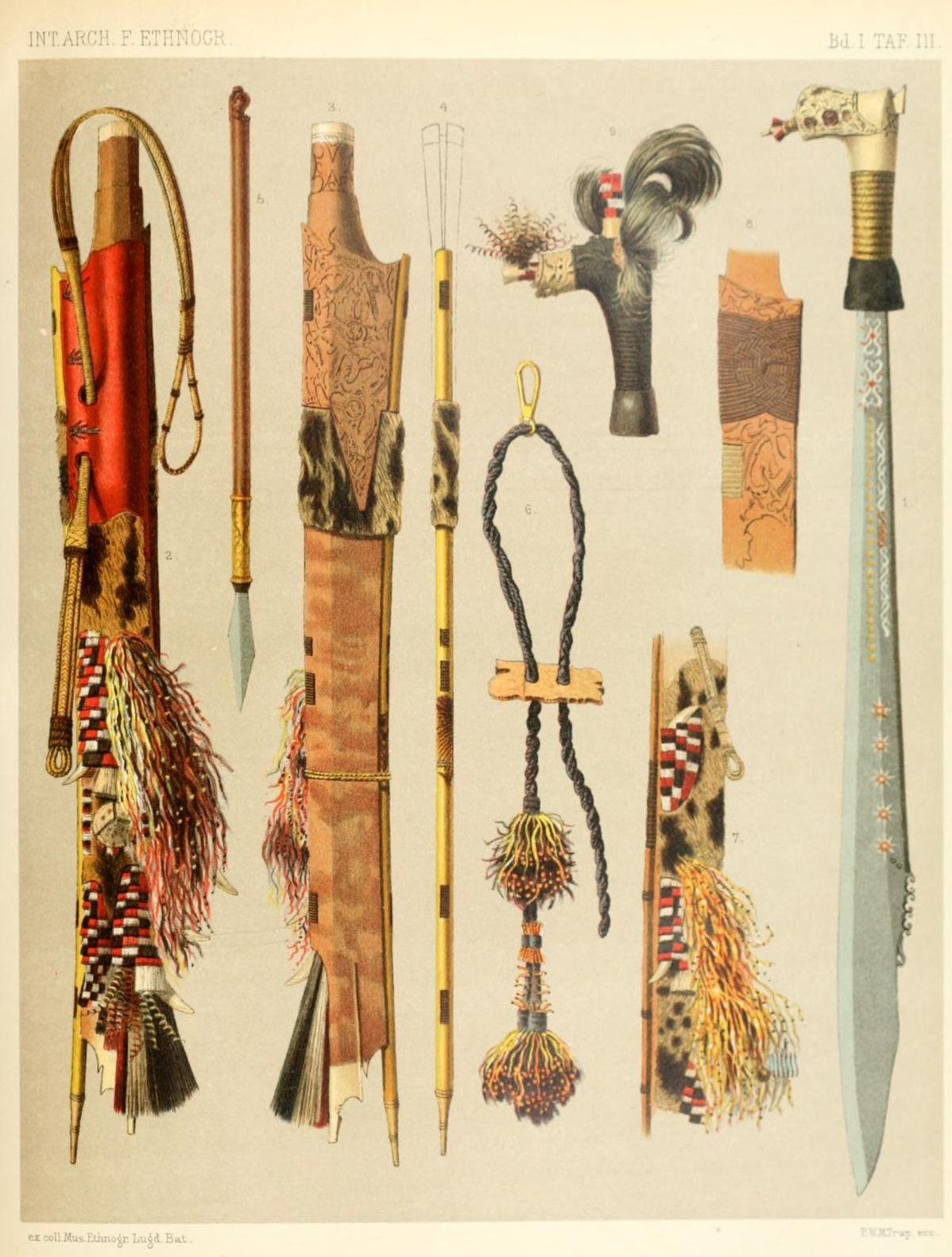
Mandau blade, hilt, scabbard, and other equipments

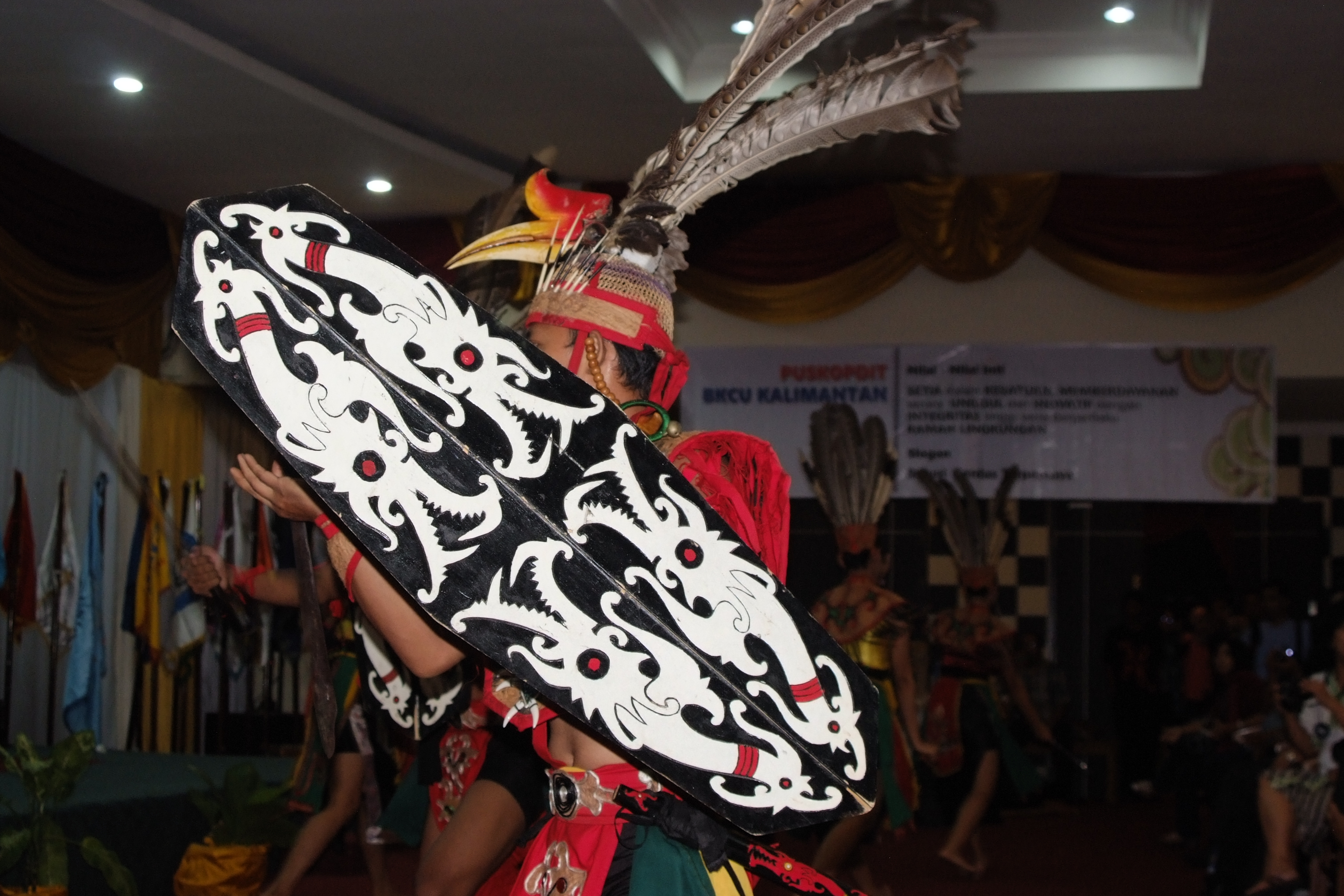
Talawang shield used as a dance instrument

Central Kalimantan is well-known for its unique traditional carving. The three most famous carving from this province are the three dimensional wood carving sculpture of Sapundu and the traditional weapons i.e. Mandau and Talawang.

Sapundu sculpture is a three dimensional wood carving in the form of humanoid statue. This sculpture is commonly adorned with decorative motifs or even colors. Sapundu sculpture is mainly made of Bornean iron wood and usually presents during Tiwah procession. In ancient times, Sapundu sculpture symbolized the social status of its owner and was believed to possess magical powers.

The Mandau and Talawang are the main traditional weapon of Dayak people in Central Kalimantan. The Mandau is a type of sword with a single edge blade i.e. one side is convex and the other side is concave. The Mandau consists of three different parts, which are (i) the Bilah or the blade that made of Mantikei iron plate with a sharp edge and is 70 cm long, (ii) the Pulang Gagang or the hilt that is usually made of wood, deer's horns, or even human bones, and (iii) the Sarung or the sheath which covers the blade and is typically made of wood and usually covered with bracelet-shaped bone on the upper part and wrapped by rattan rope.

The Talawang is a shield that mainly made of Bornean iron wood that is carved with certain motifs and adorned with some bright colors. In ancient times, this weapon was used as a protection against wild animals and enemy's arrows and sword slashes. However, the function currently shifts to become a decorative ornament of Kaharingan temples, public buildings, or even people's houses mostly in Central Kalimantan.

=== Traditional dance ===
Central Kalimantan is home for various sub-ethnics of Dayak tribe. Each of those Dayak sub-ethnics live spread out across all regencies in Central Kalimantan. This makes every regency have their own unique traditional dances. These are some of the traditional dances from Central Kalimantan:

1. Kinyah Mandau Hatue Dance, originating from Kapuas Regency and depicting theatrical war and martial arts of Dayak tribes in ancient time.
2. Giring-Giring Dance, coming from East Barito Regency and usually performed in group of 6 to 10 people.
3. Walian Dadas Dance, originating from South Barito Regency and used to be performed as a way to heal a region from negativity.
4. Babukung Dance, originally from Lamandau Regency and performed during funeral especially among Dayak Tomun people.
5. Tambun Bungai Dance, originating from Palangka Raya city and depicting heroic action of Tambung and Bungai protecting the territory from enemy who tried to loot people's crops.

== See also ==
- Deforestation in Borneo
- Fauna of Borneo
- Heart of Borneo
