= Maʼanyan language =

Austronesian (East Barito) language spoken in central Kalimantan, Indonesia

Maʼanyan
- Pronunciation: [maʔaɲan]
- Native to: Indonesia
- Region: Central Kalimantan and South Kalimantan
- Ethnicity: Ma'anyan
- Native speakers: 150,000 (2003)
- Language family: Austronesian: Malayo-Polynesian; Barito; East Barito; Central–South East Barito; Maʼanyan

Language codes
- ISO 639-3: mhy
- Glottolog: maan1238
- Languages map of Kalimantan, Ma'anyan language in number 32.

Maʼanyan, Maanyan, Maʼanyan Barito, Maanyan Barito, Maʼanyan Dayak, Maanyan Dayak is an Austronesian language belonging to the eastern branch of the Barito language family. According to the 2003 census, it is spoken by about 150,000 Maʼanyan Dayaks – a Dayak ethnic group native to the Central and South Kalimantan, Indonesia. It is closely related to Malagasy, an East Barito dialect continuum spoken in Madagascar, although these languages are not highly mutually intelligible due to centuries-long separation.

== Connection with Malagasy ==
The Malagasy language is an Austronesian language spoken in Madagascar, originating from its historical homeland in Southeast Kalimantan. Malagasy is classified among the Southeast Barito languages, and Maʼanyan is often listed as its closest relative, with Malagasy incorporating numerous Javanese loanwords. It is known that Maʼanyan Dayaks were brought as labourers and slaves by the Javanese people in their trading fleets, which reached Madagascar by c. 50–500 AD. There is high lexical similarity with other East Barito languages like Paku Dayak (77%) and Witu Dusun Dayak (75%). It is likely that the Malagasy had already acquired a separate ethnic and linguistic identity in South Kalimantan prior to their migration(s) to East Africa. Based on linguistic evidence, it has been suggested that the early Malagasy migrants moved away from Kalimantan via Sunda Strait in the 7th century AD, if not later.

Compared to Malagasy, Ma’anyan is characterized by a "West Indonesian" (Hesperonesian) morphosyntactic structure, a consequence of the long-standing influence of Hesperonesian on the languages of Western Indonesia. While Malagasy is closer to the so-called “Philippine-type structure” (resembling many of the languages of the Philippines, Sabah, North Sulawesi, and Taiwan), it is also very innovative phonologically, perhaps as a result of its common phonological history with Comorian languages.

== Phonology ==
=== Consonants ===
		Labial	Alveolar	Palatal	Velar	Glottal
Plosive	voiceless	p	t		k	ʔ
Plosive	voiced	b	d	ɟ	ɡ	
Nasal		m	n	ɲ	ŋ	
Fricative			s			h
Trill			r			
Lateral			l			
Approximant		w		j		

/r/ can also be heard as a tap sound [ɾ].

=== Vowels ===
	Front	Back
Close	i	u
Open	ɛ	a

/i, u/ can be heard as [ɪ, ʊ] in closed syllables.

== Vocabulary ==
Vocabulary comparison between Malay, Banjarese, Ma'anyan, and Malagasy.

Malay	Banjarese	Ma'anyan	Malagasy	English
monyet	warik	warik	varika ('lemur')	monkey
bemban	bamban	waman		basket trap for fish; the plant Donax spp. used to make it
bulian	balian	wadian		shaman, priest
patih	patih	patis		regent
lama	lawas	lawah	lava	long (as in time)
kawan	kawal	kawal/hengau	namana	friend
obat	tatamba	tatamba	tambavy	medicine
senang	aray	aray		happy, easy
masih	magun	pagun		to keep ...ing
arya	aria	uria		
demang	damang	damhong		spider
