= Dusun Witu language =

Austronesian language spoken in Kalimantan, Indonesia

Witu
- Dusun Witu
- Native to: Indonesia
- Region: Kalimantan
- Native speakers: 5,000 (2003)
- Language family: Austronesian: Malayo-Polynesian; East Barito; South; Witu
- Dialects: Dusun Pepas; Dusun Witu

Language codes
- ISO 639-3: duw
- Glottolog: dusu1267

Dusun Witu, or Witu, is a language spoken by the Dusun Witu people of Borneo specifically in Kalimantan Tengah Province, South Barito regency, near Pendang and Buntokecil towns; south of Muarateweh town in Indonesia. It is closely related to the Malagasy language spoken in Madagascar.
