= Celebrity Race Across the World series 3 =

Third series of Celebrity Race Across the World

Celebrity Race Across the World
- Series 3
- Presented by: John Hannah (narrator)
- No. of days: 30
- No. of contestants: 8
- Winners: Roman Kemp & Harleymoon Kemp
- No. of legs: 6
- Distance traveled: 5,900 km (3,700 mi)
- No. of episodes: 6

Release
- Original network: BBC One
- Original release: 6 November – 11 December 2025

Season chronology
- ← Previous; Series 2 Next → Series 4

The third series of Celebrity Race Across the World was a race over 5,900 kilometres (3,700 mi) across Central America, starting in Isla Mujeres, Mexico and finishing in the Península de La Guajira, Colombia. It is the eighth overall series in the UK's Race Across the World franchise, and the third iteration of the celebrity edition.

It was announced by the BBC on 18 September 2025, and began airing on 6 November 2025 in the 8pm time slot on BBC One. The series consisted of six hour-long episodes and starred four pairs of competitors - broadcaster and writer Anita Rani and her dad, Bal; actor Dylan Llewellyn and his mum, Jackie; romantic partners, radio presenter Tyler West and actor and singer Molly Rainford; and broadcaster Roman Kemp and his sister, singer-songwriter Harleymoon.

Start and end points
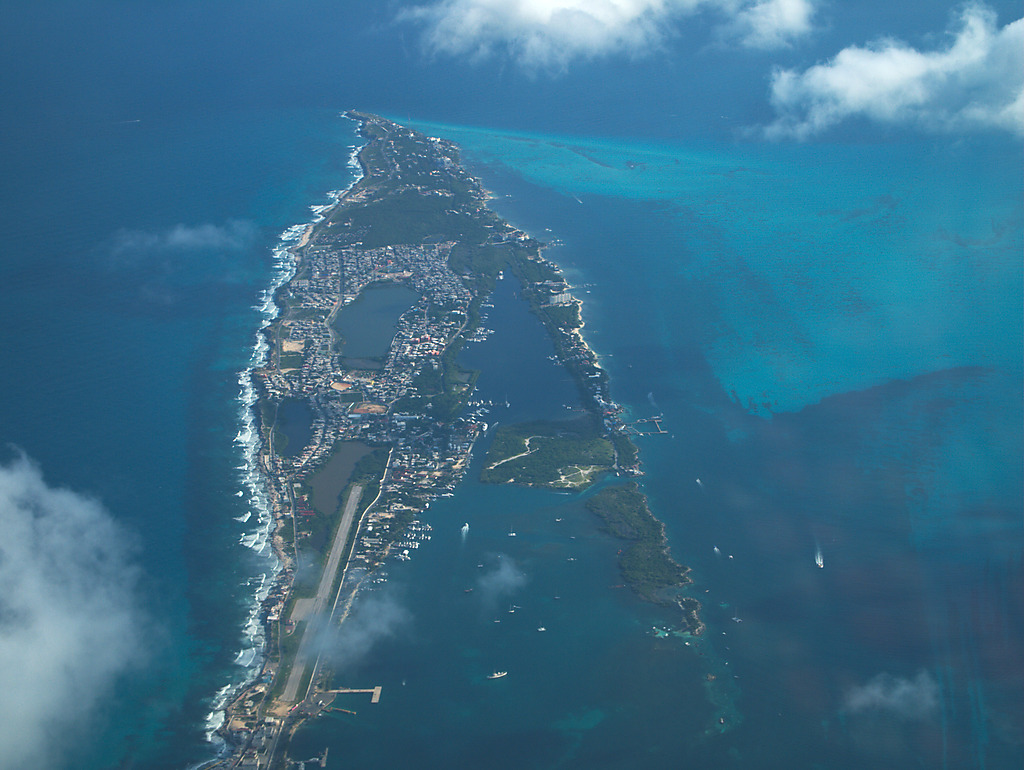
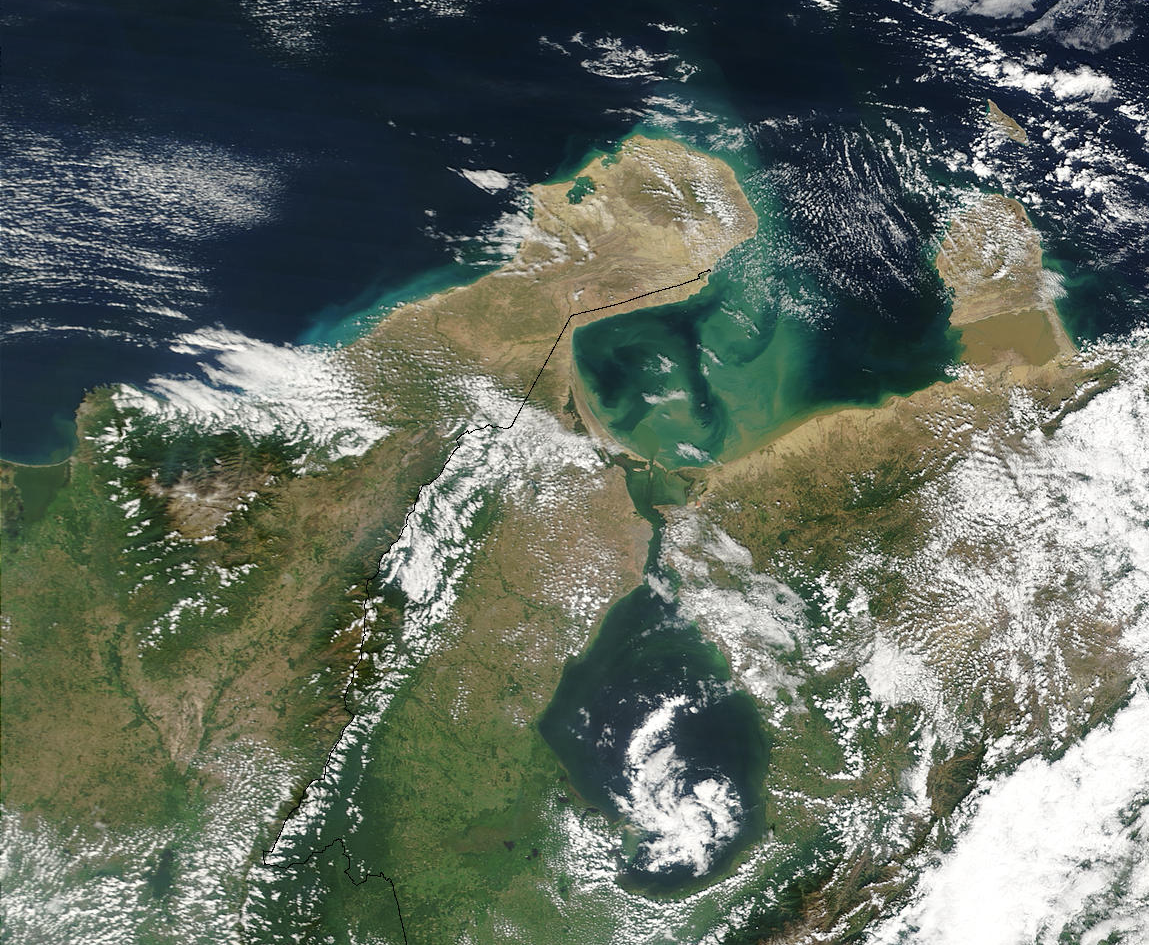
Isla Mujeres, Mexico (top) and Península de La Guajira, Colombia (bottom)

== Background ==
The third celebrity series was announced on 18 September 2025. Of this year's route, series producer Philip McCreery stated, “we’re trying to make an adventure that you could not buy, on a route that will take 32 days, as well as something that takes in different landscapes and cultures – a journey through deserts, to the sea, the jungle. A lot of areas in the world have just one road all the way through, but here, there are many ways you can choose to travel. We have to make sure it’s safe, while also feeling raw and authentic. And we have to make sure it’s a route that has diversity and, while every series has an arc, every episode also has its own identity.” During filming, each team has an embedded video director/producer to monitor their wellbeing and report back to the production teams both on location and in London on their movements. Each pair also has a driver, researcher, multiskilled agent (medic/security), and a "fixer" who speaks the local language to ensure the teams are safe at all times during the race. Producers are not permitted to give clues to the teams or to intervene in their decision-making.

== Overview ==
The race had five checkpoints with enforced rest periods, with contestants only finding out the next destination on departure from a checkpoint. Teams were given a budget of £950 per person – the equivalent air fare for travelling the race route. Contestants were not permitted to subsidise their budgets, but short-term opportunities allowed them to work for money or bed and board. The contestants were not allowed access to telephones or the internet, but were provided with a map, travel guide, directory of local jobs, and GPS tracker.

== Contestants ==
The full line-up of contestants was announced throughout the day on 18 September 2025 across various BBC programmes: Llewellyn on series two winner Scott Mills' Radio 2 show, Rani on Radio 4's Woman's Hour, West and Rainford on West's Kiss FM show, and Kemp on The One Show, which he co-hosts.

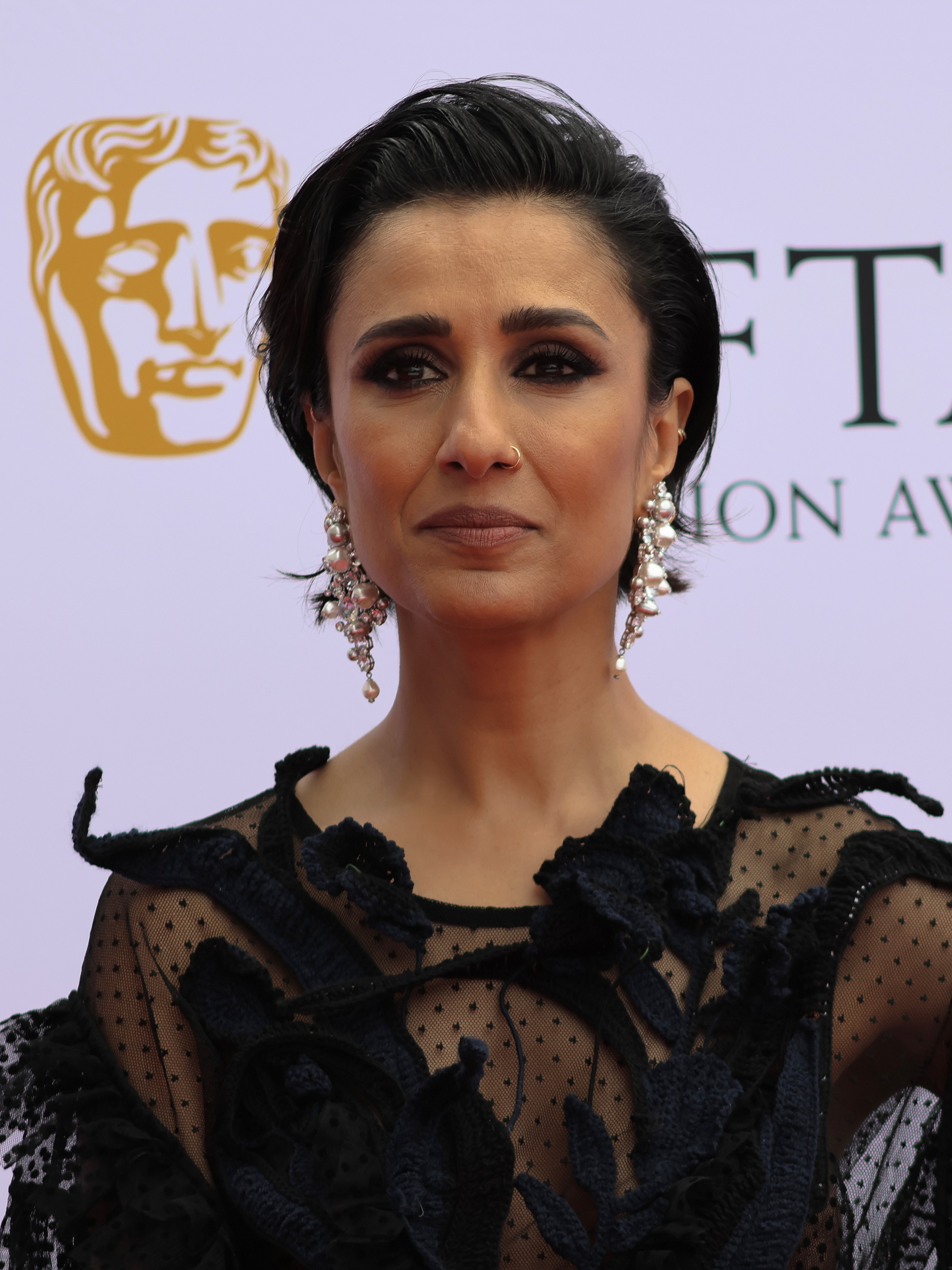
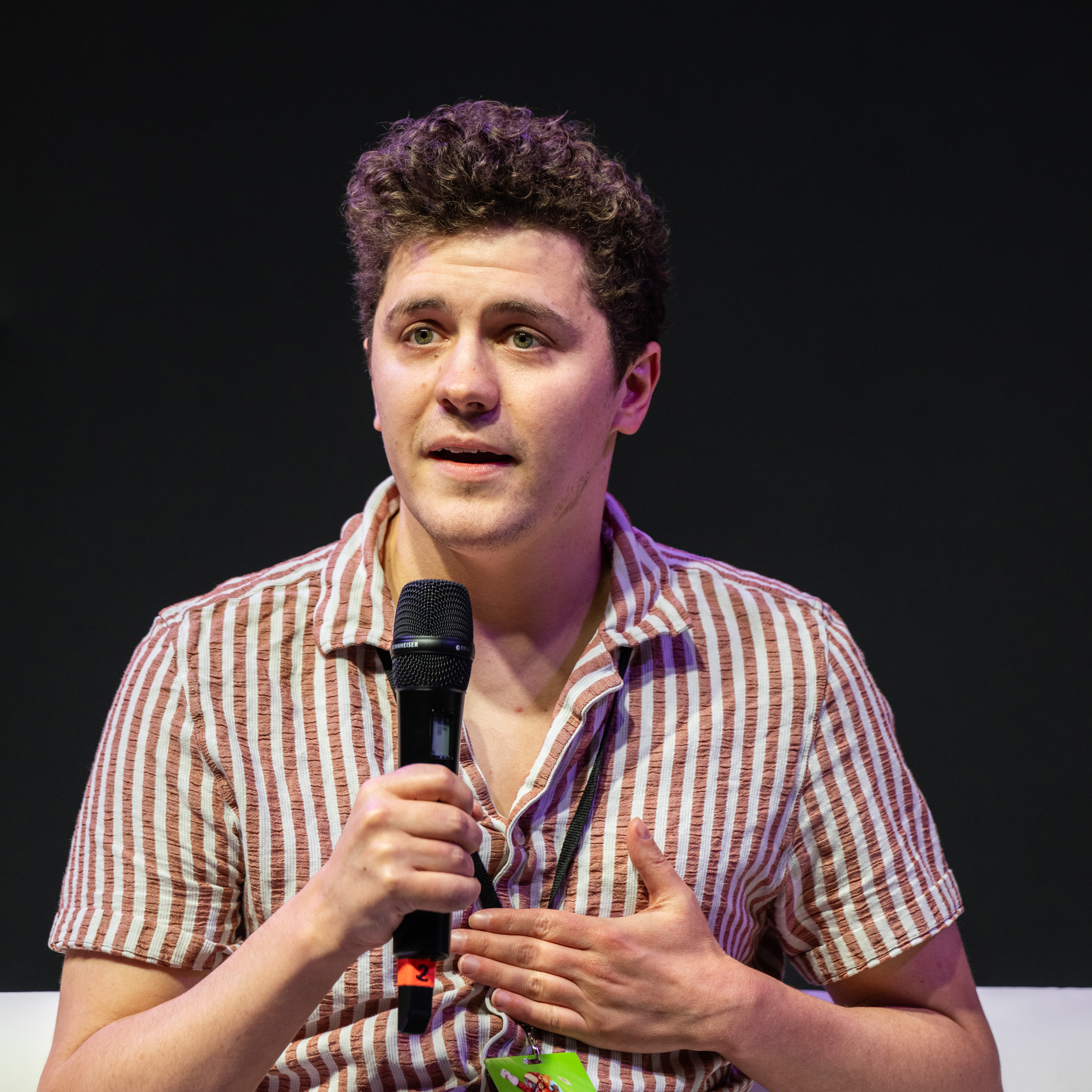
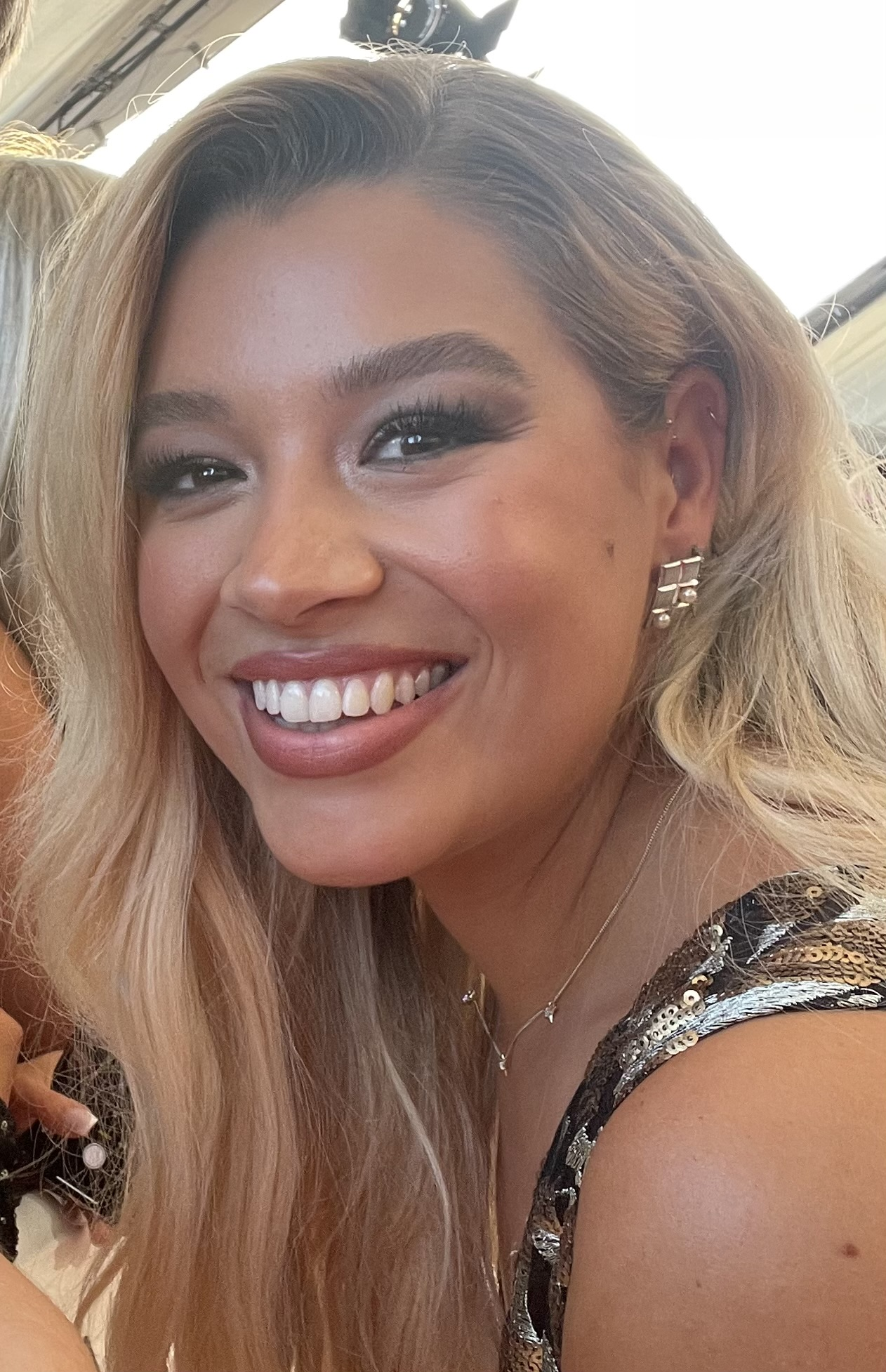
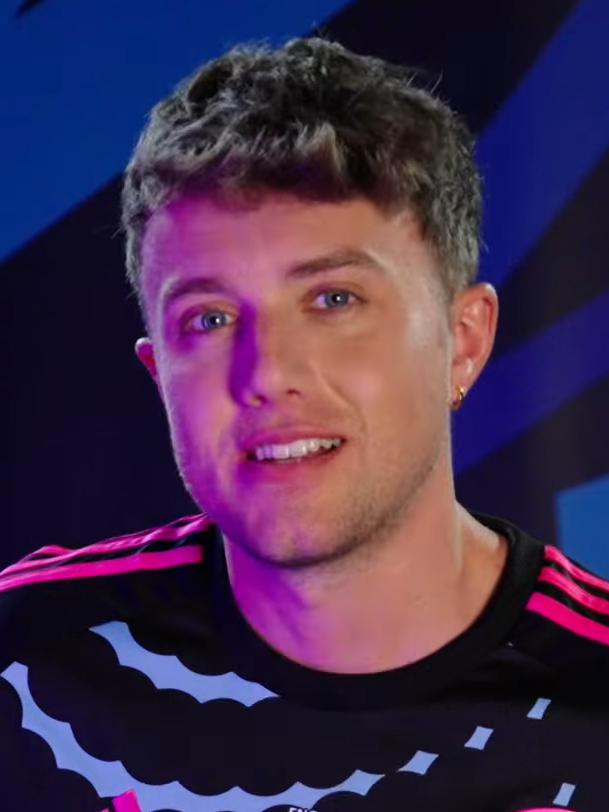
From left to right: Anita Rani, Dylan Llewellyn, Molly Rainford, and Roman Kemp.
Not pictured: Bal Nazran, Jackie Llewellyn, Tyler West, and Harley Moon Kemp.

Name	Relationship	Occupation	Age
Anita Rani	Daughter and Father	Broadcaster and writer	47
Balvinder "Bal" Singh Nazran	Daughter and Father	Semi-retired businessman	68
Dylan Llewellyn	Son and Mother	Actor	32
Jackie Llewellyn	Son and Mother	Retired	59
Tyler West	Partners	Broadcaster and DJ	28
Molly Rainford	Partners	Actress and singer	24
Roman Kemp	Brother and Sister	Presenter	32
Harleymoon Kemp	Brother and Sister	Singer-songwriter	36

== Results summary ==
Colour key:

– Team withdrawn
– Series winners

Teams	Position (by leg)					
Teams	1	2	3	4	5	6
Roman & Harleymoon	2nd	2nd	4th	2nd	2nd	Winners
Tyler & Molly	3rd	3rd	1st	4th	1st	2nd
Anita & Bal	1st	1st	2nd	3rd	3rd	3rd
Dylan & Jackie	4th	4th	3rd	1st	4th	DNF

== Route ==
The checkpoints in the third celebrity series were:

Leg	From	To
1	Half Moon Beach; Isla Mujeres, Mexico	Las Luciernagas Hotel; Flores, Petén, Guatemala
2	Las Luciernagas Hotel; Flores, Petén, Guatemala	Garten Hotel; El Zonte, El Salvador
3	Garten Hotel; El Zonte, El Salvador	Boutique Hotel La Casona; Valle de Ángeles, Honduras
4	Guanacaste Airport; Liberia, Costa Rica	Red Frog Beach Island Resort; Bocas del Toro, Panama
5	Red Frog Beach Island Resort; Bocas del Toro, Panama	The Click Clack Hotel; Medellín, Colombia
6	The Click Clack Hotel; Medellín, Colombia	Headland near Cabo de la Vela; Península de La Guajira, Colombia

Checkpoints on Series 3: Checkpoint, Start, Resume
Checkpoints on Series 3: Checkpoint, Finish

== Race summary ==
Mode of transportation	Rail Ferry/Boat Bus/coach Taxi Road vehicle Self-drive vehicle (paid) RV Aeroplane Boat
Activity	Working for money and/or bed and board Excursion that cost time and/or money

=== Leg 1: Isla Mujeres, Mexico → Flores, Petén, Guatemala ===
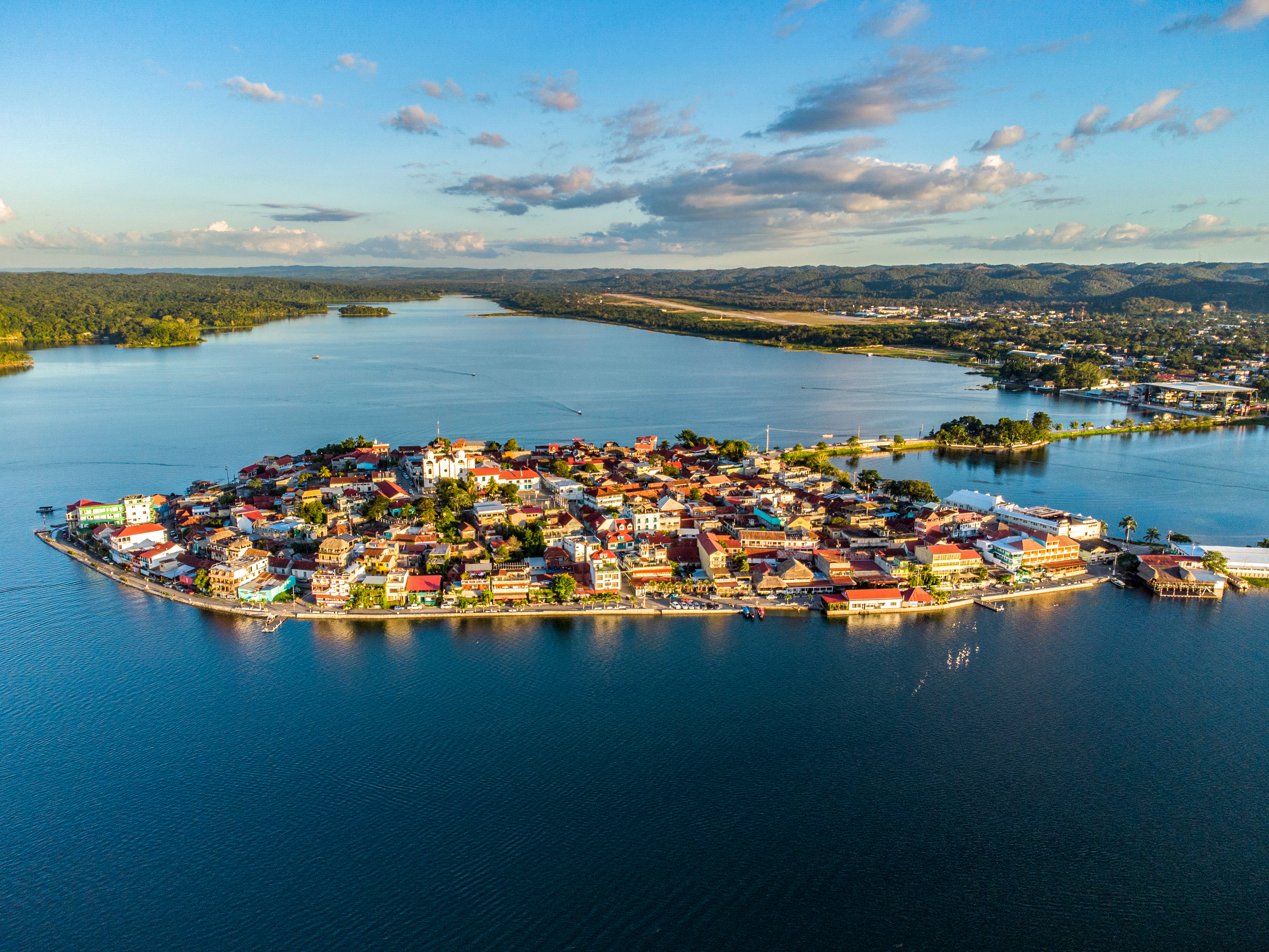
Flores, Guatemala

The four teams arrive on the Isla Mujeres by boat to hand over their mobile phones, cash, and bank cards, and to collect their race essentials. The final destination of Guajira Peninsula, the northernmost point of the South American continent, was revealed, as was the first checkpoint, Flores, Petén in Guatemala, over 1,100 kilometres (680 mi) away. The race began at 3pm from Half Moon Beach on Isla Mujeres on the shoreline of the Great Maya Reef.

The teams manage to locate the only port to make it off the island and take the ferry to mainland Cancún. They must then decide which route to take to the checkpoint - the most direct route through Belize, which will mean going through two border crossings, or remaining in Mexico and taking a longer route to the Guatemalan border. Anita and Bal opt to go through Belize so that they can visit the Maya ruins. They find an overnight bus which takes them straight to Chetumal, the closest city to the Belizean border crossing. Also desiring to save on accommodation costs, Tyler and Molly get an overnight bus 490 kilometres (300 mi) to Campeche. Roman and Harley Moon, undecided on which route to take, travel 200km to Valladolid in order to get out of the expensive Cancún and keep their options open. Dylan and Jackie decide to remain in Cancún.

Two team elect to work for free bed and board, with Tyler and Molly harvest chilli peppers at the Hacienda San Diego Chavi, and Roman and Harley Moon mucking out horse stables at Charros de Rosarito Ranch. The latter team take local advice and decide to go through Belize to the checkpoint, following in Anita and Bal's footsteps by getting a bus to Chetumal and then cross the border to Santa Elena. Growing concerned about falling behind, Dylan and Jackie opt for a costly train from Cancún to Mérida and experience the local music scene there, and then take a second train to Escárcega. Entering Belize, Anita and Bal travel up the New River and visit the Jaguar Temple at the Lamanai archaeological site before hitchhiking to Belize City and taking a bus to the border town of San Ignacio.

Roman and Harley Moon manage to find a bus direct from Santa Elena to Flores, covering a total of 360 kilometres (220 mi), but it breaks down in Belize City, hampering their progress. They eventually get back on the road, making it to Melchor de Mencos in the Petén Department and then hitchhiking to Flores. Tyler and Molly cross the border into Guatemala and choose to have an extra three hours of sleep in El Naranjo before catching a bus to Flores. Dylan and Jackie travel by high speed train to Tenosique.

Once in Flores, the team are tasked with using local landmarks (Parque Concordia and Catedral de Nuestra Señora de Los Remedios) to navigate to the checkpoint at the Las Luciernagas Hotel, which is only accessible by boat. Anita and Bal reach the checkpoint first at around midday of day 4. Roman and Harley Moon arrive 23hrs later, followed by Tyler and Molly who, hampered by their lie-in, arrive around an hour and a half later. Dylan and Jackie finish in last place.

Order	Teams	Route	Hours behind leaders	Money left
1	Anita & Bal	Isla Mujeres → Cancún → Chetumal → Lamanai → Belize City → San Ignacio → Flores	—N/a	78%
2	Roman & Harley Moon	Isla Mujeres → Cancún → Valladolid → Santa Elena → Melchor de Mencos → Flores	23 hours 16 minutes	86%
3	Tyler & Molly	Isla Mujeres → Cancún → Cempeche → Emiliano Zapata → El Earanjo → Flores	24 hours 56 minutes	83%
4	Dylan & Jackie	Isla Mujeres → Cancún → Mérida → Escárcega → Tenosique → Flores	29 hours 36 minutes	74%

=== Leg 2: Flores, Petén, Guatemala → El Zonte, El Salvador ===
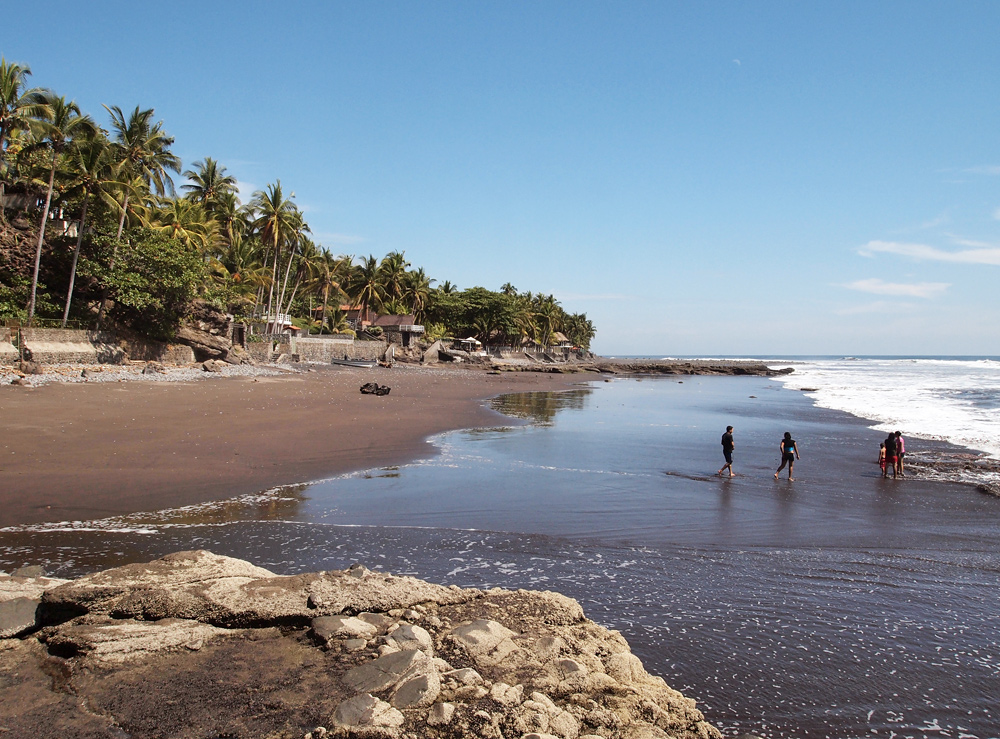
El Zonte, El Salvador

The race recommenced on day 6 (for Anita and Bal) and day 7 (for the other teams), with the second checkpoint being revealed as El Zonte, a town in the La Libertad Department of El Salvador that is 940 kilometres (580 mi) to the south of Flores. For safety reasons, the teams were instructed that they were not allowed to travel after dark during this leg due to an increase in trafficking and crime during the night. Each pair must decide whether to travel through the mountainous heartland of Guatemala, explore the Caribbean coasts of southern Belize, or navigate through Honduras.

Two teams, Anita and Bal, and Roman and Harley Moon) choose to remain in Guatemala, aiming to reach Cobán by bus, but their progress is halted by protests over the government's plan to implement compulsory car insurance laws, causing the blockage of all roads. Roman and Harley Moon travel through the Punta de Chimino, working at the island's nature lodge for bed and board before staying in Sayaxché, while Anita and Bal are forced to stay in San Agustín Lanquín until the protests end. Dylan and Jackie manage to unknowingly avoid the blockades by for Honduras, passing through the border town of Morales and working as cacao farmers to replenish their cash reserves. Tyler and Molly, hoping to connect to their Caribbean heritage, opt to travel along the coast to Hopkins in Belize and work at Ella's Coolspot, a local restaurant, before getting ferry across the Caribbean Sea to Honduras.

When the protests subside, Roman and Harley Moon continue to head to Cobán, while Anita and Bal travel 290 kilometres (180 mi) west to Quetzaltenango in order to avoid the still-congested Guatemala City, spending big on a taxi to try and make up for lost time, then working at a bar to compensate. Running into more road issues, Roman and Harley Moon are forced to continue on foot. Molly and Tyler take the boat from Placencia to Puerto Cortés and then eventually make it to the village of Quezailica in Honduras, while Dylan and Jackie also arrive in Quezailica, and work for a local family of tobacco farmers in exchange for bed and board at their home.

Tyler and Molly take the bus to Ocotepeque and cross the border into El Salvador, while Anita and Bal cross the border from the west via Guatemala City once the road are all clear of the protests. In Antigua, Roman and Harley Moon are forced to pay for a costly hostel, having arrived during busy their tourism season. Having overspent on food during the leg, Tyler and Molly make their way to the border on foot. Once in El Zonte, the teams are given directions in order to locate the second checkpoint, a hotel just off the Playa El Zonte. Once again, Anita and Bal arrive first, reaching the checkpoint just before 2pm on day 11, with the other three teams all arriving within four hours. Roman and Harley Moon came second, followed by Tyler and Molly, with Dylan and Jackie in fourth place only four minutes behind them.

Order	Teams	Route	Hours behind leaders	Money left
1	Anita & Bal	Flores → San Agustín Lanquín → Quetzaltenango → Cuilapa → El Zonte	—N/a	63%
2	Roman & Harley Moon	Flores → Punta de Chimino → Antigua → El Zonte	3 hours 35 minutes	77%
3	Tyler & Molly	Flores → Hopkins → Quezailica → Ocotepeque → El Zonte	3 hours 53 minutes	63%
4	Dylan & Jackie	Flores → Morales → Quezailica → El Zonte	3 hours 57 minutes	66%

=== Leg 3: El Zonte, El Salvador → Valle de Ángeles, Honduras ===
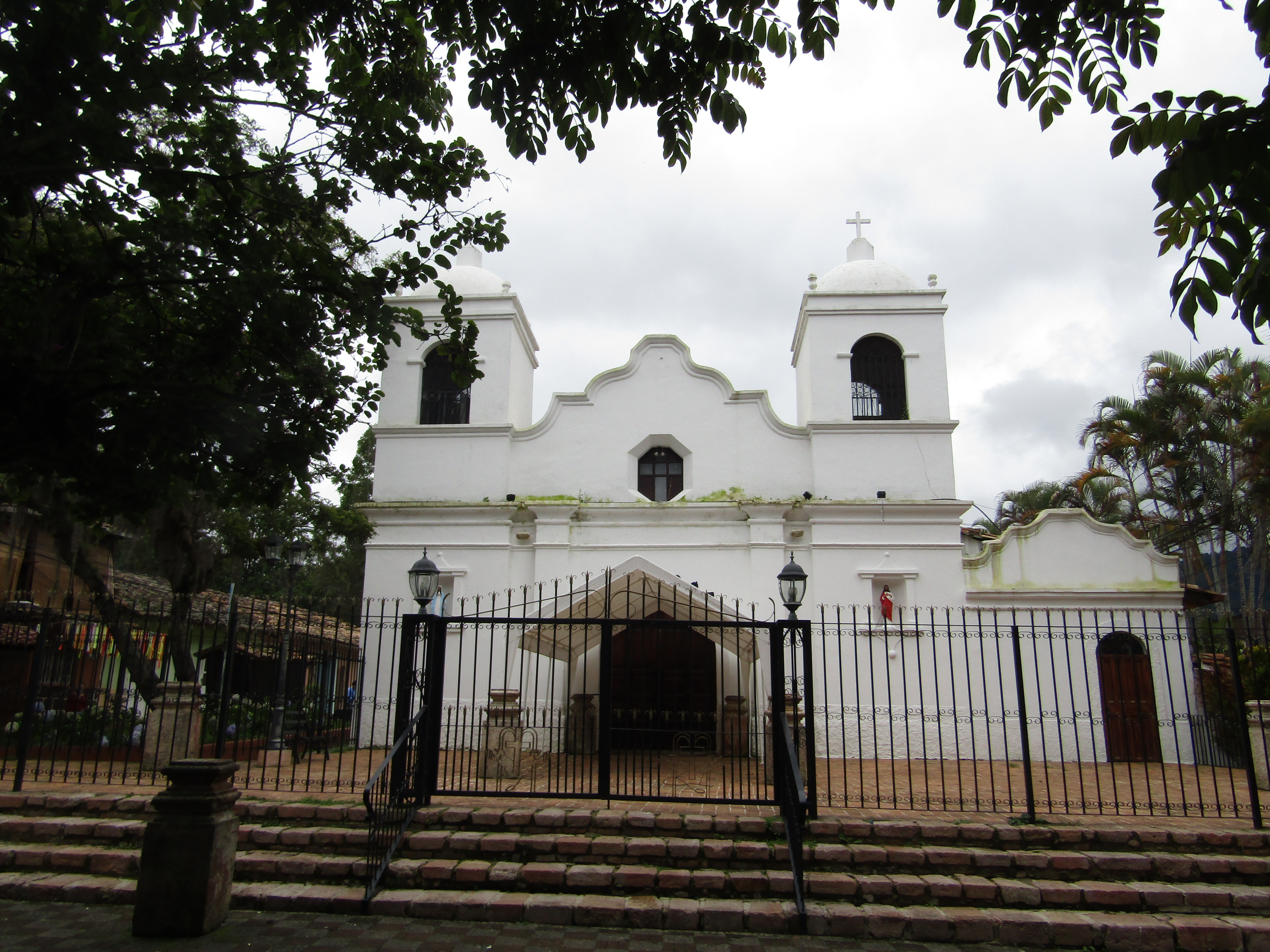
Valle de Ángeles, Honduras

Three teams chose to travel via the land border between El Salvador and Honduras at El Amatillo, in fact they all arrived at the border at the same time and got the same bus eastwards, whilst only one team (Roman and Harley Moon) used the water crossing via La Unión.

Order	Teams	Route	Hours behind leaders	Money left
1	Molly & Tyler	El Zonte → Zaragoza → San Salvador → Lago Ilopango → San Miguel → El Amatillo → Nacaome → Valle de Ángeles	—N/a	
2	Anita & Bal	El Zonte → San Salvador → San Miguel → Conchagua Volcano → El Amatillo → Jicaro Galan → Nacaome → Valle de Ángeles	7 minutes	
3	Dylan & Jackie	El Zonte → San Salvador → Suchitoto → San Miguel → El Amatillo → Nacaome → Valle de Ángeles	8 minutes	
4	Roman & Harley Moon	El Zonte → El Tunco → San Salvador → San Miguel → La Unión → Tiger Island → Coyolito → Valle de Ángeles	7 hours 6 minutes	

=== Leg 4: Liberia, Costa Rica → Bocas del Toro, Panama ===
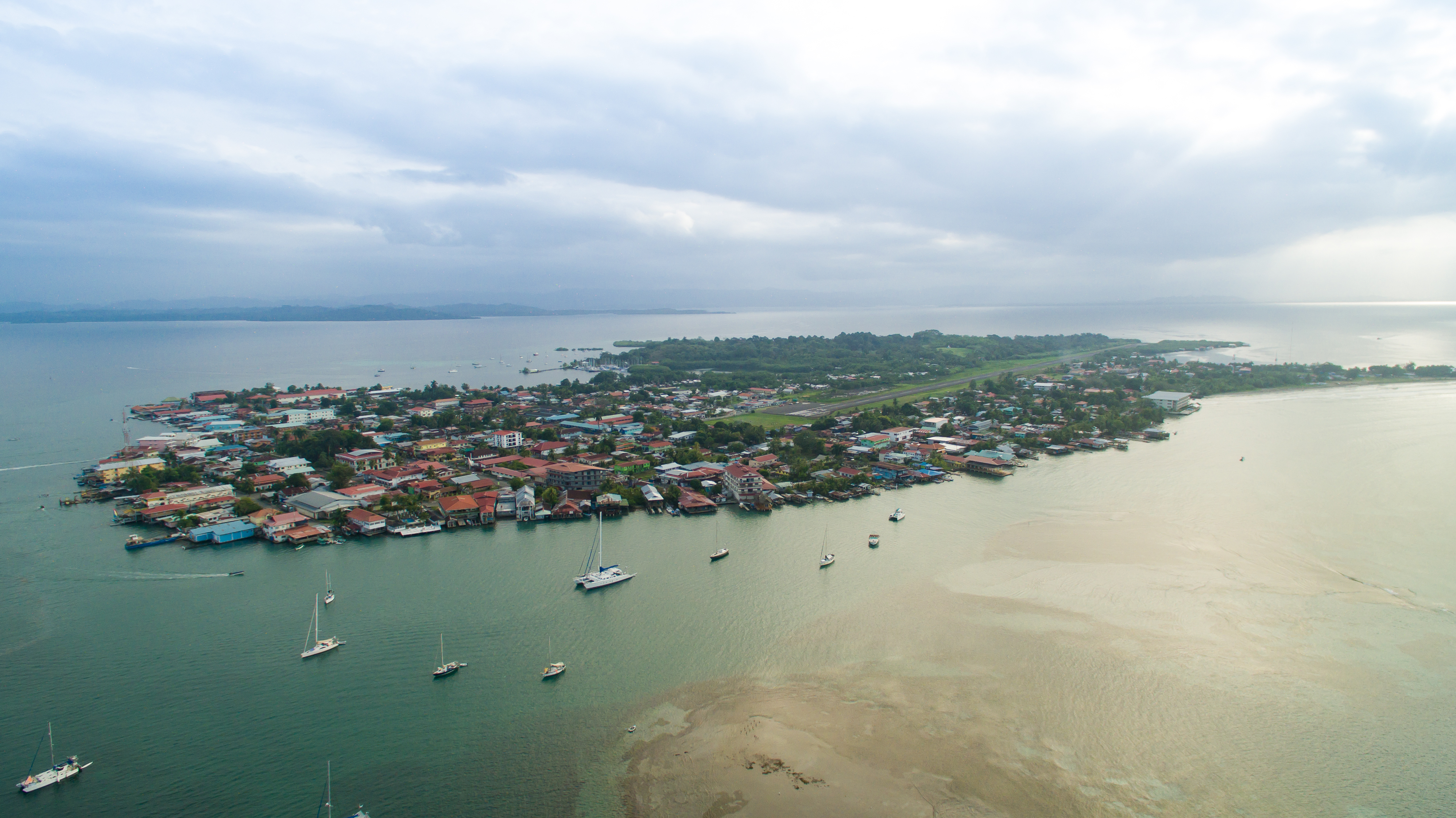
Bocas del Toro, Panama

As permission to film in Nicaragua was denied, the teams were flown to Guanacaste Airport in Liberia, Costa Rica, where the race resumed. From there, Molly & Tyler opted to travel along the Pacific coast, picking up work in Puerto Jiménez and crossing the Panamanian border in the south, whilst all other teams travelled via Limón and the Sixaola border crossing: Anita & Bal travelled through the highlands, working at an eco-resort in El Castillo; Roman & Harley Moon travelled through Tamarindo and San José, picking up work in each of these locations so that they could spend on taxis; and Dylan & Jackie opted to head through San José and Tortuguero, getting an expensive but fast boat option from Tortuguero to Limón to place themselves ahead of the other teams.

Order	Teams	Route	Hours behind leaders	Money left
1	Dylan & Jackie	Liberia → San José → La Pavona → Tortuguero → Limón → Cahuita → Sixaola → Almirante → Bocas del Toro	—N/a	40%
2	Roman & Harley Moon	Liberia → Tamarindo → San José → Limón → Puerto Viejo de Talamanca → Sixaola → Almirante → Bocas del Toro	31 minutes	51%
3	Anita & Bal	Liberia → Cañas → Tilarán → El Castillo → Guápiles → Limón → Sixaola → Almirante → Bocas del Toro	43 minutes	47%
4	Molly & Tyler	Liberia → Jacó → Puerto Jiménez → Golfito → Bocas del Toro	6 hours 52 minutes	46%

=== Leg 5: Bocas del Toro, Panama → Medellín, Colombia ===
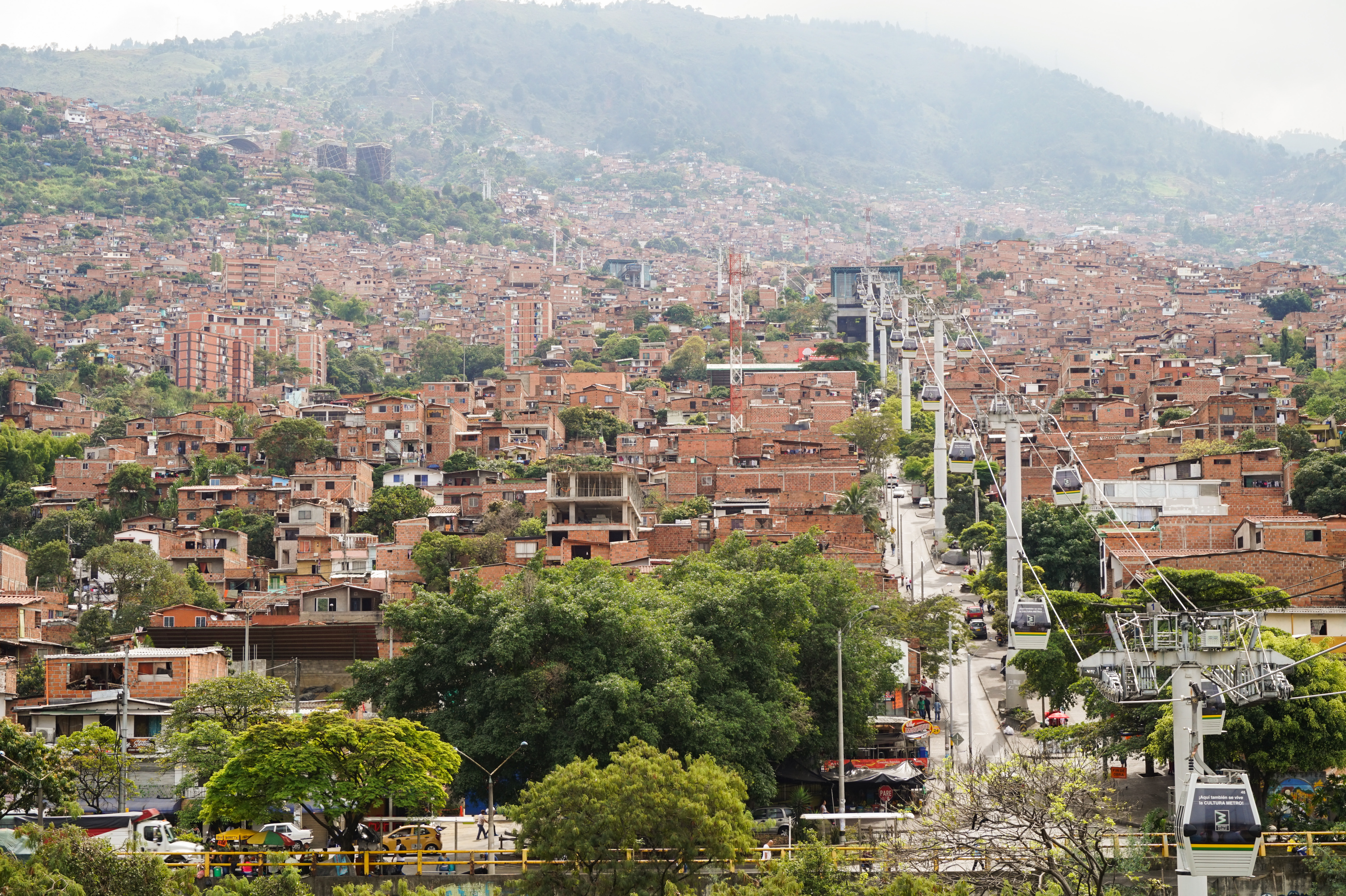
Medellín, Colombia

All teams had to travel to Panama City, then get a 4×4 transfer to the port at Puerto Tupile Dibin, Cartí, Panama, travel by sea through Guna Yala to Capurganá, Colombia and then take a boat to Turbo. Upon arrival in Turbo, all teams received a notification on their GPS trackers that due to reports of armed attacks in the Antioquia Department, they would be driven to Betancur Airport and flown directly to Medellín.

Order	Teams	Route	Hours behind leaders	Money left
1	Molly & Tyler	Bocas del Toro → Almirante → Panama City → Cartí → Isla de Pinos → Capurganá → Turbo → Betancur Airport → Medellín	—N/a	20%
2	Roman & Harley Moon	Bocas del Toro → Almirante → David → Panama City → Cartí → Mandungua → Capurganá → Turbo → Betancur Airport → Medellín	1 hour 50 minutes	25%
3	Anita & Bal	Bocas del Toro → Almirante → Boca Chica → Panama City → Cartí → Capurganá → Turbo → Medellín	18 hours 17 minutes	23%
4	Dylan & Jackie	Bocas del Toro → Almirante → Boquete → Panama City → Cartí → Narganá → Medellín	18 hours 34 minutes	10%

=== Leg 6: Medellín, Colombia → Península de La Guajira, Colombia ===
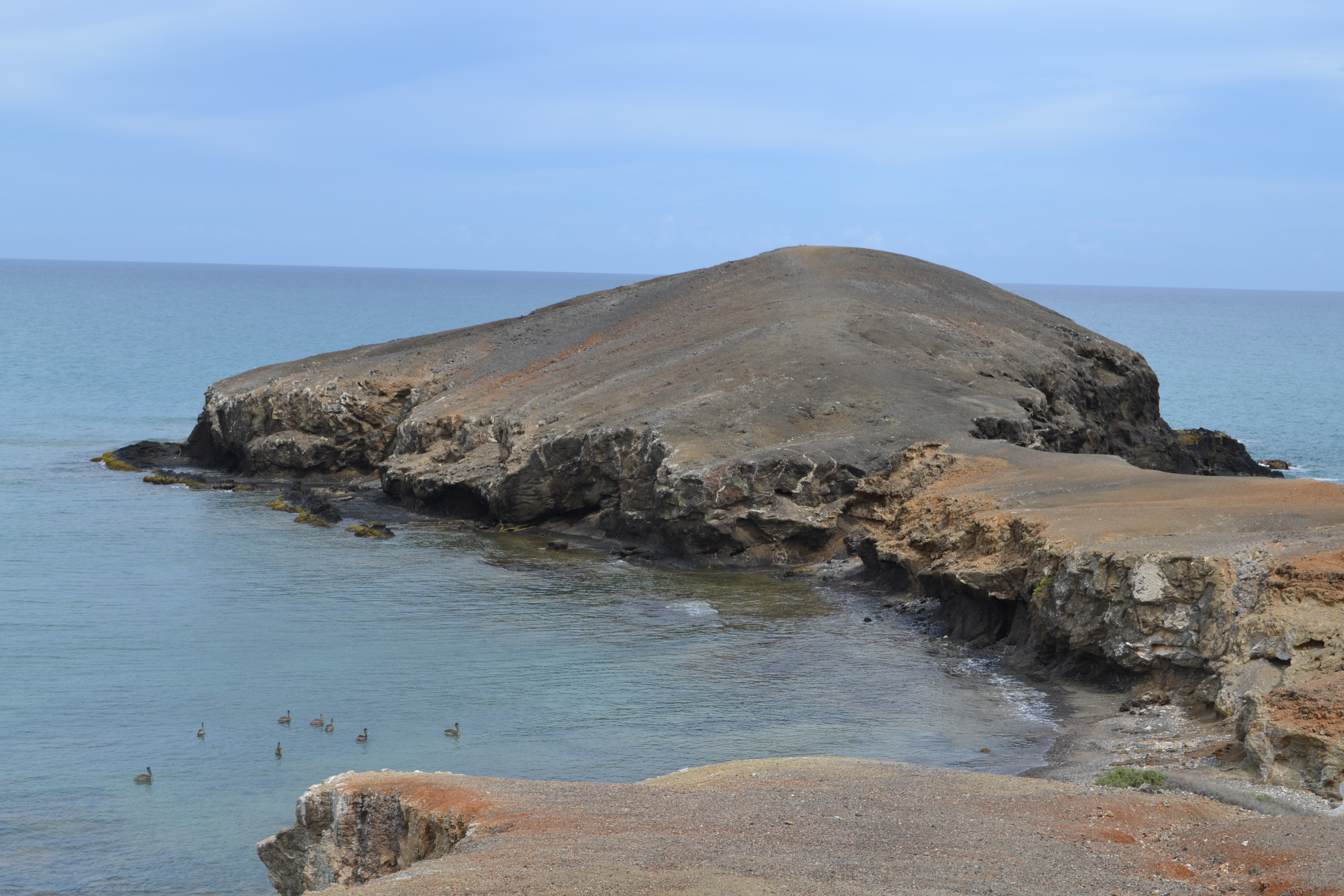
Mirador de la tortuga near Cabo de la Vela

In the final leg, Dylan and Jackie decided to leave the race "on their own terms" after finding that they had too little money left to complete the race. Molly & Tyler chose to take an overnight bus to Cartagena and the coastal route. Roman & Harley Moon also decoded on a coastal route, but took the bus further along coast to Barranquilla but found that they could continued on the same bus further along the coast to Santa Marta. From Santa Marta they travelled to Palomino. Anita & Bal chose an inland route to Bucaramanga.

After an day's rest in Cartagena, Molly & Tyler took a bus to Riohacha. Roman & Harley Moon, who was ahead, also caught a bus to Riohacha, but could not travel further to Uribia by taxi as it was unsafe to travel at night, thereby losing their lead. Anita & Bal found that there were no bus tickets available that day to Maicao near Uribia, and had to take a detour to Santa Marta, and from there they quickly got on a bus to Riohacha.

Both Molly & Tyler and Roman and Harley Moon travelled to Uribia by taxi at the same time and became involved in a race. They travelled through the La Guajira Desert in four-by-fours to Cabo de la Vela in the Guajira Peninsula. This is followed by a five kilometer race by boat and by foot to the finishing line at Mirador de la tortuga, a headland near the lighthouse. Roman and Harley Moon arrived at the final checkpoint just metres ahead of Molly and Tyler, and narrowly beating them in a foot race.

Order	Teams	Route	Time behind leaders	Money left
1	Roman & Harley Moon	Medellín → Barranquilla → Santa Marta → → Palomino → Riohacha → Uribia → Cabo de la Vela → Mirador de la tortuga	—N/a	11% (£200.44)
2	Molly & Tyler	Medellín → Cartagena → Riohacha → Uribia → Cabo de la Vela → Mirador de la tortuga	2 minutes	1% (£17.79)
3	Anita & Bal	Medellín → Bucaramanga → Uribia → Santa Marta → Riohacha → Uribia → Cabo de la Vela → Mirador de la tortuga	5 hours 45 minutes	10% (£197.13)
4	Dylan & Jackie		WD	

== Ratings ==
Episode no.	Airdate	7 days		28 days	
Episode no.	Airdate	Total viewers (millions)	Ranking (all channels)	Total viewers (millions)	Ranking (all channels)
1	6 November 2025	6.74	5	7.92	2
2	13 November 2025	5.75	4	6.80	4
3	20 November 2025	5.38	10	6.61	10
4	27 November 2025	5.35	11	6.52	10
5	4 December 2025	5.36	10	6.22	10
6	11 December 2025	5.77	3	6.25	5
