= Celebrity Race Across the World series 4 =

Fourth series of Celebrity Race Across the World

Celebrity Race Across the World
- Series 4
- Presented by: John Hannah (narrator)
- No. of days: 30
- No. of contestants: 8
- No. of legs: 6
- Distance traveled: 7,500 km (4,700 mi)
- No. of episodes: 6

Release
- Original network: BBC One
- Original release: 28 October 2026 – present

Season chronology
- ← Previous; Series 3 Next → Series 5

The fourth series of Celebrity Race Across the World features a race covering a distance of 7,500 kilometres (4,700 mi), starting in Kuching, Malaysia and finishing in Melbourne, Australia. It started airing on 28 October 2026 in the 8pm time slot on BBC One.

The series consists of six hour-long episodes and stars four pairs of competitors – singer-songwriter Ella Eyre and her childhood friend, Nana; television sports presenter Jeff Stelling and his son Matt; Princess Andre and her brother, Junior Andre; and singer Sam Ryder and his friend Kaz.

Start and end points
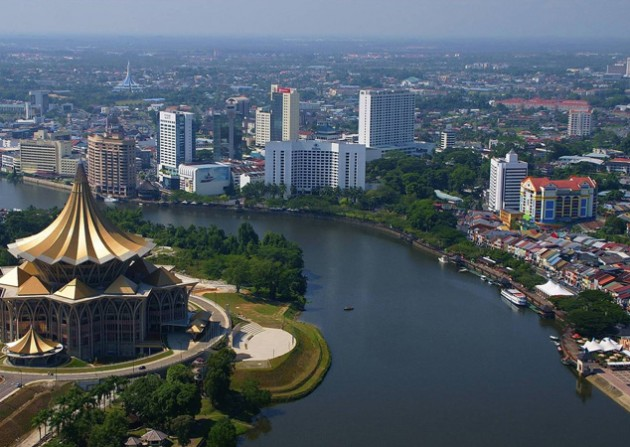
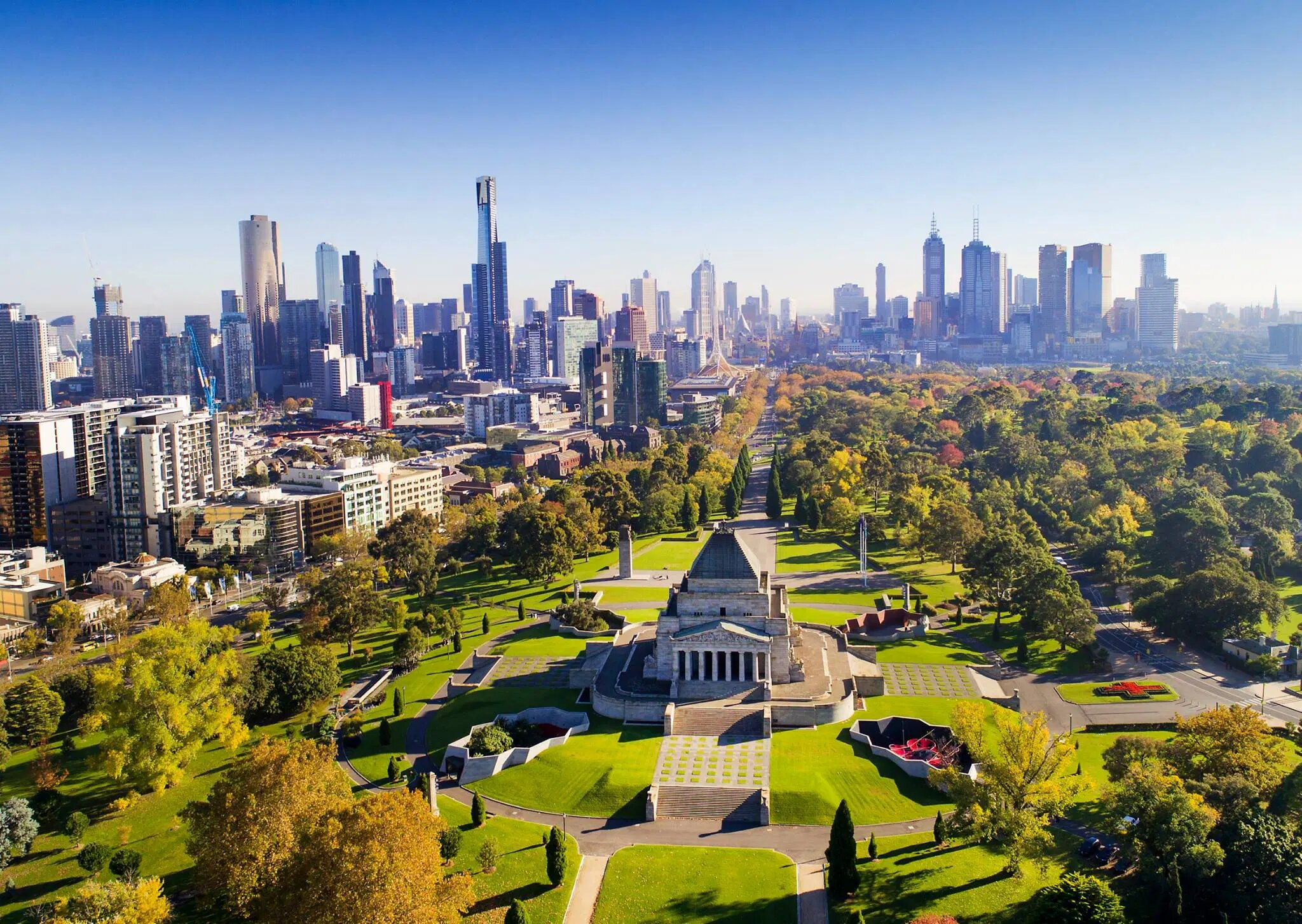
Kuching, Malaysia (top) and Melbourne, Australia (bottom)

== Overview ==
The race starts from Kuching in Sarawak, Malaysia, and ends in Melbourne, Australia, covering a distance of 7,500 kilometres (4,700 mi). Six episodes will be aired 28 October to 2 December 2026. In every episode, a checkpoint is revealed on their departure, and the teams try to reach their destination the fastest they can with their limited budget without flying. Each team are given a budget of £26 per person per day (£840 per person) for their journey. Participants may not subsidise their budgets, but short-term opportunities allow them to work for money or bed and board. The contestants are not allowed access to telephones or the internet, but are provided with a map, travel guide, directory of local jobs, and GPS tracker.

== Contestants ==
Name	Relationship	Occupation	Age	Ref.
Ella Eyre	Childhood friends	Singer-songwriter	32	
Nana Pepera	Childhood friends	Operations director	32	
Jeff Stelling	Father and son	Sports broadcaster	71	
Matt Stelling	Father and son	Teacher	26	
Princess Andre	Siblings	Media personality	19	
Junior Andre	Siblings	Singer	21	
Sam Ryder	Best friends	Singer-Songwriter	37	
Kaz Coles	Best friends	Tour manager	38	

== Results summary ==
Colour key:

– Team withdrawn
– Series winners

Teams	Position (by leg)					
Teams	1	2	3	4	5	6
Ella & Nana	1st	1st	4th	4th		
Sam & Kaz	2nd	3rd	2nd	1st		
Jeff & Matt	3rd	2nd	3rd	3rd		
Princess & Junior	4th	4th	1st	1st		

== Route ==
The checkpoints in the fourth celebrity series:

Leg	From	To
1	Harmony Arch; Kuching, Malaysia	Arsela Hotel; Pangkalan Bun, Indonesia
2	Arsela Hotel; Pangkalan Bun, Indonesia	Golden Tulip Balikpapan Hotel & Suites; Balikpapan, Indonesia
3	Golden Tulip Balikpapan Hotel & Suites; Balikpapan, Indonesia	Kampung Berua; Rammang-Rammang, Indonesia
4	Cairns Airport; Cairns, Australia	Catseye Beach; Hamilton Island, Australia

Checkpoints in Series 4: Start, Checkpoint
Checkpoints in Series 4: Resume, Checkpoint, Finish

== Race summary ==
Mode of transportation	Rail Ferry/Boat Bus/coach Taxi Road vehicle Self-drive vehicle (paid) RV Aeroplane Speed Boat
Activity	Working for money and/or bed and board Excursion that cost time and/or money

=== Leg 1: Kuching, Malaysia → Pangkalan Bun, Indonesia ===
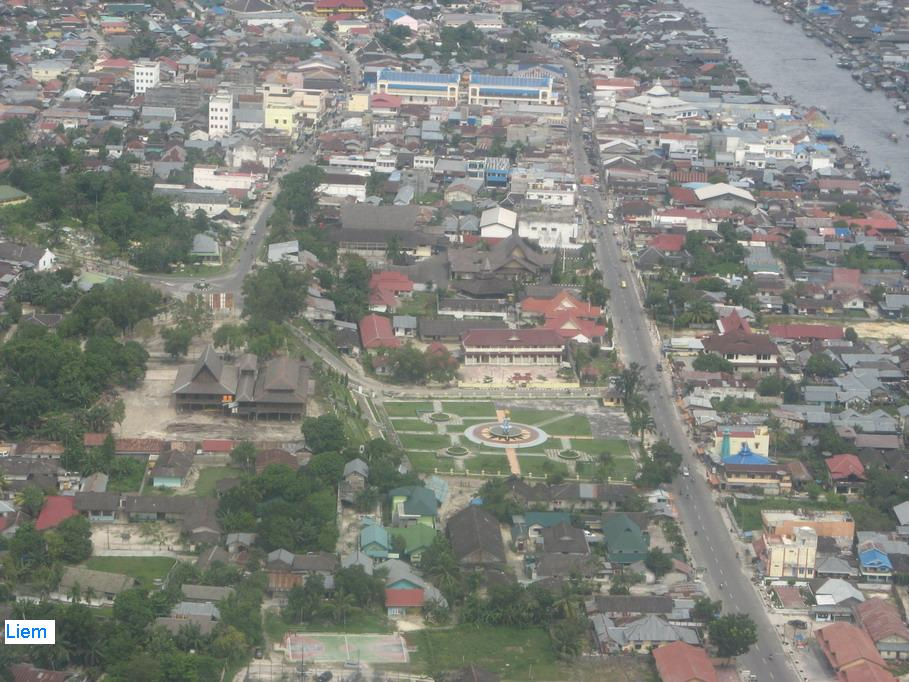
Pangkalan Bun

The checkpoint for the first leg is Pangkalan Bun in Indonesia. Sam & Kaz, the first team to depart, opt to leave Kuching as quickly as they can and take a taxi to the Indonesian border. Ella & Nana also decide to move quickly to the Indonesian border, reaching there by bus at the same time as Sam & Kaz. Jeff & Matt, however, decide to wait until the following morning so they can catch a bus that goes directly to Pontianak.

Princess & Junior are the only team who choose to stay in Malaysia to work, harvesting coconut in a plantation at Mount Kuwai near Sematan. They are given a ride to the border by the owner of the coconut plantation, but have to stay another night in Malaysia as the border has closed for the day.

From the border Ella & Nana go to Tayan where they work in a rice field harvesting rice in exchange for a night stay at a village Nek Bindang. Sam & Kaz go from the border to Batang Tarang to work re-potting durian for their accommodation at Tae Village. The next day, Ella & Nana take a risk waiting for the only bus at night that goes to Pangkalan Bun, while Sam & Kaz, unaware that there is a bus that goes directly to Pangkalan Bun, take a detour to Pontianak where they take a bus to Pangkalan Bun. The risk Ella & Nana take pays off and they are the first team to reach Pangkalan Bun nearly a day before Sam & Kaz.

Jeff & Matt reach Pontianak before Sam & Kaz, and from there travel via the waterways to Sukadana. However, they have to take an expensive taxi ride to reach Pangkalan Bun.

After Princess & Junior reach Sambas, they take a bus to Pontianak, and then on to Pangkalan Bun. They are the last team to arrive.

Order	Teams	Route	Hours behind leaders	Money left
1	Ella & Nana	Kuching → Serian → Tebedu (border crossing) Entikong → Tayan → Nek Bindang → Tayan → Pangkalan Bun	—N/a	93%
2	Sam & Kaz	Kuching → Tebedu (border crossing) Entikong → Batang Tarang → Tae Village → Batang Tarang → Pontianak → Pangkalan Bun	18 hours 18 minutes	91%
3	Jeff & Matt	Kuching → Pontianak → Sukadana → Pangkalan Bun	18 hours 37 minutes	87%
4	Princess & Junior	Kuching → Bau → Sematan → Mount Kuwai → Biawak (border crossing) → Sambas → Pontianak → Pangkalan Bun	25 hours 13 minutes	90%

=== Leg 2: Pangkalan Bun → Balikpapan, Indonesia ===
Balikpapan

The checkpoint this week is Balikpapan on the east coast of Kalimantan. Ella & Nana are the first team to leave, and they choose to go via a direct route through the interior. They work in Sei Gohong in exchange for a chance to see orangutans in their natural environment in Tangkiling.

The three teams leave Pangkalan Bun around the same time, and all teams have to go through Palangka Raya. From there Jeff & Matt opt for the interior route to Amuntai, while the other two teams choose to go via the more reliable Trans Kalimantan Highway to the south. Jeff & Matt take a shared taxi to Amuntai, but find that it has diverted to Banjarmasin. Sam & Kaz, after working in a billiard bar in Palangka Raya, take a bus to Banjarmasin before moving to the interior to Loksado where they work at a glamping lodge moving rocks to secure the riverbank. Princess & Junior go to Kuala Kapuas where they harvest purun reeds for weaving to pay for their accommodation.

From Tangkiling, Ella & Nana take a taxi to Buntok, before hopping on a bus to Amuntai. From there they travel by bus to Balikpapan, finishing in first place.

Jeff & Matt also reach Amuntai where they work among the Banjar people to clean stables for swamp buffalo. From there they take a bus to Balikpapan. Sam & Kaz choose the faster option of a taxi to Balikpapan, but unfortunately for them, the ferry they take to cross the Bay of Balikpapan from Penajam to Kariangau in Balikpapan breaks down in the middle of the bay, allowing Jeff & Matt to overtake them to second place.

Princess & Junior take a taxi further south to Asam Asam before travelling north to Balikpapan. They again finish last.

Order	Teams	Route	Hours behind leaders	Money left
1	Ella & Nana	Pangkalan Bun → Palangka Raya → Sei Gohong → Tangkiling → Buntok → Amuntai → → Balikpapan	—N/a	84%
2	Jeff & Matt	Pangkalan Bun → Palangka Raya → Banjarmasin → Amuntai → Penajam → Kariangau → Balikpapan	4 hours 7 minutes	81%
3	Sam & Kaz	Pangkalan Bun → Palangka Raya → Banjarmasin → Loksado → Penajam → Kariangau → Balikpapan	4 hours 25 minutes	81%
4	Princess & Junior	Pangkalan Bun → Palangka Raya → Kuala Kapuas → Asam Asam → → → Balikpapan	13 hours 3 minutes	80%

=== Leg 3: Balikpapan → Rammang-Rammang, Indonesia ===
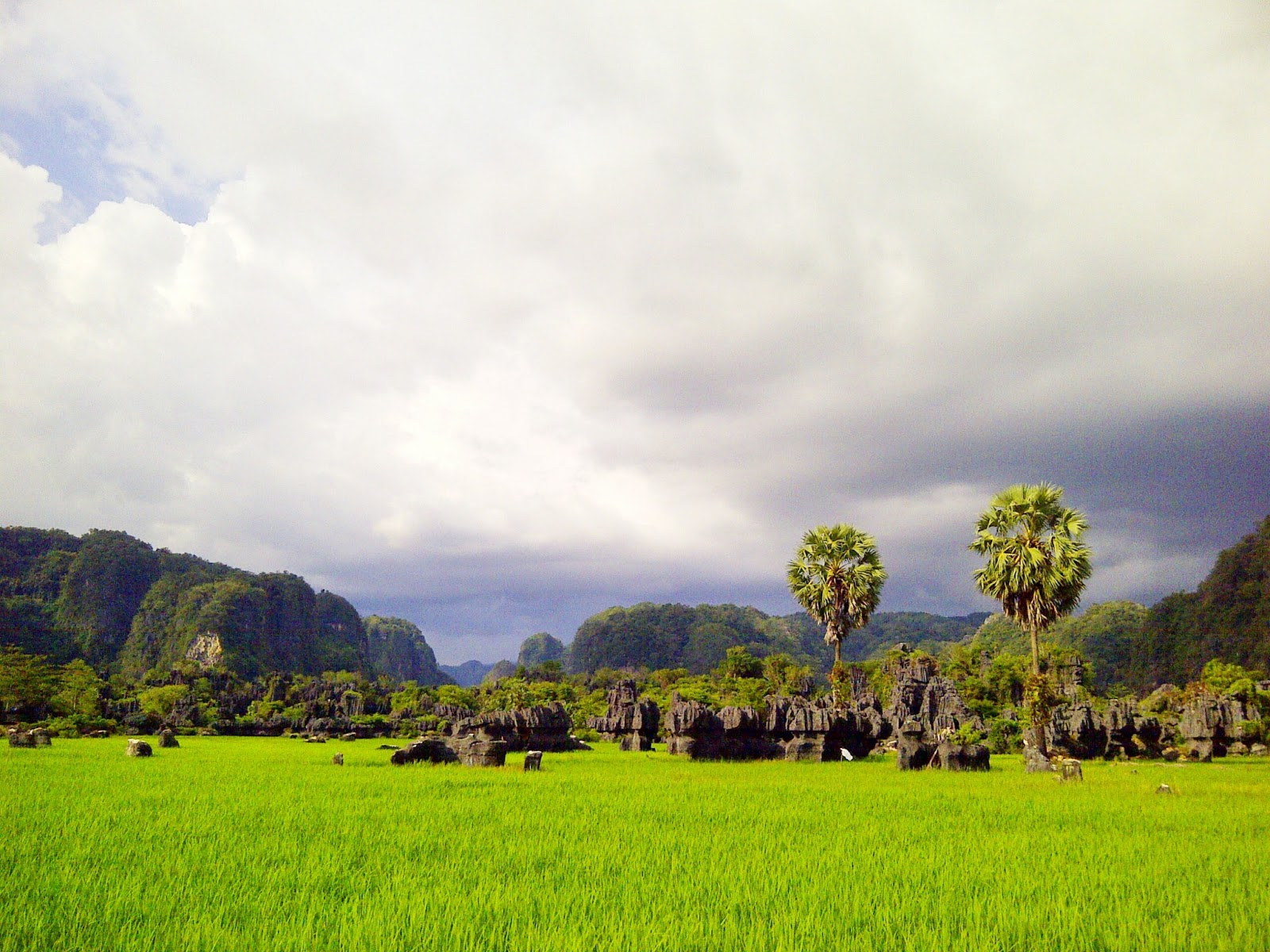
Rammang-Rammang

The checkpoint this leg is Rammang-Rammang on the island of Sulawesi. All teams need to cross the Makassar Strait from Balikpapan in Borneo to Palu in Sulawesi. There is, however, only one ferry in three days, and all teams despite departing 13 hours apart end up on the same ferry crossing and on an equal footing at the start of the race.

On reaching Palu, Ella & Nana and Sam & Kaz choose an inland route to travel to Rammang-Rammang, while Jeff & Matt and Princess & Junior opt to travel along the coast. Princess & Junior, keen not to finish last again, are quick to take a taxi to Limboro. Sam & Kaz, once they realise there is no bus for the night, also decide take a taxi to Tentena, a town by Lake Poso, where they work for bed and board at a lakeside lodge. Jeff & Matt, however, decide to wait for a bus to Mamuju the next day to save money. Ella & Nana try but fail to secure a bus ticket and have to take a 20-hour taxi ride the next day to Palopo, where they work in a sago factory.

From Limboro, Princess & Junior take another expensive taxi to Desa Bonda where they work painting fishing boats for a fisherman to replenish their funds. A further taxi ride to Rammang-Rammang takes the pair to a first place finish.

Sam & Kaz go from Tentena to Mangkutana where they harvest coffee cherries by hand. They become stranded by a thunderstorm which delays their departure. After the storm passed, they take an overnight taxi ride to Rammang-Rammang, coming in second to Princess & Junior.

Jeff & Matt, after suffering a bus breakdown on the way to Mamuju, reach Karampuang Island where they help to clear detritus from the beach. From there they continue with the strategy of taking the cheap option of a bus to Parepare.

Ella & Nana choose peace over speed to work in a floating community on Lake Tempe.

Order	Teams	Route	Hours behind leaders	Money left
1	Princess & Junior	Balikpapan → Palu → Limboro → Desa Bonda → → Rammang-Rammang	—N/a	63%
2	Sam & Kaz	Balikpapan → Palu → Tentena → Mangkutana → Rammang-Rammang	1 hour and 26 minutes	72%
3	Jeff & Matt	Balikpapan → Palu → Karampuang Island → Mamuju → Parepare → Rammang-Rammang	22 hour and 23 minutes	73%
4	Ella & Nana	Balikpapan → Palu → Palopo → Lake Tempe → Rammang-Rammang	25 hour and 36 minutes	74%

=== Leg 4: Cairns, Australia → Hamilton Island, Australia ===
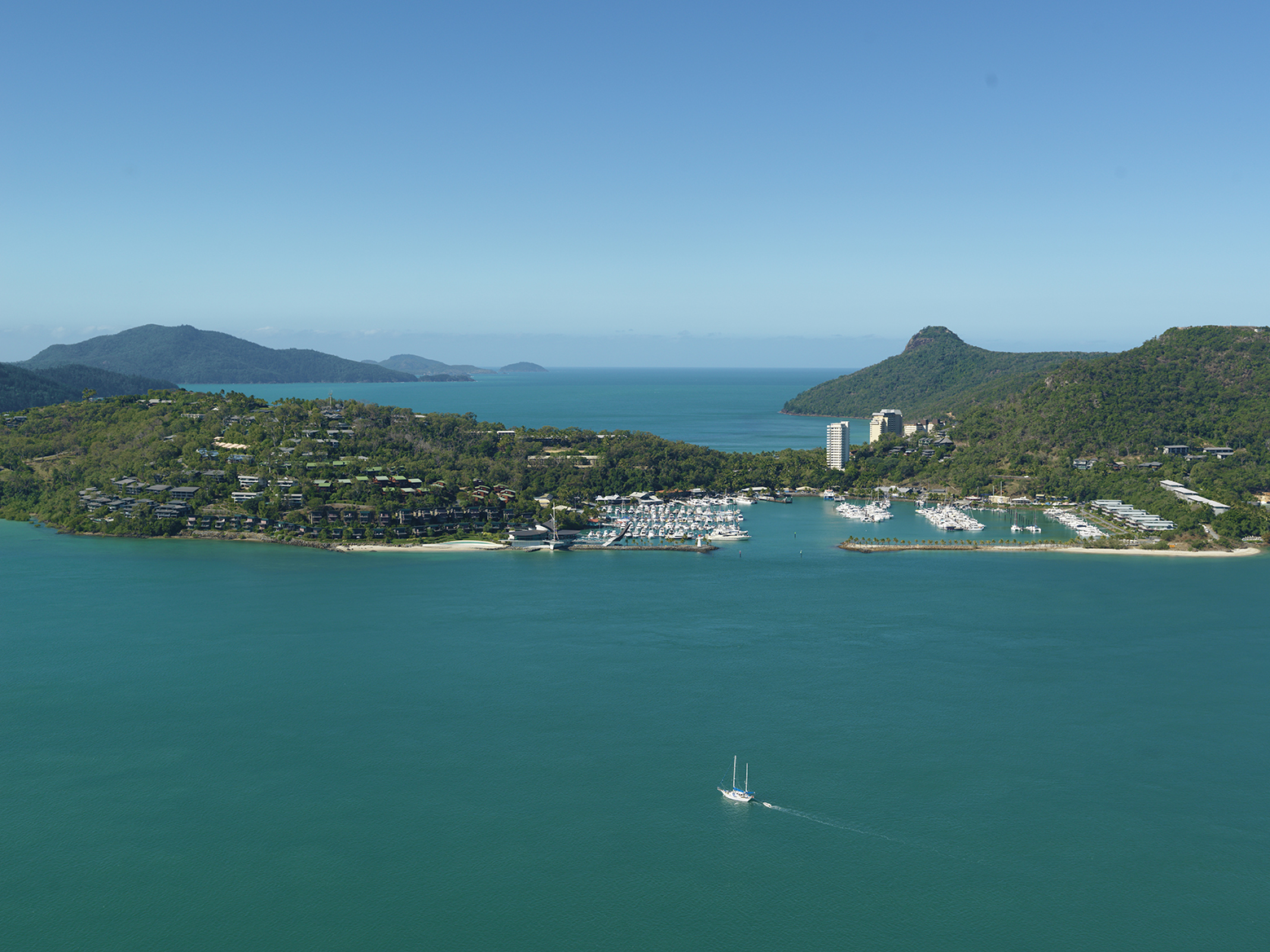
Hamilton Island, Australia

Order	Teams	Route	Hours behind leaders	Money left
1	Princess & Junior		—N/a	
1	Sam & Kaz		—N/a	
3	Jeff & Matt		23 minutes	
4	Ella & Nana		5 hours	

== Ratings ==
Episode no.	Airdate	7 days		28 days	
Episode no.	Airdate	Total viewers (millions)	Ranking (all channels)	Total viewers (millions)	Ranking (all channels)
1	28 October 2026				
2	4 November 2026				
3	11 November 2026				
4	18 November 2026				
5	25 November 2026				
6	2 December 2026				
