= San Miguel, La Guajira =

San Miguel
- Populated center
- Location in La Guajira and Colombia San Miguel (Colombia)
- Coordinates: 10°57′42″N 73°28′51″W
- Country: Colombia
- Department: La Guajira Department
- Municipality: Dibulla Municipality
- Elevation: 5,459 ft (1,664 m)
- Time zone: UTC-5 (Colombia Standard Time)

San Miguel is a populated center of Colombia in Dibulla Municipality, La Guajira Department in Colombia. It is located at the foothills of Sierra Nevada de Santa Marta mountain range.

== Climate ==
San Miguel has a subtropical highland climate (Cfb) with moderate rainfall from December to March and heavy to very heavy rainfall from April to November. It is the wettest place in the department of La Guajira.

Climate data for San Miguel
Month	Jan	Feb	Mar	Apr	May	Jun	Jul	Aug	Sep	Oct	Nov	Dec	Year
Mean daily maximum °C (°F)	21.3 (70.3)	22.4 (72.3)	22.5 (72.5)	22.6 (72.7)	22.7 (72.9)	22.6 (72.7)	23.2 (73.8)	23.1 (73.6)	22.5 (72.5)	21.6 (70.9)	21.6 (70.9)	22.1 (71.8)	22.3 (72.2)
Daily mean °C (°F)	16.1 (61.0)	16.7 (62.1)	17.1 (62.8)	17.4 (63.3)	17.6 (63.7)	17.9 (64.2)	17.9 (64.2)	17.7 (63.9)	17.7 (63.9)	17.2 (63.0)	16.9 (62.4)	16.4 (61.5)	17.2 (63.0)
Mean daily minimum °C (°F)	10.9 (51.6)	11.0 (51.8)	11.8 (53.2)	12.3 (54.1)	12.5 (54.5)	13.2 (55.8)	12.6 (54.7)	12.4 (54.3)	12.9 (55.2)	12.8 (55.0)	12.3 (54.1)	10.7 (51.3)	12.1 (53.8)
Average rainfall mm (inches)	41 (1.6)	47 (1.9)	84 (3.3)	283 (11.1)	416 (16.4)	210 (8.3)	124 (4.9)	246 (9.7)	331 (13.0)	476 (18.7)	340 (13.4)	87 (3.4)	2,685 (105.7)
Source: Climate-Data.org
