= Tyler West =

English radio presenter (born 1996)

- Born: Tyler Mark West; 1 April 1996 (age 30); Sutton, South London, England
- Occupations: Television and radio presenter; DJ
- Employer(s): BBC; Bauer Media Audio UK
- Partner(s): Molly Rainford (2023–present; engaged)
- Website: tylerwest.co.uk

Tyler Mark West (born 1 April 1996) is an English television and radio presenter and DJ. He began his career presenting various shows on CBBC and currently presents KISS Breakfast on the British radio station Kiss with Chloe Burrows. In 2022, he became a contestant on the 20th series of Strictly Come Dancing. In 2025, he competed in the third series of Celebrity Race Across the World with his partner Molly Rainford.. Since 2026, he has co-presented the online spin-off show Strictly: Lights Up alongside comedian Abi Clarke.

== Life and career ==
Tyler Mark West was born on 1 April 1996 in Sutton, South London. His mother, Debbie works for the NHS. He went to Carshalton Boys Sports College. At a young age, he began playing handball and represented GB on the National team. He began his entertainment career on children’s television presenting various shows on CBBC, including Match of the Day Kickabout and other features on the channel. Then in 2017, West began presenting MTV News, covering entertainment and trending news on a weekly basis. In 2018, West became one of the presenters of the live trivia game HQ Trivia and between August and November, he presented his own podcast Every Day Hustle, which featured West talking to a new guest each week about their journey of becoming creators, entrepreneurs and inventors.

In 2019, West joined the radio network Kiss as a presenter, initially hosting the 7–11pm slot between Monday and Thursday. Six months later, he began presenting on Kiss Drive Time from 4–7pm on Monday to Friday, which he continued to do until January 2026. He has since been presenting KISS Breakfast with co-host Chloe Burrows. In 2020, West presented the podcast for Celebrity Ex on the Beach on MTV and co-hosted the 2020 EE BAFTA Awards red carpet live show in partnership with Facebook. In 2021, West began presenting Flat Out Fabulous on BBC Three, an interior design show for millennials alongside singer and interior designer Whinnie Williams. He was also announced as a presenter for the online series The MTV Movie Show. In August 2022, West was announced to be competing in the twentieth series of the BBC competition series Strictly Come Dancing. Upon joining the line-up, West said he was "so gassed". On 2 October 2022, West ran the London Marathon in a time of 5 hours 25 minutes, competing to raise money for the charity UK Youth. West had competed in Strictly the previous day and would compete again the following week, eventually being eliminated on 20 November in Week 9 as a 'shock elimination' which caused complaints from viewers. In October 2023, West participated in Series 7, Week 4 of Richard Osman's House of Games.

In March 2023, West confirmed that he is dating fellow Strictly Come Dancing contestant and actress Molly Rainford.
