= Kapuas Regency =

Regency in Central Kalimantan, Indonesia

Kapuas Regency Kabupaten Kapuas
- Regency
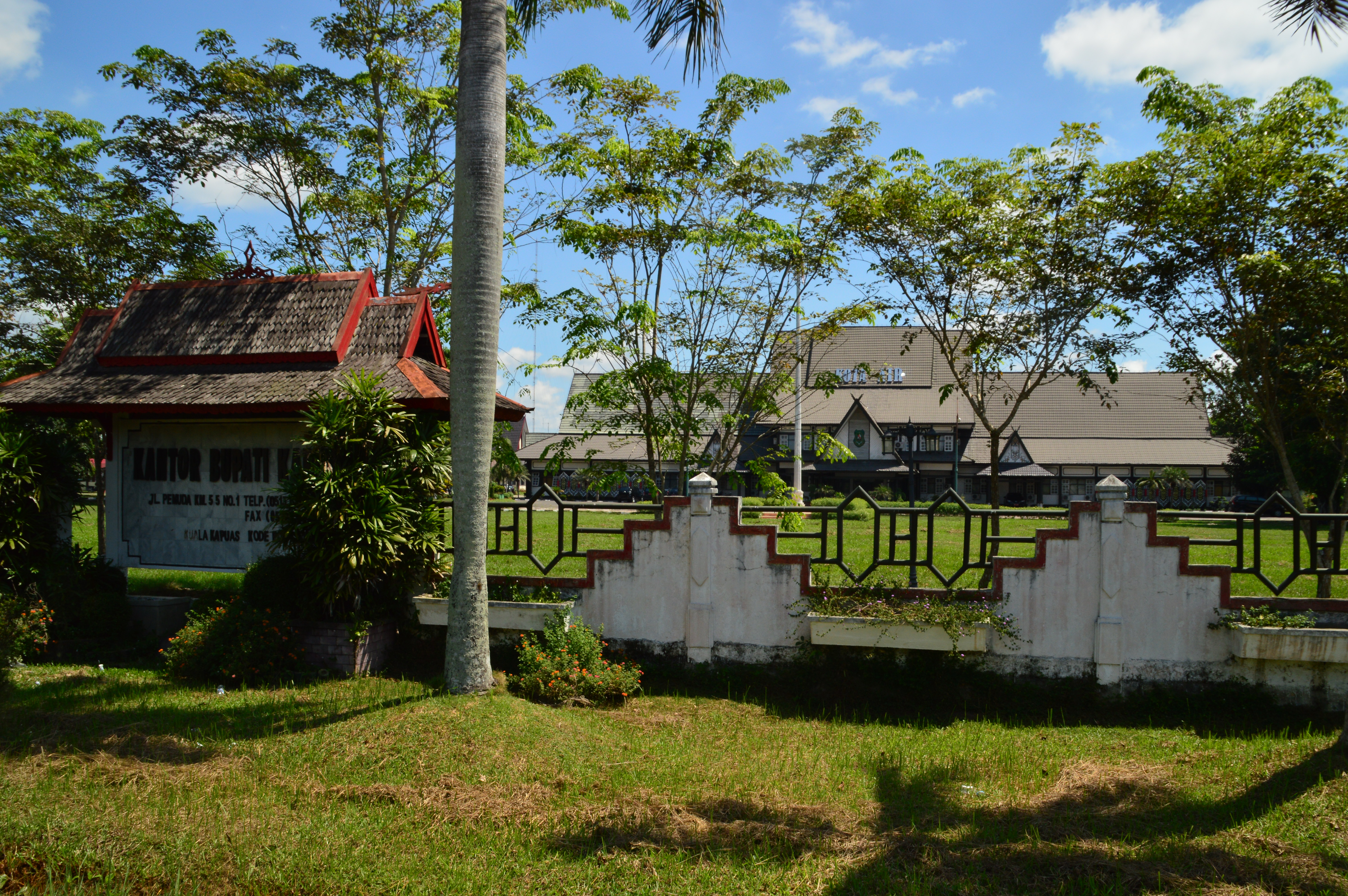
- Regent office of Kapuas

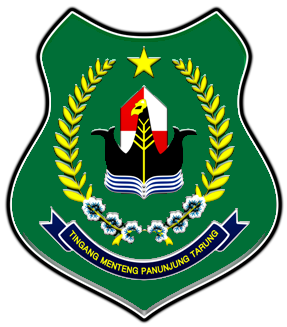
- Coat of arms
- Motto(s): "Tingang Menteng Panunjung Tarung"; Ngaju language: "Collective willpower to actualize dignified prosperity of the people"
- Location within Central Kalimantan

- Location in Kalimantan and Indonesia Kapuas Regency (Indonesia)
- Coordinates: 3°00′00″S 114°22′48″E
- Country: Indonesia
- Region: Kalimantan
- Province: Central Kalimantan
- Capital: Kuala Kapuas

Government
  - Regent: Muhammad Wiyatno
  - Vice Regent: Dodo

Area
  - Total: 17,070.39 km^{2} (6,590.91 sq mi)

Population (mid 2025 estimate)
  - Total: 435,070
  - Density: 25.487/km^{2} (66.011/sq mi)
- Time zone: UTC+7 (Western Indonesia Time)
- Area code: (+62) 513
- Website: kapuaskab.go.id

Kapuas Regency (Indonesian: Kabupaten Kapuas) is one of the thirteen regencies (kabupaten) which comprise Central Kalimantan Province, on the island of Kalimantan, Indonesia. It formerly covered a wider area of nearly 36,000 km^{2}, but on 10 April 2002 two new regencies (Pulang Pisau Regency and Gunung Mas Regency) were created out of its western districts, and the residual area is now 17,070.39 km.^{2} Its population was 329,646 at the 2010 Census and 410,446 at the 2020 Census; the official estimate as at mid 2025 was 435,070 (comprising 223,720 males and 211,350 females). The administrative centre is the town of Kuala Kapuas (in Selat district, which includes eight of the regency's fifteen urban kelurahan, and had 74,100 inhabitants in mid 2025).

== Geography ==
The total area of Kapuas Regency is 17,070.39 square km (11.1% of the area of Central Kalimantan Province), delineated into ebbtide and non-ebbtide areas. It adjoins Gunung Mas Regency, the Java Sea, Barito Selatan Regency and Kalimantan Selatan Province (Barito Kuala Regency), and Pulang Pisau Regency, to the north, south, east and west, respectively.

The north is marked by hills and mountains up to 500 metres above sea level, while the south is coastal and marshy, ebb-tidal and vulnerable to flooding. Rivers in Kapuas Regency are the Kapuas and Kapuas Murung, 600 and 66.38 km in length, respectively. There are four canals: Anjir Serapat (28 km in length;) and Anjir Tamban (25 km), each connecting Kuala Kapuas with Banjarmasin, running through Kalimantan Tengah (for 13–14 km) and Kalimantan Selatan (12–14 km); the Anjir Kalampan (14.5 km), connecting Mandomai, the capital of Kapuas Barat district, with Pulang Pisau Regency; and the Anjir Basarang (24 km), connecting Kuala Kapuas with Pulang Pisau.

== Administration ==
In 2009 there were 204 villages (190 rural desa and 14 urban kelurahan). These were categorised as 44 traditional (swadaya), 61 transitional (swakarya) and 59 development (swasembada) villages, 6 isolated villages/wards (2.94 percent) and 52 poor villages/wards (25.49 percent). In 2009, there were 190 desa heads, 160 desa secretaries, 950 desa staff, 14 kelurahan heads and 14 kelurahan secretaries. In 2023 there were 231 villages, comprising 214 rural desa and 17 urban kelurahan.

== Administrative districts ==
Kapuas Regency consists of seventeen districts (kecamatan), tabulated below with their areas and population totals from the 2010 Census and from the 2020 Census, together with the official estimates as of mid 2025. The table also includes the locations of the district administrative centres, the number of administrative villages (totaling 214 rural desa and 17 urban kelurahan) in each district, and their postal codes.

Kode Wilayah	Name of District (kecamatan)	Area in km^{2}	Pop'n Census 2010	Pop'n Census 2020	Pop'n Estimate mid 2025	Admin centre	No. of villages	Post codes
62.03.04	Kapuas Kuala ^{(a)}	401.02	18,763	22,016	22,870	Lupak Dalam	13	73583
62.03.13	Tamban Catur	90.69	14,592	16,806	17,300	Tamban Baru Tengah	10	73582
62.03.03	Kapuas Timur (East Kapuas)	184.68	23,535	29,964	32,380	Anjir Serapat Baru	7	73581
62.03.01	Selat	70.61	56,902	69,813	74,100	Selat Dalam	10 ^{(b)}	73511 - 73516
62.03.17	Bataguh	413.56	33,747	42,243	45,280	Pulau Kupang	15 ^{(c)}	73516
62.03.08	Basarang	221.14	18,073	23,601	25,820	Basarang	14	73564
62.03.02	Kapuas Hilir (Lower Kapuas)	82.11	13,036	14,592	14,820	Barimba	8 ^{(d)}	73521-73525
62.03.06	Pulau Petak	185.04	18,873	22,997	24,330	Sei Tatas	12	73592
62.03.07	Kapuas Murung	444.73	24,589	28,397	29,270	Palingkau Baru	23 ^{(e)}	73594
62.03.16	Dadahup	602.91	11,253	13,514	14,200	Dadahup	13	73593
62.03.05	Kapuas Barat (West Kapuas)	428.88	18,412	21,939	22,960	Mandomai	12 ^{(f)}	73552
Sub-totals	Southern sector	3,125.38	251,775	305,882	323,310	Kuala Kapuas	137	
62.03.09	Mantangai	6,340.71	35,500	45,297	49,000	Mantangai Tengah	38	73553
62.03.10	Timpah	1,915.68	9,548	12,010	12,900	Timpah	9	73554
62.03.11	Kapuas Tengah (Central Kapuas)	1,961.80	14,009	18,178	19,830	Pulon	13	73555
62.03.14	Pasak Talawang	969.47	5,920	10,707	10,930	Jangkang	10	73557
62.03.12	Kapuas Hulu (Upper Kapuas)	1,193.57	7,546	11,675	11,920	Sei Hanyu	14	74581
62.03.15	Mandau Talawang	1,563.78	5,348	6,697	7,180	Sei Pinang	10	73556
Sub-totals	Northern sector	13,945.01	77,871	104,564	111,760		94	
	Totals	17,070.39	329,646	410,446	435,070	Kuala Kapuas	231	

Notes: (a) includes the offshore island of Pulau Roko. (b) comprising 8 kelurahan (Murung Keramat, Panamas, Selat Barat, Selat Dalam, Selat Hilir, Selat Hulu, Selat Tengah and Selat Utara) and 2 desa.
(c) including one kelurahan (Pulau Kupang). (d) comprising 5 kelurahan (Barimba, Dahirang, Hampatung, Mambulau Sei Pasah) and 3 desa.
(e) includes 2 kelurahan (Palingkau Baru and Palingkau Lama). (f) including one kelurahan (Mandomai).

== Climate ==
Kapuas Kuala, the seat of the regency, has a tropical rainforest climate (Af) with heavy rainfall in all months except July and August.

Climate data for Kapuas Kuala
Month	Jan	Feb	Mar	Apr	May	Jun	Jul	Aug	Sep	Oct	Nov	Dec	Year
Mean daily maximum °C (°F)	29.2 (84.6)	30.0 (86.0)	30.4 (86.7)	31.0 (87.8)	31.1 (88.0)	30.9 (87.6)	31.4 (88.5)	32.1 (89.8)	32.4 (90.3)	32.0 (89.6)	31.0 (87.8)	30.2 (86.4)	31.0 (87.8)
Daily mean °C (°F)	25.6 (78.1)	26.3 (79.3)	26.6 (79.9)	26.9 (80.4)	27.0 (80.6)	26.6 (79.9)	26.8 (80.2)	27.2 (81.0)	27.4 (81.3)	27.2 (81.0)	26.7 (80.1)	26.5 (79.7)	26.7 (80.1)
Mean daily minimum °C (°F)	22.1 (71.8)	22.6 (72.7)	22.8 (73.0)	22.9 (73.2)	22.9 (73.2)	22.3 (72.1)	22.2 (72.0)	22.3 (72.1)	22.5 (72.5)	22.4 (72.3)	22.5 (72.5)	22.8 (73.0)	22.5 (72.5)
Average rainfall mm (inches)	301 (11.9)	321 (12.6)	280 (11.0)	242 (9.5)	215 (8.5)	132 (5.2)	103 (4.1)	116 (4.6)	137 (5.4)	140 (5.5)	222 (8.7)	287 (11.3)	2,496 (98.3)
Source: Climate-Data.org

== Population ==
The 2010 census recorded 329,646 people, including 167,937 males (50.98%) and 161,503 females (49.02%). The 2020 Census total rose to 410,446, and the estimated population was 435,070 in mid 2025. The 2025 population density was 25.487 people per km^{2}, ranging from a high of 1,049 per km^{2} in urbanised Selat District (with includes the built-up area of Kapuas town) to only 5.07 per km^{2} in Mandau Talawang District.

== Demographics ==
Religion as of 2018:

- Muslim 77.71%
- Protestant 12.15%
- Hindu 9.35%
- Roman Catholic 0.77%
- Buddhist 0.01%
- Confucian 0.00%

== Social ==
Education is a development sector given priority by government (1945 Constitution mandate, as stated in article no 31 point 2), with an ultimate aim of improving the quality of human resources in Indonesia. There were 147 kindergartens in the regency, with 390 teachers and 4,181 students in 2009. In 2010, there were 390 Primary schools (including private schools), with 2,736 teachers and 40,714 students, yielding student:teacher ratio of about 14.88. There were 86 Junior High schools (state and private), with 1,085 teachers, 9,667 students and 465 classrooms; 25 Senior High schools (state and private), with 636 teachers and 5,886 students.

The region had only 38 doctors in 2010, resulting in a service ratio of 8,669.
