= El Zonte =

Town in La Libertad Department, El Salvador

- Town
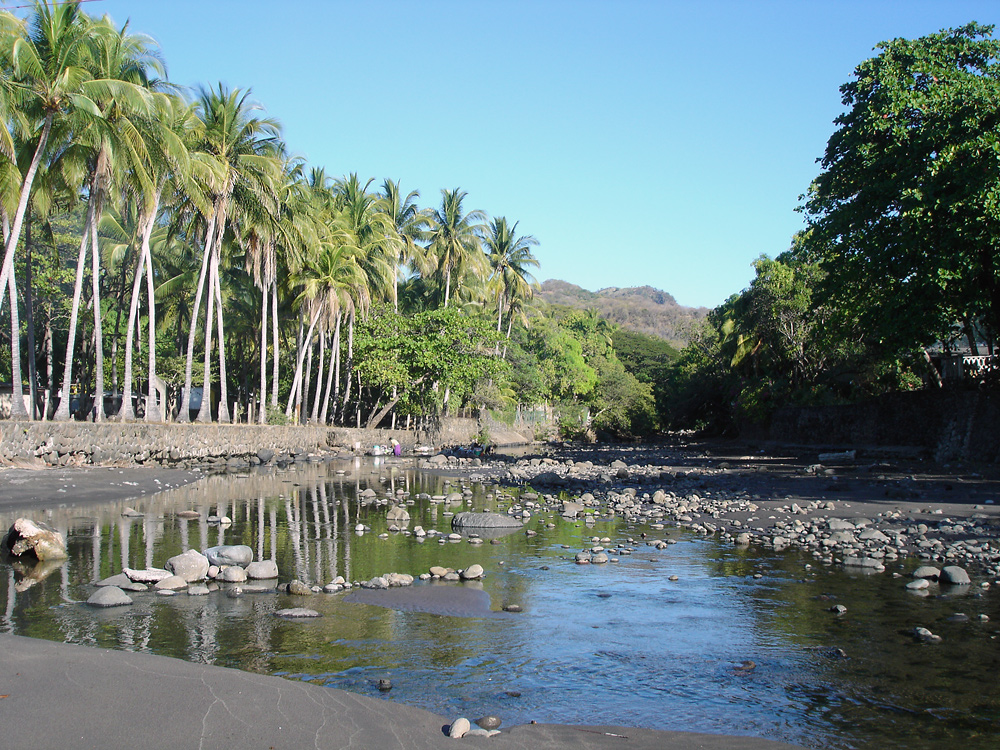

- Location in El Salvador
- Coordinates: 13.495°N 89.440°W
- Country: El Salvador
- Department: La Libertad
  - Mayor: (ARENA)

Population
  - Urban: 3,000

El Zonte is a town in La Libertad Department in El Salvador. A popular tourist destination, El Zonte has been described as a "world surfing mecca". Playa El Zonte (English: El Zonte Beach; nicknamed Bitcoin Beach) became one of the first locales in El Salvador to accept bitcoin as a payment method, and inspired the country's adoption of bitcoin as a legal tender from 2021 until 2025.

== Town profile ==
El Zonte is a town with a population of 3,000. According to Reuters in 2021, "El Zonte is visibly poor, with dirt roads and a faulty drainage system.". El Zonte is located 26 mi (42 km) from San Salvador, the national capital. In Summer 2023, the roads in El Zonte were updated from dirt to brick, as well as an improved drainage system.

The local economy is heavily dependent on tourism, particularly surfing. According to France 24, El Zonte attracts tourists from United States, Canada, Europe, and Brazil looking to surf, with surfing classes costing between $10 and $50 an hour.

In El Zonte, a foreign volunteer-run program called the "Medusas" provide English and art education as well as low-cost surfing instruction. Skateboarding is a popular activity among young residents of El Zonte, and a local community skatepark was established in the town.

== History ==
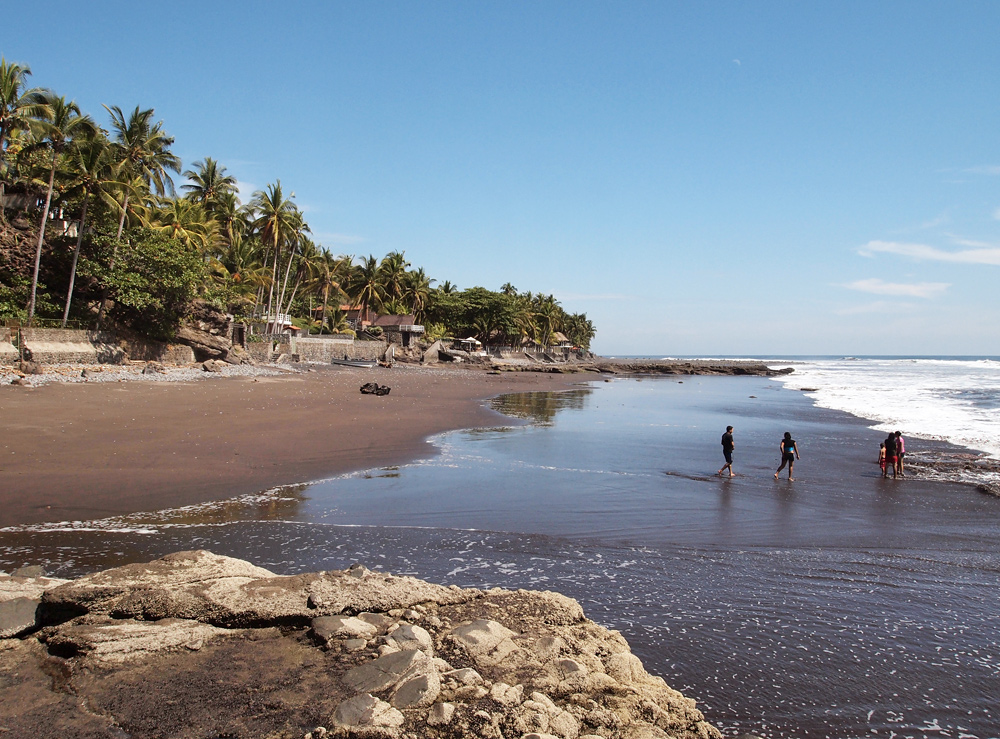

When an anonymous American began sending bitcoin to nonprofits there, nonprofit workers began an initiative to start a local bitcoin ecosystem. The beach became one of the first places in El Salvador to accept bitcoin as a method of payment: President Nayib Bukele cited the town as an inspiration for the Bitcoin Law recognizing the cryptocurrency as one of El Salvador's two official currencies, alongside the U.S. dollar. In early 2025, under pressure from the IMF, El Salvador functionally reversed this policy.

Between 2015 and 2024, the average price per square meter in El Zonte rose by 134.8%, from $34.33 to $80.61 following the Bitcoin Law, and by 2025, some luxury developments are reaching prices of up to $1,058.57 per square meter.

== In popular culture ==
In 2022, the American network HBO premiered an episode of Real Sports with Bryant Gumbel that reported on the development of bitcoin as a legal tender in El Zonte and how it has impacted the community.
