= Palomino, Colombia =

Palomino
- Populated center
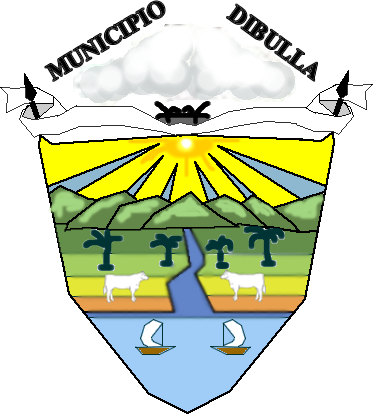
- Flag Seal

- Location of the municipality of Dibulla in La Guajira Department.

- Location in Colombia
- Coordinates: 11°14′39″N 73°33′45″W
- Country: Colombia
- Region: Caribbean
- Department: La Guajira
- Recognized: 1984

Government
  - Mayor: Marlon Amaya Mejia (CC)
- Elevation: 2 m (6.6 ft)

Population (2005)
  - Total: 3,900
- Time zone: UTC-05 (Colombia Standard Time)
- Website: dibulla-laguajira.gov.co
- ^{*}Although originally founded in 1525, Palomino was officially created according to Acuerdo No. 01 de enero 26 de 1984

Palomino is a populated center on the Caribbean coast of Colombia located in the Guajira region of Colombia, approximately 70 km from Santa Marta and 90 km from Riohacha.

== Geography ==
=== Location ===
Palomino is located in the municipality of Dibulla part of the department of Guajira and is only 2 meters above sea level. It is one of the five towns that form the municipality of Dibulla. It is located on the foothills of the Sierra Nevada Mountains of Colombia. The Sierra Nevada de Santa Marta, declared as a Biosphere Reserve by UNESCO, sits as an isolated mountain apart from the Andes chain that runs through Colombia. Reaching an altitude of 5,775 meters above sea level just 42 kilometers from the Caribbean coast, the Sierra Nevada is the world's highest coastal peak. The Sierra Nevada encompasses about 17,000 square kilometers and serves as the source of 36 rivers. Palomino is limited on the north by the Caribbean sea, south with the municipality of San Juan Del Cesar, east by the town of Mingueo and west by the department of Magdalena. Palomino is very close to the Venezuelan border. It borders both the department of Guajira and Magdalena and serves as the border for the municipality of Dibulla and La Punta de los Remedios.

== Climate ==
Palomino has a tropical climate, variant "Am" according to the Köppen climate classification, with moderate to little rainfall from December to May and a wet season from May to November, which features slightly warmer temperatures and heavy to very heavy intermittent rainfall.

Climate data for Palomino
Month	Jan	Feb	Mar	Apr	May	Jun	Jul	Aug	Sep	Oct	Nov	Dec	Year
Mean daily maximum °C (°F)	32.1 (89.8)	32.8 (91.0)	33.0 (91.4)	32.9 (91.2)	32.8 (91.0)	32.9 (91.2)	33.7 (92.7)	33.5 (92.3)	32.6 (90.7)	31.6 (88.9)	31.7 (89.1)	31.8 (89.2)	32.6 (90.7)
Daily mean °C (°F)	27.3 (81.1)	27.9 (82.2)	28.3 (82.9)	28.7 (83.7)	28.8 (83.8)	29.0 (84.2)	29.3 (84.7)	29.2 (84.6)	28.5 (83.3)	27.8 (82.0)	27.8 (82.0)	27.3 (81.1)	28.3 (83.0)
Mean daily minimum °C (°F)	22.6 (72.7)	23.1 (73.6)	23.7 (74.7)	24.5 (76.1)	24.9 (76.8)	25.2 (77.4)	25.0 (77.0)	24.9 (76.8)	24.4 (75.9)	24.1 (75.4)	23.9 (75.0)	22.9 (73.2)	24.1 (75.4)
Average rainfall mm (inches)	27 (1.1)	23 (0.9)	29 (1.1)	100 (3.9)	105 (4.1)	191 (7.5)	123 (4.8)	172 (6.8)	339 (13.3)	452 (17.8)	373 (14.7)	112 (4.4)	2,046 (80.4)

== Economy ==
=== Oil ===
Palomino's location near the Venezuelan border contributes to commerce, movement of people and economic activity. Since gasoline in Venezuela costs nearly a tenth of what it costs in Colombia, contraband oil plays a large part in the economy of the town.

=== Agriculture ===
According to the Farming and Livestock Municipal Sector Plan of 1998–2000, 70 percent of the people in Palomino are small agricultural producers. They cultivate primarily plantain, yuca, ñame, corn and mango in an area of 260 hectares. They also cultivate malanga, ahuyama, orange and cacao through very small, inefficient residential vegetable gardens. Very little produce is grown for commercial sale.

=== Fishing ===
Fishing is popular but not the main economic activity for the town of Palomino. According to INPA, Characterization of the Artisanal Fishing Activity in the Coastal Municipalities of the Department of Guajira in 2000, the present number of fishermen in the area is 0.4 percent of the total population, producing 99.9 tons cap/year. Local fishes are Snapper, Mero, Medregal, Mackerel, Sea Bass, and Sawfish.

=== Livestock ===
In Palomino, livestock is mostly cattle raised for milk and beef. Some of the population has survived by shepherding goats. The production of grass for cattle suffers from the unpredictable Caribbean weather. The technological education and implementation is low as there is a lack of use of fertilizers (organic and chemical) and vaccinations to prevent diseases amongst cattle are nearly non-existent. This causes low production levels and thereby low income generation.

=== Handcrafts ===
The handcrafts elaborated among the town's craftsmen are stone sculpture, archeological figurines made out of pottery, straw hats with traditional patterns, fans, baskets, animal figures made with coconut, religious relics, and labor tools made with bull horns.

=== Tourism ===
Palomino's paradise attracts a low number of tourists even though the jungle landscape is exotic, there is vast biodiversity, and the beaches are white and uninhabited. Palomino is close to the entrance to Sierra Nevada National Park and close to the Resguardo Indigena, or Indian Reserve area. Especially popular is tubing down the Palomino River. Attracting backpackers traveling along Colombia's coast, there has also been a growth of restaurants, cafes, and hostels in recent years. Among the other tourist attractions are:

- Forest Bathing Resort
- Reserva Natural El Matuy, Cabins of Ernesto Uribe
- Camping Las Gaviotas
- Mountains of San Salvador
- Playa (Beach) Larga
- Finca(Farm) La Mello y La Terraza of Ernesto Samper
- La Casa de Guadua Eco Hostal
- Turtle Reserve
- La Boca de Palomino
- Madreviejas and Wetlands of Palomino, Canillal, Boquita del Medio, Limoncito, San Salvado, and La Taguara
- Palomino River
- Hostel Ematur
- The Snow Peaks
- Peaks (Pico Colon, Simon Bolivar, and Reina)
- Various surf clubs, including the original founding school Buscando Olas

== Demographics ==
Palomino has approximately 3,900 people according to the data projections of INPA in December 2000. Nearly 30 percent of the population in Palomino are children between 1 and 15 years of age. The town is shared by a diverse set of ethnic and cultural groups. The majority of the population is Mestizo, followed by Afro-Colombians, Andean farmers and by traditional indigenous groups. The Kogi and Arhuaco Indians that inhabit the Sierra Nevada Mountains visit Palomino constantly to get sea snails, exchange their handmade products or to perform their native rituals on the beach. There are different places on the coast that the Indians consider sacred and where they perform rituals called the black line, in Spanish “Linea Negra, which was recently recognized by the Colombian State. The Kogi have a low demographic density with a population of 5,847 living in the department of Guajira. They are the most traditional indigenous group and are semi-nomad, constantly displacing themselves through the different areas in the valleys of the rivers Tapias, Jerez, San Miguel, Garavito, Rio Ancho, Rio Mariamina, Rio Negro, San Salvador and Palomino. Colombia is a multi-ethnic nation of Europeans, Amerindians, and Afro-descendents.

== Culture ==
When Spaniards arrived in 1502, they did not tolerate the indigenous culture. Today in Colombia there is still racial segregation and discrimination toward Indians and Afro-Colombians. The notions of class and racism are closely intertwined and the armed conflict has torn the cultural fabric that binds this community together.

Palomino has a large variety of ethnic minorities and therefore the culture is diverse and very colorful. The mixing of ethnic traditions is reflected in Palomino's folk dance and music. They have a passion for football sometimes seen as a symbol of unity and pride. The cuisine is developed mainly from the food traditions of the Caribbean.

Palomino used to celebrate the patron's saint, San Isidro Labrodor with solemn mass, fireworks and folk dances. Today, due to the cultural syncretism, this activity has been forgotten. It is expected that community leaders should rescue these traditions and religious manifestations.

=== Religious celebrations ===
- San Isidro Labrador (Patrón) - May 15
- Santa Rita de Cassia - May 22
- San Antonio de Padua - June 13
- Virgen del Carmen - July 16
- Divino Niño - September 3
- San Rafael de Arcángel - October 24
- San Martín de Loba - November 11
- Niño Jesús - December 16–25

== Problems ==
Palomino has long suffered with human rights crisis, loss of cultural identity, intolerance, racial discrimination, lack of clear environmental policies, disappearance of fauna and flora, inefficiency and corruption of the government, abandonment of the authorities and institutions, and even worse the loss of trust in the resolution of conflict and the problems that afflict the inhabitants. The combination of all of these problems coupled with the fact that poverty is highly transmitted from one generation to the next is the main obstacle to the town's sustainable rural development. Inhibiting its progress is the lack of access to social services, education, and skills training.

In the past the town has been used as a battlefield of rival drug gangs, FARC, paramilitary groups, and leftist insurgent groups. Over the last few years inspired by the government's aggressive approach to combat guerrilla warfare, the Palomino community is trying to bring peace into their town, restore tourism and improve the lifestyle of future generations.

== Urban layout ==
Palomino has a linear urban layout that runs from the south, at the San Juan Del Cesar, to the north, at the Caribbean sea. The area is serviced by the highway, Troncal del Caribe, which has split the town into two. It is 300 meters from the beach and 500 meters from the Palomino River. The town square faces the sea and the culture house faces the Sierra Nevada Mountains.

== Infrastructure ==
=== Public sewage system ===
Palomino has no working sewage system, but one third of the sewage pipes are installed. The problem is serious since the town does not have an oxidation lagoon of residual water; even if the rest of the pipes are installed, the pipes lead to nowhere. There is no treatment facility. Some excreta are treated through latrines (small wastewater systems in deep pits), the river or sea, but mostly people practice open air defecation. In some informal neighborhoods such as the Divino Niño, which is currently under sea level, the latrines and small wastewater systems do not work and flooding during the rainy season causes serious sanitation problems. The health hazards of improper excreta disposal in Palomino are soil pollution, water pollution, contamination of foods, and propagation of flies. People experience diseases such as diarrhea, intestinal parasites, viral hepatitis, typhoid fever, and cholera and nearly 30% of children die of these diseases.

=== Waste management and garbage collection ===
The area available for the disposal of solid waste is poorly located on the access road to the beach. The service of garbage collection does not have an organized system to recollect, transport, and dispose of solid waste. It is common to see garbage strewn on the streets since public garbage cans are almost non- existent. The municipality has one garbage collecting truck which services six towns and therefore can only service one small portion of Palomino due to the difficult road conditions. The cost of the service is $2,000 Colombian Pesos per household per month monthly, a large amount for many families living in extreme poverty and not benefiting from the service. A significant amount of the solid waste generated in Palomino is not collected and is either burned openly in the streets or dumped in rivers, the sea or empty lots thereby posing a serious threat to public health.

=== Aqueduct ===
Poverty in Palomino limits access to quality water services and safe drinking water. Rivers and springs are often used as open sewers for human waste and garbage disposal. The shortage of drinking water facilities forces people to drink from these polluted open bodies of water causing malaria, intestinal parasites and diarrhea. The existing aqueduct serves only 324 people; only 10 percent of the population benefits from a residential water supply which is an eight meter deep well relying on a 5,000 liter water tank with one turbine. The population increase has caused problems in the distribution of the residential water supply. In some neighborhoods water is supplied through small reservoirs for rain water, wells or cisterns.

=== Services ===
- Energy: Energy service is irregularly provided by Electricaribe. Not all the population has electricity. 60% of the population has no electric energy and the 40% who do experience daily outages.
- Gas: Service is good and almost the entire population has residential gas. Some people still use wood or coal for cooking.
- Education: Palomino's educational facilities are inadequate, teachers are poorly qualified, drop rates are high and many children do not know how to read or write. Palomino has a rural school, Institución Educativa Rural San Antonio, with 828 students and 26 teachers. The town has another educational center, San Isidro Labrador, with 80 students and 4 teachers. There are also family benefit homes in the neighborhoods of Divino Niño, La Sierrita and Promigas. Palomino has two primary schools in town and two schools in the indigenous area.
- Health: In Palomino there is only one health center servicing approximately 3,900 people. The center has a temporary doctor, a nurse, a dentist that comes once a week. It is currently undergoing expansion to add children development and prenatal control. There are three pharmacies in town.
- Telecommunications: Palomino has a Telecom service center with two telephone lines. Informally, street vendors sell cell phone minutes.
- Roads: The town's main road is in poor shape and unpaved. The access roads to the town's neighborhoods are in very bad condition, mostly dirt roads with limited access to traffic. The construction of a bridge over the first cross of the San Salvador River is necessary in order to cross the river during the flood season.
- Recreation: The town square has a small park, a football field, and a tourist center EMATUR.
- Cultural: The town square has a Catholic church.
- Administrative: The town has a local police station and a correctional center.

== Architecture ==
Colombia's architecture is heavily influenced by the Spanish style and modern architecture began appearing after WWII predominantly in cities. The first modern houses in Palomino began arising between 1940 and 1950 when fishermen informally began occupying a territory previously inhabited by the Kogi indigenous tribe. Palomino's urban layout is similar to the layout of many other coastal towns in Colombia, laid out in an orthogonal grid pattern around a town square. Buildings such a Catholic church, a school, a police station and a health center are located around the town square. The first houses in Palomino were single-family dwellings made of wood and covered with a palm leaf roof. Over time they changed and were built with cement and brick. Today there are few houses in Palomino built with wood.

The construction of the highway Troncal del Caribe the original urban layout gets disorganized and the town begins to grow along the highway during the 80's. The highway divides the town in two, with newer dwellings built closer to the highway and the mountain and older dwellings situated closer to the sea, and thereby creates a segregation of space. During the 90's informal neighborhoods arise inhabited by displaced families who settle in areas below sea level, constantly flooded, with no street access and no access to public services. The architectural style of Palomino is characterized by small one-story houses on small lots of land, deep and narrow with a patio. The houses used to be made of wood but since the 1970s, construction has shifted to concrete with metal roofs and very small windows. The houses lack ventilation and do not respond to the area's soil and climatic conditions.
