= Dibulla, La Guajira =

Dibulla
- town
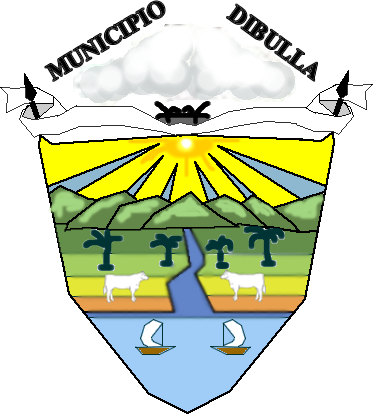
- Flag Coat of arms
- Motto: The ideal place for rebirth
- Location of the town and municipality of Dibulla in La Guajira Department.

- Location in Colombia
- Coordinates: 11°16′0″N 73°18′3″W
- Country: Colombia
- Region: Caribbean
- Department: La Guajira

Government
  - Mayor: Marlon Amaya Mejia (CC)

Area
  - Total: 1,847 km^{2} (713 sq mi)
- Elevation: 2 m (6.6 ft)

Population (2020 est.)
  - Total: 39’069
  - Density: 0.021/km^{2} (0.055/sq mi)
- Time zone: UTC-5
- Climate: Aw

Dibulla (Sometimes spelled Dibuya) is a town and municipality located in the Department of La Guajira, Colombia by the Caribbean Sea and the Sierra Nevada de Santa Marta mountains on the Guajira Peninsula. It was proclaimed municipality in 1995.

The town is mostly recognized for being the birthplace of renown vallenato composer Carlos Huertas and his song "El Cantor de Fonseca".

== Geography ==
Dibulla limits to the west with the Magdalena Department; to the north with the Caribbean Sea by the steps of the Sierra Nevada de Santa Marta mountains (northeastern side). Located 74 km away from La Guajira's capital Riohacha en route to the city of Santa Marta, it is crossed by the river of the same name, the Dibulla River and also the Jérez River.

The municipality has a total area of 1,847 km^{2} and its only 2 m above sea level. The average temperature is of 28 °C. Its main attraction relies on a recreational center called Maziruma, a beach resort.

== History ==
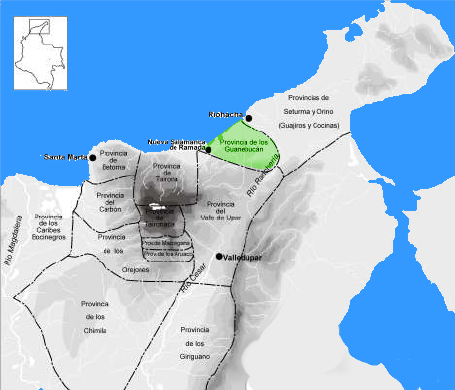
Province of Guanebucanes (Green), part of the Government of Santa Marta created in the year 1524.

The area of present-day municipality of Dibuya was inhabited predominantly during the Pre-Columbian era by indigenous tribes pertaining to the Koguis and Guanebucanes ethnic groups descendants of the Tairona civilization with a direct influence from the Wayuu ethnic group. During the Spanish colonization of the Americas, the indigenous village of Yaharo was first seen by Spanish explorers upon reaching the coasts of the Guajira Peninsula in 1502. In 1525, Spanish explorer Rodrigo de Bastidas visited the Yaharo Town and registered an account of the village. A year before, in 1524 Bastidas had created the Government of Santa Marta which covered an area from Cabo de la Vela to the mouth of the Magdalena River.

Between 1609 and 1640, the Spanish colonizers imported some 800 or more African slaves. Most of these later escaped and formed Palenques. In 1679 the Government of Santa Marta offered these palenques their freedom in exchange of protecting the territory from English pirates.

In 1846 then President of Colombia, Gen. Tomas Cipriano de Mosquera ordered the reestablishment of the government after the War of the Supremes civil war. Yaharo was renamed to Dibuya which translates from the Guanebucan language to "lagoon by the sea", lagoon which is located in the region of the Ramada.

In 1872 Dibuya became a municipality seat or district by law 216 of this same year and was part of the Department of Magdalena. In 1886 this category was removed by interim governor of the department Luis Cotes by Decree 377 of February 17, 1886 when the United States of Colombia was dissolved. The Council of Riohacha formally created the Corregimiento of Dibuya on April 1, 1887.

From the 1970s and until approximately 1989 two families from the Department of La Guajira; the Cárdenas and the Valdeblánquez engaged in a war for the control of the marijuana. The confrontation between the two families gained national attention and directly affected those family members living in Dibuya, as well as those living from Barranquilla and Santa Marta to Riohacha, Maicao and Valledupar in the Caribbean Region of Colombia.

On December 5, 1995 the Department Assembly of La Guajira created the Municipality of Dibuya by Ordinance 030 of that same year. Cristian Montero Córdoba became its first appointed mayor by Decree 350 of December 28, 1995.

== Climate ==
Climate data for Dibulla (Termoguajira), elevation 5 m (16 ft), (1981–2010)
Month	Jan	Feb	Mar	Apr	May	Jun	Jul	Aug	Sep	Oct	Nov	Dec	Year
Mean daily maximum °C (°F)	30.9 (87.6)	30.8 (87.4)	30.5 (86.9)	30.9 (87.6)	31.6 (88.9)	32.4 (90.3)	32.9 (91.2)	32.6 (90.7)	31.6 (88.9)	31.1 (88.0)	30.9 (87.6)	30.6 (87.1)	31.4 (88.5)
Daily mean °C (°F)	26.1 (79.0)	26.0 (78.8)	26.1 (79.0)	26.6 (79.9)	27.0 (80.6)	27.5 (81.5)	27.8 (82.0)	27.5 (81.5)	26.8 (80.2)	26.5 (79.7)	26.3 (79.3)	26.3 (79.3)	26.7 (80.1)
Mean daily minimum °C (°F)	19.4 (66.9)	19.0 (66.2)	19.8 (67.6)	20.6 (69.1)	21.2 (70.2)	21.7 (71.1)	21.6 (70.9)	21.2 (70.2)	21.1 (70.0)	21.2 (70.2)	21.4 (70.5)	20.7 (69.3)	20.9 (69.6)
Average precipitation mm (inches)	28.9 (1.14)	17.0 (0.67)	34.3 (1.35)	87.7 (3.45)	135.0 (5.31)	100.2 (3.94)	59.6 (2.35)	149.2 (5.87)	227.6 (8.96)	300.2 (11.82)	256.7 (10.11)	90.1 (3.55)	1,437.3 (56.59)
Average precipitation days	1	2	3	6	8	7	4	9	14	14	12	5	82
Average relative humidity (%)	84	83	83	83	84	83	82	82	84	85	85	85	84
Mean monthly sunshine hours	232.5	175.0	186.0	156.0	145.7	186.0	210.8	192.2	159.0	164.3	168.0	198.4	2,173.9
Mean daily sunshine hours	7.5	6.2	6.0	5.2	4.7	6.2	6.8	6.2	5.3	5.3	5.6	6.4	5.9
Source: Instituto de Hidrologia Meteorologia y Estudios Ambientales

== Politics ==
=== Administrative divisions ===
The Municipality of Dibulla is made formed by five corregimientos, two inspecciones de policía (Police Inspections) and twenty nine veredas:

==== Dibulla neighborhoods ====
- El Peru
- La Marina
- Las casitas
- Miramar
- Rincon Guapo
- Tierra Baja

==== Corregimientos ====
- Campana Nuevo
- La Punta de los Remedios
- Las Flores
- Mingueo
- Palomino
- Rio Ancho

==== Veredas ====
- Casa Aluminio
- Chimgale
- Cuatro Veredas
- El Cerro Jerez
- El Limonal
- Larga La Vida
- Mosca
