= Kuala Kapuas =

Kuala Kapuas Kota Kuala Kapuas
- Regency seat
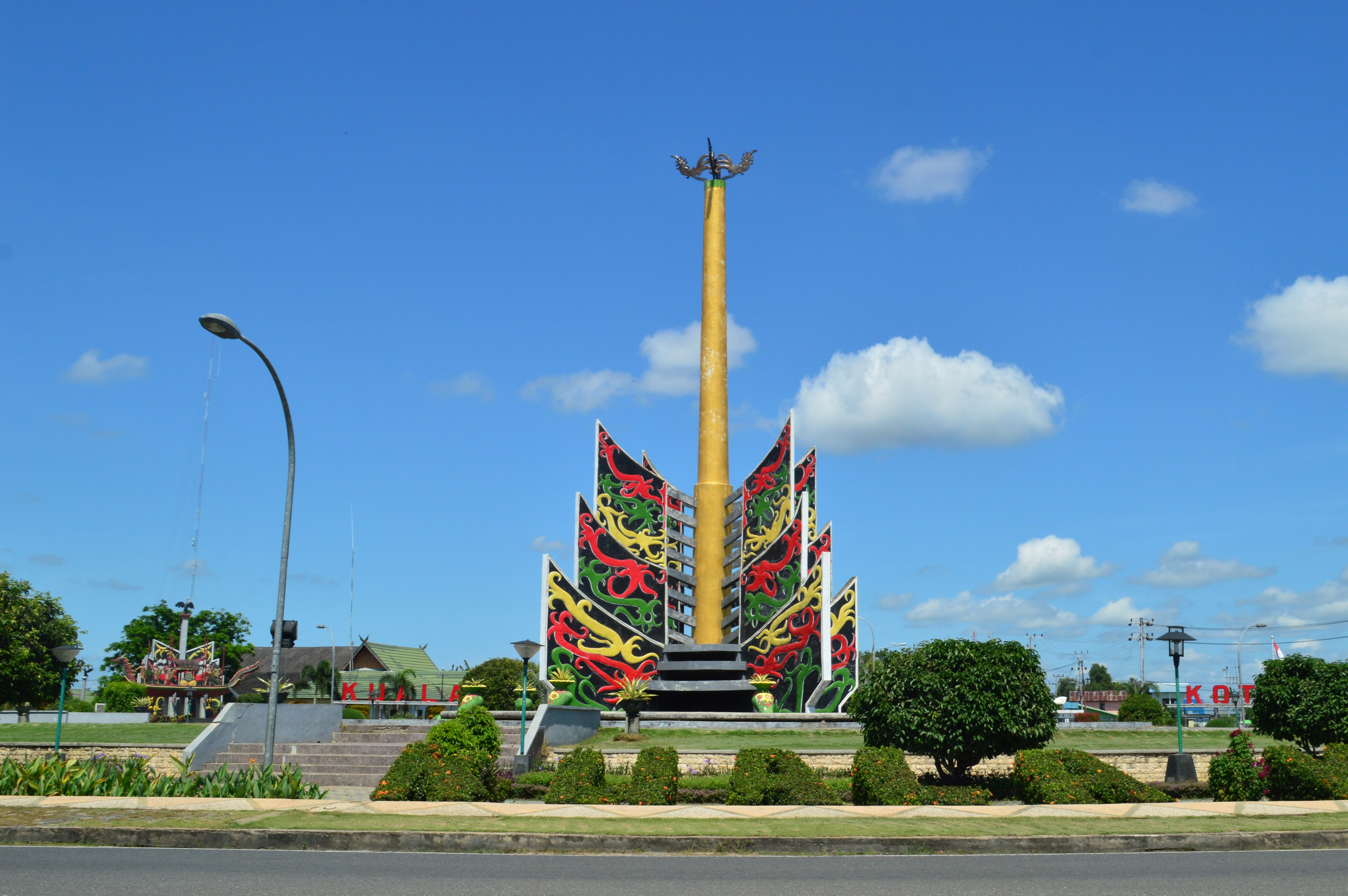
- Batang Garing (Tree of Life) Roundabout Monument in Kuala Kapuas
- Motto(s): "Tingang Menteng Panunjung Tarung"; Ngaju language: "Collective willpower to actualize dignified prosperity of the people"
- Location in Central Kalimantan, Indonesia Kuala Kapuas (Indonesia)
- Coordinates: 3°00′05″S 114°23′30″E
- Country: Indonesia
- Province: Central Kalimantan
- Regency: Kapuas Regency
- District: Selat

Area
  - Total: 45.94 km^{2} (17.74 sq mi)
- Elevation: 8 m (26 ft)

Population (2024)
  - Total: 63,550
  - Density: 1,209/km^{2} (3,130/sq mi)
- Time zone: UTC+7 (Western Indonesian Time)
- Postal code: 73513, 73514, 73515, and 73516
- Area code: +62513

Kuala Kapuas (abbreviated: KLK) is the regency seat of Kapuas Regency and also one of the major towns in Central Kalimantan. This town is at a distance of 137 km northeast of Palangka Raya City, the capital of Central Kalimantan Province. The area of this town is mainly situated within six urban subdistricts (kelurahan) and two rural villages (desa) in the district of Selat i.e. the kelurahan of Selat Barat (West Selat), Selat Dalam (Inner Selat), Selat Tengah (Central Selat), Selat Hulu (Upper Selat), Selat Hilir (Lower Selat) and Selat Utara (North Selat), and the desa of Pulau Telo (Telo Island), and Pulau Telo Baru (New Telo Island). The district's remaining two kelurahan (Murung Karamat and Panamas) form a southwesterly extension of the town; excluding these and the two desa, the total population of Kuala Kapuas as of 2019 was approximately 55,573 people, which rose to 60,832 as of 2024.

Kode Wilayah	Name of kelurahan or esa)	Pop'n Estimate mid 2024	Post code
62.03.01.1006	Murung Keramat ^{(a)}	3,740	73512
62.03.01.1007	Selat Hilir	8,522	73513
62.03.01.1008	Selat Tengah	13,722	73514
62.03.01.1009	Selat Hulu	13,630	73515
62.03.01.1010	Selat Dalam	12,785	73516
62.03.01.2011	Pulau Telo (desa)	3,655	72516
62.03.01.1023	Panamas ^{(a)}	1,649	73514
62.03.01.1022	Selat Barat	7,321	73514
62.03.01.1021	Selat Utara	4,852	73516
62.03.01.2020	Pulau Telo Baru (desa)	2,272	73516
	Totals	72,148	

Note: (a) Murung Karamat and Panamas form a southwesterly extension of the town, the majority of whose urban area is comprised within Selat Hilir, Selat Tengah, Selat Hulu, Selat Dalam, Selat Barat and Selat Utara kelurahan.

== Demographics ==
As of 2019, the total population of Kuala Kapuas was about 55,573 inhabitants, which represented 91% of the population of Selat District and 15.6% of the entire population of Kapuas Regency. The population density of this town was approximately 1,209/km^{2}, which was one of the highest among towns in Central Kalimantan. This town had 14,142 households, and its average household size was roughly 3.9 people. The sex ratio of this town was 104, which means there were 104 males for every 100 females. The town population rose to 60,832 as of 2024.

== Geography ==
Kuala Kapuas is located in the southeastern part of Central Kalimantan. This town is precisely located at 3.008572 ° S and 114.387883 ° E, which makes it the second most southern town in Central Kalimantan after Kuala Pembuang, the regency seat of Seruyan Regency. Kuala Kapuas is also located in the southern portion of the Kapuas Regency. Kuala Kapuas is located at a distance of ±130 km to the southeast of Palangka Raya City, the capital of Central Kalimantan. However, Kuala Kapuas is closer to Banjarbaru, the capital of the neighboring province of South Kalimantan, at a distance of ±88 km. The total area of this town is roughly 46 km^{2}, which makes it approximately 75% of the whole area of Selat district and 0.31% of the total area of Kapuas Regency.

Kuala Kapuas is situated at the confluence of the Kapuas and Murung Rivers. This town is also situated on the lowlands of the southeastern portion of Central Kalimantan, with the altitude being only between 1 and 15 meters above sea level. Like other towns in Central Kalimantan, Kuala Kapuas experiences a tropical rainforest climate (Af) with relatively high precipitation most of the year, constantly high humidity, and persistently warm to hot temperatures.

Climate data for Kuala Kapuas
Month	Jan	Feb	Mar	Apr	May	Jun	Jul	Aug	Sep	Oct	Nov	Dec	Year
Mean daily maximum °C (°F)	30.7 (87.3)	30.8 (87.4)	30.9 (87.6)	31 (88)	31.2 (88.2)	30.8 (87.4)	30.8 (87.4)	31.9 (89.4)	32.9 (91.2)	32.6 (90.7)	31.3 (88.3)	30.6 (87.1)	31.3 (88.3)
Mean daily minimum °C (°F)	23.8 (74.8)	23.8 (74.8)	23.9 (75.0)	24.1 (75.4)	24.2 (75.6)	23.8 (74.8)	23.4 (74.1)	23.5 (74.3)	23.9 (75.0)	24.3 (75.7)	24.2 (75.6)	23.8 (74.8)	23.9 (75.0)
Average rainfall mm (inches)	304 (12.0)	281 (11.1)	297 (11.7)	257 (10.1)	181 (7.1)	144 (5.7)	109 (4.3)	81 (3.2)	93 (3.7)	180 (7.1)	266 (10.5)	326 (12.8)	2,519 (99.3)
Average relative humidity (%)	85	83	84	81	80	77	75	71	74	78	82	87	80
Source 1: Climate-Data.org
Source 2: Indonesian Meteorological, Climatological, and Geophysical Agency
