= Sungai Durian =

Sungai Durian (Durian River) may refer to:

- Sungai Durian, Kotabaru, a district of Kotabaru Regency, South Kalimantan, Indonesia
- Sungai Durian, Patamuan, a village in the district of Patamuan, Padang Pariaman Regency, West Sumatra, Indonesia
- Sungai Durian, Payakumbuh, a village in the district of Lamposi Tigo Nagari, Payakumbuh, West Sumatra, Indonesia
- Sungai Durian, Perak, a village in the Hilir Perak District, Perak, Malaysia
- Sungai Durian, Solok, a village in the district of IX Koto Sungai Lasi, Solok Regency, West Sumatra, Indonesia
- Sungai Durian, Tabalong, a village in the district of Banua Lawas, Tabalong Regency, South Kalimantan, Indonesia
