= Astambul =

- District
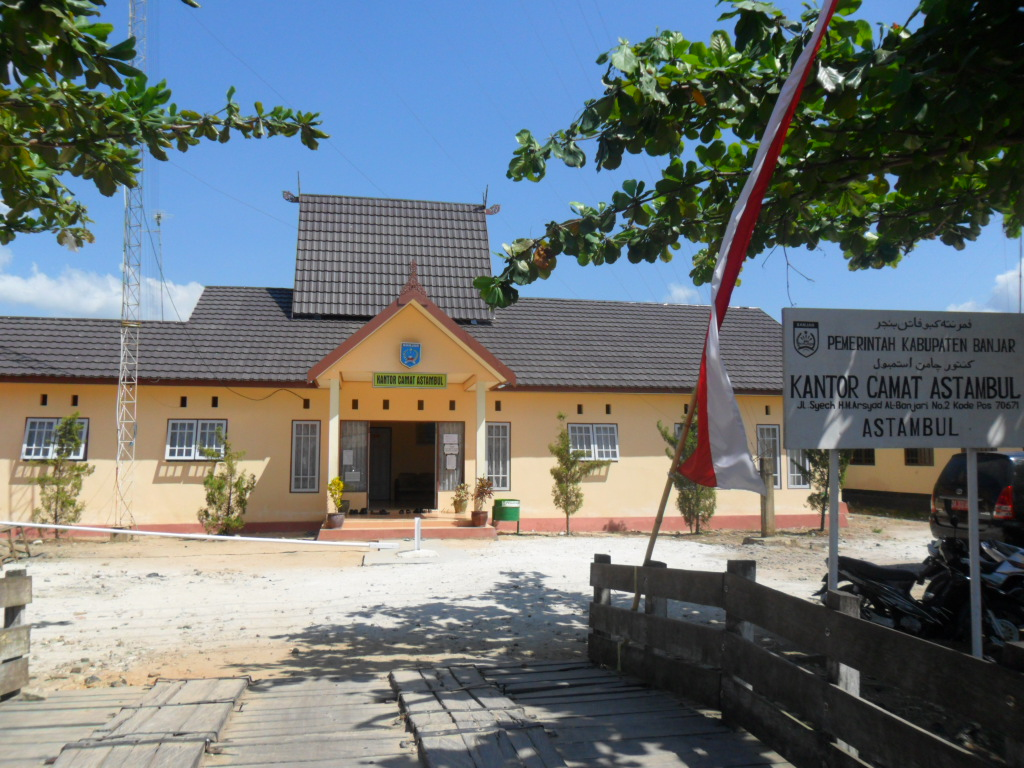
- Astambul District office

- Location within South Kalimantan Location within Kalimantan Location within Indonesia
- Coordinates: 3°22′S 114°53′E
- Country: Indonesia
- Province: South Kalimantan
- Regency: Banjar
- District seat: Astambul

Area
  - Total: 216.50 km^{2} (83.59 sq mi)

Population (2018)
  - Total: 36.720
  - Density: 0.16961/km^{2} (0.43928/sq mi)

Astambul is a district in Banjar Regency, South Kalimantan, Indonesia. The district covers an area of 216.50 km^{2}, and had a population of 36.720 at the 2018 census.

== History ==
On 23 August 1995, the eastern portion of the district was split off to form Mataraman district.

== Governance ==
=== Villages ===
Astambul District consists of 22 villages (desa):

- Pingaran Ilir
- Jati Baru
- Pasar Jati
- Danau Salak
- Tambak Danau
- Kaliukan
- Sungai Alat
- Pingaran Ulu
- Astambul Kota
- Astambul Seberang
- Sungai Tuan Ulu
- Banua Anyar Sungai Tuan
- Kelampaian Ilir
- Kelampaian Ulu
- Limamar
- Lok Gabang
- Pematang Hambawang
- Kelampaian Tengah
- Tambangan
- Banua Anyar Danau Salak
- Sungai Tuan Ilir
- Munggu Raya
