= Telaga Langsat =

- District
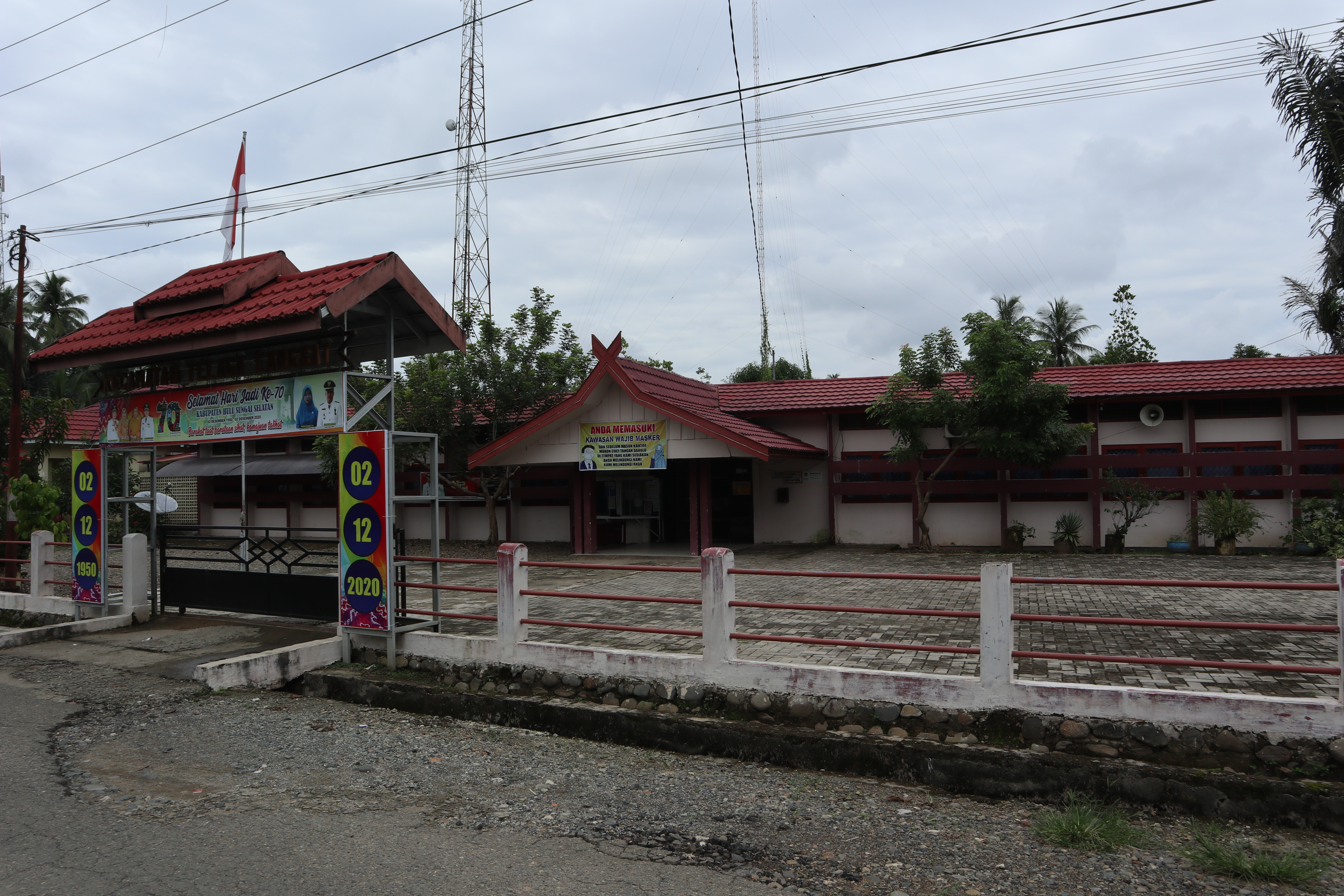
- Telaga Langsat District Office
- Interactive map of Telaga Langsat
- Location within South Kalimantan Location within Kalimantan Location within Indonesia
- Coordinates: 2°44′8.78302″S 115°20′9.04096″E
- Country: Indonesia
- Province: South Kalimantan
- Regency: South Hulu Sungai
- District seat: Mandala

Area
  - Total: 58.08 km^{2} (22.42 sq mi)

Population (2020)
  - Total: 10,199
  - Density: 175.6/km^{2} (454.8/sq mi)

Telaga Langsat is a district in South Hulu Sungai Regency, South Kalimantan, Indonesia. In 2020, it was inhabited by 10,199 people, and had a total area of 58.08 km^{2}.

== Geography ==
Telaga Langsat consists of eleven villages (desa):

- Lok Binuang
- Telaga Langsat
- Mandala
- Ambutun
- Hamak
- East Hamak
- North Hamak
- East Pakuan
- Gumbil
- Longawang
- Pandulangan
