= Durian River =

Durian River may refer to:

- Ci Durian, a river in western Java, Indonesia
- Sungai Durian (disambiguation), various locations in Indonesia and Malaysia
