= Tanjung, Tabalong =

Tanjung
- District
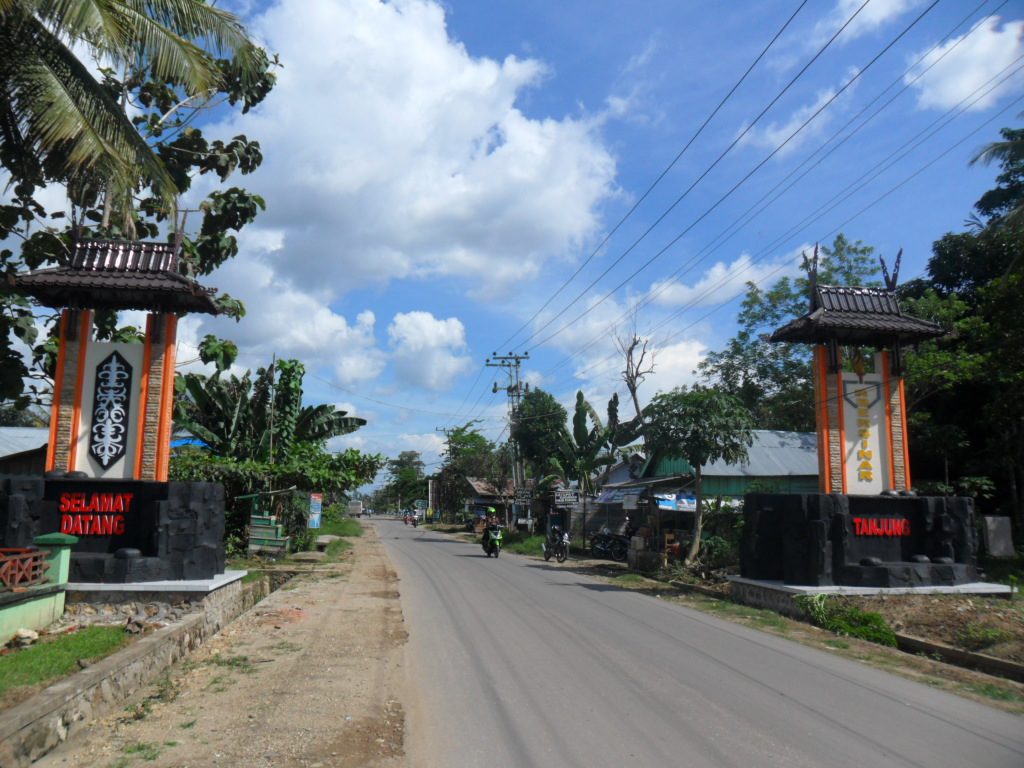
- Tanjung Entrance Gate

- Location within Indonesia
- Coordinates: 2°09′54″S 115°22′58″E
- Country: Indonesia
- Province: South Kalimantan
- Regency: Tabalong
- Divisions: 4 urban villages (kelurahan) and 11 rural villages (desa)

Government
  - Head: Drs. H.M. Rajuddin

Area
  - Total: 191.69 km^{2} (74.01 sq mi)

Population (2022)
  - Total: 36,867
  - Density: 192.33/km^{2} (498.12/sq mi)
- Time zone: UTC+8 (WITA)
- Area code: +62 526
- Website: www.tabalongkab.go.id

Tanjung, or also commonly known as Tanjung Tabalong, is a town and district, which forms the administrative centre of Tabalong Regency in the Indonesian province of South Kalimantan.

== Etymology and names ==
The name of Tanjung Tabalong originated from local stories told from generations. The name came from a story about jungle explorers that stepped on Tataba thorns while searching for open areas to establish a farm. They screamed and asked for help, which in the local Banjar language is Tahalulung which eventually became the name of the city, Tabalong.

== History ==
- Kingdom of Tanjungpuri was founded in Tanjung by the old Malay people in 520 AD.
- The Kingdom of Netherlands gradually established control in the area starting in the early 19th century. Southern Borneo including Tanjung was officially made into a Dutch protectorate in 1891.
- Empire of Japan conquered the town in 1942 after advancing from Eastern Borneo.
- During the Second Dutch Aggression, local militias launched the Tanjung City General Attack in 1949.

== Geography ==
Tanjung district is located on a relatively flat plain in the northern region of South Kalimantan. It borders Haruai, Murung Pudak and Tanta districts in the east, Bintang Ara district in the north, Kelua district in the south and Central Kalimantan province in the west.

== Government ==
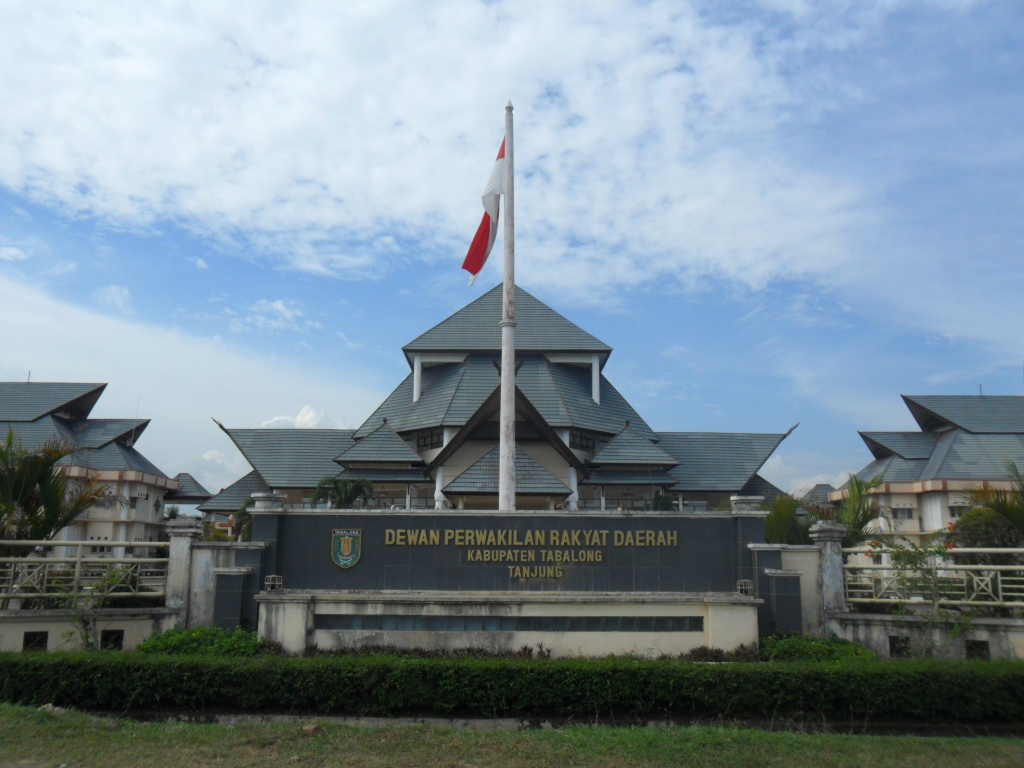
District Legislative Council building of Tabalong

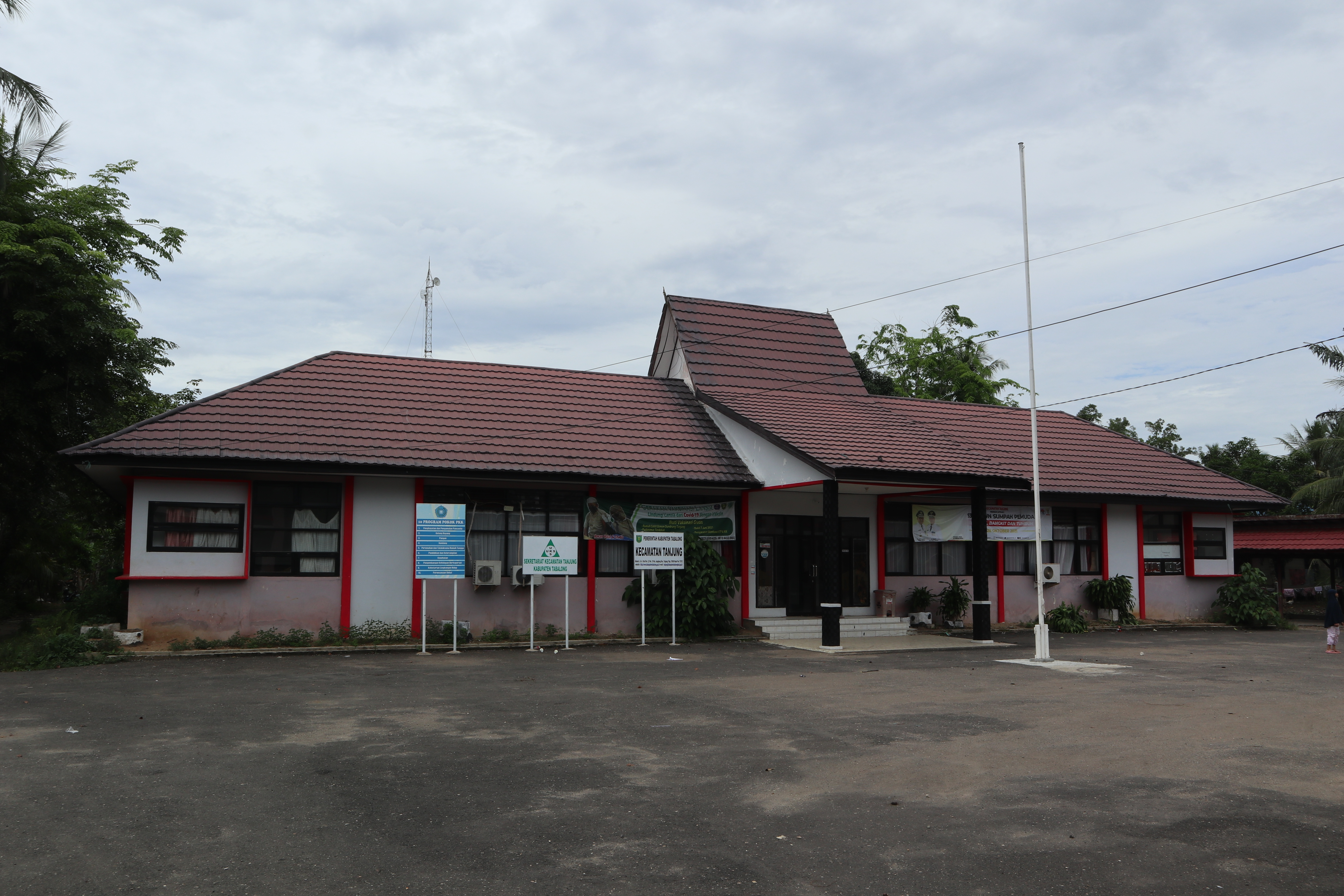
Tanjung subdistrict office

Tanjung is one of the twelve districts (kecamatan) of Tabalong Regency. The other eleven districts are Banua Lawas, Bintang Ara, Haruai, Jaro, Kelua, Muara Harus, Muara Uya, Murung Pudak, Pugaan, Tanta and Upau.

As the administrative centre of Tabalong Regency, Tanjung houses some of the important government institutions, including the Legislative Council of Tabalong and the office of the Tabalong Regent.

Tanjung district is divided into 15 administrative divisions, which consist of 4 urban villages (kelurahan) and 11 rural villages (desa).

=== Urban villages ===
- Agung
- Hikun
- Jangkung
- Tanjung

=== Villages ===
- Banyu Tajun
- Garunggung
- Juai
- Kambitin
- Kambitin Raya
- Kitang
- Mahe Seberang
- Pamarangan Kiwa
- Puain Kiwa
- Sungai Pimping
- Wayau

== Economy ==
=== Oil mining ===
Crude oil was discovered in the region in 1898. Most of the oilfields are now being operated by Pertamina.

=== Coal mining ===
Coal mining plays a major role in the region's economy. The coal mines in Tanjung are currently operated by Adaro Energy. The mining area covers the area of both Tabalong and neighboring Balangan. Adaro is currently employing 12,110 workers, subsidiaries and contractors within the company as of 2012.

== Demographics ==
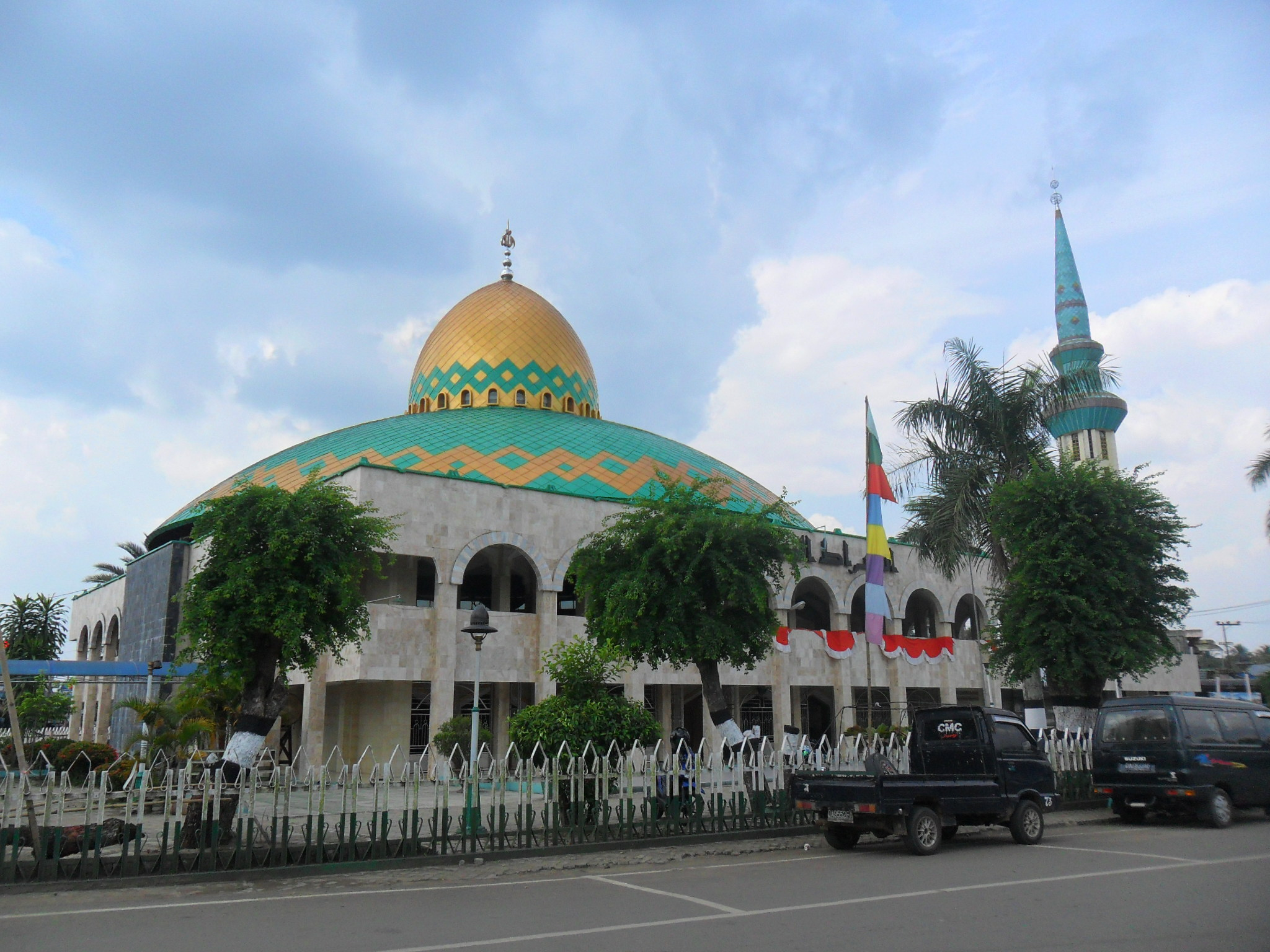
Agung Ash-Shiratal Mustaqim Mosque

As of 2010, the recorded population of Tanjung is around 32,458 with 16,405 male population, slightly bigger than the female population. The population density is around 110 people per square kilometer.

== Places of interest ==
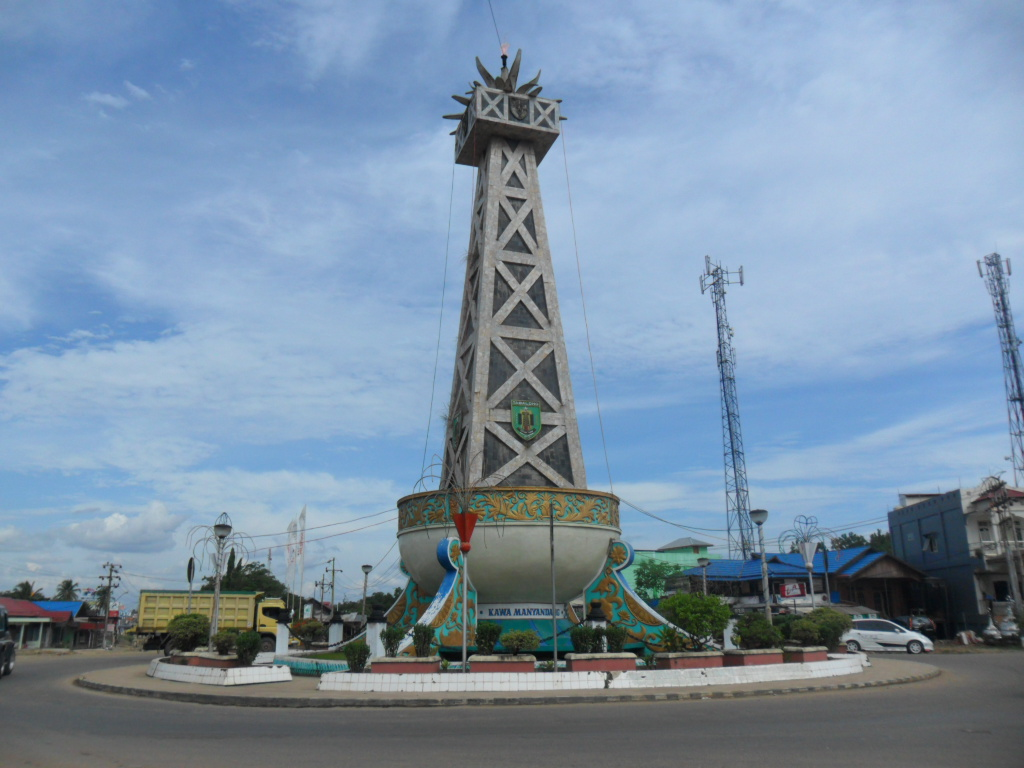
Tanjung Puri Torch Tower

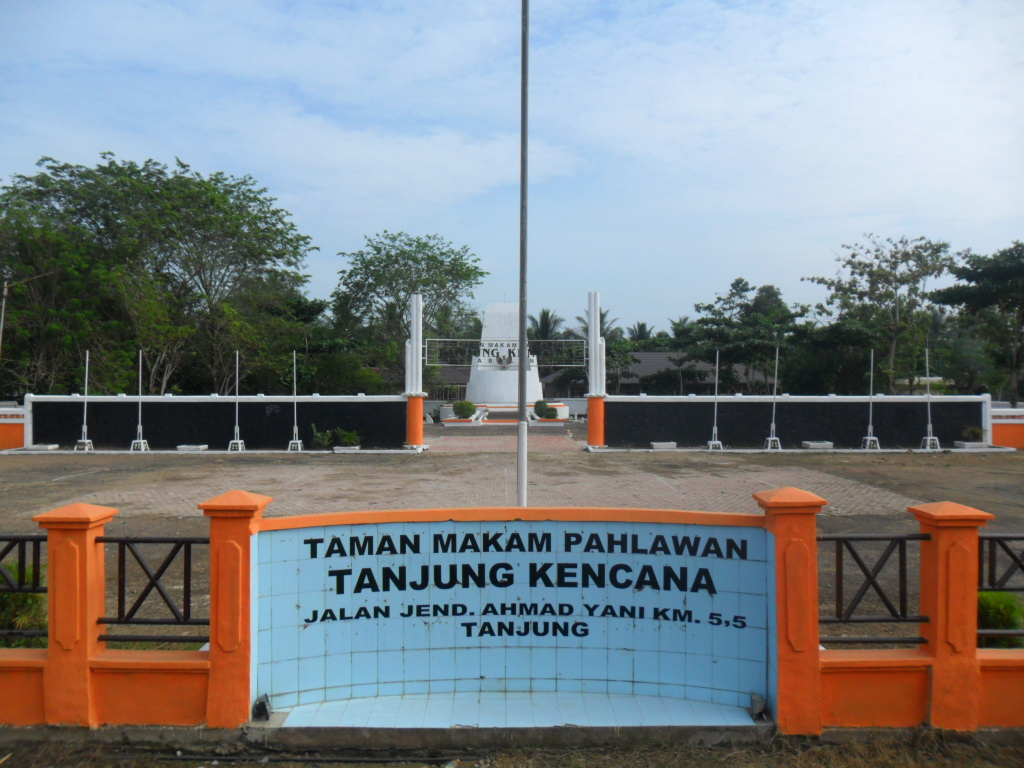
Tanjung Kencana National Hero Memorial Park

Tanjung has a few monuments and place of interest as following:

- Bauntung Mall Market
- People's Stage
- Tanjung City Park
- Tanjung Grand Mosque
- Tanjung History Memorial Monument
- Tanjung Kencana National Hero Memorial Park
- Tanjung Puri Torch Tower etc.

As of 2012, the government of Tanjung is planning to build a five-hectare integrated entertainment and sport area Tanjung City Center (TCC) which consists of theater, futsal field, basketball field, water park, dry park, open stage and art market.

== Sports ==
Major sporting venues in the city and surrounding areas include the Mustika Sport Center, Tanjung Golf Field, Pembataan Tanjung Sport Complex etc.

== Transportation ==
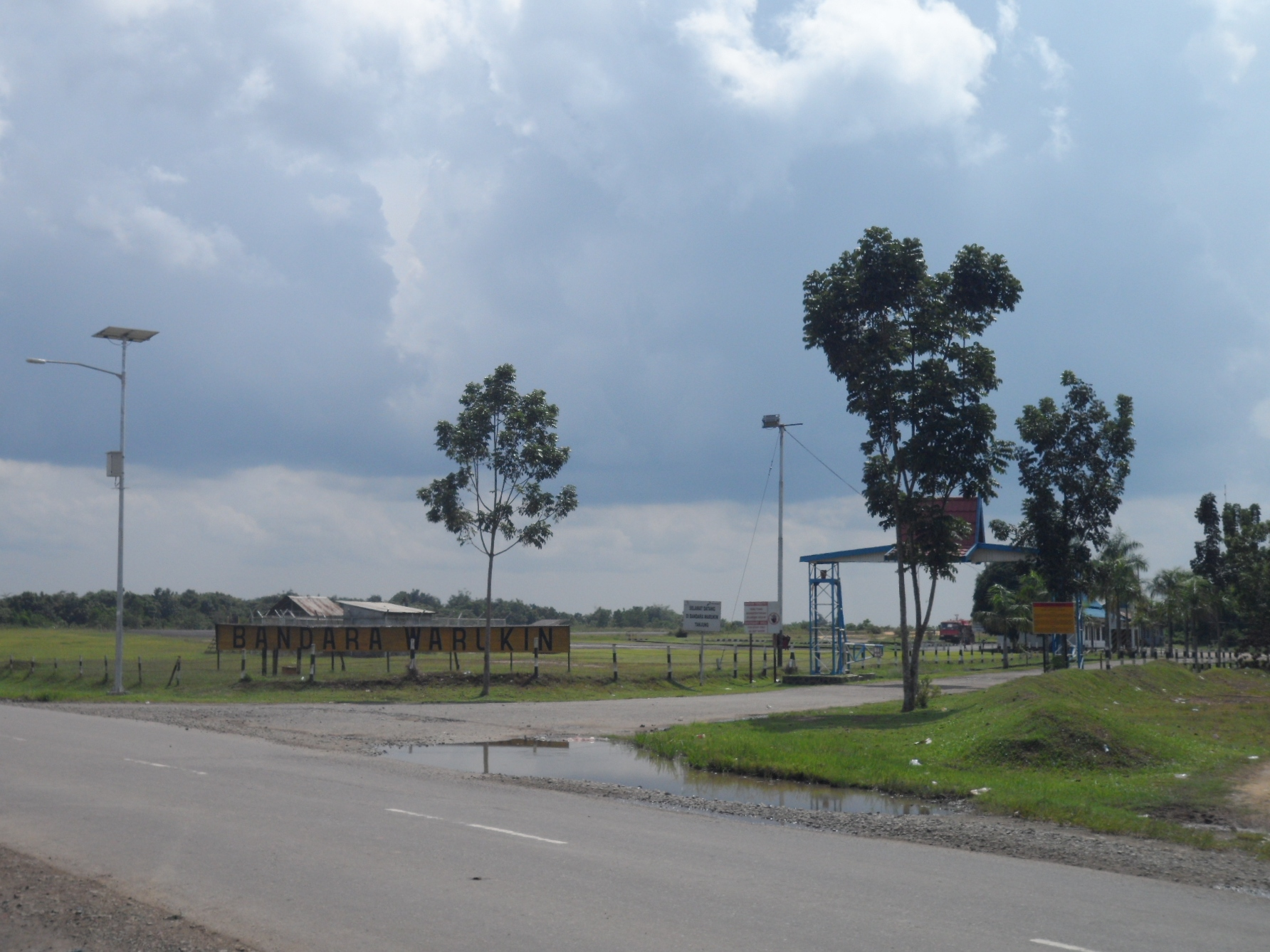
Warukin Airport

=== Roads ===
Tanjung is accessible via road connected from Banjarmasin, the capital of the South Kalimantan province. Cars and motorbikes are the main form of transportation in the region.

=== Air ===
Tanjung is accessible via air through the region's domestic airport, the Warukin Airport (IATA: TJG). The airport is located on the neighboring Tanta subdistrict. The only current continuous operating airline in the airport is Airfast Indonesia serving Tanjung to Banjarmasin.

Airlines	Destinations
Airfast Indonesia	Banjarmasin

=== Public Transit ===
As of 2012, Tanjung has a public bus terminal called the Mabuun Terminal. This bus terminal serves several destinations of city in South Kalimantan and East Kalimantan such as Banjarmasin, Balikpapan, Barabai etc. However, with the future plan of constructing the TCC, Mabuun Terminal will be relocated from its current place to a new one.

== Education ==
Tanjung is the home to the newly built Banjarmasin State Polytechnic which was opened in 2011.

== See also ==
- South Kalimantan
