= Aranio =

- District
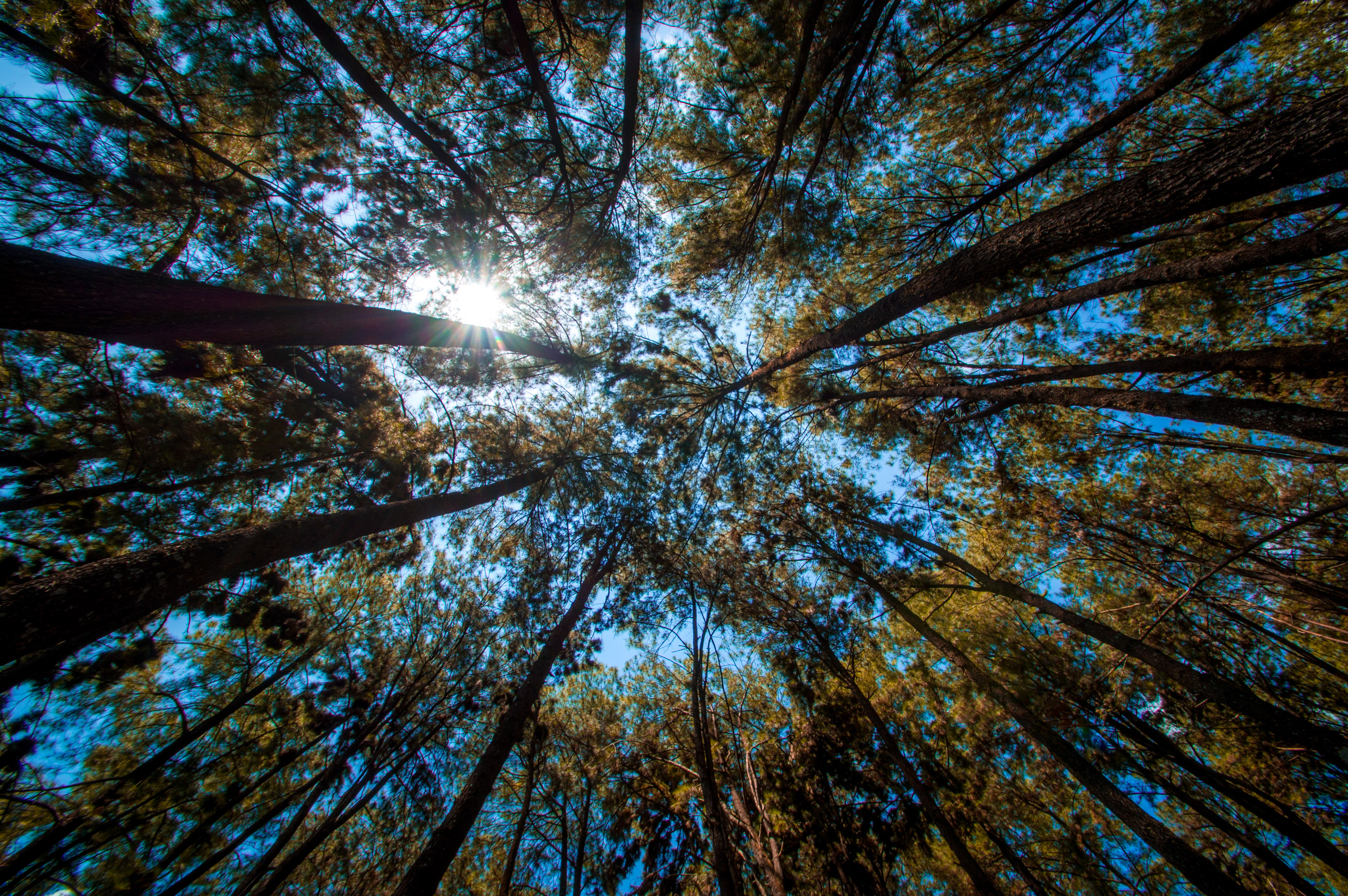
- Pine trees in Riam Kanan Reservoir
- Interactive map of Aranio
- Location within South Kalimantan Location within Kalimantan Location within Indonesia
- Coordinates: 3°30′33″S 114°59′37″E
- Country: Indonesia
- Province: South Kalimantan
- Regency: Banjar
- Established: 18 September 1986
- District seat: Aranio

Area
  - Total: 1,166.35 km^{2} (450.33 sq mi)

Population (2023)
  - Total: 9,377
  - Density: 8.040/km^{2} (20.82/sq mi)
- Time zone: UTC+08:00 (ICT)
- Postal code: 70671
- Regional code: 63.03.11

Aranio is a district in Banjar Regency, South Kalimantan Province, Indonesia. The district covers an area of 1,166.35 km^{2}, and had a population of 9,377 at the 2023 estimate.

== History ==
Aranio was established on 18 September 1986, after being split off from the eastern part of Karang Intan district.

== Geography ==
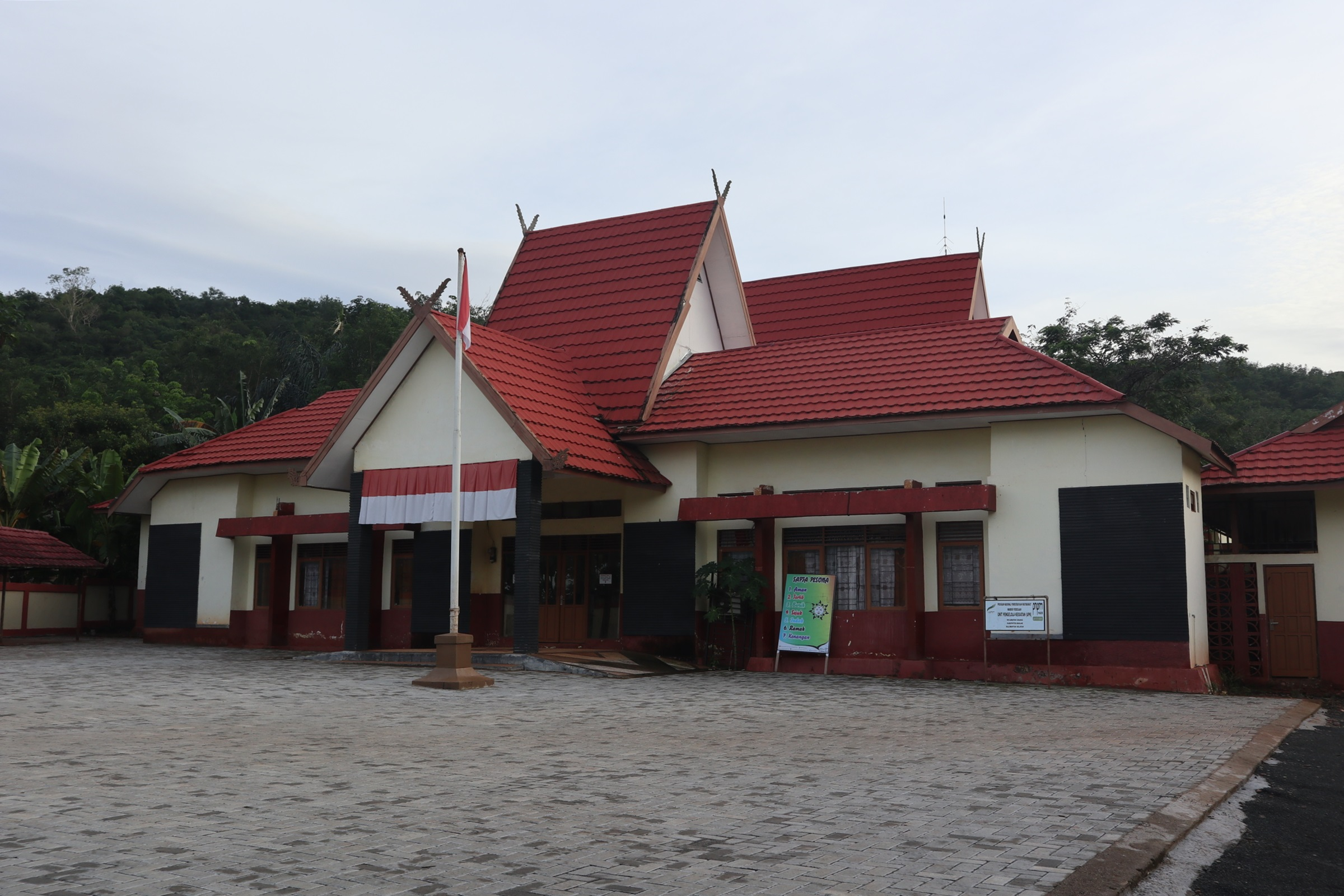
Aranio District office

Aranio consists of twelve village (desa):

- Aranio
- Artain
- Apuai
- Belangian
- Benua Riam
- Bunglai
- Kalaan
- Pa'au
- Rantau Balai
- Rantau Bujur
- Tiwingan Baru
- Tiwingan Lama
