= Heritage Mosque of Banua Lawas =

Mosque in Tabalong, South Kalimantan, Indonesia

Heritage Mosque of Banua Lawas Masjid Pusaka Banua Lawas
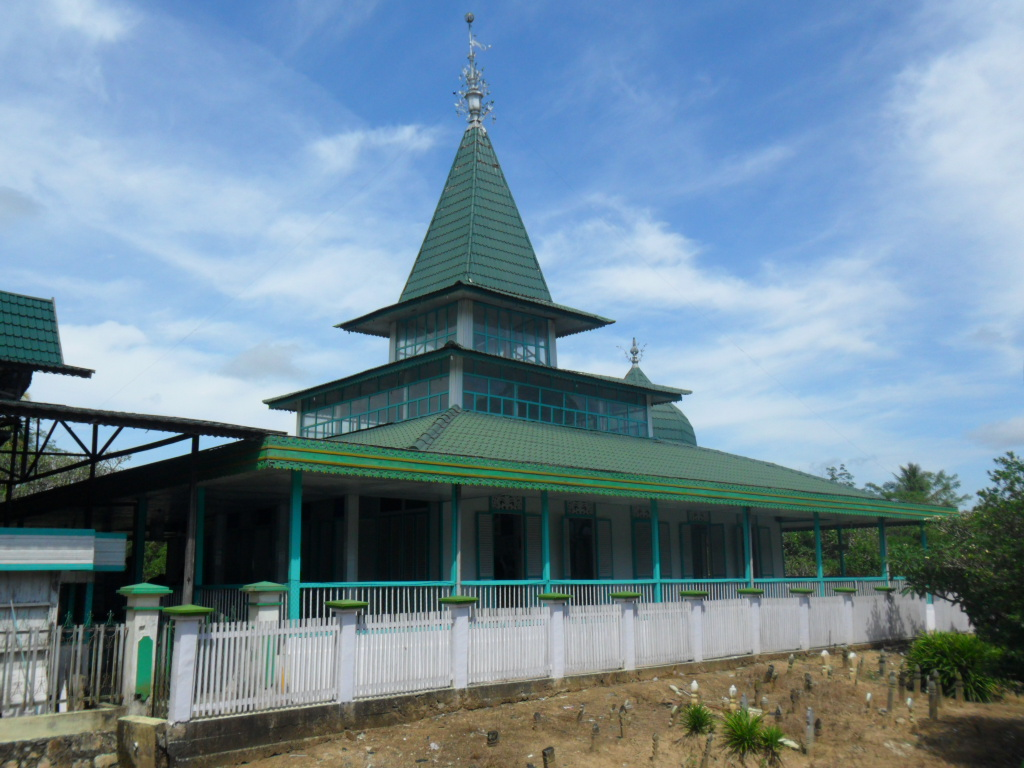

Religion
- Affiliation: Islam
- Branch/tradition: Sunni
- Region: Southeast Asia
- Status: Active

Location
- Location: Banua Lawas, Tabalong Regency, South Kalimantan, Indonesia

Architecture
- Type: Mosque
- Style: Banjar
- Completed: 1625

The Heritage Mosque of Banua Lawas (Indonesian: Masjid Pusaka Banua Lawas) is an old mosque in Banua Lawas, Tabalong Regency, South Kalimantan. It is one of the oldest mosques in Indonesia. The mosque is also known as Masjid Pasar Arba (Wednesday Market Mosque) as there are more pilgrims visiting on Wednesday as it coincides with market day at Banua Lawas. As the oldest mosque in Tabalong regency, in addition to being a place of worship, it is also a milestone and the historical evidence of acceptance of Islam among the Ma'anyan Dayak people in the area.

This mosque is crowded with visitors and pilgrims of Muslims in the area including from Kaltim. In addition, it is still storing the original 110 cm long beduk, a traditional Indonesian drum. The mosque was built in 1625, which was initiated by Khatib Dayan and his brother Sultan Abdurrahman (from the Banjar sultanate based in Banjarmasin). Khatib Dayan assisted by Dayak community leaders, namely Datu Ranggana, Datu Kartamina, Datu Saripanji, Langlang Buana, Taruntung Manau, Timba Sagara, Sampit Screen, Pambalah Batung and Garuntung Waluh.

== Legacy ==
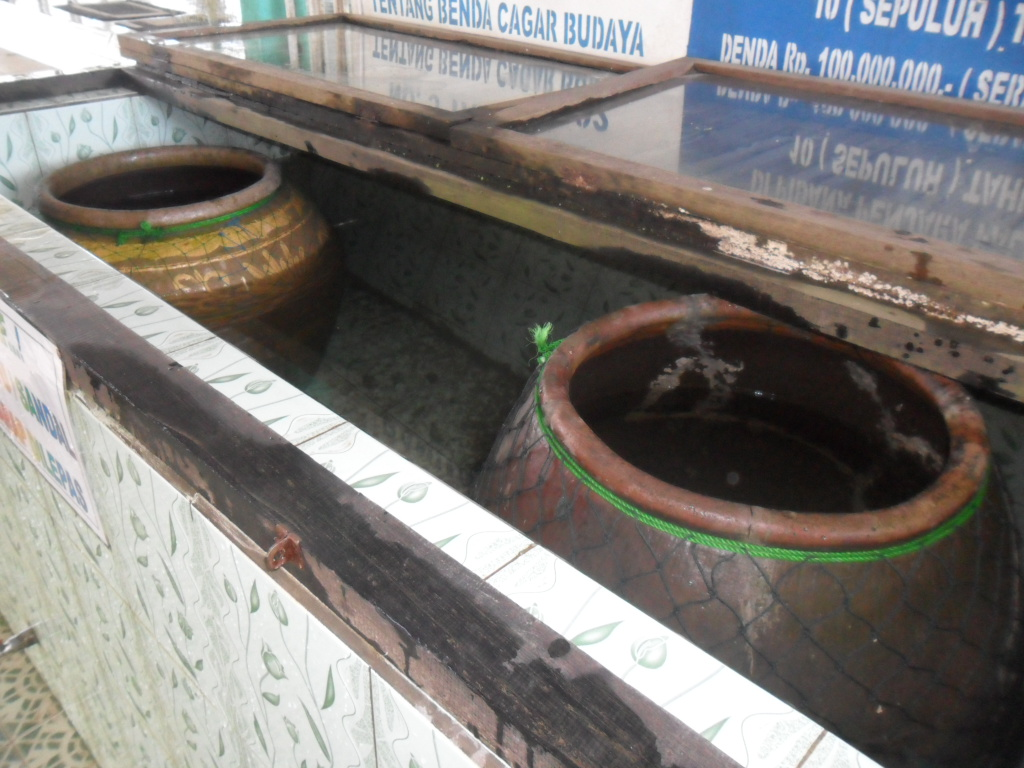
Tajau reservoir in the Banua Lawas mosque.

Tajau, a jar of water reservoir used by the Dayak people to bathe the newborn child, is one of the relics contained in the Heritage Mosque. On the front porch of the mosque, there are two tajaus, and despite being basked in the sun, those tajaus whose age reaches 400 years haven't changed its color. The pilgrims who get there often bring home the water in the tajau because it is believed by the residents that they will earn them blessings by drinking or using the water for bathing. People visit for the pilgrimage as their religious ritual, and in addition to praying, circumcision and reading of surah Ya Sin, people also claim to pay vows, because it is believed that their wish will be granted. There are also historical cemeteries of local residents attached to the mosque, and notably there is the tomb of a Banjar fighter named Penghulu Rashid.

== History ==
A version of history is found in the oral tradition that developed in Banua Lawas and surrounding areas which states that at the site of the mosque, a kind of pesanggrahan or place of worship of Kaharingan belief of Ma'anyan people in a simple form was built long before Hinduism and Islam were established. The place of worship was considered sacred, and its religious benefits held great importance for Maanyan people which at the time a lot of them were settled in the area. They then named the location of the place of worship as Banua Lawas or Banua Usang. It is considered possible that the activities of society, the emergence, and the development of other areas around it originated from Banua Lawas. It is also considered possible that a major event had occurred which forced them to leave their homeland and settle or build a new settlement, and eventually they called the abandoned village as Banua Lawas. The oral tradition that develops in Banua Lawas mentions that some Maanyan people stepped aside because they were unwilling to accept Islam as their religion. But the other possibility is related to the fleeing immigrants from Java who came due to political unrest in their native region and established a new empire on the island of Hujung Tanah called Dipa Country.

== Gallery ==
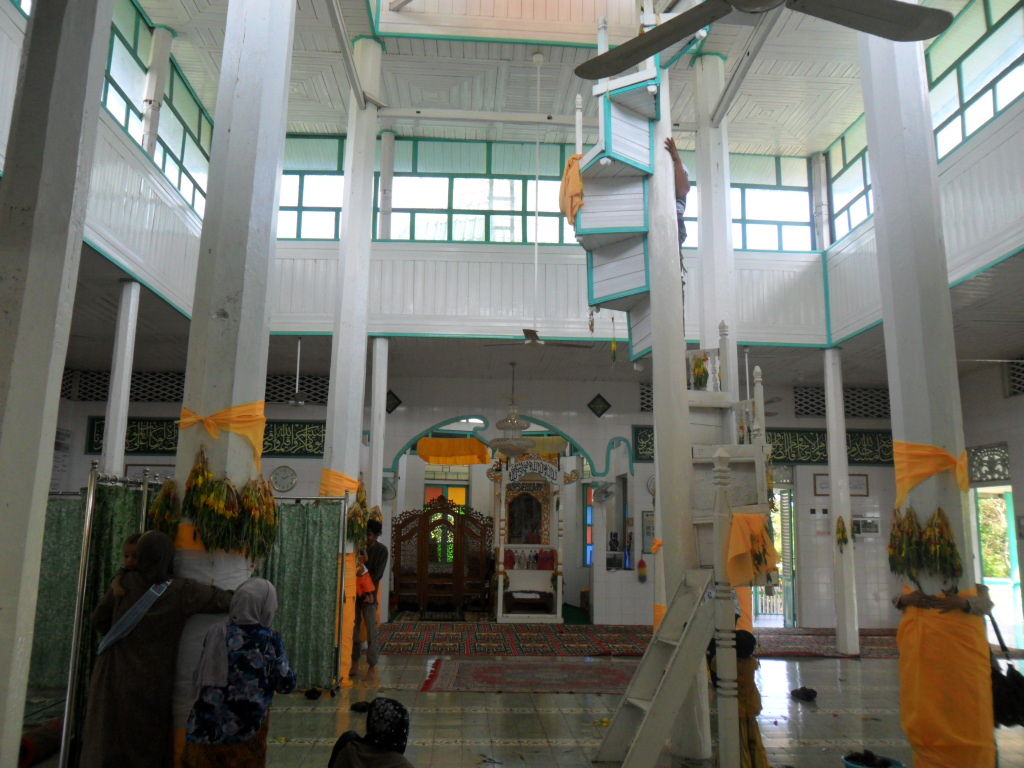
Interior

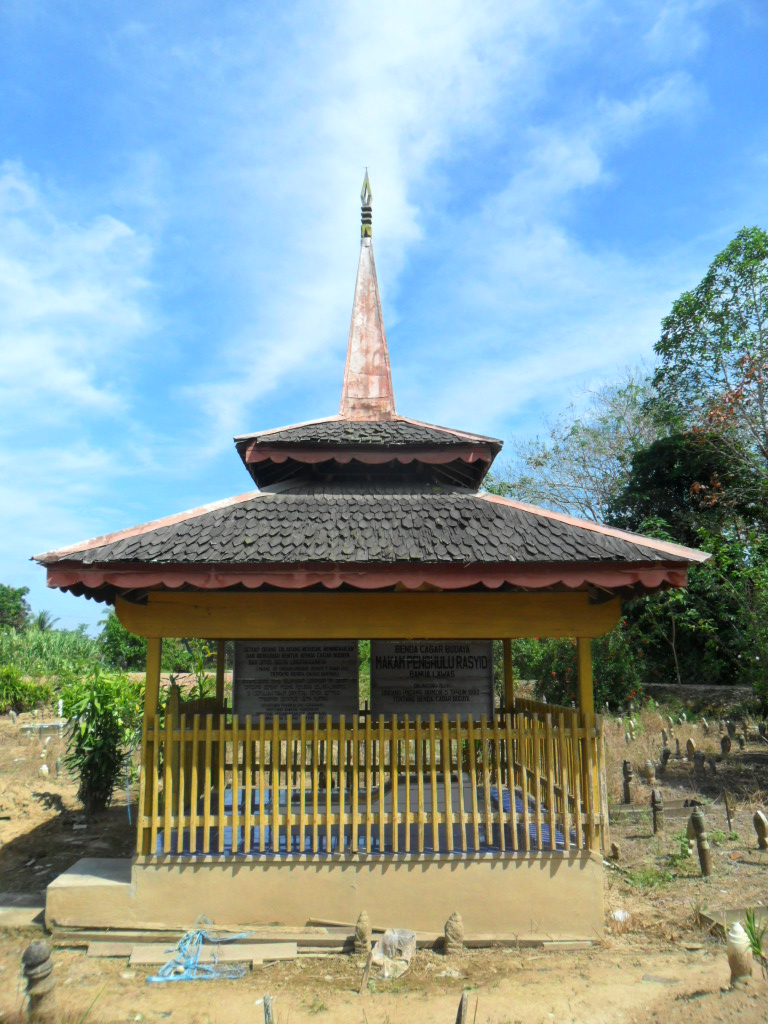
The tomb of Penghulu Rashyd overview

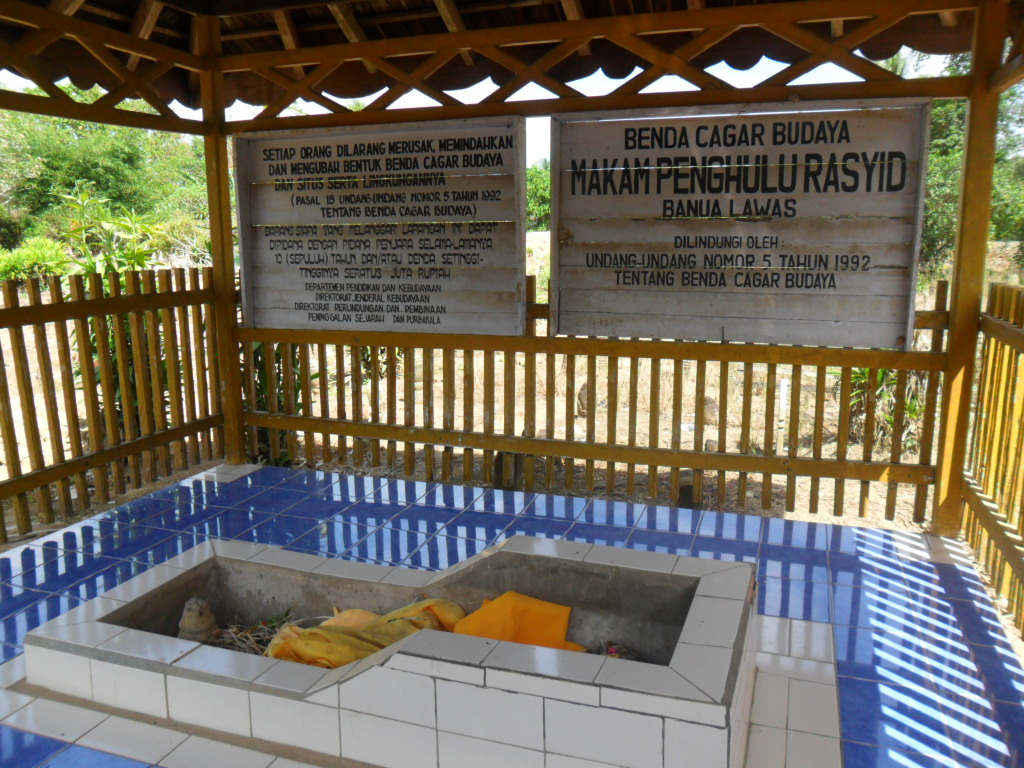
The tomb of Penghulu Rashyd

== See also ==
- Islamic architecture
- List of mosques in Indonesia
- Indonesian architecture
