= Sungai Durian, Tabalong =

Sungai Durian
- Village
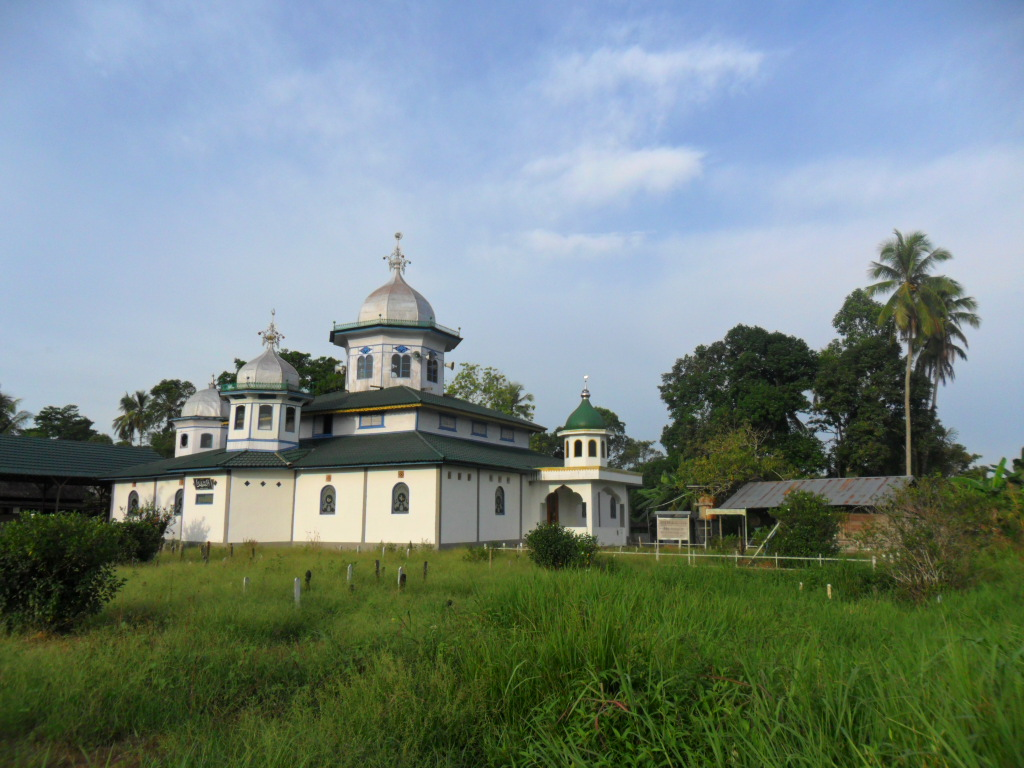
- Jami Asy-Syuhada Mosque

- Location within Indonesia
- Coordinates: 2.348916°S 115.279808°E
- Country: Indonesia
- Province: South Kalimantan
- Regency: Tabalong
- District: Banua Lawas

Population (2010)
  - Total: 837
- Postal code: 72167

Sungai Durian, or "Durian River", also called Sei Durian is a village in the district of Banua Lawas, Tabalong Regency in the province of South Kalimantan, Indonesia. The village had 837 inhabitants as of the 2010 census.

== Sources ==
- Data Kecamatan & Kelurahan: Kabupaten Tabalong terdiri dari 12 Kecamatan, 9 Kelurahan, dan 122 Desa (in Indonesian), Tabalong Regency
- Population of Indonesia by Village: Result of 2010 Population Census (PDF), Central Bureau of Statistics (BPS - Statistics Indonesia), archived from the original (PDF) on 2015-02-07
