= Sungai Durian, Payakumbuh =

Sungai Durian
- Village
- Location within Indonesia
- Coordinates: 0.199300°S 100.608709°E
- Country: Indonesia
- Province: West Sumatra
- Municipality: Payakumbuh
- District: Lamposi Tigo Nagari

Population (2010)
  - Total: 2,100
- Postal code: 26219

Sungai Durian, or "Durian River", is a village in the district of Lamposi Tigo Nagari, Payakumbuh, in the province of West Sumatra, Indonesia. The village had 2,100 inhabitants as of the 2010 census.

In December 2016 Payakumbuh mayor Riza Falepi and Member of Parliament Lampasi Syafrizal visited the village to inspect land where a football stadium was planned, with construction to start in 2018.

== Sources ==
- "Goro di Sungai Durian, Riza Falepi Jajaki Peluang Lahan untuk Stadion Sepakbola", Warta Payakumbuh (in Indonesian), 28 December 2016
- "Kode Pos Desa Sei/Sungai Durian, Kecamatan Lamposi Tigo Nagari, Kota Payakumbuh", Kumpulanilmu (in Indonesian)
- Population of Indonesia by Village: Result of 2010 Population Census (PDF), Central Bureau of Statistics (BPS - Statistics Indonesia), archived from the original (PDF) on 2015-02-07
