= Sungai Durian, Patamuan =

Sungai Durian
- Village
- Location within Indonesia
- Coordinates: 0.562878°S 100.249326°E
- Country: Indonesia
- Province: West Sumatra
- Regency: Padang Pariaman
- District: Patamuan

Area
  - Total: 11.84 km^{2} (4.57 sq mi)

Population (2010)
  - Total: 4,635
  - Density: 391.5/km^{2} (1,014/sq mi)
- Website: sungaidurian.com

Sungai Durian, or "Durian River", is a village in the district of Patamuan, Padang Pariaman Regency, in the province of West Sumatra, Indonesia.

== Location ==
The village of Sungai Durian is at an altitude of 25 to 500 metres (82 to 1,640 ft) above sea level. It has an area of 11.84 square kilometres (4.57 sq mi). It is bounded to the north by the village of Tandikat, to the west by the villages of Koto Baru and Batu Kalang, to the south by the village of Sungai Sariak to the east by the villages of Sungai Asam and Sicincin. There are two mosques.

== Demographics ==
The village had 4,635 inhabitants as of the 2010 census. Demographics were:

| Population male | 2,377 |
| Population female | 2,489 |
| Number of households | 1,120 |
| Population density | 411 people / Km2 |

== Sources ==
- Gambaran Umum Nagari Sungai Durian (in Indonesian), Nagari Sungai Durian
- Population of Indonesia by Village: Result of 2010 Population Census (PDF), Central Bureau of Statistics (BPS - Statistics Indonesia), archived from the original (PDF) on 2015-02-07
