= Banua Lawas =

- district
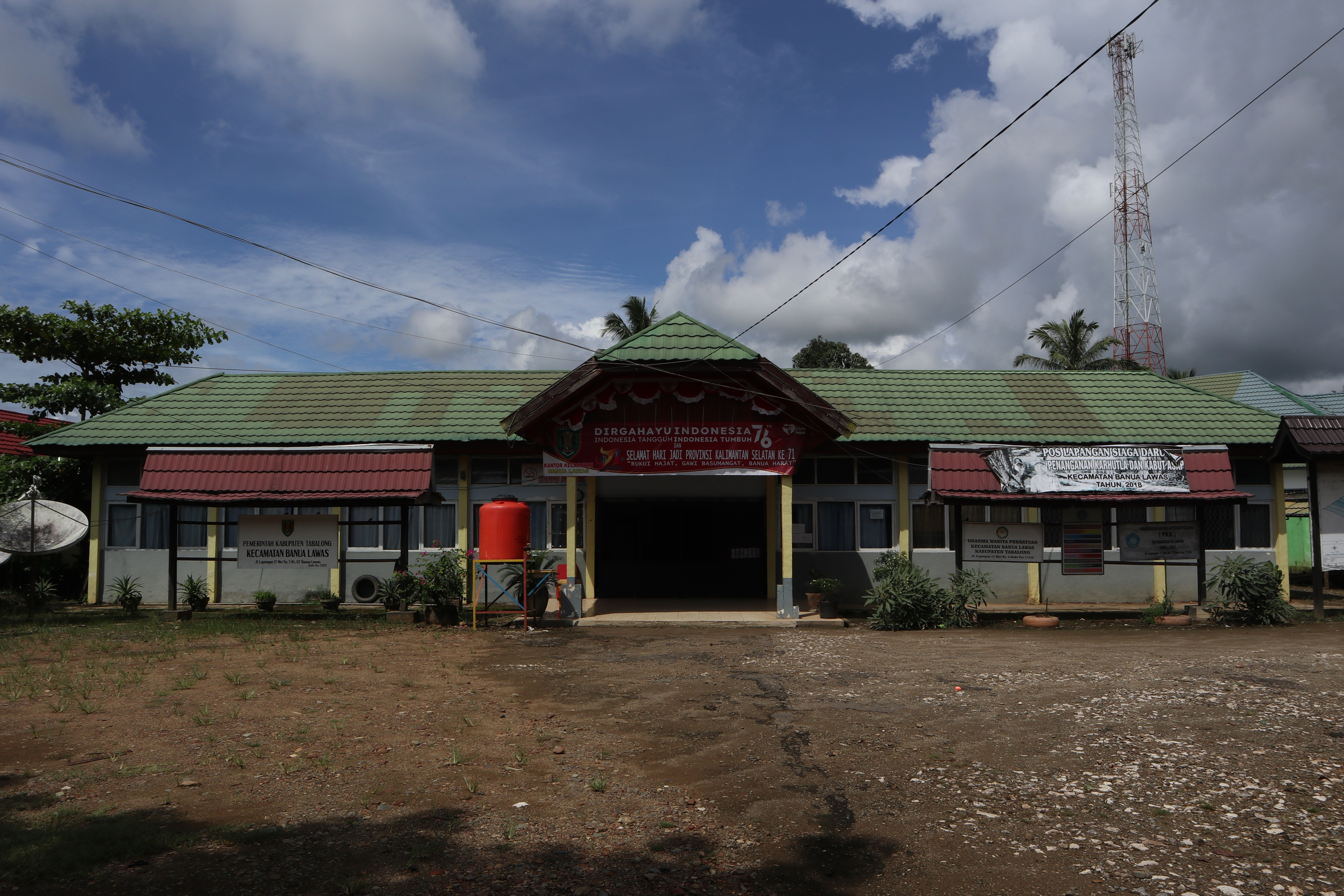
- District office of Banua Lawas
- Interactive map of Banua Lawas
- Country: Indonesia
- State: South Kalimantan
- Region: Tabalong

Area
  - Total: 150.85 km^{2} (58.24 sq mi)

Population (mid 2018)
  - Total: 20,217
  - Density: 134.02/km^{2} (347.11/sq mi)

Banua Lawas is a district in Tabalong Regency, South Kalimantan Province, Indonesia. The majority of population in this district is Banjar people whose belief is Islam.

== Demography ==
According to the 2010 Census, population of this district was 17,897, with male population of 8,692 and female population of 9,295, and gender ratio of 94. Population density was 122 per square kilometers. The latest official estimate (as at mid 2018) is 20,217.

== Sites of interest ==
- Cultivation of keramba fish
- Heritage Mosque of Banua Lawas
- The tomb of Penghulu Rasyid
- The tomb of a hero Sungai Durian
- Lake Undan

== Gallery ==
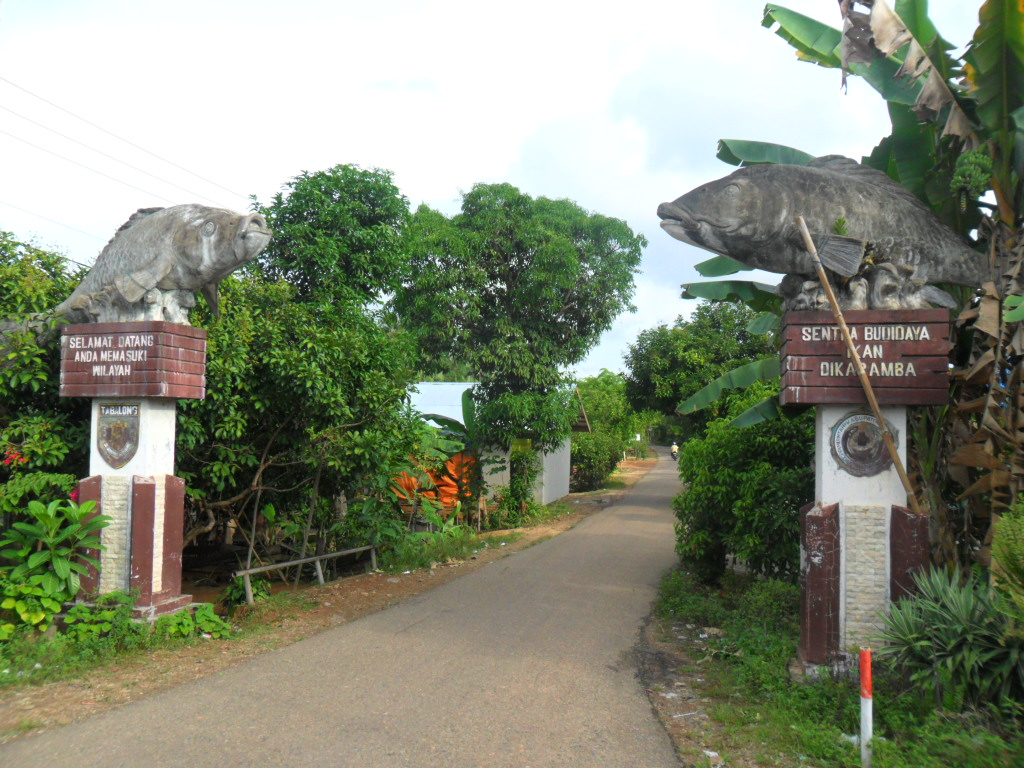
Entrance gate of keramba fish cultivation site.

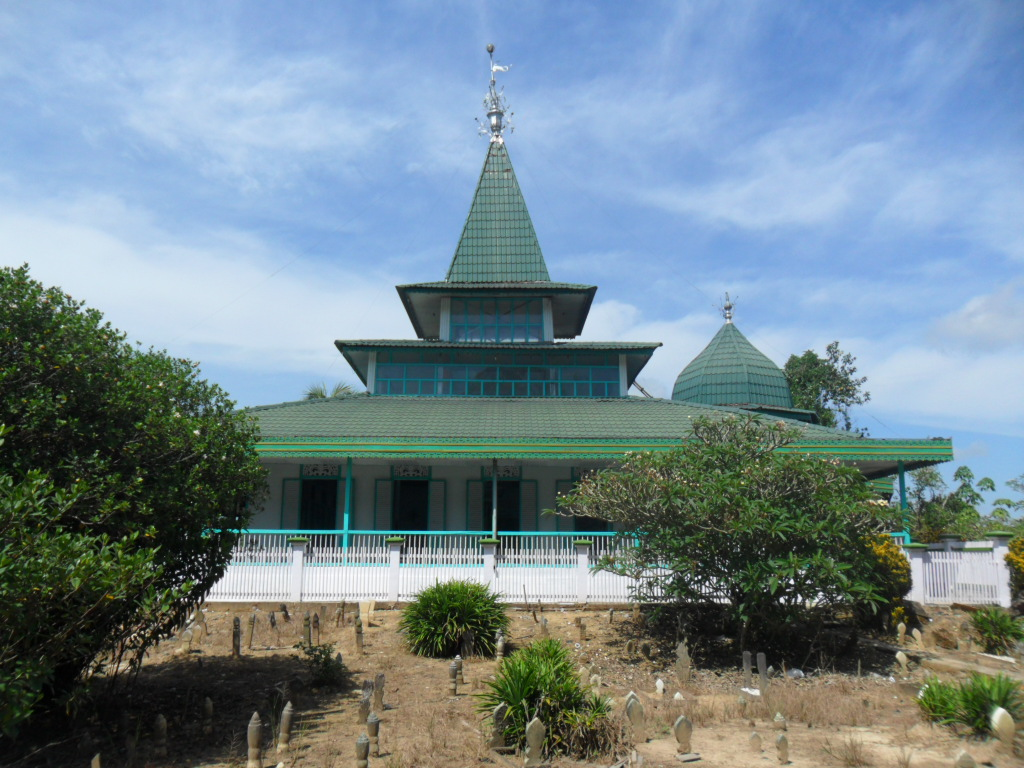
Heritage Mosque of Banua Lawas
