= List of districts of South Kalimantan =

The province of the South Kalimantan in Indonesia is divided into regencies which in turn are divided administratively into districts, known as Kecamatan.

The districts of South Kalimantan, with the regency each falls into, are as follows:

- Alalak, Barito Kuala
- Aluh Aluh, Banjar
- Amuntai Selatan, Hulu Sungai Utara
- Amuntai Tengah, Hulu Sungai Utara
- Amuntai Utara, Hulu Sungai Utara
- Angkinang, Hulu Sungai Selatan
- Angsana, Tanah Bumbu
- Anjir Muara, Barito Kuala
- Anjir Pasar, Barito Kuala
- Aranio, Banjar
- Astambul, Banjar
- Awayan, Balangan
- Babirik, Hulu Sungai Utara
- Bakarangan, Tapin
- Bakumpai, Barito Kuala
- Banjang, Hulu Sungai Utara
- Banjarbaru Selatan, Banjarbaru
- Banjarbaru Utara, Banjarbaru
- Banua Lawas, Tabalong
- Barabai, Hulu Sungai Tengah
- Barambai, Barito Kuala
- Batang Alai Selatan, Hulu Sungai Tengah
- Batang Alai Tengah, Hulu Sungai Tengah
- Batang Alai Timur, Hulu Sungai Tengah
- Batang Alai Utara, Hulu Sungai Tengah
- Bati Bati, Tanah Laut
- Batu Ampar, Tanah Laut
- Batu Benawa, Hulu Sungai Tengah
- Batu Licin, Tanah Bumbu
- Batu Mandi, Balangan
- Belawang, Barito Kuala
- Beruntung Baru, Banjar
- Bintang Ara, Tabalong
- Binuang, Tapin
- Bungur, Tapin
- Candi Laras Selatan, Tapin
- Candi Laras Utara, Tapin
- Cempaka, Banjarbaru
- Cerbon, Barito Kuala
- Daha Barat, Hulu Sungai Selatan
- Daha Selatan, Hulu Sungai Selatan
- Daha Utara, Hulu Sungai Selatan
- Danau Panggang, Hulu Sungai Utara
- Gambut, Banjar
- Halong, Balangan
- Hampang, Kotabaru
- Hantakan, Hulu Sungai Tengah
- Haruai, Tabalong
- Haruyan, Hulu Sungai Tengah
- Hatungun, Tapin
- Haur Gading, Hulu Sungai Utara
- Jaro, Tabalong
- Jejangkit, Barito Kuala
- Jorong, Tanah Laut
- Juai, Balangan
- Kalumpang, Hulu Sungai Selatan
- Kandangan, Hulu Sungai Selatan
- Karang Bintang, Tanah Bumbu
- Karang Intan, Banjar
- Kelua, Tabalong
- Kelumpang Barat, Kotabaru
- Kelumpang Hilir, Kotabaru
- Kelumpang Hulu, Kotabaru
- Kelumpang Selatan, Kotabaru
- Kelumpang Tengah, Kotabaru
- Kelumpang Utara, Kotabaru
- Kertak Hanyar, Banjar
- Kintap, Tanah Laut
- Kota Tanjung
- Kuranji, Tanah Bumbu
- Kurau, Tanah Laut
- Kuripan, Barito Kuala
- Kusan Hilir, Tanah Bumbu
- Kusan Hulu, Tanah Bumbu
- Labuan Amas Selatan, Hulu Sungai Tengah
- Labuan Amas Utara, Hulu Sungai Tengah
- Lampihong, Balangan
- Landasan Ulin, Banjarbaru
- Limpasu, Hulu Sungai Tengah
- Lokpaikat, Tapin
- Loksado, Hulu Sungai Selatan
- Mandastana, Barito Kuala
- Marabahan, Barito Kuala
- Martapura Barat, Banjar
- Martapura Timur, Banjar
- Martapura, Banjar
- Mataraman, Banjar
- Mekar Sari, Barito Kuala
- Mentewe, Tanah Bumbu
- Muara Harus, Tabalong
- Muara Uya, Tabalong
- Murung Pudak, Tabalong
- Padang Batung, Hulu Sungai Selatan
- Paminggir, Hulu Sungai Utara
- Pamukan Barat, Kotabaru
- Pamukan Selatan, Kotabaru
- Pamukan Utara, Kotabaru
- Pandawan, Hulu Sungai Tengah
- Panyipatan, Tanah Laut
- Paramasan, Banjar
- Paringin Selatan, Balangan
- Paringin, Balangan
- Pelaihari, Tanah Laut
- Pengaron, Banjar
- Piani, Tapin
- Pugaan, Tabalong
- Pulau Laut Barat, Kotabaru
- Pulau Laut Kepulauan, Kotabaru
- Pulau Laut Selatan, Kotabaru
- Pulau Laut Tengah, Kotabaru
- Pulau Laut Timur, Kotabaru
- Pulau Laut Utara, Kotabaru
- Pulau Sebuku, Kotabaru
- Pulau Sembilan, Kotabaru
- Rantau Badauh, Barito Kuala
- Rantau Bujur, Banjar
- Salam Babaris, Tapin
- Sambung Makmur, Banjar
- Sampanahan, Kotabaru
- Satui, Tanah Bumbu
- Simpang Empat, Banjar
- Simpang Empat, Tanah Bumbu
- Simpur, Hulu Sungai Selatan
- Sungai Durian, Kotabaru
- Sungai Loban, Tanah Bumbu
- Sungai Pandan, Hulu Sungai Utara
- Sungai Pinang, Banjar
- Sungai Raya, Hulu Sungai Selatan
- Sungai Tabuk, Banjar
- Sungai Tabukan, Hulu Sungai Utara
- Tabukan, Barito Kuala
- Tabunganen, Barito Kuala
- Takisung, Tanah Laut
- Tamban, Barito Kuala
- Tambang Ulang, Tanah Laut
- Tanjung, Tabalong
- Tanta, Tabalong
- Tapin Selatan, Tapin
- Tapin Tengah, Tapin
- Tapin Utara, Tapin
- Tebing Tinggi, Balangan
- Telaga Langsat, Hulu Sungai Selatan
- Upau, Tabalong
- Wanaraya, Barito Ku
- Karias Dalam, Banjang
