= Sungai Durian, Kotabaru =

Sungai Durian
- District
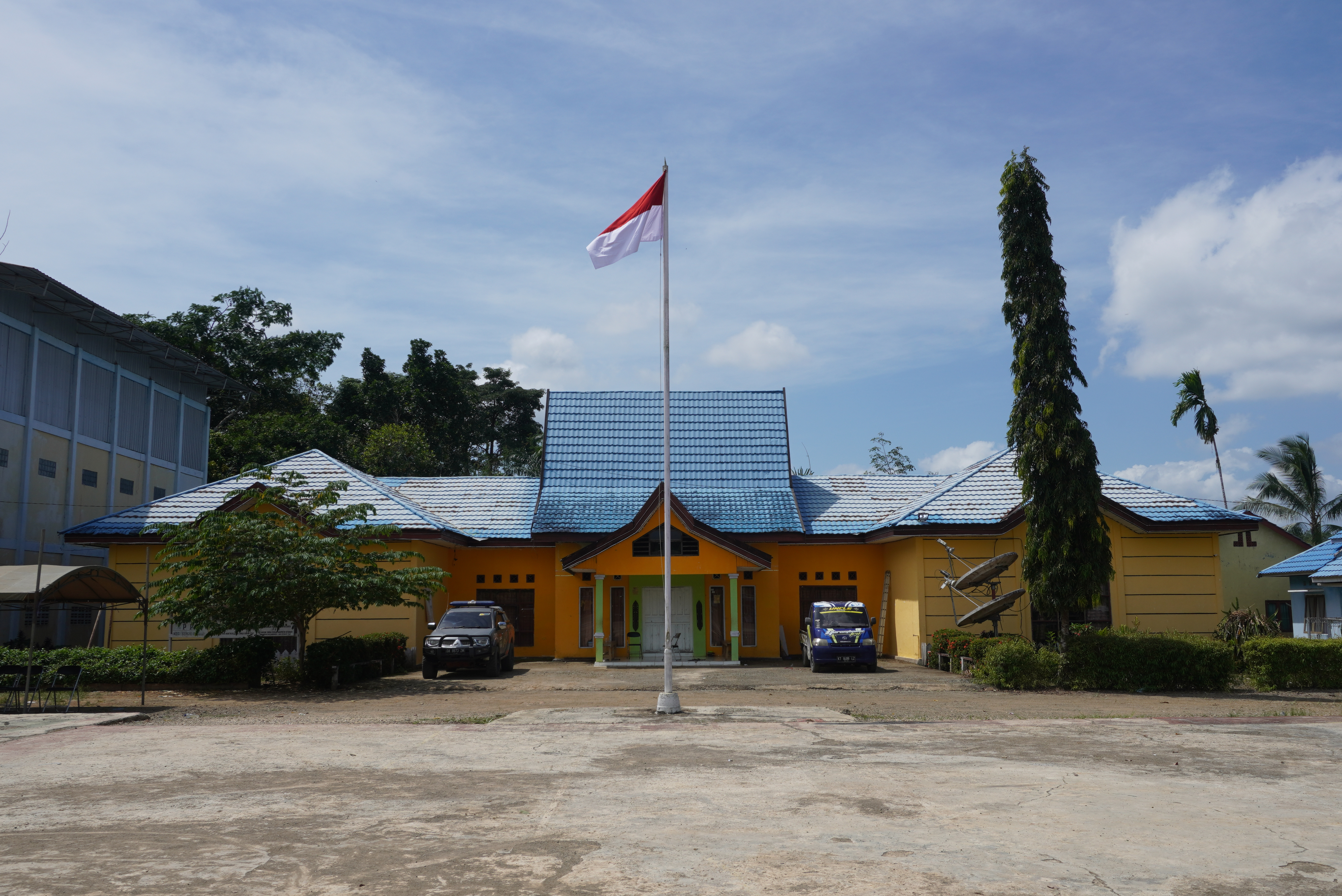
- Sungai Durian subdistrict office

- Location within Indonesia
- Coordinates: 2.597703°S 115.969071°E
- Country: Indonesia
- Province: South Kalimantan
- Regency: Kotabaru

Population (2010)
  - Total: 10,400

Sungai Durian, or "Durian River", is a district (Indonesian: Kecamatan) of Kotabaru Regency in the province of South Kalimantan, Indonesia. The population is entirely rural.

== Geography ==
The district capital is Manunggal Lama. Sungai Durian is bordered on the north by the districts of North Pamukan and Pamukan West; on the east by the district of Sampanahan; on the south by the district of Kelumpang West; and on the west by the district of Juai, Hulu Sungai Utara. The district has an area of 1,042.38 square kilometres (402.47 sq mi) and an average elevation of 5 metres (16 ft) above sea level. It contains seven villages:

Name	Area (km^{2}	Percentage	Pop. 2010
Gendang Timburu	559.16	53.62	918
Manunggal Baru	28.96	2.78	744
Manunggal Lama	111.07	10.68	4,443
Rantau Buda	100.12	9.60	1,231
Rantau Jaya	7.50	0.72	637
Terombong Sari	6.30	0.60	565
Buluh Kuning	229.70	22.03	1,862

Sungai Durian is in the Kutai Basin, which holds a major coal formation created from the Early Pliocene to the Eocene.

== Demographics ==
The district had a total population of 10,400 as of the 2010 census, all considered rural. Of these 5,610 were male and 4,790 female. The breakdown by religion was Islam: 7,029, Christian: 1,130, Catholic: 283, Hindu: 117, Buddhist: 1,104, Other: 737.

== Sources ==
- 19 Kecamatan Sungai Durian (in Indonesian), Badan Perencanaan Pembangunan Daerah
- Penduduk Menurut Wilayah, Daerah Perkotaan/Perdesaan, dan Jenis Kelamin: Kabupaten Kotabaru (in Indonesian), BPS: Badan Pusat Statistik
- Penduduk Menurut Wilayah dan Agama yang Dianut: Kabupaten Kotabaru (in Indonesian), BPS: Badan Pusat Statistik
- Population of Indonesia by Village: Result of 2010 Population Census (PDF), Central Bureau of Statistics (BPS - Statistics Indonesia), archived from the original (PDF) on 2015-02-07
- Sumaatmadja, Eddy R., "Inventarisasi Batubara Di Daerah Lintas Provinsi Daerah Sungai Durian", Badan Geologi (in Indonesian)
