= Ar-Raudhah Great Mosque =

Mosque in Pulang Pisau, Central Kalimantan, Indonesia

- Masjid Agung Ar Raudhah Pulang Pisau
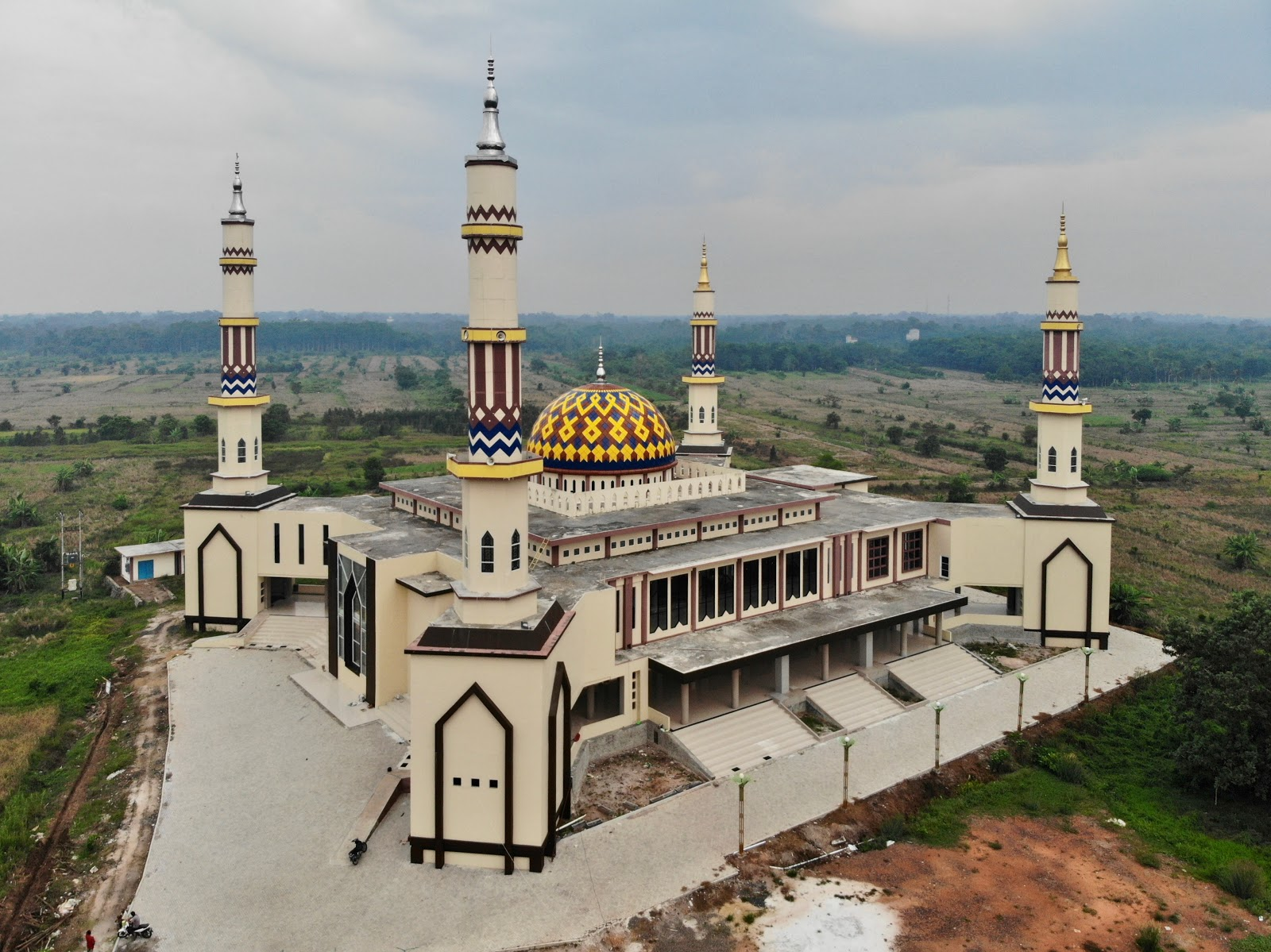

- Location of Ar-Raudhah Great Mosque in Pulang Pisau Regency, Central Kalimantan Ar-Raudhah Great Mosque (Kalimantan)

Religion
- Affiliation: Islam
- Branch/tradition: Sunni

Location
- Location: Pulang Pisau Regency, Central Kalimantan, Indonesia
- Coordinates: 2°46′09″S 114°15′56″E

Architecture
- Type: Mosque
- Style: Modern Arabic architecture
- Established: 2017

Specifications
- Capacity: 1.000 people
- Dome: 1
- Minaret: 4

The Ar-Raudhah Great Mosque (Indonesian: Masjid Agung Ar Raudhah) is the largest mosque in Pulang Pisau Regency, Central Kalimantan, Indonesia. This great mosque is located on the Street of Pembangunan Rei II Arah Pelindo in the subdistrict of Mantaren I, district of Kahayan Hilir. This great mosque is one of the most important icons of Pulang Pisau regency dan it was planned to be the Islamic Centre of the regency.

== History ==
The construction of Ar-raudhah Great Mosque in Pulang Pisau Regency was initiated by the local Islamic scholars and respected figures. They desired to build a huge Islamic religious building which is capable to hold huge amount of worshippers. Another purpose of this great mosque construction was to make an Islamic education centre for the people to learn and study Islamic teachings in Pulang Pisau Regency.

In 2017, the construction process of this great mosque was done after years of construction due to lack of funding. Right after the construction process was completed, this great mosque used to be called as The Great Mosque of Pulang Pisau and didn't have an Islamic name to it. However, the local Islamic scholars and respected figures suggested several Islamic names for this mosque i.e. Al-Eid and Ar-Raudhah. After a quite long discussion, the Islamic name of Ar-Raudhah was chosen to be the official name of this mosque. This great mosque was inaugurated on 6 July 2017 (12 Shawal 1438 H) by the regent of Pulang Pisau at that time, Edy Pratowo.

== Architecture ==
The architecture style of Ar-Raudhah Great Mosque is dominated by the modern Middle Eastern architecture with a single big dome and four minarets within its angles. This great mosque is situated in area whose total size is approximately 79,557 m^{2} (856,340 sq ft). The building area of this great mosque itself is roughly 7,699 m^{2} (82,870 sq ft) The Ar-Raudhah Great mosque is currently capable to host 500 to 1000 worshippers. This mosque has a minbar mainly made of teak wood. Moreover, all door and window frames in this mosque was mainly made of aluminium which is corrosion resistant and suitable for the humid and hot climate of Borneo. The inside of this mosque has two floors with the first floor as the main floor and the second floor as the mezzanine.

== Gallery ==
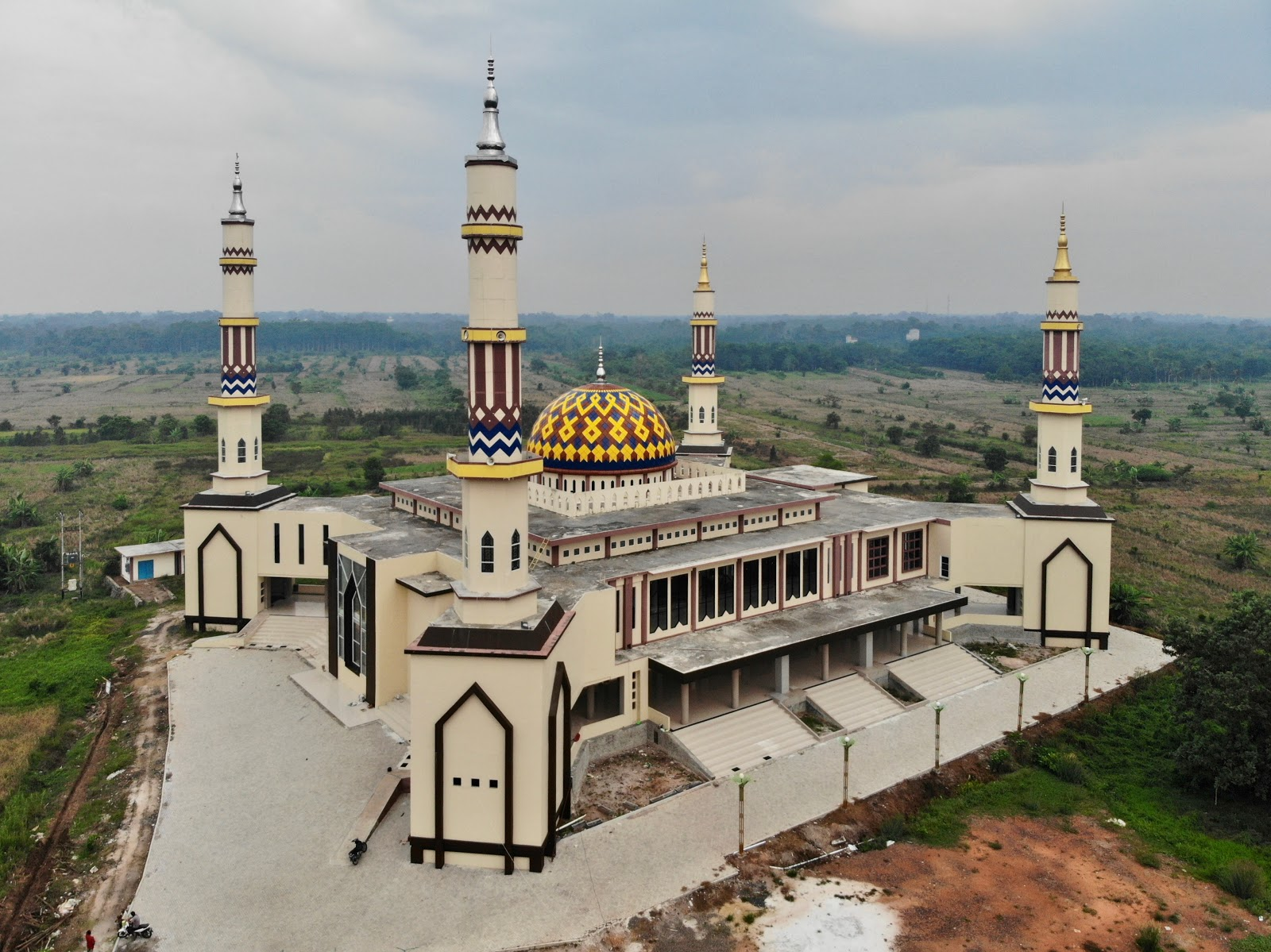
The aerial view of Ar-Raudhah Great Mosque from above

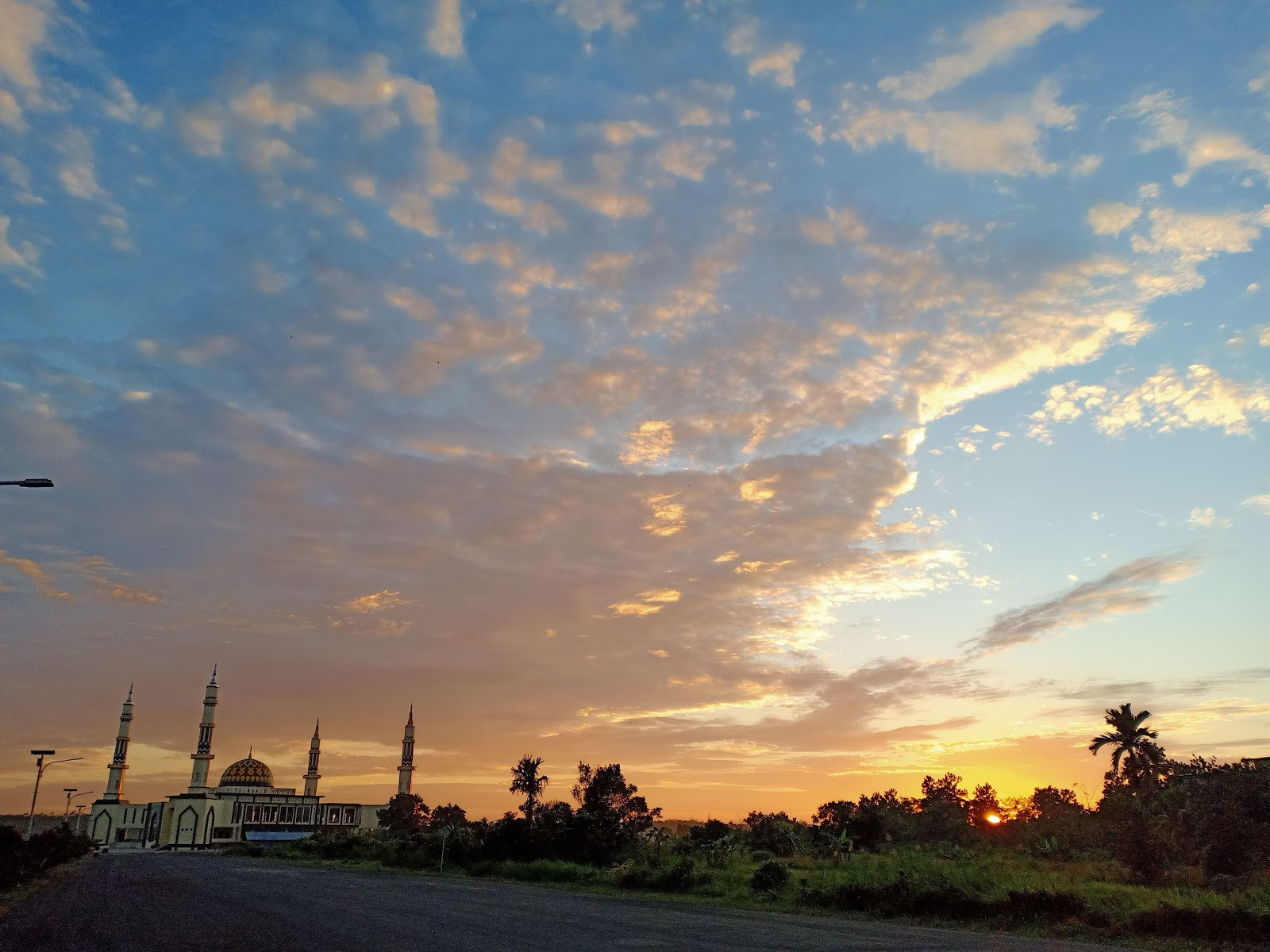
The view of Ar-Raudhah Great Mosque from the main street of Rei II

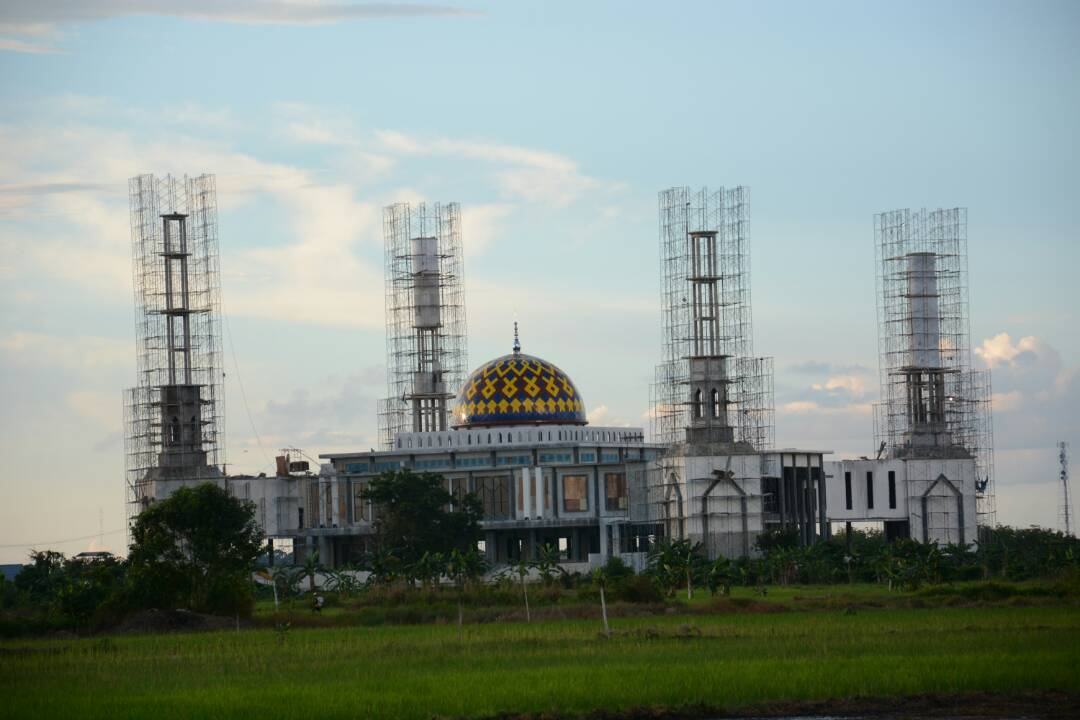
Ar-Raudhah Great Mosque while still under construction

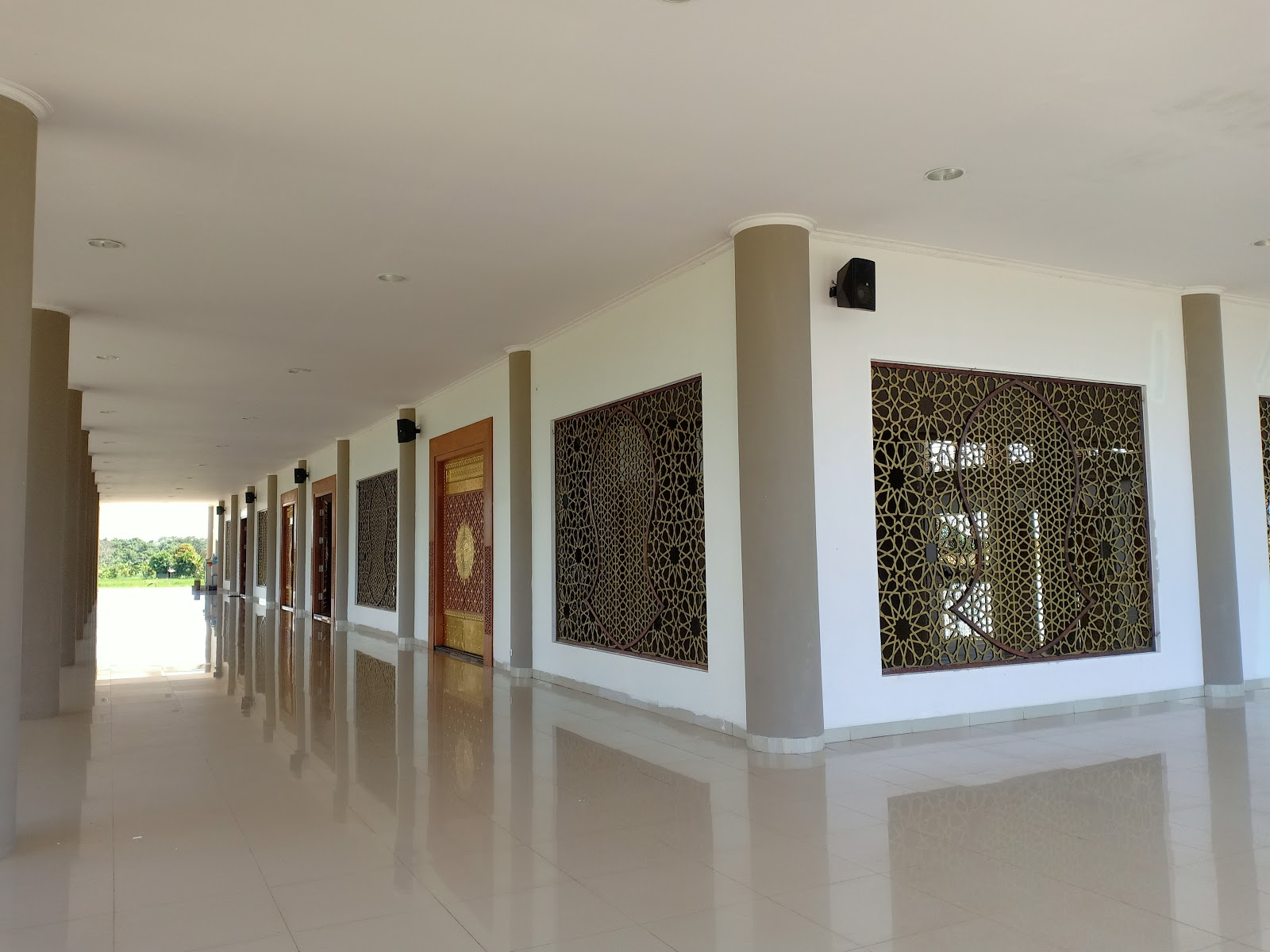
The veranda of Ar-Raudhah Great Mosque, Pulang Pisau

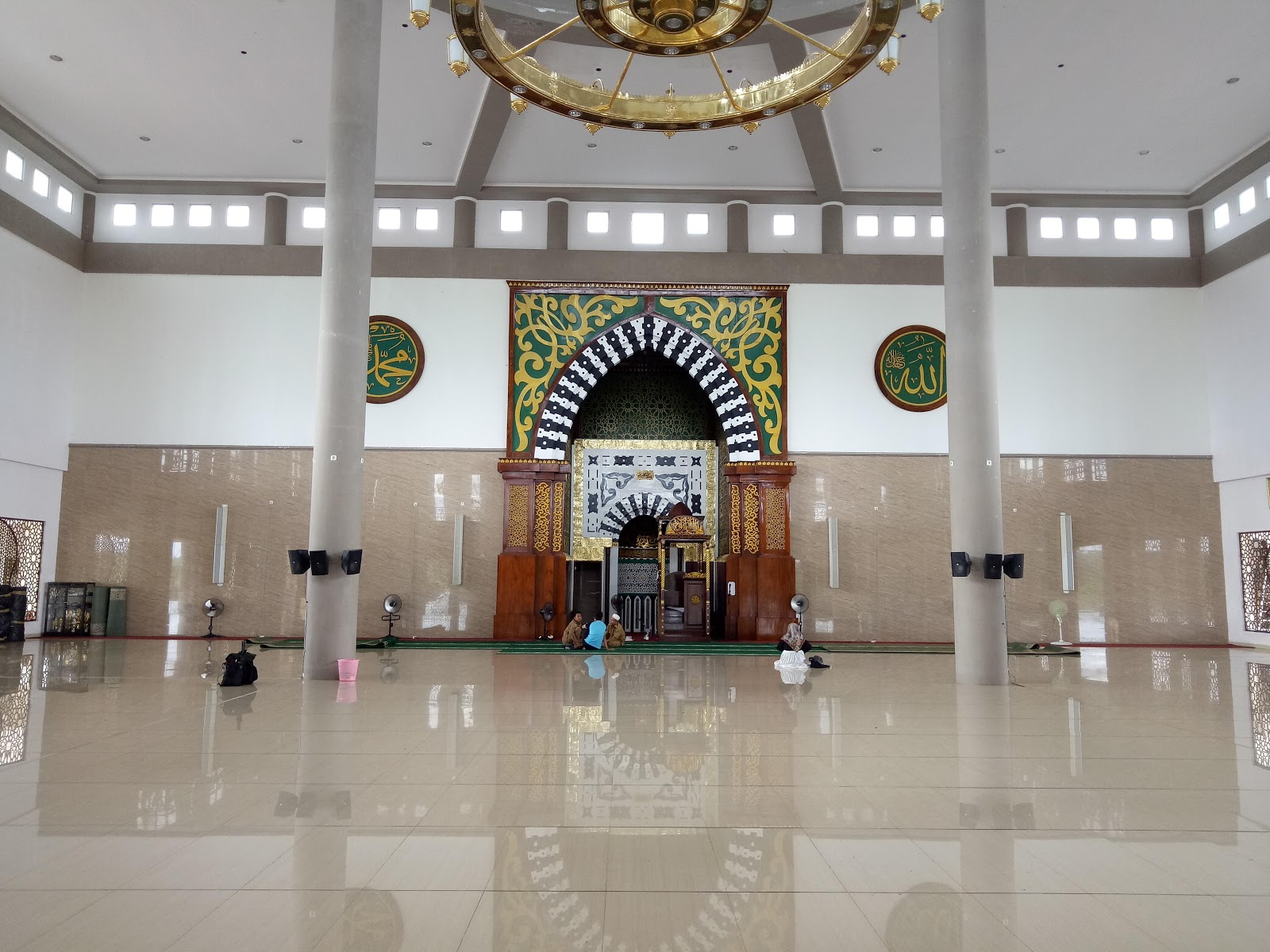
The interior of Ar-Raudhah Great Mosque, Pulang Pisau
