= Pulang Pisau (town) =

Pulang Pisau Pulang Pisau
- Regency seat
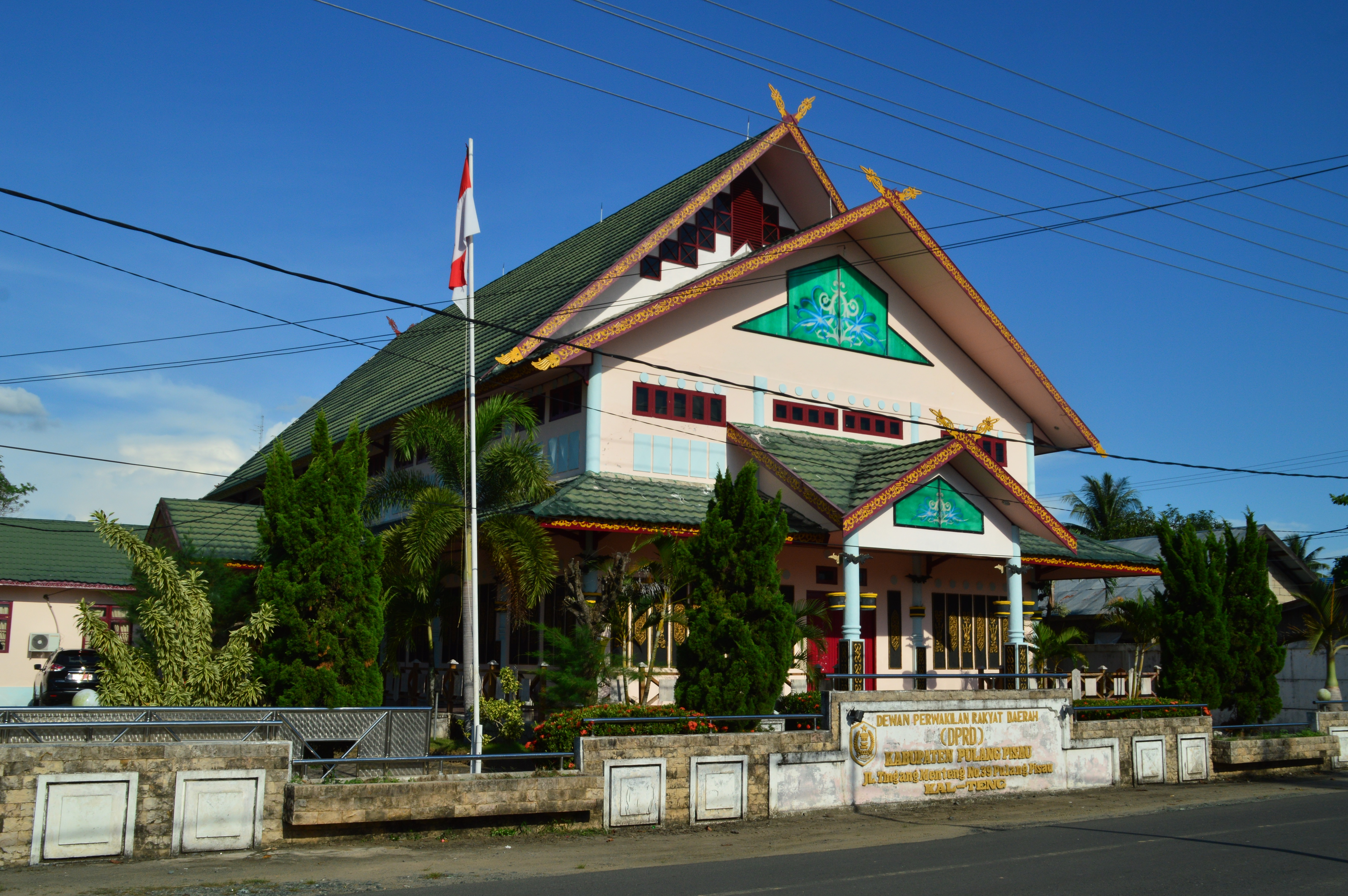
- The Office of Regional People's Representative Council of Pulang Pisau Regency
- Motto: "Handep Hapakat"; Ngaju language: "Agreed upon Mutual Cooperation, Help, and Consensus"
- Location in Central Kalimantan, Indonesia Pulang Pisau (Indonesia)
- Coordinates: 2°44′53″S 114°15′30″E
- Country: Indonesia
- Province: Central Kalimantan
- Regency: Pulang Pisau Regency
- District: Kahayan Hilir

Area
  - Total: 6.4 km^{2} (2.5 sq mi)
- Elevation: 12 m (39 ft)

Population (2024)
  - Total: 7,038
  - Density: 1,192/km^{2} (3,090/sq mi)
- Time zone: UTC+7 (Western Indonesian Time)
- Postal code: 74841
- Postal code: 74813
- Area code: +62513

Pulang Pisau (abbreviated: PPS), a town (kelurahan) in the administrative district of Kahayan Hilir, is the regency seat of Pulang Pisau Regency and also one of the towns in Central Kalimantan. This town is at a distance of 91 km southeast of Palangka Raya city, the capital of Central Kalimantan Province. The population of the town was 7,082 people as of 2024 and it covers an area of 6.4 km^{2}, while the neighbouring Anjir Pulang Piau had 5,800 inhabitants in its 51 km^{2}.

== Demographics ==
As at 2024, the population of Pulang Pisau town was 7,082 inhabitants which represents 20.4% of the population of Kahayan Hilir District and 5% of the entire population of Pulang Pisau Regency. The population density of this town is 1,192 people/km^{2} which one of the highest amongst towns in Central Kalimantan. This town has 2,479 households and the average household size of this town is 2.7 people. The sex ratio of Pulang Pisau town is 104 which means there are 104 males to every 100 females.

== Geography ==
Pulang Pisau, Central Kalimantan

Climate chart (precipitation, max. and min. temperature)
J	F	M	A	M	J	J	A	S	O	N	D
304 31 23	281 31 23	297 31 24	257 31 24	181 31 24	144 31 24	109 31 23	82 32 23	92 33 24	180 33 24	266 31 24	326 31 24
- █ Average max. and min. temperatures in °C
- █ Precipitation totals in mm
- Source: Climate-Data.org & BMKG
Imperial conversion
J	F	M	A	M	J	J	A	S	O	N	D
12 88 74	11 88 74	12 88 74	10 88 75	7.1 88 75	5.7 87 74	4.3 87 74	3.2 90 74	3.6 91 75	7.1 91 75	10 88 74	13 87 74
- █ Average max. and min. temperatures in °F
- █ Precipitation totals in inches

Pulang Pisau town is located at the southeastern portion of Central Kalimantan. To be precise, this town is located at 2.748170 degrees south and 114.258275 degrees east, at the eastern-to-southeastern corner of Pulang Pisau Regency and to the southeast of Palangka Raya city (the provincial capital of Central Kalimantan) at a distance of 91 km. The total area of Pulang Pisau town is about 6.4 km^{2} which makes it roughly 1.15% of the total area of Kahayan Hilir district and roughly 0.06% of the entire area of Pulang Pisau Regency.

With its location that within the Kahayan river basin, this town is situated on the banks of that river. Pulang Pisau town is also situated in the lowlands of the southern portion of Central Kalimantan with its altitude being somewhere between 5 and 20 metres above sea level. This town experiences tropical rainforest climate (Af) with high amounts of precipitation most of the year, constantly high humidity, and persistent warm-to-hot temperature.

== Education ==
Pulang Pisau town as of 2021 had seven kindergartens (one public kindergarten and six private kindergartens), eight public primary schools, one public middle school, one private high school, and one private vocational school.

== Public facilities ==
For healthcare facilities, Pulang Pisau town in 2021 had one medical centre/polyclinic, one public health centre, five pharmacies, and is served by one general hospital in the neighbouring village of Mantaren I. For economic, trade, and accommodation facilities, this town recently has three markets, one shopping complex, 52 grocery shops, one restaurant, 55 food stalls/cafes, four banks, three cooperatives, and four inns. For religious facility, this town has ten Islamic religious facilities and six churches.
