= Pulang Pisau Regency =

Regency in Central Kalimantan, Indonesia

Pulang Pisau Regency Kabupaten Pulang Pisau
- Regency
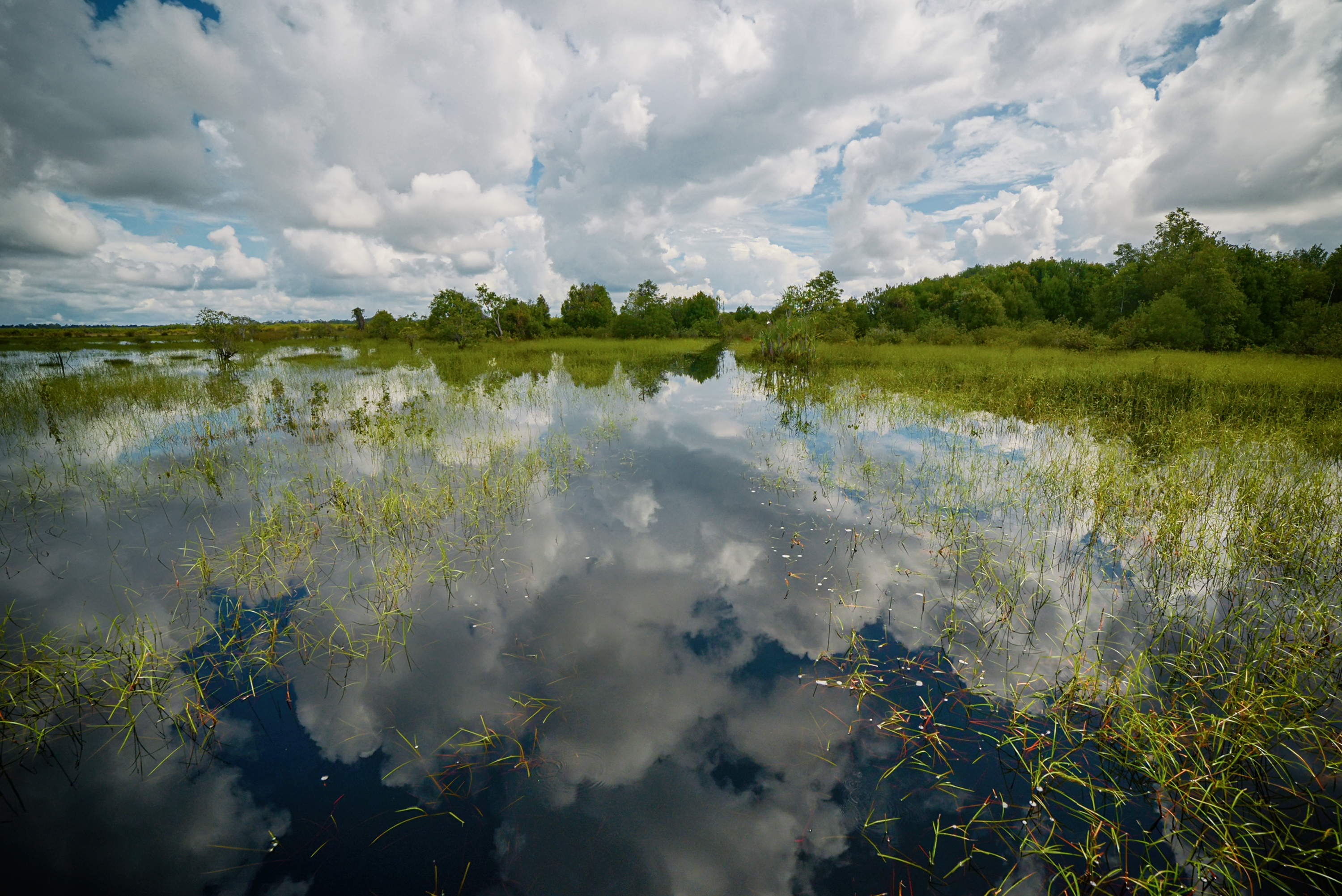
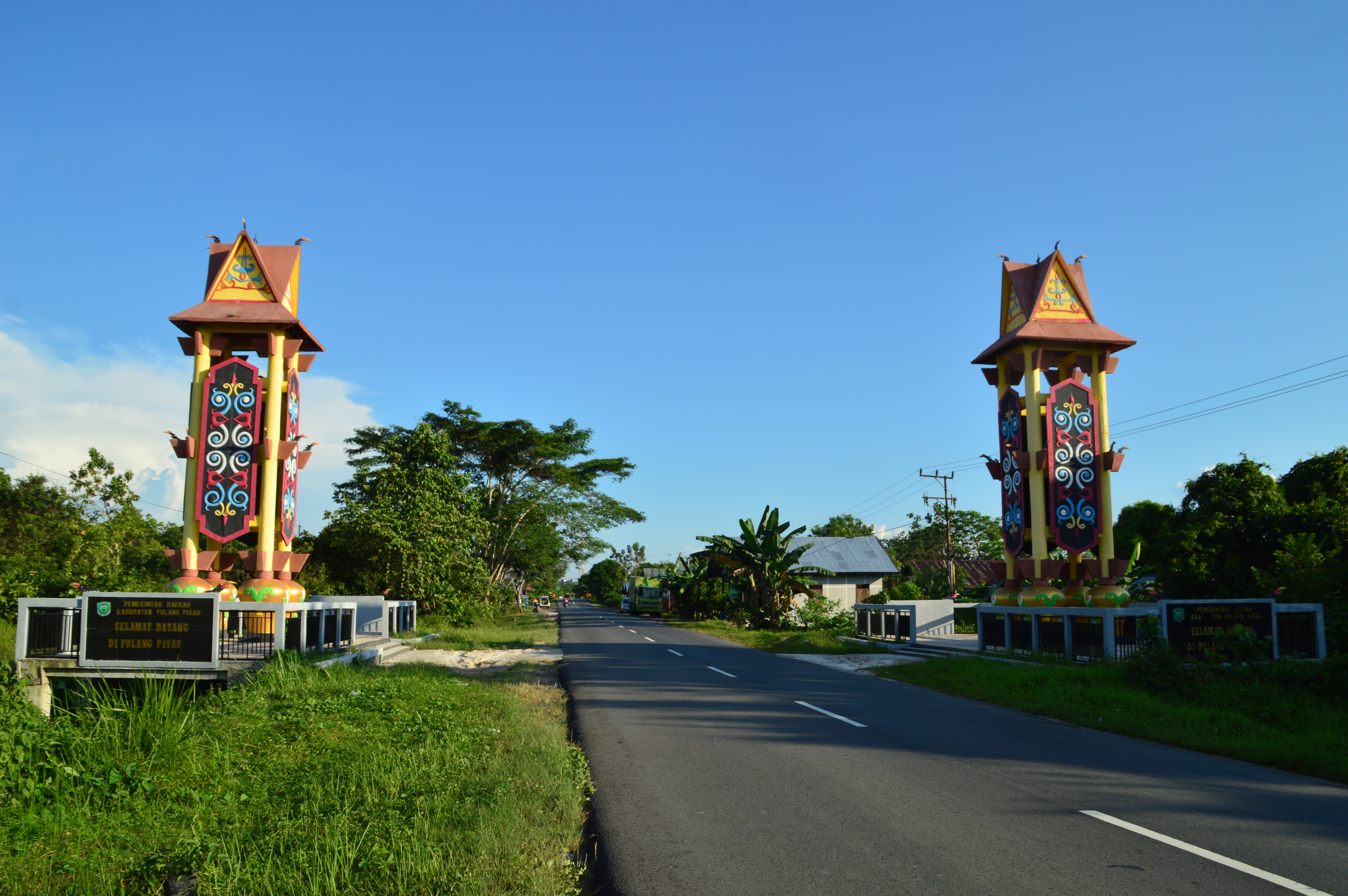
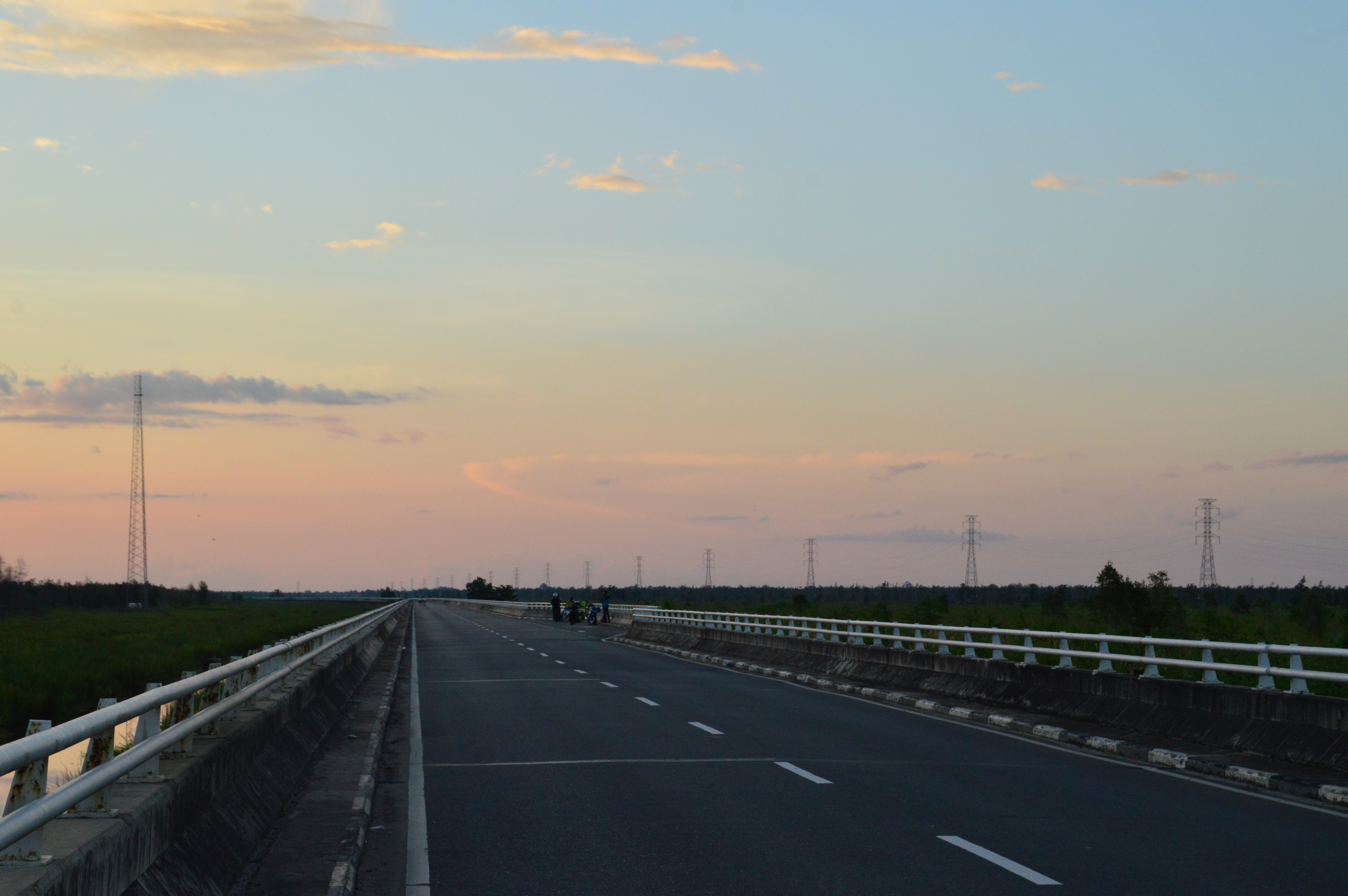
- From top, left to right: Sebangau National Park, Welcome to Pulang Pisau monument, Tumbang Nusa Bridge

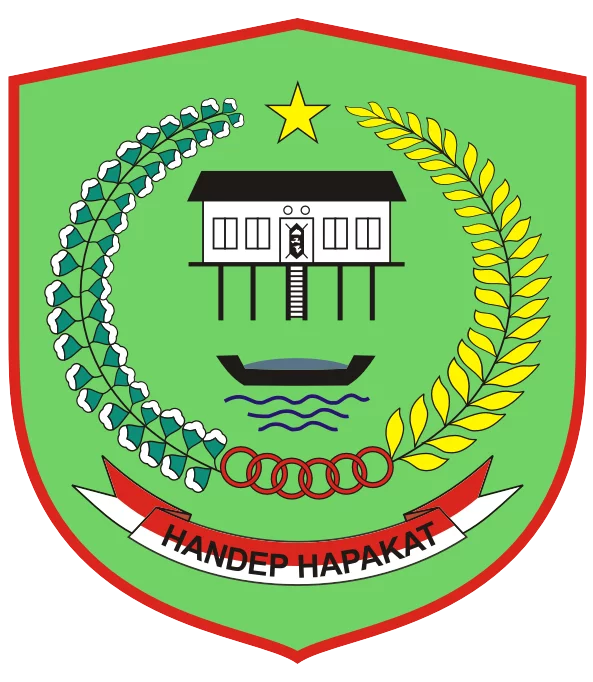
- Coat of arms
- Motto(s): "Handep Hapakat"; Ngaju language: "Agreed upon Mutual Cooperation, Help, and Consensus"
- Location within Central Kalimantan

- Location in Kalimantan and Indonesia Pulang Pisau Regency (Indonesia)
- Coordinates: 3.1186°S 113.8623°E
- Country: Indonesia
- Region: Kalimantan
- Province: Central Kalimantan
- Capital: Pulang Pisau

Government
  - Regent: Ahmad Rifa'i
  - Vice Regent: Ahmad Jayadikarta

Area
  - Total: 9,650.86 km^{2} (3,726.22 sq mi)

Population (mid 2025 estimate)
  - Total: 140,780
  - Density: 14.587/km^{2} (37.781/sq mi)
- Time zone: UTC+7 (Western Indonesia Time)
- Area code: (+62) 513
- Website: pulangpisaukab.go.id

Pulang Pisau Regency (Indonesian: Kabupaten Pulang Pisau) is one of the thirteen regencies which comprise the Central Kalimantan Province on the island of Kalimantan (Borneo), Indonesia. It was created on 10 April 2002 from what were previously the southwest districts of Kapuas Regency. The town of Pulang Pisau (with 7,082 inhabitants as at mid 2024) is the administrative capital of Pulang Pisau Regency. The land area of Pulang Pisau Regency is 9,650.86 km^{2}, and its population was 120,062 at the 2010 Census (an increase from 111,488 at the previous Census in 2000) and 134,499 at the 2020 Census; the official estimate as at mid 2025 was 140,780 (comprising 72,920 males and 67,860 females).

== Administrative districts ==
Pulang Pisau Regency consists of eight districts (kecamatan), tabulated below with their areas and their population totals from the 2010 Census and the 2020 Census, together with the official estimates as at mid 2025. The two most northerly districts (Kahayan Tengah and Banama Tingang) are upstream on the Kahayan River, and are physically almost separated from the rest of the regency. The table also includes the locations of the district administrative centres, the number of administrative villages in each district (totaling 95 rural desa and 4 urban kelurahan), and its postal codes.

Kode Wilayah	Name of District (kecamatan)	Area in km^{2}	Pop'n Census 2010	Pop'n Census 2020	Pop'n Estimate mid 2025	Admin centre	No. of villages	Post codes
62.11.02	Kahayan Kuala	1,308.83	19,764	19,878	20,150	Bahaur Basantan	13 ^{(a)}	74872
62.11.08	Sebangau Kuala	4,133.46	7,860	8,371	8,480	Sebangau Permai	8	74874
62.11.01	Pandih Batu	452.76	19,744	20,770	21,740	Pangkoh Hilir	16	74871
62.11.06	Maliku	411.59	22,898	26,060	27,270	Maliku Batu	15	74873
62.11.05	Kahayan Hilir	556.41	26,267	31,383	33,630	Pulang Pisau	10 ^{(b)}	^{(c)}
62.11.07	Jabiren Raya	1,112.19	7,751	9,025	9,550	Jabiren	8	74816
62.11.03	Kahayan Tengah	1,094.31	7,384	8,782	9,070	Bukit Rawi	14	74862
62.11.04	Banama Tingang	581.31	8,394	10,230	10,890	Bawan	15	74863
	Totals	9,650.86	120,062	134,499	140,780	Pulang Pisau	99	

Note: (a) including one kelurahan - Bahaur Basantan. (b) includes 3 kelurahan - Bereng, Kalawa and Pulau Pisang.
(c) Kahayan Hilir District has a variety of postcodes; Gohong village and Kalawa town have a postcode of 74812, Anjir Pulang Pisau town has 74813, Mintin village has 74816, Hanjack Maju village has 74821, Bereng town has 74831, Kahayan Hilir (Pulang Pisau town) has 74841 and Buntoi, Mantaren I and Mantaren II villages share 74861.

== Orangutan conservation ==
In 2015, the local government agreed to make Badak Besar and Badak Kecil regions on Salat Nusa Island into a conservation area for orangutans. Central Kalimantan province has an orangutan rehabilitation area in Nyaru Menteng.

== Climate ==
Pulang Pisau has a tropical rainforest climate (Af) with heavy rainfall in all months except July and August.

Climate data for Pulang Pisau
Month	Jan	Feb	Mar	Apr	May	Jun	Jul	Aug	Sep	Oct	Nov	Dec	Year
Mean daily maximum °C (°F)	29.3 (84.7)	29.9 (85.8)	30.4 (86.7)	31.0 (87.8)	31.0 (87.8)	30.8 (87.4)	31.2 (88.2)	31.8 (89.2)	32.1 (89.8)	31.8 (89.2)	30.9 (87.6)	30.2 (86.4)	30.9 (87.6)
Daily mean °C (°F)	25.8 (78.4)	26.2 (79.2)	26.6 (79.9)	27.0 (80.6)	27.0 (80.6)	26.6 (79.9)	26.7 (80.1)	27.1 (80.8)	27.3 (81.1)	27.2 (81.0)	26.8 (80.2)	26.5 (79.7)	26.7 (80.1)
Mean daily minimum °C (°F)	22.3 (72.1)	22.6 (72.7)	22.8 (73.0)	23.0 (73.4)	23.0 (73.4)	22.4 (72.3)	22.3 (72.1)	22.4 (72.3)	22.6 (72.7)	22.6 (72.7)	22.7 (72.9)	22.8 (73.0)	22.6 (72.7)
Average rainfall mm (inches)	283 (11.1)	288 (11.3)	284 (11.2)	255 (10.0)	234 (9.2)	141 (5.6)	114 (4.5)	116 (4.6)	141 (5.6)	148 (5.8)	230 (9.1)	275 (10.8)	2,509 (98.8)
Source: Climate-Data.org
