= Economy of Indonesia =

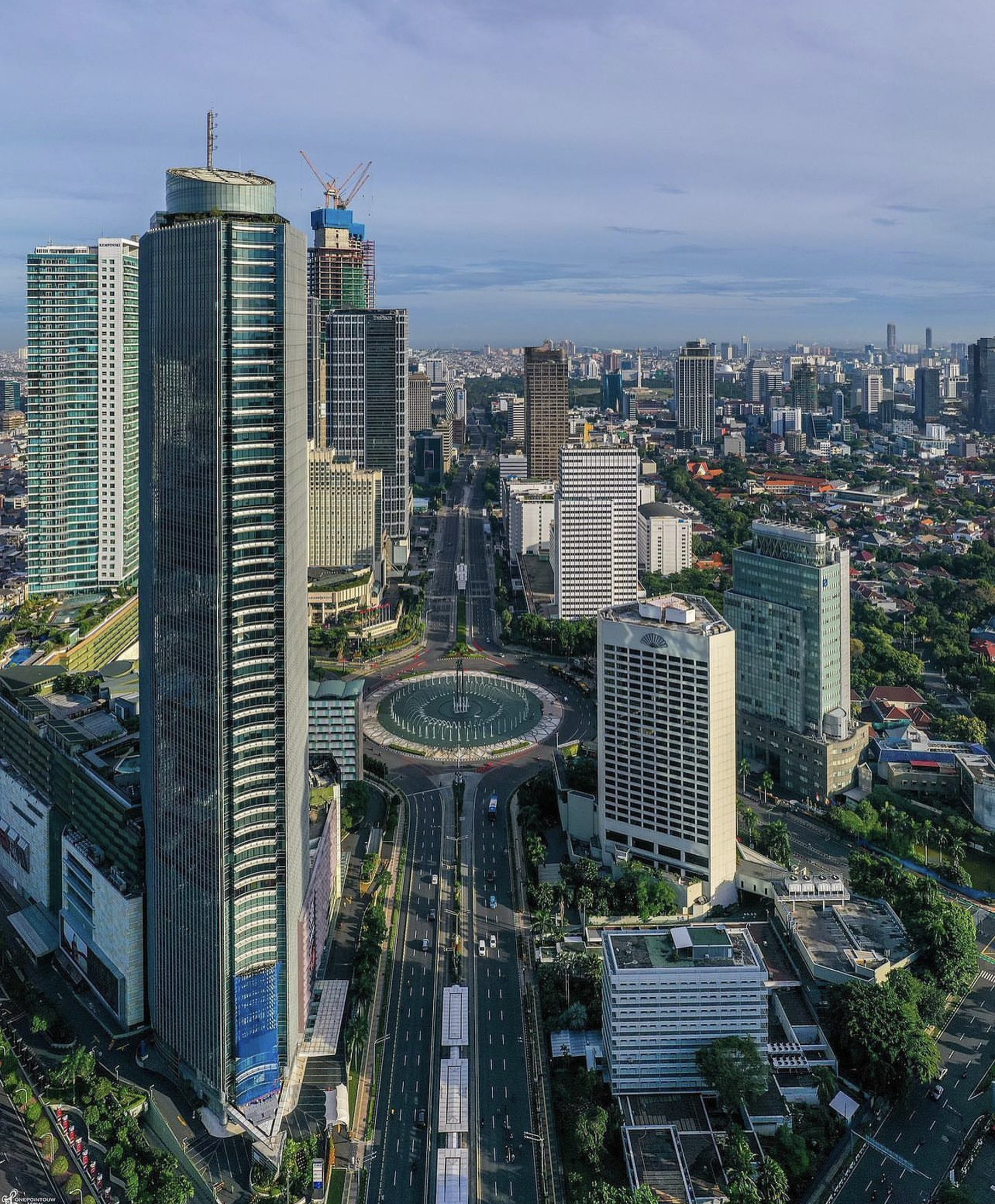
- Jakarta, with its central business district, is Indonesia's principal fintech, financial and business services centre.
- Currency: Rupiah (IDR, Rp)
- Fiscal year: 1 January - 31 December
- Trade organizations: APEC, WTO, G-20, BRICS, IOR-ARC, RCEP, AFTA, ASEAN, EAS, ADB, others
- Country group: Developing/Emerging; Newly industrialised country

Statistics
- Population: ▲287,200,000 (2026 est.)
- GDP: ▲$1.580 trillion (nominal; 2026); ▲$5.483 trillion (PPP; 2026)
- GDP rank: 17th (nominal; 2026); 7th (PPP; 2026)
- GDP growth: 5.11% (2025)
- GDP per capita: ▲$5,153 (nominal; 2026); ▲$19,091 (PPP; 2026)
- GDP per capita rank: 121st (nominal; 2026); 104th (PPP; 2026)
- GDP per capita growth: 4.3% (2025)
- GDP by sector: Agriculture: 13.7%; Industry: 41%; Services: 45.4%; (2017 est.)
- Inflation (CPI): ▼2.42% (April 2026)
- Population below national poverty line: ▼1.6% in multidimensional poverty (2024); ▼8.07% in national poverty line (Mar 2026); 64% on less than $8.30/day (2025)
- Gini coefficient: ▼34.4 medium (2025)
- Human Development Index: ▲0.728 high (2023, 113th); ▲0.608 medium (2023, IHDI 86th)
- Corruption Perceptions Index: ▲37 out of 100 points (2024, 99th rank)
- Labour force: ▲147,800,000 (2023); 75% employment rate (2023)
- Labour force by occupation: Agriculture: 27.7%; Industry: 22.6%; Services: 49.6%; (2020 est.)
- Unemployment: ▼4.74% (2025 est.)
- Youth unemployment: ▼13.0% (2025)
- Informal employment: 81% (2023)
- Main industries: palm oil, coal, petroleum, petrochemicals, liquified natural gas, vehicle, electronics, transportation, machinery, steel, telecommunications, electric power, food processing, wood industry, textile, footwear, consumer goods, paper, handicrafts, chemicals, rubber, pharmaceuticals, financial services, seafood, smelting, and tourism

External
- Exports: $309.75 billion (2024)
- Export goods: palm oil, steel, metal, machinery and industrial equipment, chemical products, liquefied natural gas, textile products, footwear products, automobiles, transportation products, wooden products, plastics
- Main export partners: China 24.2%; ASEAN 18.2%; United States 10.6%; India 8.2%; Japan 7.5%; European Union 6.9%; South Korea 3.7%; (2024)
- Imports: $284.7 billion (2024)
- Import goods: Machinery and Industrial equipment, Steel, Foodstuffs, Petroleum products, Electronics, Raw material, Chemicals products, Transportation products
- Main import partners: China 36.3%; ASEAN 17.5%; Japan 7.5%; European Union 6.4%; Australia 4.9%; United States 4.8%; South Korea 4.4%; (2024)
- FDI stock: ▲$262.92 billion (inward, 2023); ▲$103.94 billion (outward, 2023)
- Current account: ▲ +$3.46 billion (2021 est.)
- Gross external debt: ▼$396.3 billion (Q2 2023)

Public finance
- Government debt: ▲38.6% of GDP (2025 est.)
- Foreign reserves: ▲$156.1 billion (Jan 2025)
- Budget balance: −1.49% (of GDP) (2025 est.)
- Revenue: $182.1 billion (2024 est.)
- Spending: $216.1 billion (2024 est.)
- Credit rating: Japan Credit Rating Agency: A− (Domestic Currency); BBB+ (Foreign Currency); BBB+ (Bond); Outlook: Stable; Standard & Poor's: BBB (Domestic); BBB (Foreign); BBB (T&C Assessment); Outlook: Stable; Moody's: Baa2; Outlook: Negative; Fitch: BBB (Local Currency); BBB (Foreign Currency); BBB (Country Ceiling); Outlook: Stable
- All values, unless otherwise stated, are in US dollars.

Indonesia has a mixed economy with dirigiste characteristics. It is one of the emerging market economies in the world and the largest in Southeast Asia. As an upper-middle income country and member of the G20, Indonesia is classified as a newly industrialised country. Indonesia has the 17th largest economy in the world by nominal GDP and the 7th largest in terms of GDP (PPP). Indonesia's internet economy reached US$77 billion in 2022.

Indonesia depends on the domestic market and government budget spending and its ownership of state-owned enterprises. Indonesian state-owned companies have assets valued at more than 1 trillion USD as of 2024. Government price controls are applied to a range of basic goods (including rice and electricity) and play a significant role in Indonesia's market economy. However, a mix of micro, medium and small companies contribute around 61.7% of the economy and significant major private-owned companies and foreign companies are also present.

In the aftermath of the 1997 Asian financial crisis, the government took custody of a significant portion of private sector assets through the acquisition of nonperforming bank loans and corporate assets through the debt restructuring process, and the companies in custody were sold for privatisation several years later. Since 1999, the economy has recovered, and growth accelerated to over 4–6% in the early 2000s. Indonesia faced a recession in 2020 when the economic growth collapsed to −2.07% due to the COVID-19 pandemic, its worst economic performance since the 1997 crisis. In recent years Indonesia's manufacturing sector, long its growth engine, has shedded hundreds of thousands of jobs, with an estimated loss of 300,000 since 2023.

== History ==
=== Sukarno era ===
In the years immediately following the proclamation of Indonesian independence, both the Japanese occupation and the conflict between Dutch and Republican forces had crippled the country's production, with exports of commodities such as rubber and oil being reduced to 12 and 5% of their pre-WW2 levels, respectively. The first Republican government-controlled bank, the Indonesian State Bank (Bank Negara Indonesia, BNI) was founded on 5 July 1946. It initially acted as the manufacturer and distributor of ORI (Oeang Republik Indonesia/Money of the Republic of Indonesia), a currency issued by the Republican Government which was the predecessor of Rupiah. Despite this, currency issued during the Japanese occupation and by Dutch authorities was still in circulation, and the simplicity of the ORI made its counterfeiting relatively easy, worsening matters. Between 1949 and 1960, Indonesia experienced several economic disruptions. The country's independence recognised by the Netherlands, the dissolution of the United States of Indonesia in 1950, the subsequent liberal democracy period, the nationalisation of De Javasche Bank into the modern Bank Indonesia, and the takeover of Dutch corporate assets following the West New Guinea dispute, which all resulted in the devaluation of Dutch banknotes into half their value.

During the guided democracy era in the 1960s, the economy deteriorated drastically as a result of political instability. The government was inexperienced in implementing macroeconomic policies, which resulted in severe poverty and hunger. By the time of Sukarno's downfall in the mid-1960s, the economy was in chaos with 1,000% annual inflation, shrinking export revenues, crumbling infrastructure, factories operating at minimal capacity, and negligible investment. Nevertheless, Indonesia's post-1960 economic improvement was considered remarkable when taking into consideration how few indigenous Indonesians in the 1950s had received a formal education under Dutch colonial policies.

=== New Order ===
Following President Sukarno's downfall, the New Order administration brought a degree of discipline to economic policy that quickly brought inflation down, stabilised the currency, rescheduled foreign debt, and attracted foreign aid and investment. (See Inter-Governmental Group on Indonesia and Berkeley Mafia). Indonesia was for many years Southeast Asia's only member of OPEC, and the 1970s oil price rise provided an export revenue windfall that contributed to sustained high economic growth rates, averaging over 7% from 1968 to 1981.

With high levels of state regulation and dependence on declining oil prices, growth slowed to an average of 4.5% per annum between 1981 and 1988. A range of economic reforms was introduced in the late 1980s, including a managed devaluation of the rupiah to improve export competitiveness, and deregulation of the financial sector. Foreign investment flowed into Indonesia, particularly into the rapidly developing export-oriented manufacturing sector, and from 1989 to 1997, the Indonesian economy grew by an average of over 7%. GDP per capita grew 545% from 1970 to 1980 as a result of the sudden increase in oil export revenues from 1973 to 1979. High levels of economic growth masked several structural weaknesses in the economy. It came at a high cost in terms of weak and corrupt governmental institutions, severe public indebtedness through mismanagement of the financial sector, rapid depletion of natural resources, and a culture of favours and corruption among politicians and the business elite.

Corruption particularly gained momentum in the 1990s, reaching the highest levels of the political hierarchy as Suharto became a highly corrupt leader according to Transparency International. As a result, the legal system was weak, and there was no effective way to enforce contracts, collect debts, or sue for bankruptcy. Banking practices were very unsophisticated, with collateral-based lending the norm and widespread violation of prudential regulations, including limits on connected lending. Non-tariff barriers, rent-seeking by state-owned enterprises, domestic subsidies, barriers to domestic trade and export restrictions all created economic distortions.

The 1997 Asian financial crisis that began to affect Indonesia became an economic and political crisis. The initial response was to float the rupiah, raise key domestic interest rates, and tighten fiscal policy. In October 1997, Indonesia and the International Monetary Fund (IMF) reached an agreement on an economic reform program aimed at macroeconomic stabilisation and the elimination of some of the country's most damaging economic policies, such as the National Car Program and the clove monopoly, both involving family members of Suharto. The rupiah remained weak, however, and Suharto was forced to resign in May 1998 after massive riots erupted. In August 1998, Indonesia and the IMF agreed on an Extended Fund Facility (EFF) under President B. J. Habibie that included significant structural reform targets. President Abdurrahman Wahid took office in October 1999, and Indonesia and the IMF signed another EFF in January 2000. The new program also has a range of economic, structural reform, and governance targets.

The effects of the crisis were severe. By November 1997, rapid currency depreciation had seen public debt reach US$60 billion, imposing severe strains on the government's budget. In 1998, real GDP contracted by 13.1%, and the economy reached its low point in mid-1999 with 0.8% real GDP growth. Inflation reached 72% in 1998 but slowed to 2% in 1999. The rupiah, which had been in the RP 2,600/USD1 range at the start of August 1997 fell to 11,000/USD1 by January 1998, with spot rates around 15,000 for brief periods during the first half of 1998. It returned to the 8,000/USD1 range at the end of 1998 and has generally traded in the Rp 8,000–10,000/USD1 range ever since, with fluctuations that are relatively predictable and gradual. However, the rupiah began devaluing past 11,000 in 2013, and as of November 2016 is around 13,000 Rp/USD1.

=== Reform era ===
Since an inflation target was introduced in 2000, the GDP deflator and the CPI have grown at an average annual pace of 10¾% and 9%, respectively, similar to the pace recorded in the two decades prior to the 1997 crisis, but well below the pace in the 1960s and 1970s. Inflation has also generally trended lower through the 2000s, with some of the fluctuations in inflation reflecting government policy initiatives such as the changes in fiscal subsidies in 2005 and 2008, which caused large temporary spikes in CPI growth.

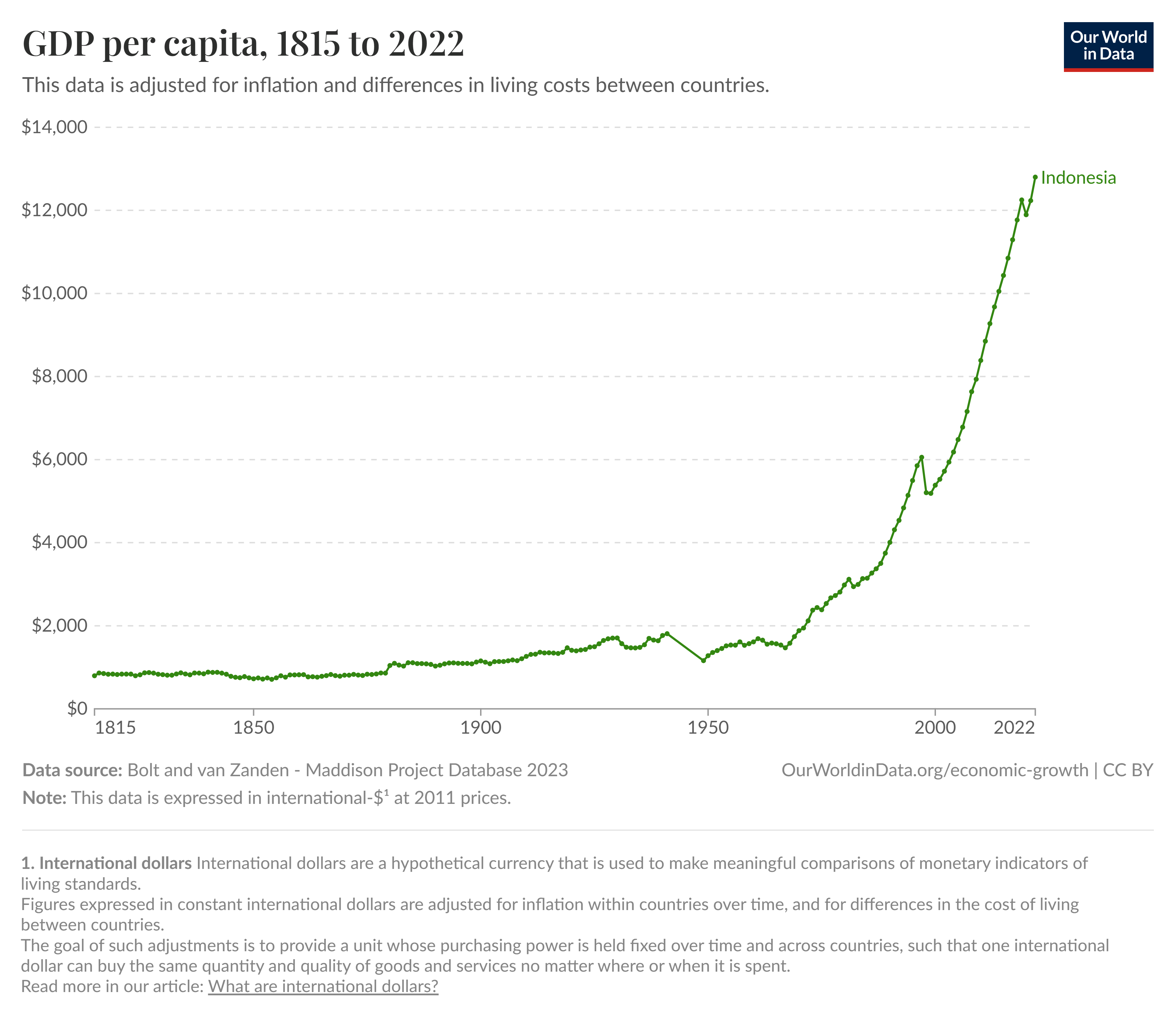
Historical GDP per capita development of Indonesia

Share of world GDP (PPP)
| Year | Share |
|---|---|
| 1980 | 1.24% |
| 1990 | 1.68% |
| 2000 | 1.7% |
| 2010 | 2.07% |
| 2020 | 2.31% |
| 2025 | 2.42% |

In late 2004, Indonesia faced a 'mini-crisis' due to international oil prices rises and imports. The currency exchange rate reached Rp 12,000/USD1 before stabilising. Under President Susilo Bambang Yudhoyono (SBY), the government was forced to cut its massive fuel subsidies, which were planned to cost $14 billion in October 2005.

As of February 2007, the unemployment rate was 9.75%. Despite a slowing global economy, Indonesia's economic growth accelerated to a ten-year high of 6.3% in 2007. This growth rate was sufficient to reduce poverty from 17.8% to 16.6% based on the government's poverty line and reversed the recent trend towards jobless growth, with unemployment falling to 8.46% in February 2008. Unlike many of its more export-dependent neighbours, Indonesia has managed to skirt the recession helped by strong domestic demand (which makes up about two-thirds of the economy) and a government fiscal stimulus package of about 1.4% of GDP. After India and China, Indonesia was the third-fastest growing economy in the G20. With the $512 billion economy expanded 4.4% in the first quarter from a year earlier and last month, the IMF revised its 2009 Indonesia forecast to 3–4% from 2.5%. Indonesia enjoyed stronger fundamentals with the authorities implemented wide-ranging economic and financial reforms, including a rapid reduction in public and external debt, strengthening of corporate and banking sector balance sheets and reducing bank vulnerabilities through higher capitalisation and better supervision.

In 2012, Indonesia's real GDP growth reached 6%, then it steadily decreased below 5% until 2015. After Joko Widodo succeeded SBY, the government took measures to ease regulations for foreign direct investments to stimulate the economy. Indonesia managed to increase their GDP growth slightly above 5% in 2016–2017. However, the government is currently still facing problems such as currency weakening, decreasing exports and stagnating consumer spending. The current unemployment rate for 2019 is at 5.3%.

Between 2019 and 2020, Indonesia's economy faced significant challenges due to the COVID-19 pandemic. The country's GDP contracted by 2.1% in 2020, marking its first annual decline in over two decades. This downturn was attributed to strict public health measures, including large-scale social restrictions (PSBB), which disrupted economic activities, particularly in major urban centres like Jakarta and West Java. Despite these challenges, the government implemented fiscal stimulus packages and social assistance programs to mitigate the pandemic's impact on vulnerable populations. By the third quarter of 2020, signs of recovery emerged, with the pace of economic contraction slowing to 3.5% year-over-year, driven by a partial rebound in consumption and investment.

In 2021, Indonesia's economy began to recover, recording a growth rate of 4.4%, supported by improved domestic demand and positive spillovers from a stronger global economy. The recovery was further bolstered by the government's efforts to accelerate the COVID-19 vaccination rollout and implement policies aimed at boosting economic activity. Growth accelerated to 5.0% in 2022, driven by reduced uncertainty and the assumption that the vaccine rollout would reach a critical mass of the population.

In October 2024, Prabowo Subianto assumed the presidency, inheriting an economy with steady growth but facing structural challenges. His administration introduced ambitious policies aimed at boosting economic growth to 8%, including a $28 billion annual free school meals program and plans to retire all fossil fuel power plants within 15 years. To fund these initiatives, the government implemented significant budget cuts totalling $18.8 billion, affecting various sectors such as public works, education, and health. These austerity measures led to public unrest and raised concerns about the potential impact on infrastructure projects and public services. Additionally, the presence of entrenched criminal networks, known as preman, along with certain mass organisations (ormas), posed significant challenges to foreign investment and economic reforms. These groups have been involved in activities such as extortion, intimidation, and obstruction of industrial operations, particularly in key economic zones like Bekasi, Karawang, and Batam. Such actions have led to financial losses estimated up to $137.8 billion and have deterred potential investors, undermining efforts to create a conducive investment climate.

Between 2019 and 2025, the IDR experienced significant fluctuations influenced by both domestic and global factors. In 2020, during the COVID-19 pandemic, the rupiah weakened sharply, reaching around Rp 16,500 per US dollar due to capital outflows and economic crash. As the economy began to recover in 2021 and 2022, the currency stabilised, trading between Rp 14,000 and Rp 15,000 per dollar. However, in 2023 and 2024, the rupiah faced renewed pressure, depreciating to levels around Rp 16,200 per dollar by April 2024. This depreciation was attributed to political uncertainties ahead of the presidential election and concerns over fiscal policies.

In 2025, the rupiah's performance remained volatile. Early in the year, it reached a five-year low, prompting Bank Indonesia to intervene in the foreign exchange market to stabilise the currency. The central bank maintained its benchmark interest rate at 5.75% in March to support the rupiah and control inflation. By May, with signs of stabilisation, Bank Indonesia cut the rate to 5.50% to stimulate economic growth, as the rupiah had appreciated over 3% from its April lows.

== Data ==
The following table shows the main economic indicators in 1980–2024 (with IMF staff estimates in 2025–2030; 1980-2018 are based on older October 2023 IMF World Economic Outlook database). Inflation under 5% is in green.

| Year | GDP (in Bil. US$PPP) | GDP per capita (in US$ PPP) | GDP (in Bil. US$nominal) | GDP per capita (in US$ nominal) | GDP growth (real) | Inflation rate (in Percent) | Unemployment (in Percent) | Government debt (in % of GDP) |
|---|---|---|---|---|---|---|---|---|
| 1980 | 189.7 | 1,286.3 | 99.3 | 673.2 | ▲9.9% | ▲18.0% | n/a | n/a |
| 1981 | ▲223.4 | ▲1,485.6 | ▲110.8 | ▲737.0 | ▲7.6% | ▲12.2% | n/a | n/a |
| 1982 | ▲242.6 | ▲1,581.6 | ▲113.8 | ▲741.9 | ▲2.2% | ▲9.5% | n/a | n/a |
| 1983 | ▲262.7 | ▲1,679.3 | ▼103.1 | ▼659.5 | ▲4.2% | ▲11.8% | n/a | n/a |
| 1984 | ▲292.7 | ▲1,835.4 | ▲107.2 | ▲672.2 | ▲7.6% | ▲10.5% | 1.6% | n/a |
| 1985 | ▲313.8 | ▲1,929.2 | ▼107.1 | ▼658.2 | ▲3.9% | ▲4.7% | ▲2.2% | n/a |
| 1986 | ▲343.1 | ▲2,068.7 | ▼101.2 | ▼610.2 | ▲7.2% | ▲5.8% | ▲2.8% | n/a |
| 1987 | ▲374.7 | ▲2,215.4 | ▼95.2 | ▼562.9 | ▲6.6% | ▲9.3% | ▼2.6% | n/a |
| 1988 | ▲415.0 | ▲2,406.0 | ▲107.3 | ▲621.9 | ▲7.0% | ▲8.1% | ▲2.9% | n/a |
| 1989 | ▲470.5 | ▲2,674.6 | ▲122.6 | ▲696.9 | ▲9.1% | ▲6.4% | 2.9% | n/a |
| 1990 | ▲532.0 | ▲2,965.9 | ▲138.3 | ▲770.8 | ▲9.0% | ▲7.8% | ▼2.6% | n/a |
| 1991 | ▲599.1 | ▲3,285.4 | ▲154.6 | ▲847.6 | ▲8.9% | ▲9.4% | ▲2.7% | n/a |
| 1992 | ▲652.7 | ▲3,521.1 | ▲168.3 | ▲907.8 | ▲6.5% | ▲7.5% | ▲2.8% | n/a |
| 1993 | ▲721.4 | ▲3,827.8 | ▲190.9 | ▲1,013.1 | ▲8.0% | ▲9.7% | 2.8% | n/a |
| 1994 | ▲792.3 | ▲4,135.8 | ▲213.7 | ▲1,115.6 | ▲7.5% | ▲8.5% | ▲4.5% | n/a |
| 1995 | ▲875.4 | ▲4,495.1 | ▲244.2 | ▲1,254.0 | ▲8.2% | ▲9.4% | ▲7.4% | n/a |
| 1996 | ▲961.2 | ▲4,878.9 | ▲274.7 | ▲1,394.5 | ▲7.8% | ▲8.0% | ▼5.0% | n/a |
| 1997 | ▲1,023.7 | ▲5,136.9 | ▼260.7 | ▼1,308.1 | ▲4.7% | ▲6.2% | ▼4.8% | n/a |
| 1998 | ▼899.3 | ▼4,461.3 | ▼115.3 | ▼572.1 | ▼-13.1% | ▲58.4% | ▲5.5% | n/a |
| 1999 | ▲919.2 | ▲4,507.9 | ▲169.2 | ▲829.6 | ▲0.8% | ▲20.5% | ▲6.4% | n/a |
| 2000 | ▲986.8 | ▲4,784.3 | ▲179.5 | ▲870.2 | ▲5.0% | ▲3.7% | ▼6.1% | 87.4% |
| 2001 | ▲1,045.8 | ▲4,999.0 | ▼174.5 | ▼834.1 | ▲3.6% | ▲11.5% | ▲8.1% | ▼73.7% |
| 2002 | ▲1,109.9 | ▲5,230.8 | ▲212.8 | ▲1,002.9 | ▲4.5% | ▲11.9% | ▲9.1% | ▼62.3% |
| 2003 | ▲1,185.9 | ▲5,510.4 | ▲255.4 | ▲1,186.8 | ▲4.8% | ▲6.8% | ▲9.7% | ▼55.6% |
| 2004 | ▲1,279.0 | ▲5,859.4 | ▲279.6 | ▲1,280.7 | ▲5.0% | ▲6.1% | ▲9.9% | ▼51.3% |
| 2005 | ▲1,394.2 | ▲6,297.4 | ▲310.8 | ▲1,403.9 | ▲5.7% | ▲10.5% | ▲11.2% | ▼42.6% |
| 2006 | ▲1,516.3 | ▲6,752.5 | ▲396.3 | ▲1,764.8 | ▲5.5% | ▲13.1% | ▼10.3% | ▼35.8% |
| 2007 | ▲1,656.1 | ▲7,271.3 | ▲470.1 | ▲2,064.2 | ▲6.3% | ▲6.3% | ▼9.1% | ▲38.1% |
| 2008 | ▲1,813.5 | ▲7,850.3 | ▲558.6 | ▲2,418.0 | ▲7.4% | ▲9.9% | ▼8.4% | ▼30.3% |
| 2009 | ▲1,910.9 | ▲8,155.8 | ▲577.5 | ▲2,465.0 | ▲4.7% | ▲4.8% | ▼7.9% | ▼26.5% |
| 2010 | ▲2,057.2 | ▲8,656.8 | ▲755.3 | ▲3,178.1 | ▲6.4% | ▲5.1% | ▼7.1% | ▼24.5% |
| 2011 | ▲2,229.5 | ▲9,213.2 | ▲892.6 | ▲3,688.5 | ▲6.2% | ▲5.3% | ▼6.6% | ▼23.1% |
| 2012 | ▲2,413.4 | ▲9,833.7 | ▲919.0 | ▲3,744.5 | ▲6.0% | ▲4.0% | ▼6.1% | ▼23.0% |
| 2013 | ▲2,535.0 | ▲10,188.3 | ▼916.6 | ▼3,684.0 | ▲5.6% | ▲6.4% | ▲6.3% | ▲24.9% |
| 2014 | ▲2,622.3 | ▲10,399.0 | ▼891.1 | ▼3,533.6 | ▲5.0% | ▲6.4% | ▼5.9% | ▼24.7% |
| 2015 | ▲2,647.7 | ▼10,359.3 | ▼860.7 | ▼3,367.7 | ▲4.9% | ▲6.4% | ▲6.2% | ▲27.0% |
| 2016 | ▲2,744.9 | ▲10,618.7 | ▲932.1 | ▲3,605.7 | ▲5.0% | ▲3.5% | ▼5.6% | ▲28.0% |
| 2017 | ▲2,894.1 | ▲11,073.5 | ▲1,015.5 | ▲3,885.5 | ▲5.1% | ▲3.8% | ▼5.5% | ▲29.4% |
| 2018 | ▲3,116.6 | ▲11,798.0 | ▲1,042.7 | ▲3,947.2 | ▲5.2% | ▲3.3% | ▼5.2% | ▲30.4% |
| 2019 | ▲3,266.2 | ▲12,236.9 | ▲1,119.1 | ▲4,192.8 | ▲5.0% | ▲2.8% | 5.2% | ▲27.0% |
| 2020 | ▼3,223.4 | ▼11,929.5 | ▼1,059.1 | ▼3,919.5 | ▼-2.1% | ▲2.0% | ▲7.1% | ▲36.1% |
| 2021 | ▲3,530.6 | ▲12,947.9 | ▲1,186.5 | ▲4,351.3 | ▲3.7% | ▲1.6% | ▼6.5% | ▲37.9% |
| 2022 | ▲3,983.1 | ▲14,446.1 | ▲1,319.1 | ▲4,784.2 | ▲5.3% | ▲4.1% | ▼5.9% | ▼37.3% |
| 2023 | ▲4,334.8 | ▲15,553.7 | ▲1,371.2 | ▲4,919.9 | ▲5.0% | ▲3.7% | ▼5.3% | ▼36.9% |
| 2024 | ▲4,662.9 | ▲16,558.3 | ▲1,396.3 | ▲4,958.4 | ▲5.0% | ▲2.3% | ▼4.9% | ▲37.7% |
| 2025 | ▲5,009.5 | ▲17,611.8 | ▲1,443.3 | ▲5,074.0 | ▲5.1% | ▲1.7% | 4.9% | ▲38.6% |
| 2026 | ▲5,358.2 | ▲18,656.9 | ▲1,535.1 | ▲5,398.0 | ▲5.1% | ▲2.5% | ▲5.1% | ▲38.8% |
| 2027 | ▲5,721.6 | ▲19,737.9 | ▲1,649.4 | ▲5,721.6 | ▲4.9% | ▲2.5% | 5.1% | ▲38.9% |
| 2028 | ▲6,130.1 | ▲20,959.1 | ▲1,779.0 | ▲6,130.1 | ▲5.0% | ▲2.5% | 5.1% | ▲39.0% |
| 2029 | ▲6,561.2 | ▲22,959.1 | ▲1,916.7 | ▲6,497.2 | ▲5.1% | ▲2.5% | ▼5.0% | 39.0% |
| 2030 | ▲7,027.1 | ▲23,626,1 | ▲2,065.5 | ▲6,944.5 | ▲5.1% | ▲2.5% | 5.0% | 39.0% |

- Grey colours are estimations

== Structure ==
Indonesia's economy in 2023, as measured by Gross Domestic Product (GDP) at current market prices, reached IDR 20,892.4 trillion. The highest growth on the production side was Transportation and Storage at 13.96%. During 2023, the Indonesian economy continued to grow spatially. The group of provinces according to the islands, the provinces with the highest growth were Maluku and Papua, Sulawesi, and Kalimantan with growth (c-to-c) of 6.94%, 6.37% and 5.43%. Meanwhile, the group of provinces on Jawa Island which contributed 57.05% to the national economy recorded a growth of 4.96% (c-to-c).

=== Composition ===
| Composition | Sector | 2022 output | 2023 output | Constant Growth | Contribution to 2023 output | |
| Composition | Sector | (trillion rupiahs) | | Constant Growth | Contribution to 2023 output | |
|---|---|---|---|---|---|---|
| Agriculture | Agriculture | 2,428.9 | 2,617.7 | 1.30% | 12.53% | 12.53% |
| Industrial | Mining and Quarrying | 2,393.4 | 2,198.0 | 6.12% | 10.52% | 40.18% |
| Industrial | Manufacturing | 3,591.8 | 3,900.1 | 4.64% | 18.67% | 40.18% |
| Industrial | Electricity and Gas | 204.7 | 218.2 | 4.91% | 1.04% | 40.18% |
| Industrial | Water | 12.5 | 13.3 | 4.90% | 0.06% | 40.18% |
| Industrial | Construction | 1,913.0 | 2,072.4 | 4.85% | 9.92% | 40.18% |
| Services | Wholesale and Retail Trade | 2,516.7 | 2,702.4 | 4.85% | 12.94% | 42.91% |
| Services | Transportation and Storage | 983.5 | 1,231.2 | 13.96% | 5.89% | 42.91% |
| Services | Accommodation and Food Services | 472.0 | 526.3 | 10.01% | 2.52% | 42.91% |
| Services | Information and Communication | 812.7 | 883.6 | 7.59% | 4.23% | 42.91% |
| Services | Financial and Insurance Activities | 809.4 | 869.2 | 4.77% | 4.16% | 42.91% |
| Services | Real Estate | 488.3 | 505.5 | 1.43% | 2.42% | 42.91% |
| Services | Business Activities | 341.4 | 383.1 | 8.24% | 1.83% | 42.91% |
| Services | Public Administration and Defense | 604.9 | 616.4 | 1.50% | 2.95% | 42.91% |
| Services | Education | 566.5 | 583.6 | 1.78% | 2.79% | 42.91% |
| Services | Human Health and Social Work | 236.2 | 252.0 | 4.66% | 1.21% | 42.91% |
| Services | Other Services | 354.2 | 405.2 | 10.52% | 1.94% | 42.91% |
| | Tax Less Subsidies | 858.0 | 914.2 | 4.94% | 4.38% | 4.38% |
| Indonesia | Total | 19,588.1 | 20,892.4 | 5.05% | 100.00% | 100.00% |

== Sectors ==
=== Agriculture, aquaculture and forestry ===
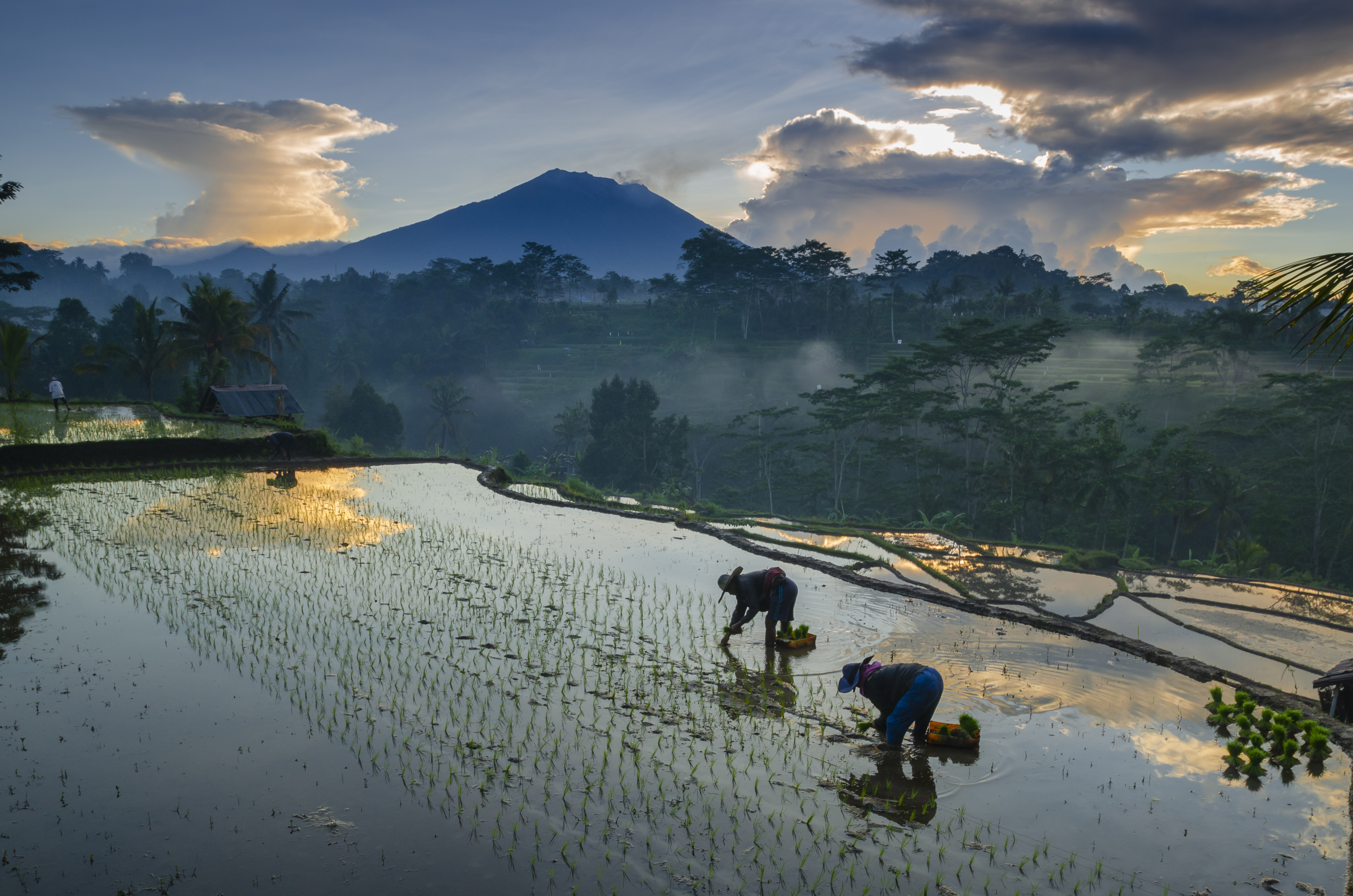
Rice cultivation in Bangli Regency, Bali

Agriculture is a key sector which contributed to 14.43% of GDP. Currently, there are around 30% of the land area used for agriculture and employed about 49 million people (41% of the total workforce). Primary agriculture commodities include rice, cassava (tapioca), peanuts, natural rubber, cocoa, coffee, palm oil, copra; poultry, beef, pork, and eggs. Palm oil production is vital to the economy as Indonesia is the world's biggest producer and consumer of the commodity, providing about half of the world's supply. Plantations in the country stretch across 6 million hectares as of 2007, with a replanting plan set for an additional 4.7 million to boost productivity in 2017. There are a number of negative social and environmental impacts of palm oil production in Southeast Asia.

==== Seafood ====
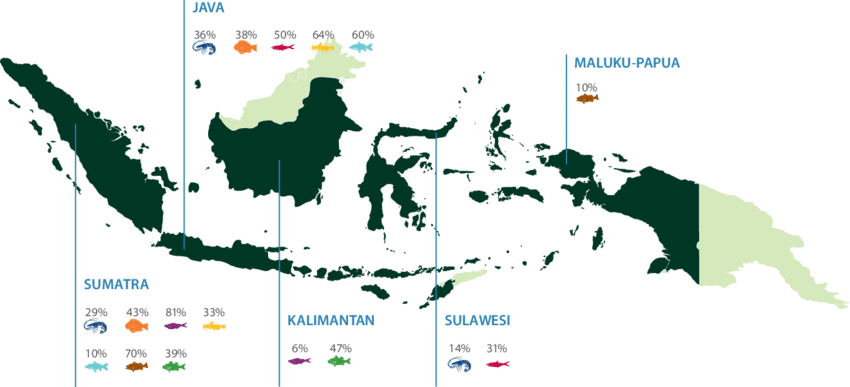
Indonesia aquaculture regions with percentages of national production

In 2015, the total production of seafood reached about 22.31 million metric tons, valued at around 18.10 billion US dollars. For capture of wild fish (both inland and marine), the production trend was steady in 2011–2015, while there was a steep increase in the production from aquaculture during the same period. Indonesia the second most productive country in the world after China.

==== Palm Oil ====
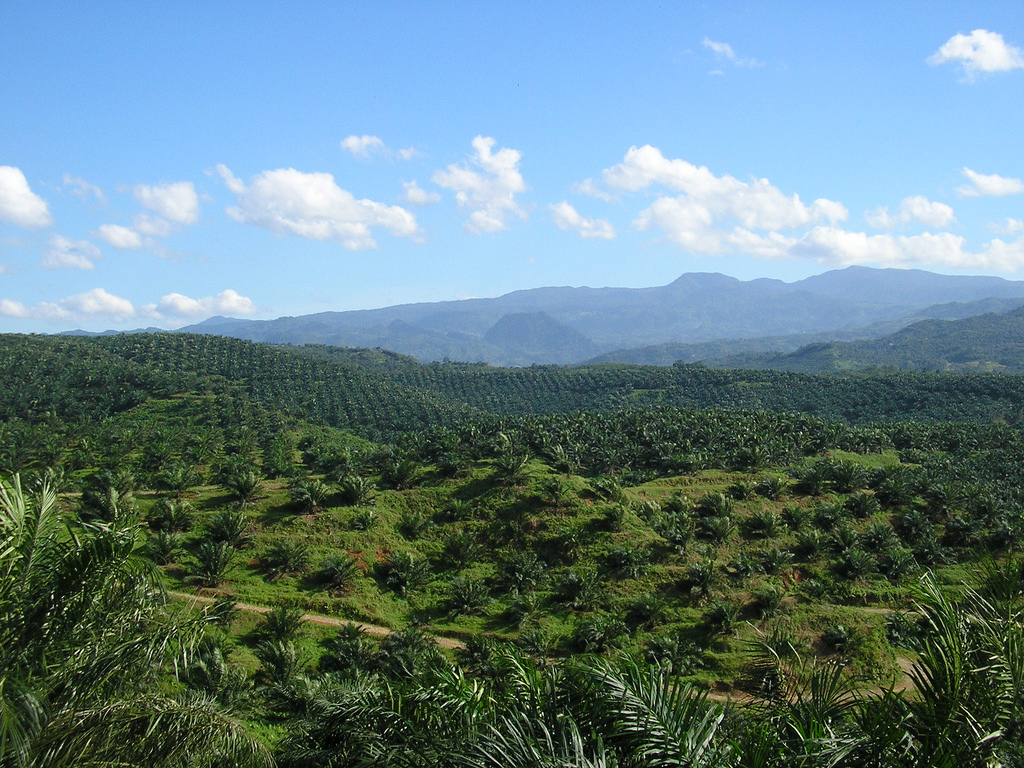
Vast palm oil plantation. Currently, Indonesia is the world's largest producer of palm oil.

Palm oil production is important to the economy of Indonesia as the country is the world's biggest producer and consumer of the commodity, providing about half of the world's supply. In 2016, Indonesia produced over 34.6 million metric tons (34,100,000 long tons; 38,100,000 short tons) of palm oil, and exported 25.1 million metric tons (24,700,000 long tons; 27,700,000 short tons) of it. Generating 4.5% of its GDP and giving employment to 3 million people.

In response to critiques on the industry by environmental and human rights group, efforts are made towards more sustainability of the industry. According to the Roundtable on Sustainable Palm Oil (RSPO), that applies to palm oils which are produced to increase the food supply while keeping in mind the goals to "safeguard social interests, communities and workers" or to "protect the environment and wildlife" for example.

==== Coconut ====
18.5 million tons of coconut is produced each year in Indonesia, and become the largest producer in the world. From ancient folklore to traditional ceremonies, the coconut's symbolism permeates throughout Indonesian mythology and traditions. The tree embodies life-sustaining attributes, often referred to as “The Tree of Life,” symbolising fertility, replenishment and a connection to the divine

=== Industry ===
==== Oil, gas and mining ====
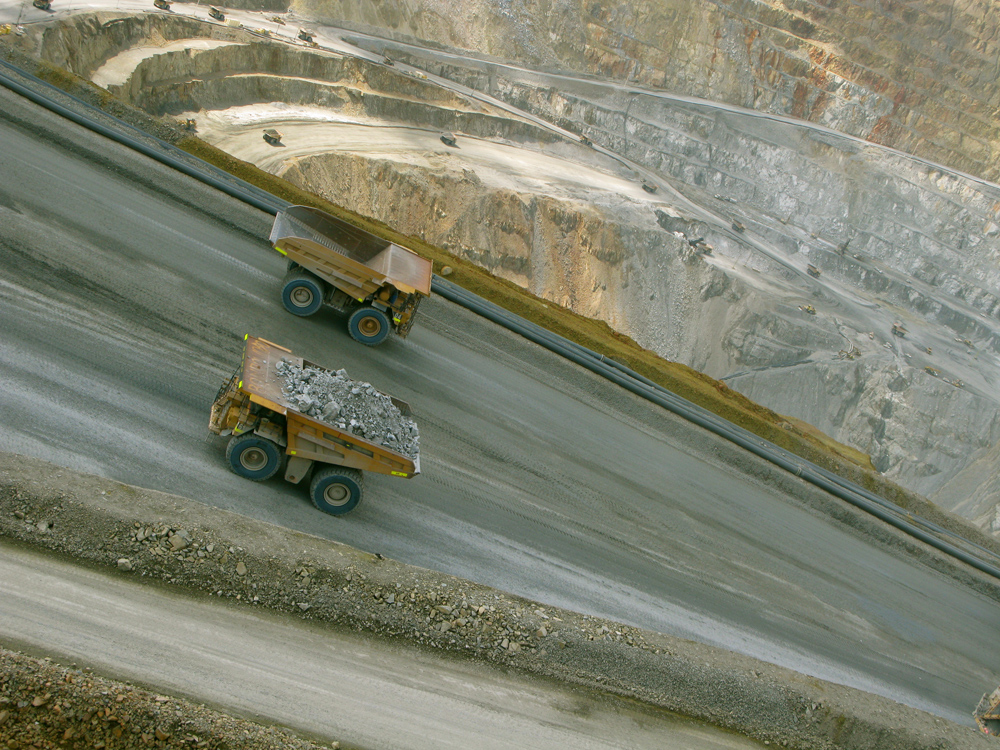
Ore trucks in the mining area in West Sumbawa, West Nusa Tenggara.

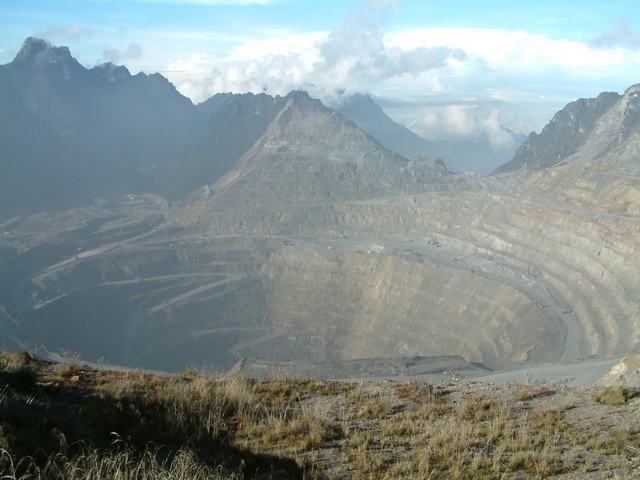
The Grasberg mine has one of the largest reserves of gold and copper in the world. It is located in Mimika Regency, Papua, Indonesia near Puncak Jaya, the highest mountain in the country.

Indonesia was the only South East Asian member of the Organization of Petroleum Exporting Countries (OPEC) until its suspension in 2009. The country currently remains a net oil importer despite its large petroleum production industry. In 1999, crude and condensate output averaged 1.5 million barrels (240,000 m^{3}) per day, and in 1998, the oil and gas sector including refining, contributed approximately 9% to GDP. As of 2005, crude oil and condensate output were 1.07 million barrels (170,000 m^{3}) per day. It indicates a substantial decline from the 1990s, due primarily to ageing oil fields and a lack of investment in oil production equipment. This decline in production has been accompanied by a substantial increase in domestic consumption, about 5.4% per year, leading to an estimated US$1.2 billion cost for importing oil in 2005. The state owns all petroleum and mineral rights. Foreign firms participate through production-sharing and work contracts. Oil and gas contractors are required to finance all exploration, production, and development costs in their contract areas and are entitled to recover operating, exploration, and development costs out of the oil and gas produced. Indonesia had previously subsidised fuel prices to keep prices low, costing US$7 billion in 2004. SBY has mandated a significant reduction of government subsidy of fuel prices in several stages. The government has stated that cuts in subsidies are aimed at reducing the budget deficit to 1% of GDP in 2005, down from around 1.6% last year. At the same time, the government has offered one-time subsidies for qualified citizens, to alleviate hardships.

Indonesia is the world's largest tin market. Although mineral production traditionally centred on bauxite, silver, and tin, it is expanding its copper, nickel, gold, and coal output for export markets. In mid-1993, the Department of Mines and Energy reopened the coal sector to foreign investment, resulting in a joint venture between Indonesian coal producer and BP and Rio Tinto. Total coal production reached 74 million metric tons in 1999, including exports of 55 million tons, and in 2011, production was 353 million. As of 2014, Indonesia is the third-largest producer with a total output of 458 Mt and export of 382 Mt. At this rate, the reserves will be used up in 61 years until 2075. Not all of the productions can be exported due to Domestic Market Obligation (DMO) regulation, which should fulfill the domestic market. In 2012, the DMO was 24.72%. Starting from 2014, no low-grade coal exports are allowed, so the upgraded brown coal process that cranks up the calorie value of coal from 4,500 to 6,100 kcal/kg will be built in South Kalimantan and South Sumatra. Indonesia is also the world's largest producer of nickel, and the second-largest producer of cobalt in 2022.

Two US firms operate three copper/gold mines in Indonesia, with a Canadian and British firm holding significant other investments in nickel and gold, respectively. India's fortune groups like Vedanta Resources and Tata Group also have substantial mining operations in Indonesia. In 1998, the value of Indonesian gold and copper production was $1 billion and $843 million respectively. Receipts from gold, copper, and coal accounted for 84% of the $3 billion earned in 1998 by the mineral mining sector. With the addition of Alumina project that produces 5% of the world's alumina production, Indonesia would be the world's second-largest Alumina producer. The project will not make the ores to become aluminium, as there are 100 types of Alumina derivatives that can be developed further by other companies in Indonesia.

Joko Widodo's administration continued the resource nationalism policy of SBY, nationalising some assets controlled by multinational companies such as Freeport McMoRan, TotalEnergies and Chevron. In 2018, in a move aimed to cut imports, oil companies operating in Indonesia were ordered to sell their crude oil to state-owned Pertamina.

==== Energy ====
Total energy supply 2021
1. Coal (30.3%)
2. Oil (28.9%)
3. Biofuels and Waste (13.8%)
4. Natural gas (14.4%)
5. Wind, Solar, etc. (11.6%)
6. Hydro (0.90%)

Energy consumption by source, Indonesia

Development of CO_{2} emissions

In 2019, the total energy production in Indonesia is 450.79 million tonnes of oil equivalent, with a total primary energy supply of 231.14 million tonnes of oil equivalent and electricity final consumption of 263.32 terawatt-hours. From 2000 to 2021, Indonesia's total energy supply increased by nearly 60%.

Energy use in Indonesia has been long dominated by fossil resources. Once a major oil exporter that joined OPEC in 1962, the country has since become a net oil importer despite still being in OPEC until 2008 and for a short time in 2016, making it the only net oil importer member in the organization. Indonesia is also one of the world's largest coal producers and exporters. In 2024, it was the world's third-largest coal producer, with output increasing to 836 million tonnes. In the same year, Indonesia remained the world's largest coal exporter, exporting 555 million tonnes of coal, primarily thermal coal. Indonesia's coal reserves reached 31.95 billion tonnes in 2024, according to data from the Ministry of Energy and Mineral Resources. In addition, Indonesia has abundant renewable energy potential of 417,8 gigawatt (GW), including solar, wind, hydro, geothermal energy, ocean current, and bioenergy, although only 2,5% have been utilized. Furthermore, Indonesia along with Malaysia, have two-thirds of ASEAN's gas reserves with a total annual gas production of more than 200 billion cubic meters in 2016.

The Government of Indonesia has outlined several commitments to increase clean energy use and reduce greenhouse gas emissions, among other things by issuing the National Energy General Plan (RUEN) in 2017 and joining the Paris Agreement. In the RUEN, Indonesia targets New and Renewable Energy to reach 23% of the total energy mix by 2025 and 31% by 2050. The country also commits to reduce its greenhouse gas emissions by 29% by 2030 against a business-as-usual baseline scenario, and up to 41% by international support. It also has committed to phasing out coal power by 2040s, although numerous challenges remain

Some major renewable projects in Indonesia include the 75 MW wind farm in Sidenreng Rappang Regency, another 72 MW wind farm in Jeneponto Regency, and the Cirata Floating Solar Power Plant in West Java with a capacity of 145 MW which will become the largest Floating Solar Power Plant in Southeast Asia.

Indonesia has significant potential for developing renewable energy, however, the country continues to rely heavily on the use of fossil fuels in domestic electricity production. Continued investment in and reliance on fossil fuels, such as coal, may result in fossil fuels becoming stranded assets, leading to significant investments lost that the country could have received from renewable energy investors. The national electricity company PLN is widely considered to be an obstacle to the development of renewable energy, although it is not clear whether the resistance emanates from the company itself or whether the company is rather an arena for various government bodies and other external actors who resist change.

==== Construction ====
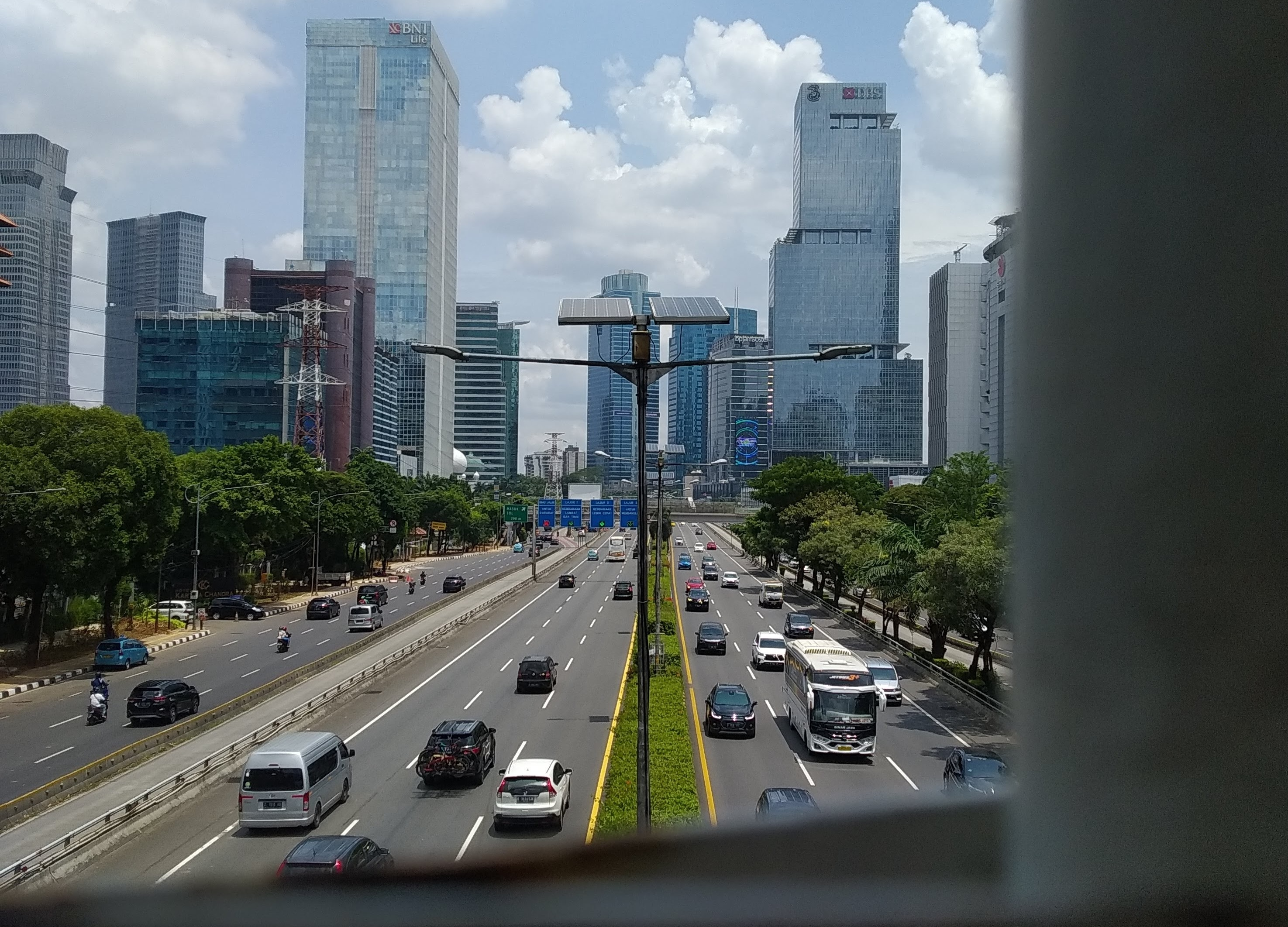
Part of Jakarta Inner Ring Road or Jalan Tol Lingkar Dalam Jakarta in Kuningan, South Jakarta

For 2023, Construction sectors contribution to 9.92% of Indonesia GDP, value at Rp 2,072.4 Trillion IDR or $135.97 Billion USD

The expansion of the construction industry has been catalysed by major capital expenditure projects, and a key factor has been the government's Economic Programme and public-private partnership (PPP) mega-projects like Jakarta-Bandung High Speed Rail, Jakarta MRT, Jabodebek LRT, Trans-Java Toll Road, Trans-Sumatra Toll Road, Nusantara (city), and many more.

==== Manufacturing ====
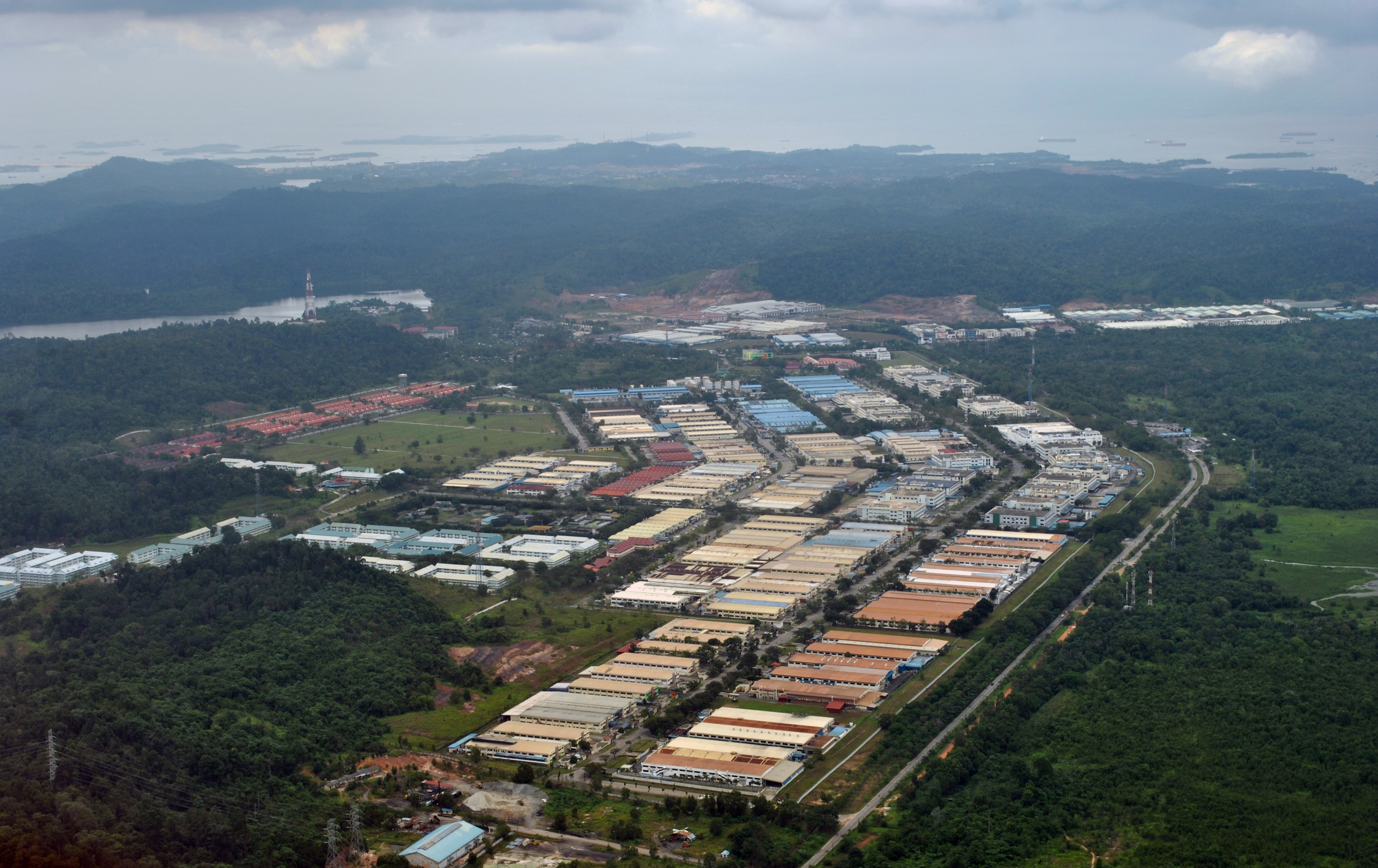
Industrial area in Batam

Indonesia's manufacturing sector has historically played a key role in the country's economic development and now contributes to 20 per cent of GDP.

The government has ambitious plans to propel the country into the top ten biggest economies in the world by 2030, with manufacturing at the heart of this goal. The main areas of production include textiles and garments, food and beverages (F&B), electronics, automotive, and chemicals, with the majority of manufacturers in this sector consisting of micro, small, or medium-sized enterprises. The sector has posted a consistent four per cent growth year-on-year since 2016 and registered 147 trillion rupiah (US$8.9 billion) in investments from January to September 2019.

The Indonesian Textile Association has reported that in 2013, the textile sector is likely to attract investment of around $175 million. In 2012, the investment in this sector was $247 million, of which only $51 million was for new textile machinery. Exports from the textile sector in 2012 were $13.7 billion.

Indonesia recently became the 10th-largest manufacturing nation in the world. Its large manufacturing sector accounts for almost a quarter of the nation's total GDP and employs over a fifth of Indonesia's working age population (around 25 million workers). Put into perspective, Indonesia's manufacturing sector is now larger than the manufacturing sectors of the United Kingdom, Russia and Mexico. Industry sector (including manufacturing) which accounts for 21% of local workers (having become more prominent in recent years). Indonesia's labour pool is estimated at 120 million people, and is growing annually by approximately 2.4 million. As the economy has progressed beyond its predominantly agricultural base to a mixed composition, more workers – particularly women – are now employed in manufacturing and service-related professional industries.

With its rapidly growing middle class and competitive workforce, more foreign investors than ever before are taking advantage of Indonesia's strong manufacturing sector. However, the sector has significant challenges, including intense international competition, particularly from China, increasing labour costs, high transportation and logistics costs, difficulties getting credit, and varying levels of transparency and clarity in regulations.

===== Automotive =====
In 2010, Indonesia sold 7.6 million motorcycles, which were mainly produced in the country with almost 100% local components. Honda led the market with a 50.95% market share, followed by Yamaha with 41.37%. In 2011, the retail car sales total was 888,335 units, a 19.26% increase from last year. Toyota dominated the domestic car market (35.34%), followed by Daihatsu and Mitsubishi Motors with 15.44% and 14.56%, respectively. Since 2011, some local carmakers have introduced some Indonesian national cars which can be categorised as Low-Cost Green Car (LCGC). In 2012, sales increased significantly by 24%, making it the first time that there were more than one million units in automobile sales.

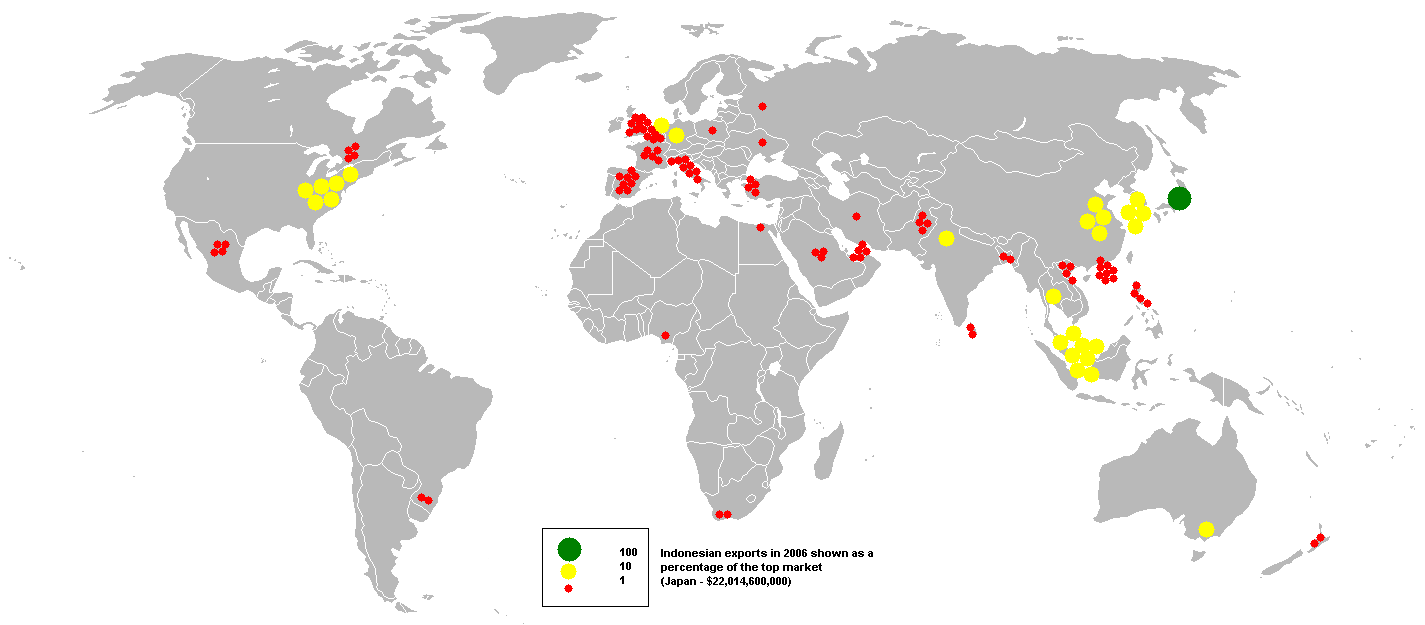
Indonesian export destinations, 2006.

In August 2014, Indonesia exported 126,935 Completely Build Up (CBU) vehicle units and 71,000 Completely Knock Down (CKD) vehicle units, while total production reached 878,000 vehicle units, constituting 22.5% of total output. Automotive export is more than double of its import. By 2020, it is predicted that the automotive exports will be the third after CPO and shoe export. In August 2015, Indonesia exported 123,790 motorcycles. In the same year, Yamaha Motor Company, which exported 82,641, announced to make Indonesia as a base of exporting of its products.

In 2017, the country produced almost 1.2 million motor vehicles, ranking it as the 18th largest producer in the world. Nowadays, Indonesian automotive companies can produce cars with a high ratio of local content (80%–90%).

In 2018, the country produced 1.34 million cars and exported 346,000 cars, mainly to the Philippines and Vietnam.

===== Defense =====
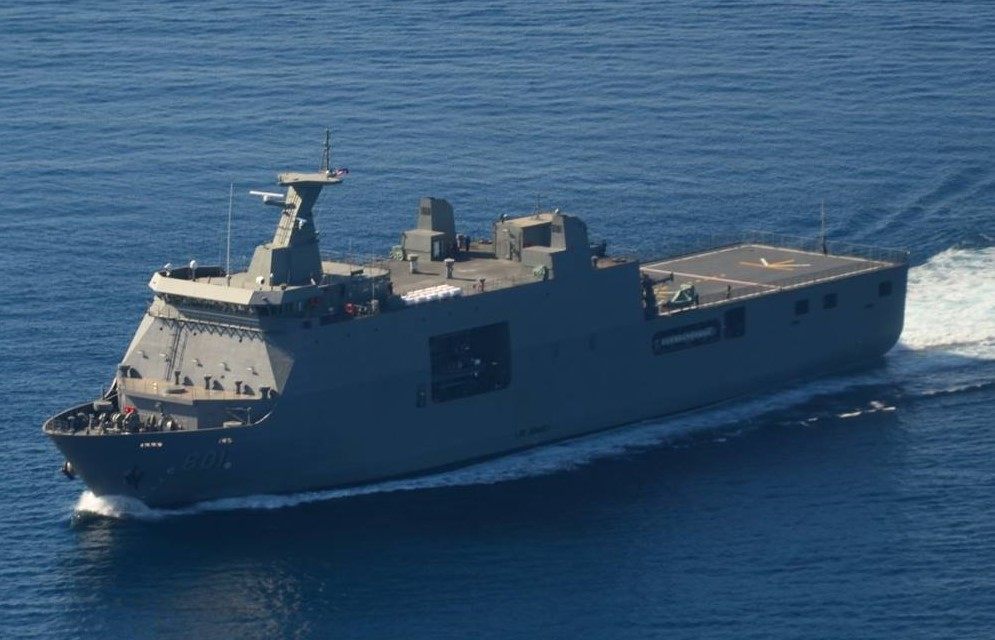
Tarlac-class landing platform dock

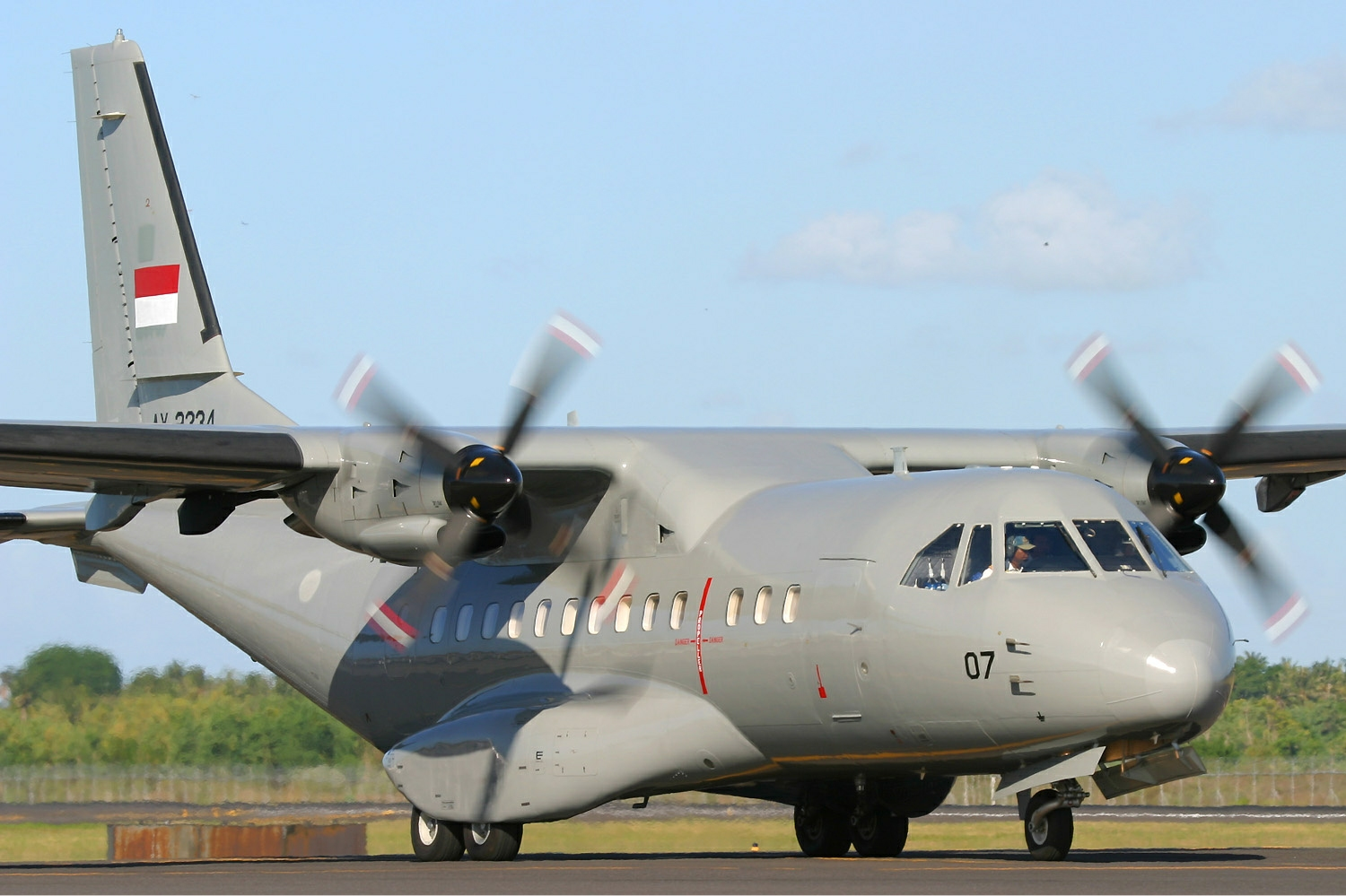
Indonesian Air Force Airtech CN-235 MPA, July 2005

Indonesia's defence industry has been shaped by the need for

- Strategic self-reliance due to arms embargoes in the past (e.g. US embargo in the late 1990s).
- Economic value creation via job creation, technology transfer, and industrial capability.
- Support for Minimum Essential Force (MEF) modernization targets set by the Ministry of Defense.

Indonesia has various companies, with their respective focus area on defence, such as PT Pindad, PT PAL, PT DI, PT Dahana, PT LEN.

| Company | Focus area | Products | Export market |
|---|---|---|---|
| PT Pindad | Weapons & land systems | SS2 rifle, Anoa APC, medium tank | Brunei, Laos, and various African countries |
| PT PAL | Naval shipbuilding | LPD, submarines | Philippines, UAE |
| PT DI | Aerospace | CN-235, N-219 | Pakistan, Senegal |
| PT Dahana | Explosives & propellants | Bombs, rockets | Iran |
| PT LEN | Electronics & radars | Surveillance, C4ISR systems | Domestic uses |

As of MEF 2025, Indonesia plans to produce $1 billion worth of Baykar Bayraktar TB3 and Baykar Bayraktar Akıncı domestically. A contract to acquire 60 TB3s was signed. Minister of Defense of the Republic of Indonesia and the Turkish Defence Industry Agency signed a Memorandum of Understanding (MoU) for 48 KAANs at the Indo Defence Expo & Forum 2024, Jakarta, on 11 June 2025. The total order is planned to be delivered with domestically produced engines in approximately 10 years after the effective signatures are obtained.

=== Services ===
==== Finance and banking ====
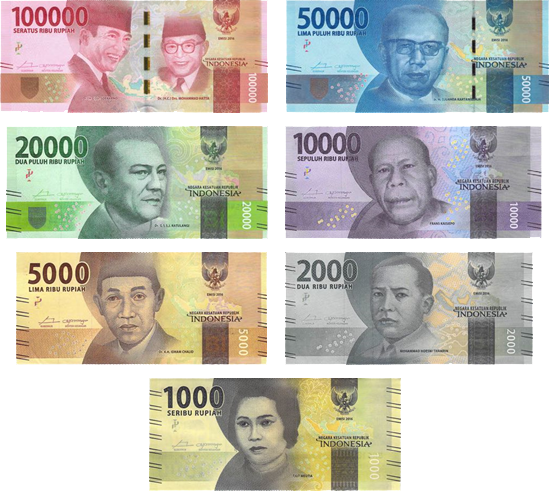
The Indonesian rupiah (IDR) banknotes denominations in circulation since 2016

There are 50 million small businesses in Indonesia, with online usage growth of 48% in 2010. Google announced that it would open a local office in Indonesia before 2012. According to Deloitte in 2011, Internet-related activities have generated 1.6% of the GDP. It is bigger than electronic and electrical equipment exports and liquefied natural gas at 1.51% and 1.45% respectively.

Up to the end of June 2011, the fixed state assets were Rp 1,265 trillion ($128 billion). The value of state stocks was Rp 50 trillion ($5 billion) while other state assets were Rp 24 trillion ($2.4 billion).

In 2015, financial services covered Rp 7,2 trillion. Fifty domestic and foreign conglomerations held around 70.5%. Fourteen of it were vertical conglomerations, 28 were horizontal, and eight are mixed. Thirty-five entities are mainly in the bank industries, 13 were in non-bank industries and one each in special financial industries and capital market industries.

In July 2026, the People's Representative Council passed legislation enabling the establishment of international financial centres intended to attract global banks, wealth managers, family offices, and aircraft and ship leasing companies. Qualifying investors could receive corporate income tax holidays of up to 50 years, while the first centre was projected to attract as much as Rp500 trillion (US$27.9 billion) in investment.

==== Education ====
Interpolated median educational attainment of Indonesia by district (2022)

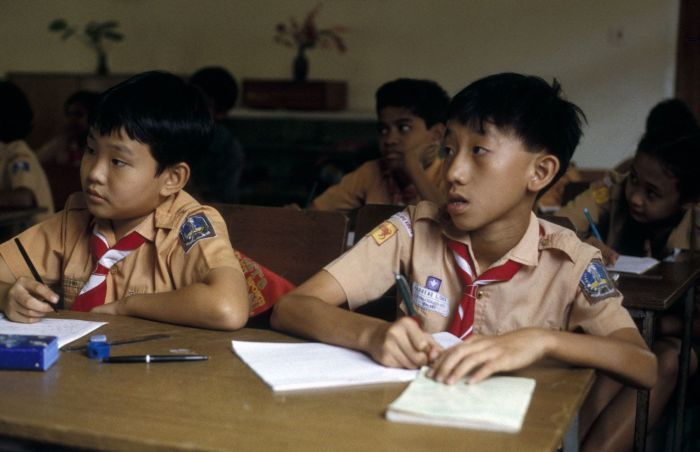
Students wearing the pramuka (scout) uniform studying. This uniform is usually worn on either Wednesday, Thursday, Friday or Saturday.

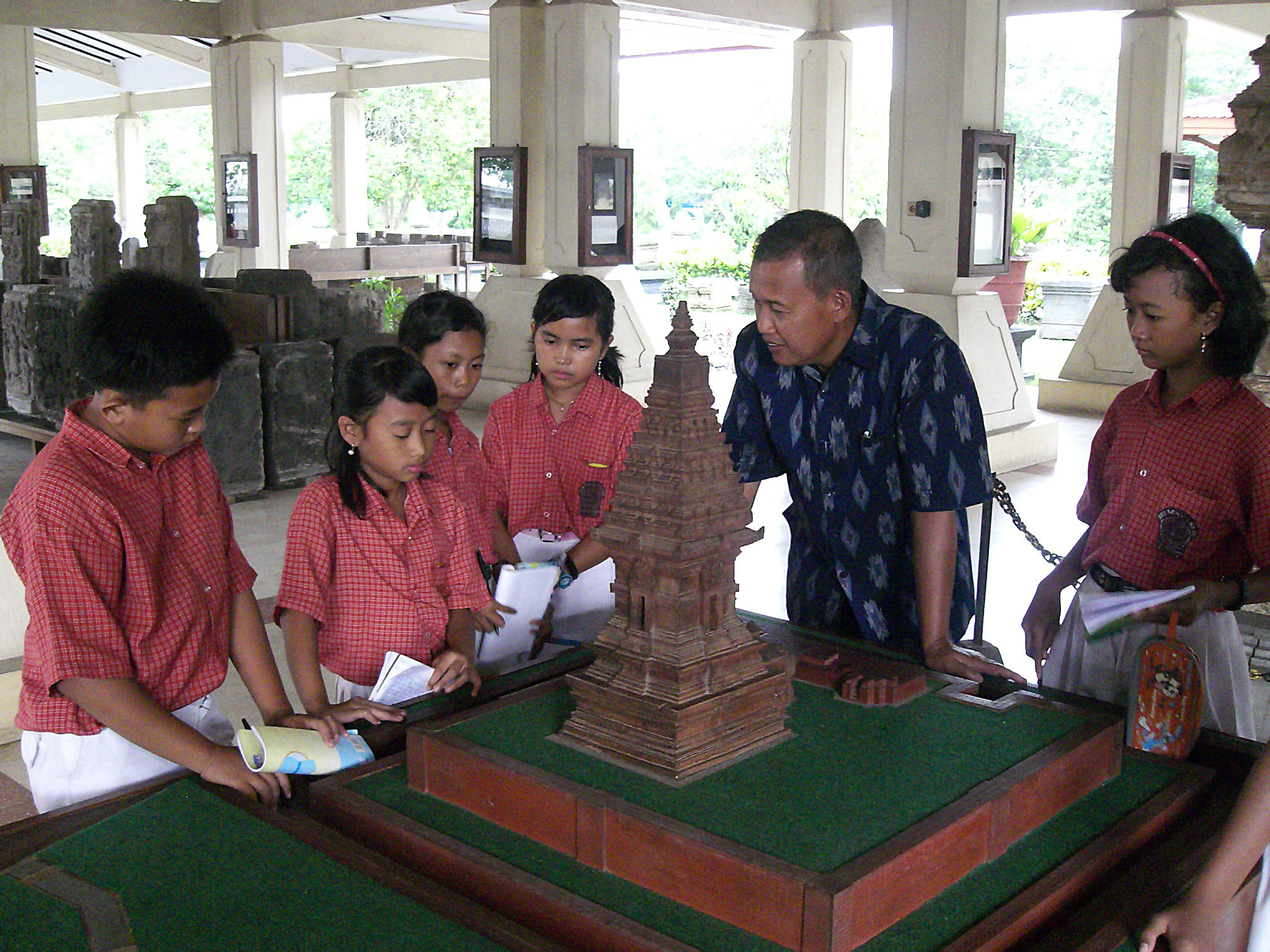
The students pictured above are listening to a guide at the Trowulan Museum, East Java whilst examining a model of the Jawi temple.

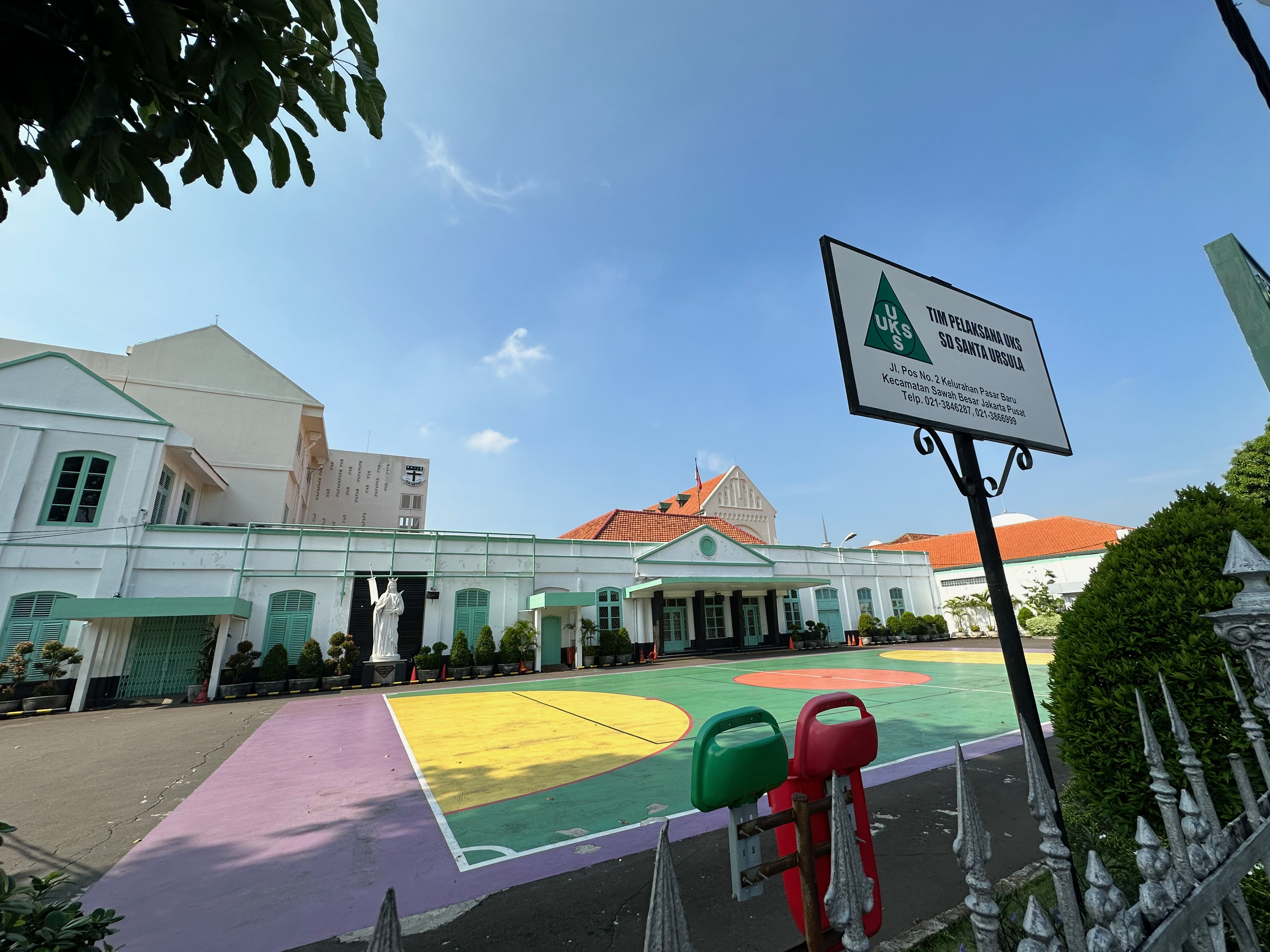
Santa Ursula Catholic School in Jakarta

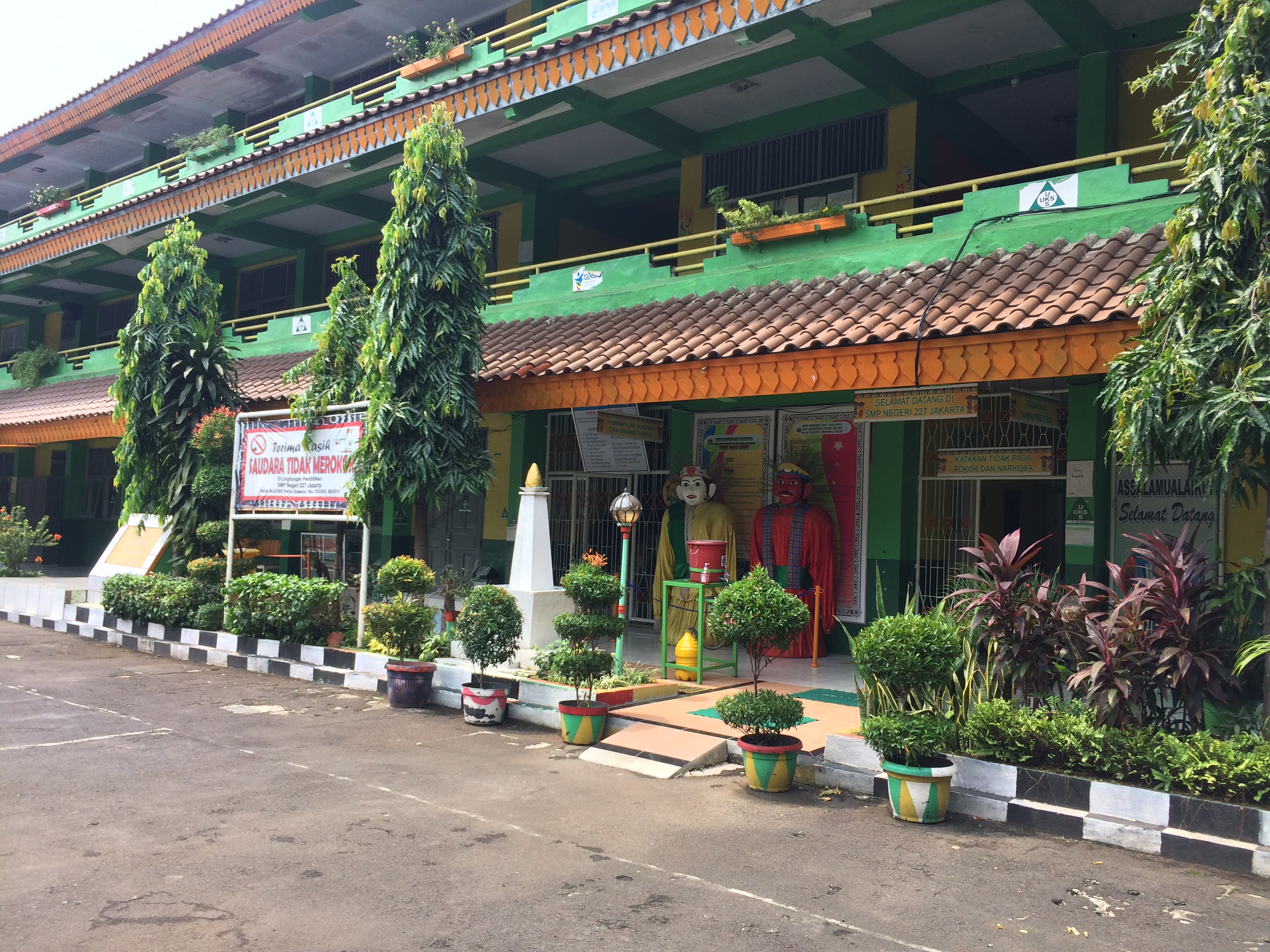
A typical public school in Jakarta

Education in Indonesia falls under the responsibility of the Ministry of Primary and Secondary Education (Kementerian Pendidikan Dasar dan Menengah, or Kemendikdasmen), the Ministry of Higher Education, Science, and Technology (Kementerian Pendidikan Tinggi, Sains, dan Teknologi, or Kemendikti Saintek), and the Ministry of Religious Affairs (Kementerian Agama, or Kemenag). In Indonesia, all citizens must undertake twelve years of compulsory education. This consists of six years at the elementary level and three years each at the middle and high school levels. Islamic, Christian, Hindu, Buddhist, and Confucian schools are under the responsibility of the Ministry of Religious Affairs.

Education is defined by Indonesia's 2003 National Education System Law as a conscious and planned effort to create a learning environment and process so that students can actively develop their potential. The law recognises three educational pathways: formal, non-formal, and informal. Formal education is structured and tiered and comprises basic, secondary, and higher education. Non-formal education is provided outside formal education and may be structured and tiered, while informal education is provided through family and the environment.

Schools in Indonesia are run either by the government (negeri) or the private sector (swasta). Some private schools refer to themselves as "national plus schools", which means that their curriculum exceeds the requirements set by the Ministry of Education, especially by using English as the medium of instruction or having an international-based curriculum instead of the national one. In Indonesia, there are approximately 170,000 primary schools, 40,000 junior-secondary schools, and 26,000 high schools. Eighty-four percent of these schools are under the Ministry of Education and Culture, and the remaining sixteen percent under the Ministry of Religious Affairs.

==== Healthcare ====
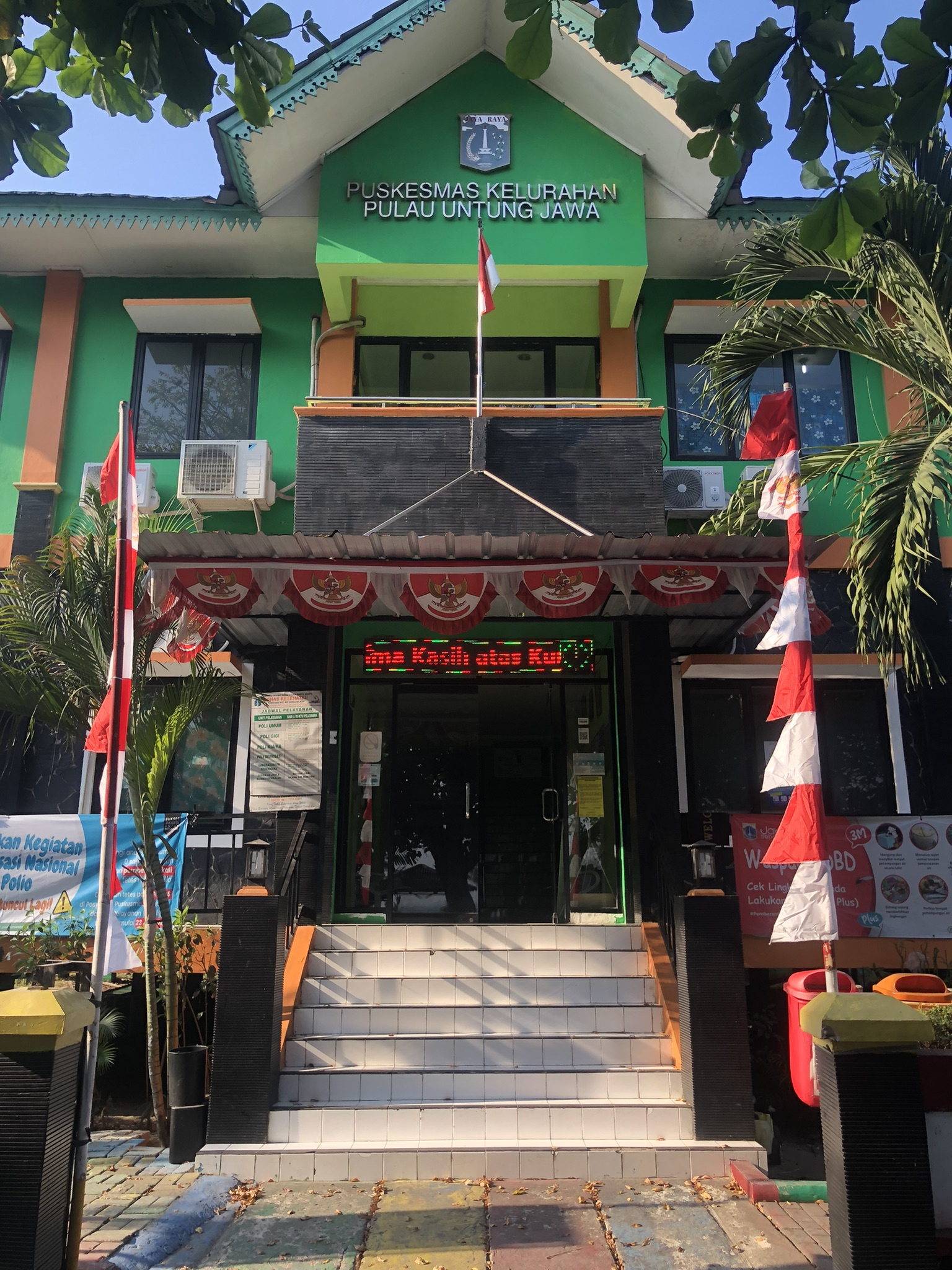
Untung Jawa Island health center (Puskesmas)

Government expenditure on healthcare was about 3.1% of its total gross domestic product in 2018.

==== Housing and real estate ====
Property development news has been mainly focused in Jakarta, the nation’s capital. In the 1970s, Jakarta's governor Lieutenant General Ali Sadikin focused on rehabilitating public services and re-housing. The government were able to provide low cost housing for residents in the low income bracket as well as providing subsidised loans for low cost housing through state owned mortgage banks. Jakarta became the focus of a real estate boom in the late 1980s, however suffered during the Asian financial crisis, to which the city majorly suffered from. However, the market has slowly rejuvenated. Within the residential sector, there is an ever increasing trend of investment into new builds. Many of the ongoing projects are middle-lower and middle-upper class (dominating the market at 73% in 2008). New builds are located in the north of the city. The demand has been increasing as worsening traffic into Jakarta has influenced commuters decisions to move closer to the workplace, many of the new apartment towers are located adjacent to business centers.

==== Water supply and sanitation ====
Water supply and sanitation in Indonesia is characterized by poor levels of access and service quality. More than 16 million people lack access to an at least basic water source and almost 31 million of the country's 285 million population has no access to at least basic sanitation. Only about 2% of people have access to sewerage in Jakarta; this is one of the lowest in the world among middle-income countries. Water pollution is widespread on Bali and Java. Women in Jakarta reportedly spend US$1 per day on boiling water, implying a significant burden for the poor.

In 2005, the estimated level of public investment was only US$2 per capita a year, which was insufficient to expand services significantly and to properly maintain assets. Furthermore, policy responsibilities were fragmented between different Ministries. Since decentralization was introduced in Indonesia in 2001 local governments (districts) gained responsibility for water supply and sanitation. However, this had not translated into an improvement of access or service quality, mainly because devolution of responsibilities had not been followed by adequate fund channeling mechanisms to carry out this responsibility. Local utilities remained underfunded.

The provision of clean drinking water had not yet been taken up as a development priority, particularly at the provincial government level. The lack of access to clean water and sanitation remains a persistent issue, especially in slums and rural areas. This causes concern because lack of clean water reduces the level of hygiene in the communities and it also raises the probability of people contracting diarrheal diseases or other waterborne diseases, especially children. A failure to promote behavior change, particularly among low-income families and slum dwellers, has further worsened the health impact of Indonesia's water and sanitation situation.

==== Telecommunications ====
Communications in Indonesia has a complex history due to the need to reach an extended archipelago of over 17,500 islands. The once important non-electronic communication methods of the past have given way to a considerable telecommunications infrastructure in contemporary Indonesia.

==== Transport ====
Indonesia's transport system has been shaped over time by the economic resource base of an archipelago with thousands of islands, and the distribution of its more than 200 million people concentrated mainly on a single island, Java.

All modes of transport play a role in the country's transport system and are generally complementary rather than competitive. Road transport is predominant, with a total system length of 548,366 kilometres (340,739 miles) in 2020. The railway system has five unconnected networks in Java, Sumatra and Sulawesi primarily dedicated to transport bulk commodities and long-distance passenger traffic.

Sea transport is extremely important for economic integration, as well as for domestic and foreign trade. It is well developed, with each of the major islands having at least one significant port city. The role of inland waterways is relatively minor and is limited to certain areas of Eastern Sumatra and Kalimantan.

The function of air transport is significant, particularly where land or water transport is deficient or non-existent. It is based on an extensive domestic airline network in which all major cities can be reached by passenger plane.

==== Tourism ====
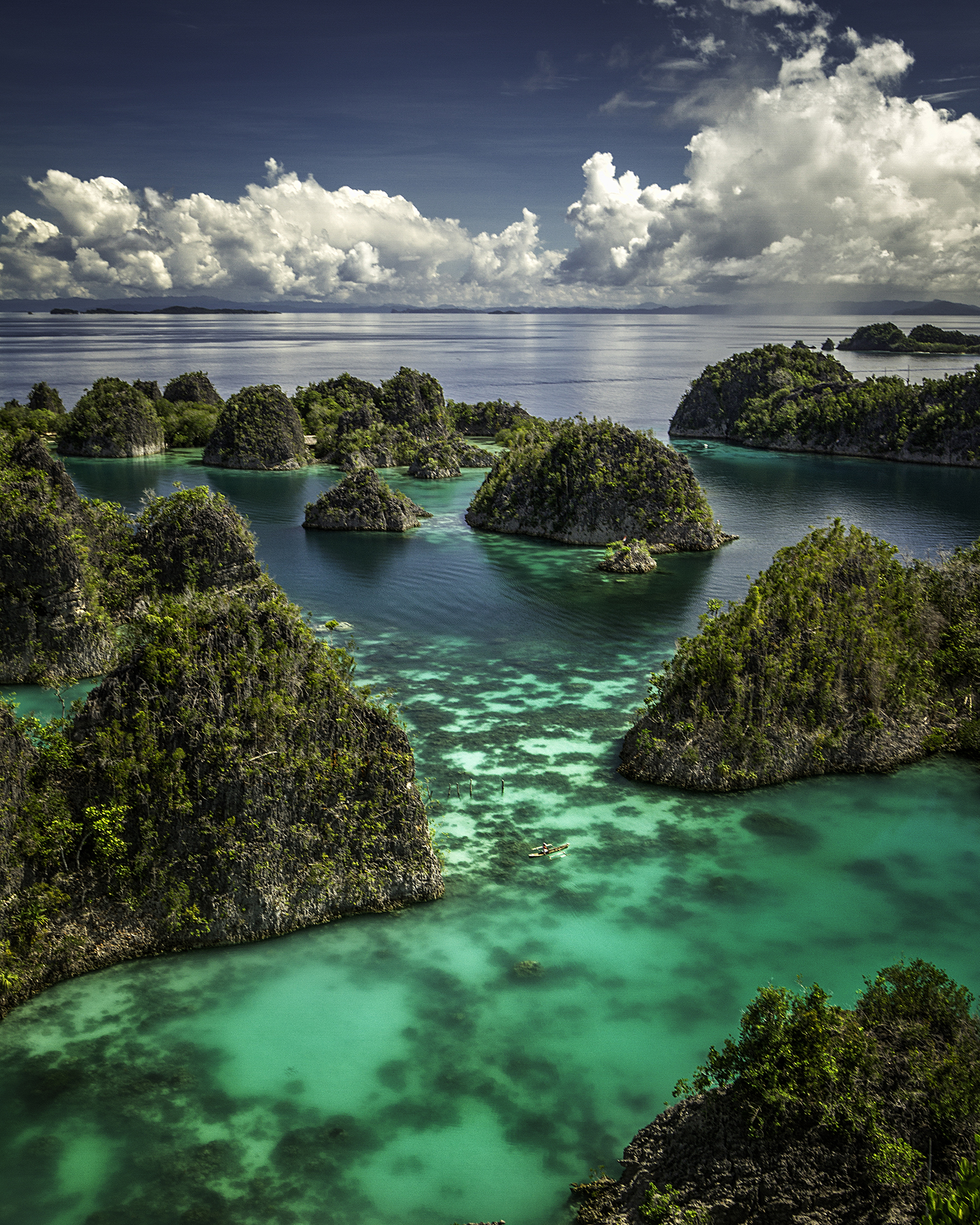
Piaynemo karst archipelago in Raja Ampat, Southwest Papua

Tourism in Indonesia is an important component of the Indonesian economy, as well as a significant source of its foreign exchange revenues. Indonesia ranked 20th in the world tourist industry in 2017, and ninth-fastest among all countries in tourist-sector growth, third-fastest in Asia and fastest in Southeast Asia. In 2018, Denpasar, Jakarta and Batam were among the ten cities globally with the fastest tourism growth at 32.7%, 29.2% and 23.3% respectively. Tourism ranked as the fourth-largest export earner among goods and services sectors.

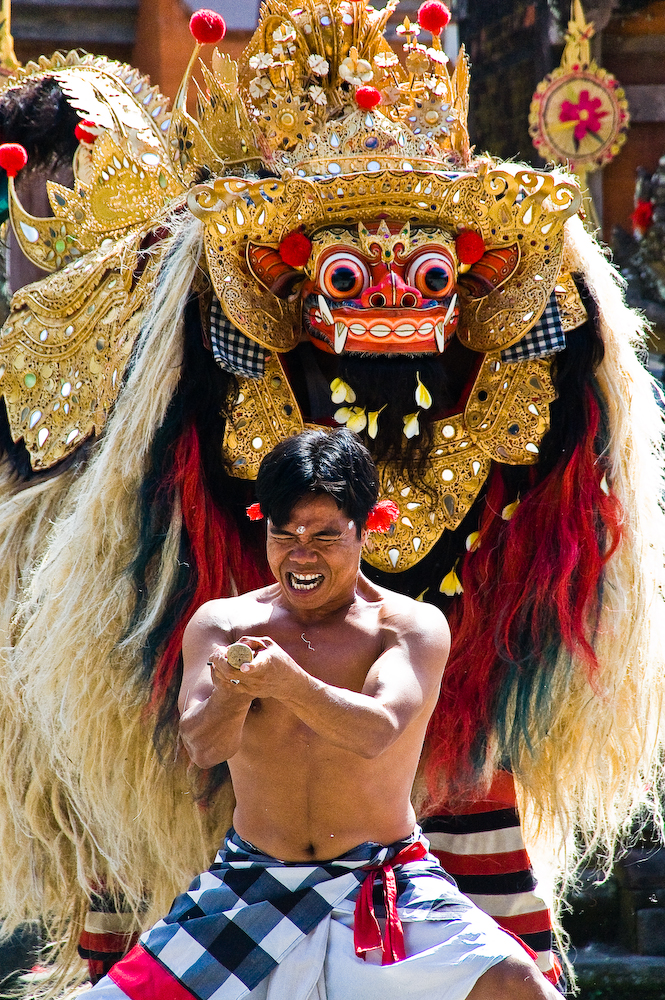
Indonesia possesses a diverse range of traditions, such as this Barong dance performance in Bali.

In 2019, Indonesia recorded 16.10 million foreign tourist arrivals, seeing a 1.9% increase from 2018. In 2015, 9.73 million international visitors entered Indonesia, staying in hotels for an average of 7.5 nights and spending an average of US$1,142 per person during their visit, or $152.22 per person per day. Singapore, Malaysia, China, Australia, and Japan are the top five sources of visitors to Indonesia.

The Travel and Tourism Development Index 2024 ranks Indonesia 22nd out of 119 countries overall with a Travel and Tourism Competitiveness Index score of 4.46. This is an improvement for the Indonesian tourism sector. In 2019, Indonesia ranked 40th out of 140 countries overall with an index score of 4.3. This is also an improvement from Indonesia's 2017 position of 42nd out of 136 countries overall with an index score of 4.2. The 2015 report ranked the price competitiveness of Indonesia's tourism sector 3rd out of 141 countries. The report mentions that Indonesia scored well in the 'T&T Policy and Enabling Conditions' subindex (ranked 9th). The country also scores highly on natural and cultural resources (ranked 17th). However, the country scored poorly in the infrastructure subindex (ranked 75th), as some aspects of tourist service infrastructure are underdeveloped.

In 2016, the Indonesian government was reported to be investing more in tourism development by attracting more foreign investors. The government has given priority to 10 areas as follows: Borobudur, Central Java; Mandalika, West Nusa Tenggara; Labuan Bajo, East Nusa Tenggara; Bromo-Tengger-Semeru, East Java; Thousand Islands, Jakarta; Lake Toba, North Sumatra; Wakatobi, Southeast Sulawesi; Tanjung Lesung, Banten; Morotai, North Maluku; and Tanjung Kelayang, Bangka Belitung Islands. As quoted in the newspaper The Jakarta Post, the government is aiming for 275 million trips from domestic tourists by the end of 2019. The government has also secured commitments from potential investors, totalling $70 million for building accommodations, marinas and ecotourism facilities in 3 of the prioritised 10 areas. Indonesia was ranked seventh among travel publisher Lonely Planet's top 10 countries to visit in 2019. The country ranked fourth among the top 25 destinations in the world in 2018 by the travel site TripAdvisor.

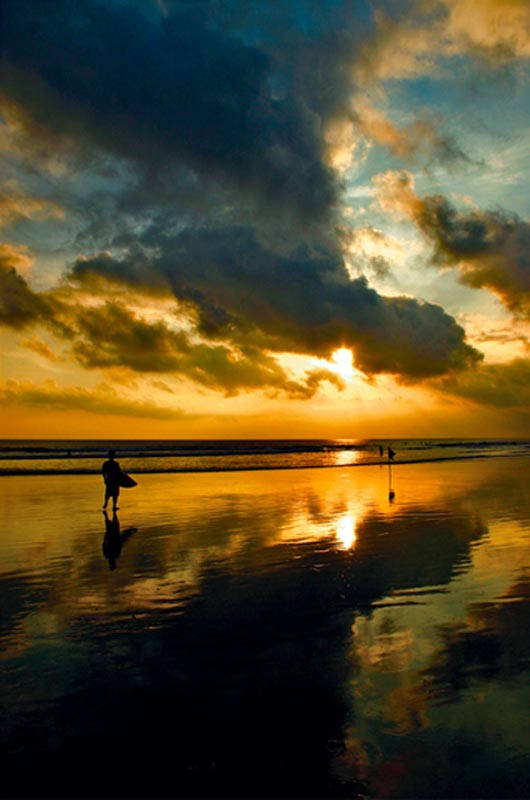
Jimbaran Beach, Bali

==== Foreign labour ====
In 2011, Indonesia released 55,010 working visas for foreigners, an increase of 10% compared to 2010, while the number of foreign residents in Indonesia, excluding tourists and foreign emissaries was 111,752, rose by 6% compared to last year. Those who received visas for six months to one year were mostly Chinese, Japanese, South Koreans, Indians, Americans and Australians. A few of them were entrepreneurs who made new businesses. Malaysia is the most common destination of Indonesian migrant workers (including illegal workers). In 2010, according to a World Bank report, Indonesia was among the world's top ten remittance-receiving countries with a value totalling $7 billion. In May 2011, six million Indonesian citizens were working overseas, 2.2 million of whom reside in Malaysia and another 1.5 million in Saudi Arabia.

=== Science and technology ===
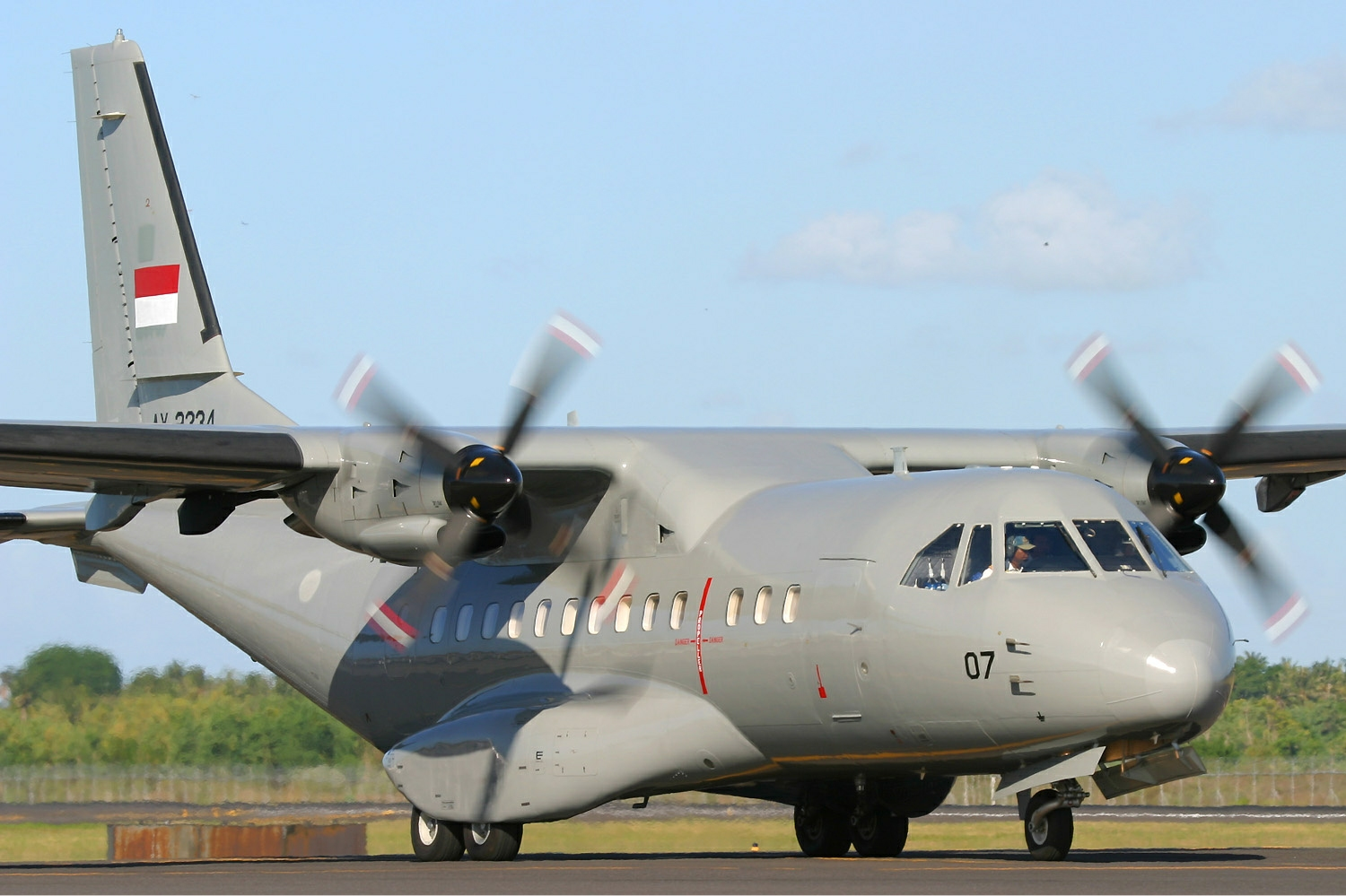
The CASA/IPTN CN-235 is a medium-range twin-engined transport plane that was jointly developed by CASA of Spain and IPTN of Indonesia as a regional airliner and military transport.

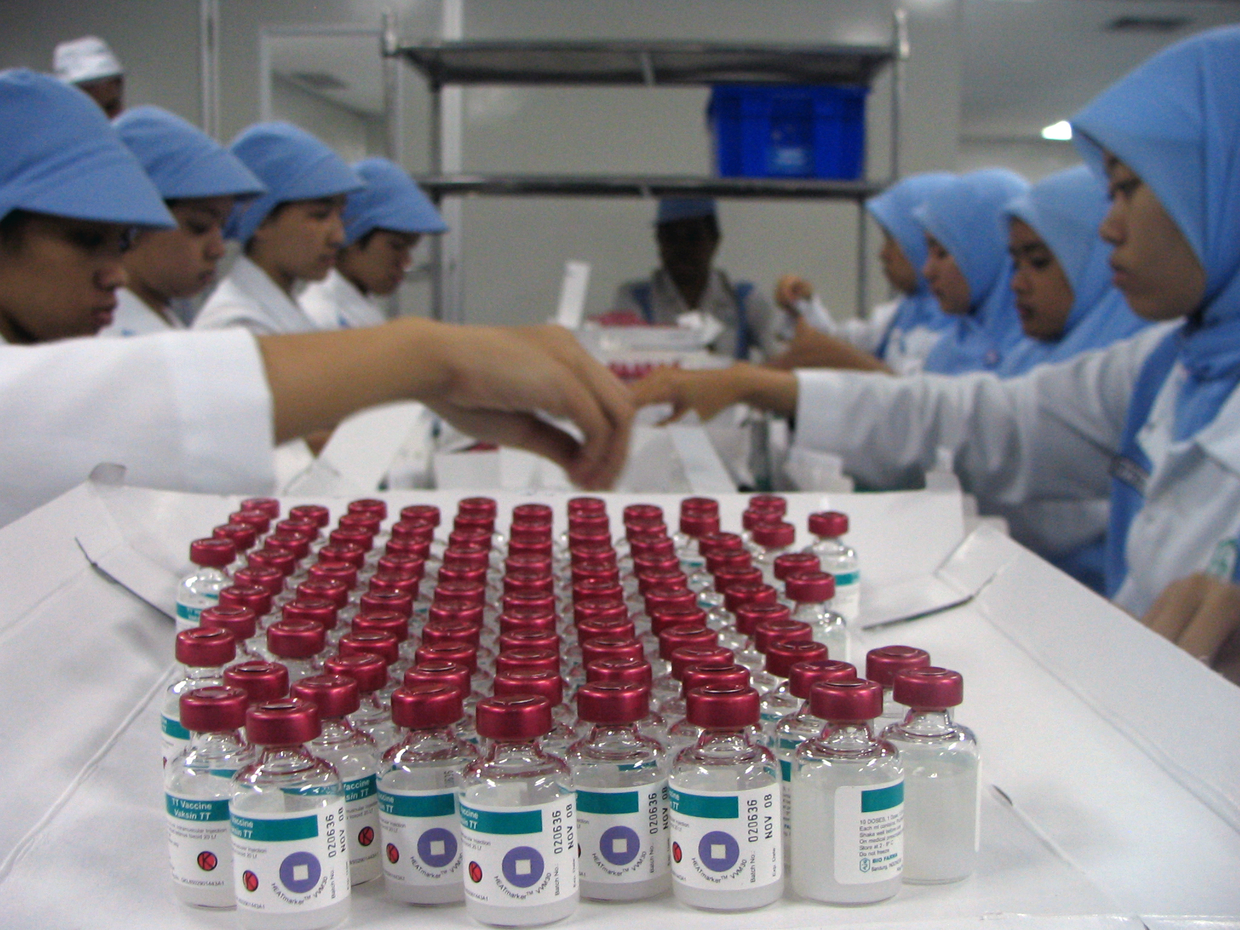
Vaccine vials in Bio Farma, Bandung

Although Indonesia is not considered one of the leading countries in science and technology developments, there are numerous scientific and technological innovations, developments, and achievements contributed by Indonesians. Despite being a developing country, Indonesia is one of a handful nations that have developed their own aerospace technology.

Since the Joko Widodo administration, scientific and technological development in Indonesia became one aspect subjected to reform. Currently, after the 2021 reform in Indonesia's scientific and technological affairs, the republic's Ministry of Education, Culture, Research and Technology is the official body in charge of scientific and technological development in the nation after the disbandment of the Ministry of Research and Technology. The government of Joko Widodo also established the National Research and Innovation Agency (BRIN), as the country's sole multidisciplinary sciences, research, and technological development superagency, replacing the Indonesian Institute of Sciences (LIPI) and other state research and development agencies.

Since 2018, the Indonesian government increased their research and development allocation. In 2018, the government allocated Rp33 trillion (approximately US$2,317,985,439 as on 6 September 2021). In 2019, the government allocated Rp35 trillion (approximately US$2,458,469,405 as on 6 September 2021). In 2020, the government allocated Rp36 trillion (approximately US$2,528,712,000 as on 6 September 2021) for research and development. While it has increased over years, it still holds a very small share of roughly 0.31% of Indonesia's gross domestic product. Not only that, the private sector's contributions to Indonesia research are very low. In 2020, 83.88% of research funding relied on the government, followed by universities (2.65%), business companies (9.15%), and private non-profit groups (4.33%).

== Regional economies ==
=== GDP by provinces ===
There are 34 provinces in Indonesia. Below are the top 15 provinces in Indonesia ranked by GDP in 2019:

| Rank | Province | Region | GDP (in billion Rp) | GDP nominal | GDP PPP |
| Rank | Province | Region | GDP (in billion Rp) | (in billion $) | (in billion $) |
|---|---|---|---|---|---|
| - | Indonesia | South East Asia | 16,073,257 | 1,136.72 | 3,329.17 |
| 1 | Jakarta | Java | 2,840,828 | 200.91 | 588.42 |
| 2 | East Java | Java | 2,352,425 | 166.37 | 487.27 |
| 3 | West Java | Java | 2,125,158 | 150.30 | 440.19 |
| 4 | Central Java | Java | 1,362,457 | 96.35 | 282.18 |
| 5 | North Sumatra | Sumatra | 801,733 | 56.70 | 166.06 |
| 6 | Riau | Sumatra | 765,198 | 54.12 | 158.51 |
| 7 | Banten | Java | 664,963 | 47.03 | 137.74 |
| 8 | East Kalimantan | Kalimantan | 653,677 | 46.23 | 135.40 |
| 9 | South Sulawesi | Sulawesi | 504,747 | 35.70 | 104.56 |
| 10 | South Sumatra | Sumatra | 455,233 | 32.19 | 94.28 |
| 11 | Lampung | Sumatra | 360,664 | 25.51 | 74,71 |
| 12 | Riau Islands | Sumatra | 268,080 | 18.96 | 55.53 |
| 13 | Bali | Lesser Sunda Islands | 252,598 | 17.86 | 52.31 |
| 14 | West Sumatra | Sumatra | 246,423 | 17.42 | 51.01 |
| 15 | Jambi | Sumatra | 217,712 | 15.40 | 45.10 |

== Foreign economic relations ==
=== Trade statistics ===
Exports of Indonesia by product category (2019) Chemical products Transportation Machines Mineral products Plastics and rubbers Metals Foodstuffs Precious metals Textiles Instruments Animal products Vegetable products Paper goods Footwear and headwear Miscellaneous Stone and glass Wood products Animal and vegetable bi-products Animal hides Arts and antiques Weapons

| Year | Goods exports (billion US$) | Goods imports (in billion US$) | Net trade (in billion US$) |
|---|---|---|---|
| 2023 | ▲$257.7 | ▲$211.5 | ▲$46.2 |
| 2020 | ▲$163.4 | ▲$135.1 | ▲$28.3 |
| 2015 | ▼$149.1 | ▲$135.1 | ▲$14.1 |
| 2010 | ▲$150.0 | ▲$118.9 | ▲$31.0 |
| 2000 | ▲$65.4 | ▲$40.4 | ▲$25.0 |
| 1990 | ▲$26.8 | ▲$21.5 | ▲$5.4 |

=== ASEAN ===
Until the end of 2010, intra-ASEAN trade was still low as trade involved mainly exports to countries outside the region, with the exception of Laos and Myanmar, whose foreign trade was ASEAN-oriented. In 2009, realised foreign direct investment (FDI) was US$37.9 billion and increased two-fold in 2010 to US$75.8 billion.

The ASEAN Framework Agreement on Trade in Services (AFAS) was adopted at the ASEAN Summit in Bangkok in December 1995. Under the agreement, member states enter into successive rounds of negotiations to liberalise trade in services with the aim of submitting increasingly higher levels of commitment. ASEAN has concluded seven packages of commitments under AFAS.

Mutual Recognition Agreements (MRAs) have been agreed upon by ASEAN for eight professions: physicians, dentists, nurses, architects, engineers, accountants, surveyors, and tourism professionals. Individuals in these professions will be free to work in any ASEAN states effective 31 December 2015.

In addition, six member states (Malaysia, Vietnam (2 exchanges), Indonesia, Philippines, Thailand, and Singapore) have collaborated on integrating their stock exchanges, which includes 70% of its transaction values with the goal to compete with international exchanges.

Single market will also include the ASEAN Single Aviation Market (ASEAN-SAM), the region's aviation policy geared towards the development of a unified and single aviation market in Southeast Asia. It was proposed by the ASEAN Air Transport Working Group, supported by the ASEAN Senior Transport Officials Meeting, and endorsed by the ASEAN Transport Ministers. It is expected to liberalise air travel between member states allowing ASEAN airlines to benefit directly from the growth in air travel, and also free up tourism, trade, investment, and service flows. This policy supersedes existing unilateral, bilateral, and multilateral air services agreements among member states which are inconsistent with its provisions.

=== Japan ===
Indonesia and Japan signed the Indonesia–Japan Economic Partnership Agreement (IJEPA), which had come into effect on 1 July 2008. The agreement was Indonesia's first bilateral free-trade agreement to ease the cross-border flow of goods and people as well as investment between both countries. In 2012, there were between 1,200 and 1,300 Japanese corporates operating in Indonesia, with some 12,000 Japanese nationals living in Indonesia. Japan has been investing in Indonesia for decades, particularly in the automotive, electronic goods, energy, and mining sectors. Prior to the formation of the Indonesian Republic, the Japanese had viewed Indonesia as an important source of natural resources. The Japanese need of natural resources was among the reasons that led the nation to advance further to the south in their military conquests during World War II. Today Indonesia is Japan's major supplier for natural rubber, liquefied natural gas, coal, minerals, paper pulp, seafood such as shrimp and tuna, and coffee. Traditionally Indonesia has been regarded as a major market of Japanese automotive and electronic goods. For Japanese businesses, Indonesia has been a location for low-cost manufacturing operations as well as being the source of various natural resources required by those operations. Approximately 1,000 Japanese companies operate in Indonesia which employ approximately 300,000 people. Major Japanese factories are concentrated east of Jakarta with high concentrations in Bekasi, Cikarang and Karawang, West Java.

=== China ===
Trade with China has increased since the 1990s, and in 2014, China became Indonesia's second-largest export destination after Japan. Trade between China and Indonesia is on the rise, especially after the implementation of ACFTA since early 2010. Indeed, while in 2003 trade between Indonesia and China reached only US$3.8 billion, in 2010 it multiplied almost 10 times and reached US$36.1 billion. China's transformation into Fastest growing country in the 21st century has led to an increase of foreign investments in the bamboo network, a network of overseas Chinese businesses operating in the markets of Southeast Asia that share common family and cultural ties. However the free trade with China has caused much anxiety in Indonesia, since inflows of cheap products from China could harm Indonesian industry. Indonesian private sector and civil society organizations vigorously lobbied the Indonesian government and members of parliament, insisting that Indonesia should either pull out of the agreement or renegotiate its terms with Beijing.

China has remained on top of Indonesia's key major trading partners, serving as the country's largest export and import market. China serves as Indonesia's largest export destination after overtaking Japan and United States, reaching US$16.8 billion. China is also Indonesia's most important source of imports, reaching US$30.8 billion, or 22.7% of Indonesian imports in 2016. The balance however was in favour of China as Indonesia booked a trade deficit of US$14 billion in 2016.

From China's perspective, since 2010 ASEAN as a whole has become its fourth-largest trading partner after the European Union, Japan and the United States. Among ASEAN member countries, Indonesia was China's fourth-largest trading partner, which, according to data as of May 2010 from the Ministry of Commerce of the People's Republic of China, amounted to US$12.4 billion, after Malaysia (US$22.2 billion), Singapore (US$17.9 billion) and Thailand (US$15.7 billion). With China's economic rise, Indonesia has been intensifying its trade relationship with China to counterbalance its ties with the West. By 2020, China had become Indonesia's largest export destination.

=== South Korea ===
In the past, the relations were only developed around trade and investments, such as the forestry and garment sectors. Today the cooperation has been expanded to a number of mega projects and advanced industries. With US$27 billion in bilateral trade, South Korea became the fourth biggest trading partner of Indonesia in 2012. It became the third-biggest foreign investor in Indonesia, with US$1.94 billion in investment.

There are large numbers of South Korean companies that have been investing and operating in Indonesia, such as Miwon (Daesang Corporation), Lotte, Yong Ma, Hankook, Samsung, LG, Kia and Hyundai. In 2011, Hankook announced a US$353 million investment into a production plant located in Bekasi, West Java, Indonesia.

In 2019, trade between Indonesia and South Korea was worth $15.65 billion, and between 2015 and 2019 South Korean companies invested nearly $7 billion in Indonesia. In December 2020, Indonesia and South Korea signed a comprehensive economic partnership. It is equivalent to a free trade agreement, though focuses on a broader scope of economic cooperation. Under the deal, Indonesia will scrap 94.8% of tariffs on South Korean products while South Korea will scrap 95.8% of tariffs on Indonesian products.

=== United States ===
At the beginning of the post-Suharto era, US exports to Indonesia in 1999 totaled $2 billion, down significantly from $4.5 billion in 1997. The main exports were construction equipment, machinery, aviation parts, chemicals, and agricultural products. US imports from Indonesia in 1999 totaled $9.5 billion and consisted primarily of clothing, machinery and transportation equipment, petroleum, natural rubber, and footwear. Financial assistance to Indonesia is coordinated through the Consultative Group on Indonesia (CGI) formed in 1989. It includes 19 donor countries and 13 international organizations that meet annually to coordinate donor assistance. In 2019, as Indonesia's share of global trade exceeded 0.5 percent, the United States Trade Representatives decided not to classify Indonesia as a "developing country." Despite a revocation of this status, the Indonesian government has assured that this would not change the current Generalized System of Preferences facilities that Indonesia had enjoyed from the United States.

=== European Union ===
The EU and Indonesia have built robust commercial relations, with bilateral trade amounting to approximately €25 billion in 2012 resulting in a sizeable €5.7 billion trade surplus for Indonesia with the EU. In the past few years trade between EU and Indonesia has been marked by an upward trend. Whereas total trade was worth almost €16 billion in 2009, by 2011 it had already reached €23.5 billion. For the EU, Indonesia is the 24th largest import source (share 0.9%) and the 30th largest export destination (share 0.6%). Inside the ASEAN-region, Indonesia ranks fourth in terms of total trade. The EU is Indonesia's 4th largest trading partner after Japan, China and Singapore, representing almost 10% of its total external trade. The EU is the second largest investor in the Indonesian economy. Indonesia mostly exports to the EU agricultural products and processed resources, mainly palm oil, fuels and mining products, textiles and furniture. EU exports to Indonesia consist mainly of high-tech machinery and transport equipment, chemicals and various manufactured goods. Essentially, trade flows between Indonesia and the EU complement each other. After negotiations on a free trade agreement with ASEAN got increasingly difficult, the EU began pursuing negotiations with individual ASEAN states. The EU and Indonesia are currently working towards an ambitious Comprehensive Economic Partnership Agreement covering trade, investment and services.

=== India ===
On 25 January 2011, after talks by Indian Prime Minister Manmohan Singh and visiting President of Indonesia Susilo Bambang Yudhoyono, India and Indonesia had signed business deals worth billions of dollars and set an ambitious target of doubling trade over the next five years. India also has further economic ties with Indonesia through its free trade agreement with ASEAN, of which Indonesia is a member. The two countries target to achieve bilateral trade of $25 billion by 2015, with cumulative Indian investments of $20 billion in Indonesia.

== Free trade efforts ==
=== International trade agreements ===
| Economy | Agreement | Abbreviation | Negotiations Launched | Signed | Effective | Legal text |
|---|---|---|---|---|---|---|
| Australia | Indonesia–Australia Comprehensive Economic Partnership Agreement | IACEPA | 26 December 2012 | 4 March 2019 | 5 July 2020 | |
| Canada | Indonesia–Canada Comprehensive Economic Partnership Agreement | ICACEPA | 20 June 2021 | 24 September 2025 | | |
| Chile | Indonesia–Chile Comprehensive Economic Partnership Agreement | ICCEPA | May 2014 | 14 December 2017 | 8 October 2019 | |
| EAEU | Indonesia–EAEU Free Trade Agreement | IEAEUFTA | 3 April 2023 | 21 December 2025 | | |
| EFTA | Indonesia–EFTA Comprehensive Economic Partnership Agreement | IECEPA | 31 January 2011 | 16 December 2018 | 1 November 2021 | |
| EU | Indonesia–EU Comprehensive Economic Partnership Agreement | IEUCEPA | 18 July 2016 | 23 September 2025 | 1 January 2027 | |
| Iran | Indonesia–Iran Preferential Trade Agreement | IIPTA | | 23 November 2023 | | |
| Japan | Indonesia–Japan Economic Partnership Agreement | IJEPA | 20 August 2007 | 20 August 2007 | 1 July 2008 | |
| Mozambique | Indonesia–Mozambique Preferential Trade Agreement | IMPTA | April 2018 | 28 August 2019 | June 2022 | |
| Pakistan | Indonesia–Pakistan Preferential Trade Agreement | IPPTA | 24 November 2005 | 3 February 2012 | 13 September 2013 | |
| Palestine | Indonesia–Palestine Trade Facilitation for Certain Products | | | 12 December 2017 | 25 April 2018 | |
| Peru | Indonesia–Peru Comprehensive Economic Partnership Agreement | IPCEPA | 15 August 2023 | 11 August 2025 | | |
| South Korea | Indonesia–Korea Comprehensive Economic Partnership Agreement | IKCEPA | 12 July 2012 | 18 December 2020 | 1 January 2023 | |
| United Arab Emirates | Indonesia–UAE Comprehensive Economic Partnership Agreement | IUAECEPA | | 1 July 2022 | 1 September 2023 | |
| ASEAN | ASEAN Free Trade Area | AFTA | | 28 January 1992 | 1 January 1993 | |
| Australia; New Zealand | ASEAN–Australia–New Zealand Free Trade Area | AANZFTA | 21 February 2005 | 27 February 2009 | 1 January 2010 | |
| China | ASEAN–China Free Trade Area | ACFTA | 4 November 2000 | 29 November 2004 | 1 July 2005 | |
| Hong Kong | ASEAN–Hong Kong, China Free Trade Area | AHKFTA | 11 July 2014 | 12 November 2017 | 13 October 2019 | |
| India | ASEAN–India Free Trade Area | AIFTA | 7 March 2004 | 13 August 2009 | 1 January 2010 | |
| Japan | ASEAN–Japan Comprehensive Economic Partnership | AJCEP | 14 April 2005 | 14 April 2008 | 1 February 2009 | |
| South Korea | ASEAN–Korea Free Trade Area | AKFTA | 30 November 2004 | 24 August 2006 | 1 January 2010 | |
| Indonesia; Bangladesh; Egypt; Iran; Malaysia; Nigeria; Pakistan; Turkey | Preferential Tariff Arrangement-Group of Eight Developing Countries | PTA-D8 | | 13 May 2006 | 25 August 2011 | |
| ASEAN; China; Japan; South Korea; Australia; New Zealand | Regional Comprehensive Economic Partnership | RCEP | 20 November 2012 | 3 November 2022 | 3 November 2022 | |
| OIC | Trade Prefential System-Organisation of Islamic Conference | TPS-OIC | April 2004 | 1 January 2014 | 1 July 2022 | |

=== Trade agreements under negotiation ===
- Indonesia–United States Free Trade Agreement (Indonesia-United States FTA)
- Indonesia–Bangladesh Preferential Trade Agreement (Indonesia-Bangladesh PTA)
- Indonesia–Egypt Preferential Trade Agreement (Indonesia-Egypt PTA); Negotiations launched: 10 October 2026
- Indonesia–GCC Free Trade Agreement (Indonesia-GCC FTA); Negotiations launched: 1 January 2024
- Indonesia–Mauritius Preferential Trade Agreement (Indonesia-Mauritius PTA)
- Indonesia–Mercosur Comprehensive Economic Partnership Agreement (Indonesia-Mercosur CEPA)
- Indonesia–Pakistan Free Trade Agreement (Indonesia-Pakistan FTA); Negotiations launched: January 2019
- Indonesia–Sri Lanka Preferential Trade Agreement (Indonesia-Sri Lanka PTA); Negotiations launched: 1 January 2024
- Indonesia–Turkey Preferential Trade Agreement (Indonesia-Turkey PTA); Negotiations launched: 6 July 2017
- Indonesia–Tunisia Preferential Trade Agreement (Indonesia-Tunisia PTA); Negotiations launched: 25 June 2018

== Macro-economic trend ==
This is a chart of trend of Indonesia's GDP at market prices by the IMF with figures in millions of rupiah.

| Year | GDP | USD exchange (rupiah) | Inflation rate (%) | Nominal GDP per capita (as % of US) | GDP PPP per capita (as % of US) |
|---|---|---|---|---|---|
| 1980 | 60,143.191 | 627 | 18.0 | 3.90 | 5.93 |
| 1985 | 112,969.792 | 1,111 | 4.7 | 2.82 | 5.98 |
| 1990 | 233,013.290 | 1,843 | 7.8 | 2.45 | 12.90 |
| 1995 | 502,249.558 | 2,249 | 9.4 | 3.57 | 15.76 |
| 2000 | 1,389,769,700 | 8,396 | 3.8 | 2.15 | 13.05 |
| 2005 | 2,678,664,096 | 9,705 | 10.5 | 2.86 | 14.17 |
| 2010 | 6,422,918,230 | 8,555 | 5.1 | 6.44 | 17.54 |
| 2015 | 11,531,700,000 | 13,824 | 6.4 | 5.86 | 18.02 |
| 2020 | 15,434,200,000 | 14,105 | 1.7 | 6.35 | 18.89 |
| 2025 | 23,821,104,000 | 16,475 | 3.0 | 5.62 | 19.61 |

For purchasing power parity comparisons, the exchange rate for 1 US dollar is set at 4,734 rupiah.

Average net wage in Indonesia varies by sector. In February 2017 the electricity, gas, and water sector has the highest average net wage, while the agriculture sector has the lowest.

== Investment ==
Indonesia Stock Exchange building in Jakarta.

Since the late 1980s, Indonesia has made significant changes to its regulatory framework to encourage economic growth. This growth was financed mostly from private investment, both foreign and domestic. US investors dominated the oil and gas sector and undertook some of Indonesia's largest mining projects. In addition, the presence of US banks, manufacturers, and service providers expanded, especially after the industrial and financial sector reforms of the 1980s. Other major foreign investors included India, Japan, the UK, Singapore, the Netherlands, Qatar, Hong Kong, Taiwan and South Korea.

The 1997 crisis made continued private financing imperative but problematic. New foreign investment approvals fell by almost two-thirds between 1997 and 1999. The crisis further highlighted areas where additional reform was needed. Frequently cited areas for improving the investment climate were the establishment of a functioning legal and judicial system, adherence to competitive processes, and adoption of internationally acceptable accounting and disclosure standards. Despite improvements of laws in recent years, Indonesia's intellectual property rights regime remains weak, and lack of effective enforcement is a significant concern. Under Suharto, Indonesia had moved towards the private provision of public infrastructure, including electric power, toll roads, and telecommunications. The 1997 crisis brought to light a severe weakness in the process of dispute resolution, however, particularly in the area of private infrastructure projects. Although Indonesia continued to have the advantages of a large labour force, abundant natural resources and modern infrastructure, private investment in new projects largely ceased during the crisis.

As of 28 June 2010, the Indonesia Stock Exchange had 341 listed companies with a combined market capitalisation of $269.9 billion. As of November 2010, two-thirds of the market capitalisation was in the form of foreign funds, and only around 1% of the population have stock investments. Efforts are further being made to improve the business and investment environment. Within the World Bank's Doing Business Survey, Indonesia rose to 122 out of 178 countries in 2010, from 129 in the previous year. Despite these efforts, the rank is still below regional peers, and an unfavorable investment climate persists. For example, potential foreign investors and their executive staff cannot maintain their own bank accounts in Indonesia, unless they are tax-paying local residents (paying tax in Indonesia for their worldwide income).

From 1990 to 2010, Indonesian companies have been involved in 3,757 mergers and acquisitions as either acquirer or target with a total known value of $137 billion. In 2010, 609 transactions were announced, which is a new record. Numbers had increased by 19% compared to 2009. The value of deals in 2010 was US$17 billion, which is the second-highest number ever. In 2012, Indonesia realised total investments of $32.5 billion, surpassing its annual target $25 billion, as reported by Investment Coordinating Board (BKPM) on 22 January. The primary investments were in the mining, transport and chemicals sectors. In 2011, the Indonesian government announced a new Masterplan (known as the MP3EI, or Masterplan Percepatan dan Perluasan Pembangunan Ekonomi Indonesia, the Masterplan to Accelerate and Expand Economic Development in Indonesia). The aim was to encourage increased investment, particularly in infrastructure projects across Indonesia.

Indonesia regained its investment grade rating from Fitch Rating in late 2011, and from Moody's Rating in early 2012, after losing it in the 1997 crisis, during which Indonesia spent more than Rp. 450 trillion ($50 billion) to bail out lenders from banks. Fitch raised Indonesia's long-term and local currency debt rating to BBB− from BB+ with both ratings is stable. Fitch also predicted that the economy would grow at least 6% on average per year through 2013, despite a less conducive global economic climate. Moody's raised Indonesia's foreign and local currency bond ratings to Baa3 from Ba1 with a stable outlook. In May 2017, S&P Global raised Indonesia's investment grade from BB+ to BBB− with a stable outlook, due to the economy experiencing a rebound in exports and strong consumer spending during early 2017.

=== Foreign Direct Investment (FDI) ===
Indonesia's foreign direct investment surged 44.2% on a yearly basis in 2022, with the base metals sector drawing in the biggest inflows. Indonesia's received 654.4 trillion rupiah worth of FDI last year, or equivalent to $45.6 billion in the investment ministry's official calculation, which assumes an exchange rate of 14,350 to the dollar. The data excludes investment in the banking and oil and gas sectors. Foreign direct investment in base metals and mining reached $11 billion and $5.1 billion, respectively, last year, the biggest recipients of FDI. The biggest sources were Singapore, China and Hong Kong. Total investment, including from domestic sources, reached 1,207.2 trillion rupiah ($81.02 billion), roughly in line with the government's target. FDI in the final quarter of last year was up 43.3% on an annual basis, amounting to 175.2 trillion rupiah in rupiah terms, or $12.2 billion in the official US dollar equivalent.

List of the 10 largest foreign investment origin countries in Indonesia :

| Rank | Country | FDI 2022 in billion USD | FDI 2024 in billion USD | increase |
|---|---|---|---|---|
| 1 | Singapore | $10.54 | $20.04 | ▲90.13% |
| 2 | Hong Kong | $3.91 | $8.22 | ▲110.23% |
| 3 | China | $5.18 | $8.11 | ▲56.56% |
| 4 | Malaysia | $2.21 | $4.24 | ▲91.86% |
| 5 | United States | $2.12 | $3.70 | ▲74.53% |
| 6 | Japan | $2.76 | $3.46 | ▲25.36% |
| 7 | South Korea | $1.66 | $2.99 | ▲80.12% |
| 8 | Netherlands | $1.09 | $1.98 | ▲81.65% |
| 9 | British Virgin Islands | (Note: Bermuda invest US$ 0.76 billion in 2022) | $0.78 | New entry |
| 10 | United Kingdom | $0.51 | $0.75 | ▲47.06% |
| Total | | $45.6 | $60.0 | ▲31.60% |

Foreign direct investment into Indonesia (excluding investment in banking and the oil and gas sectors) increased 20.2 per cent year-on-year to a new record peak of IDR 177 trillion (US$11.96 billion) in the Q1 of 2023, amid efforts by the government to ease business and licensing rules. Singapore (US$4.3 billion) was the biggest source of investment, followed by Hong Kong (US$1.5 billion), China (US$1.2 billion), and Japan (US$1 billion) while base metals were the biggest recipient amid efforts to boost investment in processed minerals. In total, Indonesia recorded IDR 328.9 trillion of foreign and domestic investment during the first quarter, up 16.5 per cent from a year earlier, boosted by a rise in investment in base metals, transportation, and the mining sector. For 2023, the government has set a target to draw IDR 1,400 trillion (US$95.5 billion) of investment from domestic and foreign sources.

== Largest Indonesian companies ==
=== Fortune Global 500 ===
Indonesia has 2 company that rank in the Fortune Global 500 ranking for 2025.

| World Rank | Company | Industry | Sales ($M) | Profits ($M) | Assets ($M) | Employees |
|---|---|---|---|---|---|---|
| 171 | Pertamina | Oil and gas | 75,327 | 3,126 | 89,850 | 43,998 |
| 469 | Perusahaan Listrik Negara | Utilities | 34,437 | 1,118 | 110,154 | 51,435 |

=== Forbes Global 2000 ===
Indonesia has 12 companies that rank in the Forbes Global 2000 ranking for 2025.

| World Rank | Company | Industry | Sales (billion $) | Profits (billion $) | Assets (billion $) | Market Value (billion $) |
|---|---|---|---|---|---|---|
| 349 | Bank Rakyat Indonesia | Banking | 16.07 | 3.80 | 123.83 | 33.48 |
| 408 | Bank Mandiri | Banking | 12.34 | 3.52 | 150.82 | 26.90 |
| 482 | Bank Central Asia | Banking | 7.64 | 3.50 | 92.62 | 62.99 |
| 1,003 | Telkom Indonesia | Telecommunications | 9.46 | 1.49 | 18.62 | 15.30 |
| 1,064 | Bank Negara Indonesia | Banking | 5.55 | 1.35 | 70.20 | 9.31 |
| 1,220 | Bayan Resources | Materials | 3.44 | 0.92 | 11.12 | 39.51 |
| 1,436 | Amman Mineral | Materials | 2.67 | 0.64 | 9.86 | 29.62 |
| 1,685 | Chandra Asri | Chemical manufacturing | 1.78 | -0.07 | 5.66 | 40.09 |
| 1,912 | Adaro Energy | Energy | 2.08 | 1.38 | 10.91 | 3.38 |
| 1,923 | DCI Indonesia | Business Services/Data Center | 0.14 | 0.07 | 0.32 | 23.65 |
| 1,986 | Adaro Andalan | Materials | 5.32 | 1.21 | 5.99 | 3.17 |
| 1,998 | Lippo Karawaci | Construction | 0.76 | 1.18 | 3.34 | 0.37 |

== Public expenditure ==
In 2015, total public spending was Rp 1,806 trillion (US$130.88 billion, 15.7% of GDP). Government revenues, including those from state-owned enterprises (BUMN), totalled Rp 1,508 trillion (US$109.28 billion, 13.1% of GDP) resulting in a deficit of 2.6%. Since the 1997 crisis that caused an increase in debt and public subsidies and a decrease in development spending, Indonesia's public finances have undergone a major transformation. As a result of a series macroeconomic policies, including a low budget deficit, Indonesia is considered to have moved into a situation of financial resources sufficiency to address development needs. Decentralisation, enacted during the Habibie administration, has changed the manner of government spending, which has resulted in around 40% of public funds being transferred to regional governments by 2006.

In 2005, rising international oil prices led to the government's decision of slashing fuel subsidies. It led to an extra US$10 billion for government spending on development, and by 2006, there were an additional 5 billion due to steady growth, and declining debt service payments. It was the country's first "fiscal space" since the revenue windfall during the 1970s oil boom. Due to decentralisation and fiscal space, Indonesia has the potential to improve the quality of its public services. Such potential also enables the country to focus on further reforms, such as the provision of targeted infrastructure. Careful management of allocated funds has been described as Indonesia's main issue in public expenditure.

In 2018, President Joko Widodo substantially increased the amount of debt by taking foreign loans. Indonesia has increased the debt by Rp 1,815 trillion compared to his predecessor, SBY. He has insisted that the loan is used for productive long-term projects such as building roads, bridges, and airports. Finance Minister Sri Mulyani also stated that despite an increase of foreign loans and debt, the government has also increased the budget for infrastructure development, healthcare, education, and budget given to regencies and villages. The government is insisting that foreign debt is still under control, and complying with relevant laws that limit debt to be under 60% of GDP.

== Regional performance ==
Based on the regional administration implementation performance evaluation of 2009, by order, the best performance were:

- 3 provinces: North Sulawesi, South Sulawesi, and Central Java;
- 10 regencies: Jombang, Bojonegoro and Pacitan in East Java Province, Sragen in Central Java, Boalemo in Gorontalo, Enrekang in South Sulawesi, Buleleng in Bali, Luwu Utara in South Sulawesi, Karanganyar in Central Java, and Kulon Progo in Yogyakarta;
- 10 cities: Surakarta and Semarang in Central Java, Banjar in West Java, Yogyakarta city in Yogyakarta, Cimahi in West Java, Sawahlunto in West Sumatra, Probolinggo and Mojokerto in East Java, and Sukabumi and Bogor in West Java.

Based on JBIC Fiscal Year 2010 survey (22nd Annual Survey Report) found that in 2009, Indonesia has the highest satisfaction level in net sales and profits for Japanese companies.

== Wealth ==
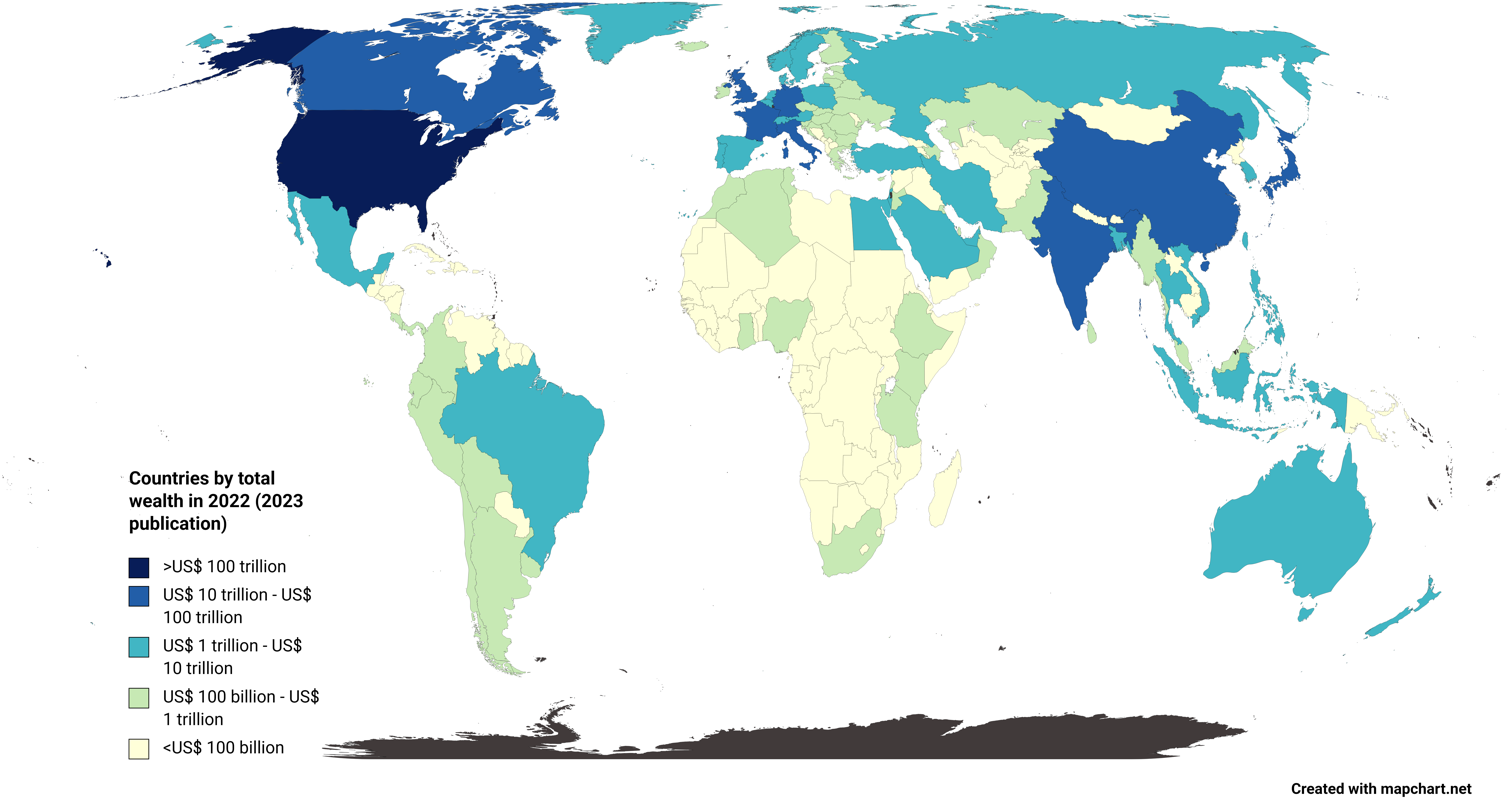
Countries by total wealth (trillions of USD) (2020)

=== National net wealth ===
National net wealth, also known as national net worth, is the total sum of the value of a nation's assets minus its liabilities. It refers to the total value of net wealth possessed by the citizens of a nation at a set point in time. This figure is an important indicator of a nation's ability to take on debt and sustain spending and is influenced not only by real estate prices, equity market prices, exchange rates, liabilities and incidence in a country of the adult population but also by human resources, natural resources and capital and technological advancements, which may create new assets or render others worthless in the future. According to Credit Suisse, Indonesia has national net wealth of approximately $3.199 trillion, or about 0.765% of world net wealth, placing Indonesia at 17th, above Russia, Brazil, and Sweden.

=== High-net-worth individuals ===
According to Asia Wealth Report, Indonesia has the highest growth rate of high-net-worth individuals (HNWI) predicted among the 10 largest Asian economies. The 2015 Knight Frank Wealth Report reported that in 2014 there were 24 individuals with a net worth above US$1 billion. 18 of them lived in Jakarta while the others were spread among other large cities in Indonesia. 192 persons can be categorised as centimillionaires with over US$100 million of wealth and 650 persons as high-net-worth individuals whose wealth exceeded US$30 million.

== Challenges ==
=== Embezzlement and corrupt bureaucracy ===
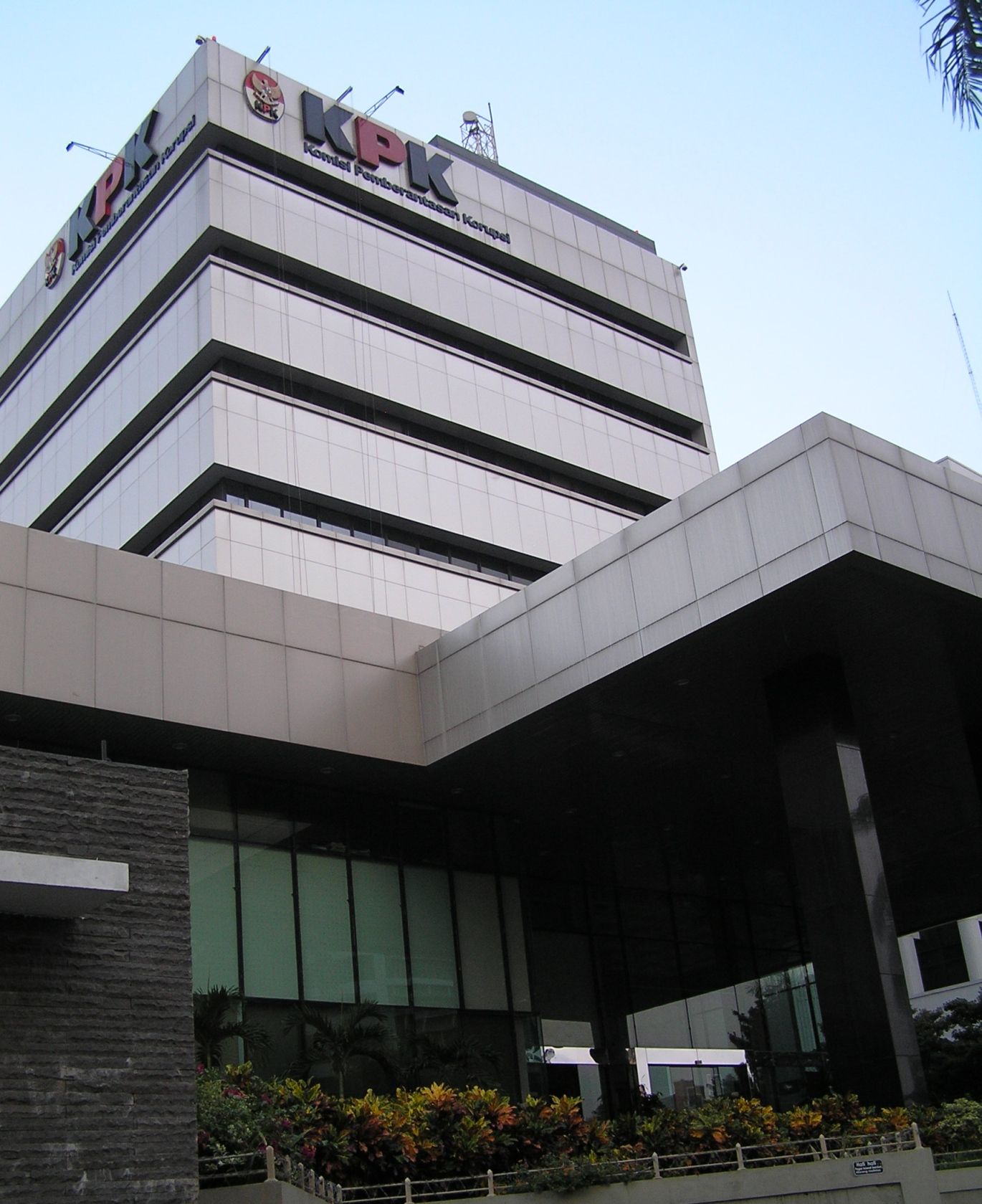
As the result of a revised law in 2019, the anti-graft agency (KPK) has been viewed more negatively by the public.

Corruption is pervasive in the Indonesian government, affecting many fields that are central to barrier the country's economic development from local governments, the police, the private sector even various ministerial institutions which are close to the president. It is related to problems of human capacities and technical resources remains a major challenge in merging effectiveness and integrity in public administration, especially in regencies and cities. A 2018 World Economic Forum survey reports that corruption is the most problematic issue regarding doing business in Indonesia, as well as inefficient government bureaucracy policies. The survey also showed that 70% of entrepreneurs believe that corruption has grown in Indonesia, while low trust in the private sector is a major obstacle to foreign investment in the country.

In 2019, a controversial bill regarding the anti-corruption body (Corruption Eradication Commission (KPK)) reduced the commission's effectiveness in tackling widespread corruption problems and stripped its independence was passed despite massive protests across the country. There were 26 points in the revised law that crippled the commission and might further undermine efforts to eradicate corruption in Indonesia.

=== Labour unrest ===
As of 2011, labour militancy was growing with a major strike at the Grasberg mine, the world's largest gold mine as well as the second-largest copper mine, and numerous strikes elsewhere. A common issue was the attempts by foreign-owned enterprises to evade Indonesia's strict labour laws by calling their employees' contract workers. The New York Times expressed concern that Indonesia's cheap labour advantage might be lost. However, a large pool of the unemployed who will accept substandard wages and conditions remains available. One factor in the increase of militancy is increased awareness via the Internet of prevailing wages in other countries, and the generous profits foreign companies are making in Indonesia.

On 1 September 2015, thousands of workers in Indonesia staged large demonstrations across the country in pursuit of higher wages and improved labour laws. Approximately 35,000 people rallied in total. They demanded a 22% to 25% increase in the minimum wage by 2016 and lower prices on essential goods, including fuel. The unions also want the government to ensure job security and ensure the fundamental rights of the workers.

In 2020, thousands of workers across the country held a massive march to protest against the Omnibus Law on Job Creation that included several controversial rules, which revised minimum wages, lowered severance pay, relaxed firing rules, among other disadvantaging regulations for labours and factory workers.

=== Inequality ===
Economic disparity and the flow of natural resource profits to Jakarta has led to discontent and contributed to separatist movements in areas such as Aceh and Papua. Geographically, the poorest fifth regions account for just 8% of consumption, while the wealthiest fifth account for 45%. While there are new laws on decentralisation that may address the problem of uneven growth and satisfaction partially, there are many hindrances in putting this new policy into practice. At a 2011 Makassar Indonesian Chamber of Commerce and Industry (Kadin) meeting, Disadvantaged Regions Minister said there are 184 regencies classified as disadvantaged areas, with around 120 in eastern Indonesia. 1% of Indonesia's population has 49.3% of the country's $1.8 trillion wealth, down from 53.5%. However, it is ranked fourth after Russia (74.5%), India (58.4%) and Thailand (58%).

=== Inflation ===
Inflation has long been a problem in Indonesia. Because of political turmoil, the country once suffered hyperinflation, with 1,000% annual inflation between 1964 and 1967, resulting in severe poverty and hunger. Even though the economy recovered quickly during the first decade of the New Order administration (1970–1981), never once was the inflation less than 10% annually. The inflation slowed during the mid-1980s; however, the economy was also languid due to the decrease in oil price that reduced its export revenue dramatically. The economy was again experiencing rapid growth between 1989 and 1997 due to the improving export-oriented manufacturing sector. Still, the inflation rate was higher than economic growth, and this caused a widening gap among Indonesians. Inflation peaked in 1998 during the 1997 crisis at over 58%, causing poverty to rise to the levels of the 1960s. During the economic recovery and growth in recent years, the government has been trying to lower the inflation rate. However, it seems that inflation has been affected by global fluctuation and domestic market competition. As of 2010, the inflation rate was approximately 7%, when its economic growth was 6%. To date, inflation is affecting the Indonesian lower middle class, especially those who are not able to afford food after price hikes. At the end of 2017, Indonesia's inflation rate was 3.61%, or higher than the government-set forecast of 3.0–3.5%. In more recent years, the Bank of Indonesia has been successful in maintaining core inflation within its target band of 2.0-4.0%.

=== Poverty ===
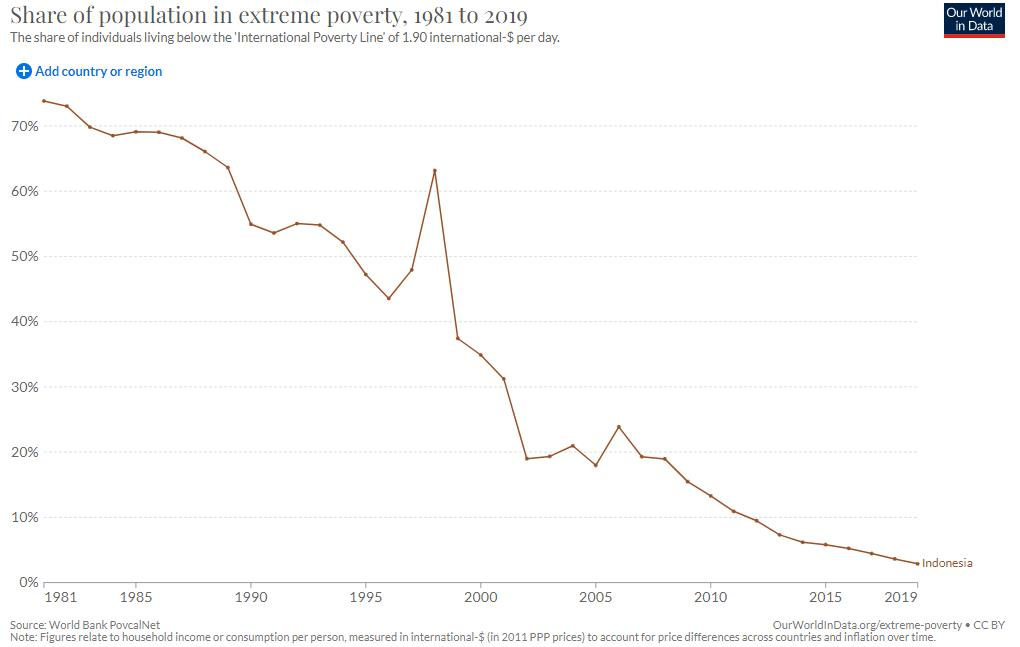
Share of population in extreme poverty

Poverty in Indonesia is a widespread issue though in recent years the official numbers show a declining trend. Due to the dense rural nature of parts of the Java, Bali, Lombok, and parts of Sumatra, poverty can be classified into rural and urban poverty. Urban poverty is prevalent in not only in Jabodetabek, but also in Medan and Surabaya.

As a sprawling archipelago, poverty characteristics and implications vary widely from island to island and culture to culture. The Indonesian part of New Guinea (comprising the provinces of Papua and West Papua) has serious poverty issues of its own due to economic, cultural, linguistic and physical isolations which set it apart from the rest of Indonesia.

=== Productivity ===
Slow pace of productivity growth has become a limiting constraint on economic growth. Indonesia has the lowest rate of productivity growth among Asian peers. This has been particularly acute in the manufacturing sector, where the rate of value added per worker has almost halved since 2004. Moreover, manufacturing has declined as a share of GDP since 2004, shrinking from 24% to 18%. Manufacturing is critical to the growth of developing economies, and it may contribute to Indonesia's slow GDP growth compared to regional peers.

=== Underinvestment ===
Recent analyses highlight persistent underinvestment as a major structural constraint. Indonesia's capital formation, public and private, remains low relative to regional peers, and human-capital development has not kept pace with high demands of high-value added manufacturing. These factors contribute to modest GDP growth relative to peers.

== See also ==
- Alcohol in Indonesia
- Bamboo network
- Brunei Darussalam–Indonesia–Malaysia–Philippines East ASEAN Growth Area
- CIVETS countries
- Climate finance in Indonesia
- Corruption in Indonesia
- Indonesia Stock Exchange
- Developing 8 Countries
- G-20 major economies
- G20 developing nations
- Gas subsidies in Indonesia
- Government Investment Unit of Indonesia
- Indonesia–Malaysia–Thailand Growth Triangle
- Indonesia–Malaysia–Singapore growth triangle
- List of Indonesian cities by GDP
- List of Indonesian regencies by GDP
- List of Indonesian provinces by GDP
- List of Indonesian provinces by GDP per capita
- List of main infrastructure projects in Indonesia
- List of companies of Indonesia
- List of largest companies in Indonesia
- List of Indonesians by net worth
- Next Eleven
- Nine Dragons (Indonesia)
- Pancasila economics
- Tiger Cub Economies
- Timor-Leste–Indonesia–Australia Growth Triangle
