= List of cities in ASEAN by population =

These are the lists of metropolitan areas and cities in the Association of Southeast Asian Nations (ASEAN).

Most populous cities in Southeast Asia (500,000+ inhabitants)

== Largest metropolitan areas ==
The 20 largest metropolitan areas in ASEAN are as follows, with population figures within officially defined metropolitan areas obtained from the respective national censuses. Metropolitan areas in bold are the largest within the respective nations.

Rank	Urban area	Core city	Constituent subdivisions	Population	Country	Image	Census year	Reference
1	**Greater Jakarta**	Jakarta	Jakarta; Bekasi; Bekasi Regency; Bogor; Bogor Regency; Depok; South Tangerang; Tangerang; Tangerang Regency	41,914,000	Indonesia		2025	
2	**Greater Manila Area**	Metro Manila	Metro Manila; Bulacan; Rizal; Laguna; Cavite	30,785,176	Philippines		2024	
3	**Ho Chi Minh City Metropolitan Area**	Ho Chi Minh City	Ho Chi Minh City; Bà Rịa–Vũng Tàu; Bình Dương; Bình Phước; Đồng Nai; Long An; Tây Ninh; Tiền Giang	21,281,639	Vietnam		2019	
4	Hanoi Capital Region	Hanoi	Hanoi; Bắc Giang; Bắc Ninh; Hà Nam; Hải Dương; Hòa Bình; Hưng Yên; Phú Thọ; Thái Nguyên; Vĩnh Phúc	19,980,000	Vietnam		2019	
5	**Bangkok Metropolitan Region**	Bangkok	Bangkok; Nonthaburi; Nakhon Pathom; Pathum Thani; Samut Prakan; Samut Sakhon	10,696,258	Thailand		2020	
6	Greater Surabaya	Surabaya	Surabaya; Bangkalan Regency; Gresik Regency; Lamongan Regency; Mojokerto; Mojokerto Regency; Sidoarjo Regency	9,924,509	Indonesia		2020	
7	Greater Bandung	Bandung	Bandung; Bandung Regency; Cimahi; Sumedang Regency; West Bandung Regency	8,790,308	Indonesia		2020	
8	**Klang Valley**	Kuala Lumpur	Kuala Lumpur; Ampang Jaya; Kajang; Klang; Kuala Langat; Petaling Jaya; Putrajaya; Selayang; Sepang; Shah Alam; Subang Jaya	8,455,029	Malaysia		2020	
9	**Yangon Region**	Yangon	Yangon Region	7,360,703	Myanmar		2014	
10	Greater Semarang	Semarang	Semarang; Demak Regency; Grobogan Regency; Kendal Regency; Salatiga; Semarang Regency	6,009,982	Indonesia		2020	
11	**Singapore**	Singapore	Singapore	5,685,807	Singapore		2020	
12	Da Nang Metropolitan Area	Da Nang	Da Nang; Quảng Nam; Quảng Ngãi; Quảng Trị; Huế	5,622,814	Vietnam		2019	
13	Greater Medan	Medan	Medan; Binjai; Deli Serdang Regency; Karo Regency	4,756,863	Indonesia		2020	
14	Metro Davao	Davao	Davao; Carmen; Digos; Hagonoy; Maco; Malalag; Malita; Mati; Padada; Panabo; Samal; Santa Cruz; Santa Maria; Sulop; Tagum	3,339,284	Philippines		2020	
15	Metro Cebu	Cebu	Cebu; Carcar; Compostela; Consolacion; Cordova; Danao; Lapu-Lapu; Liloan; Mandaue; Minglanilla; Naga; San Fernando; Talisay	3,165,799	Philippines		2020	
16	George Town Conurbation	George Town	George Town; Bandar Baharu; Kerian; Kulim; Seberang Perai; Selama; Sungai Petani; Yan	2,843,344	Malaysia		2020	
17	Greater Makassar	Makassar	Makassar; Gowa Regency; Maros Regency; Takalar Regency	2,725,951	Indonesia		2020	
18	Greater Palembang	Palembang	Palembang; Banyuasin Regency; Ogan Ilir Regency; Ogan Komering Ilir Regency	2,634,501	Indonesia		2020	
19	**Phnom Penh Metro Area**	Phnom Penh	Phnom Penh; Angk Snuol; Kandal Stueng; Kien Svay; Ponhea Lueu; Ta Khmau	2,506,123	Cambodia		2019	
20	Greater Yogyakarta	Yogyakarta	Yogyakarta; Bantul Regency; Sleman Regency	2,485,163	Indonesia		2020	

== Largest cities proper ==
This list features the most populous cities in ASEAN. Population figures were taken from within the city proper only. See the article on each city for sources. Myanmar data is the least reliable and subject to revision.

Ranking	Name	Image	Country	Population	Year (Census or Estimate)
1	Metro Manila		Philippines	15,230,600	2024C
2	Jakarta		Indonesia	11,634,000	2025C
3	Bangkok		Thailand	11,391,700	2024E
4	Ho Chi Minh City		Vietnam	8,993,082	2019C
5	Hanoi		Vietnam	8,053,663	2019C
6	Singapore		Singapore	5,917,600	2023E
7	Yangon		Myanmar	5,451,439	2014E
8	Surabaya		Indonesia	3,457,409	2015E
9	Cebu		Philippines	3,164,134	2020C
10	Bandung		Indonesia	2,575,478	2014E
11	Bekasi		Indonesia	2,510,951	2014E
12	Phnom Penh		Cambodia	2,281,951	2019C
13	Medan		Indonesia	2,185,789	2014E
14	Haiphong		Vietnam	2,029,000	2019C
15	Tangerang		Indonesia	2,001,925	2014E
16	Depok		Indonesia	1,869,681	2014E
17	Kuala Lumpur		Malaysia	1,808,922	2017C
18	Davao City	Davao City	Philippines	1,632,991	2015E
19	Semarang		Indonesia	1,575,058	2014E
20	Palembang		Indonesia	1,561,959	2014E
21	South Tangerang		Indonesia	1,436,187	2014E
22	Makassar		Indonesia	1,398,804	2014E
23	Cần Thơ		Vietnam	1,237,300	2019C
24	Mandalay		Myanmar	1,225,553	2014E
25	Batam		Indonesia	1,142,646	2014E
26	Da Nang		Vietnam	1,134,310	2019C
27	Huế		Vietnam	1,128,620	2019C
28	Biên Hòa		Vietnam	1,055,414	2019C
29	Pekanbaru		Indonesia	1,030,742	2014E
30	Thủ Đức		Vietnam	1,013,795	2019C

== Countries ==
- List of cities in Brunei
- List of cities in Cambodia
- List of cities in Indonesia
- List of cities in Laos
- List of cities in Malaysia
- List of cities in Myanmar
- List of cities in the Philippines
- List of cities in Thailand
- List of cities in Timor-Leste
- List of cities in Vietnam

== See also ==
- Demographics of Asia
- Lists of cities
- Lists of cities by country
