= Denpasar metropolitan area =

Metropolitan area in Bali, Indonesia

Denpasar metropolitan area Sarbagita
- Metropolitan area
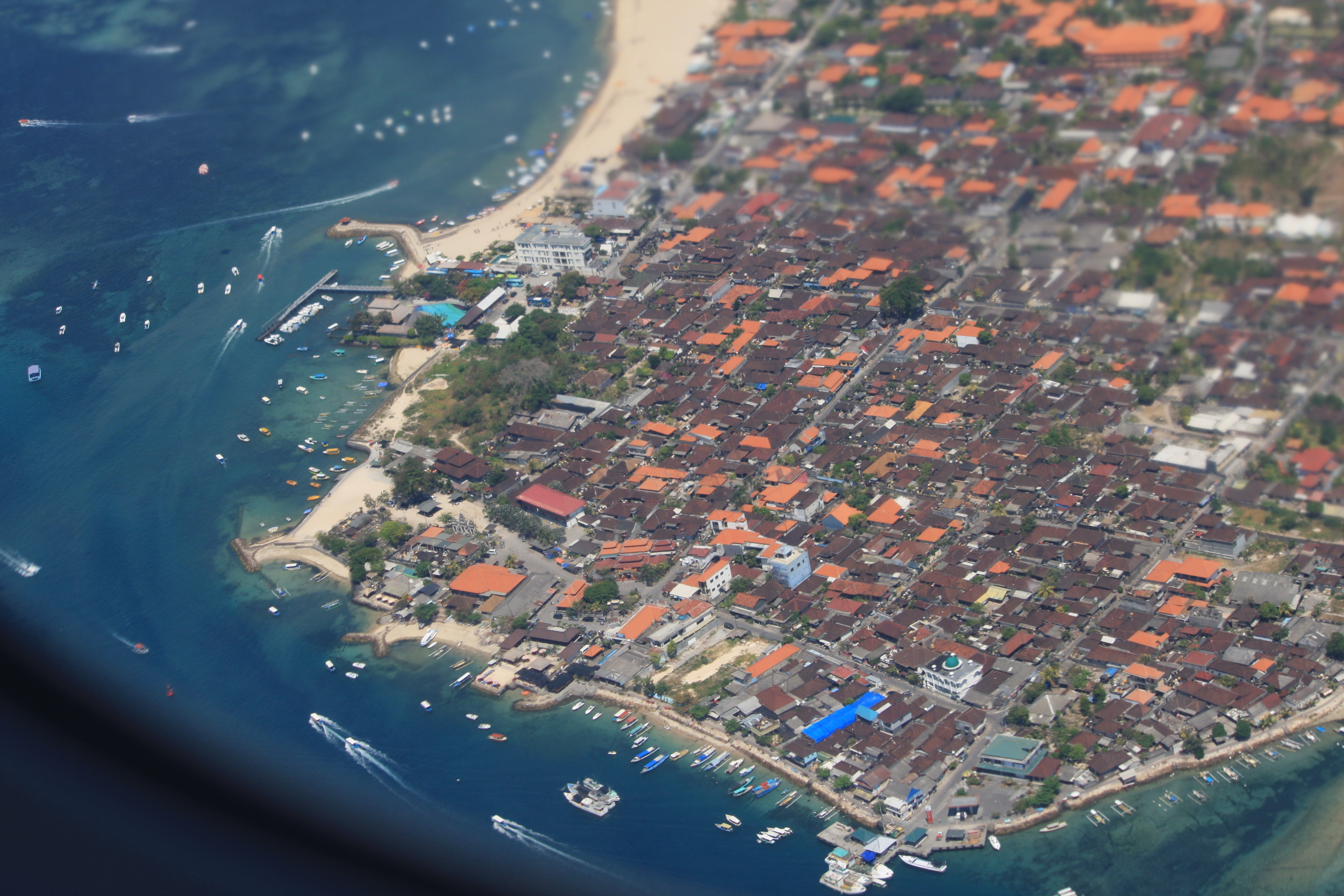
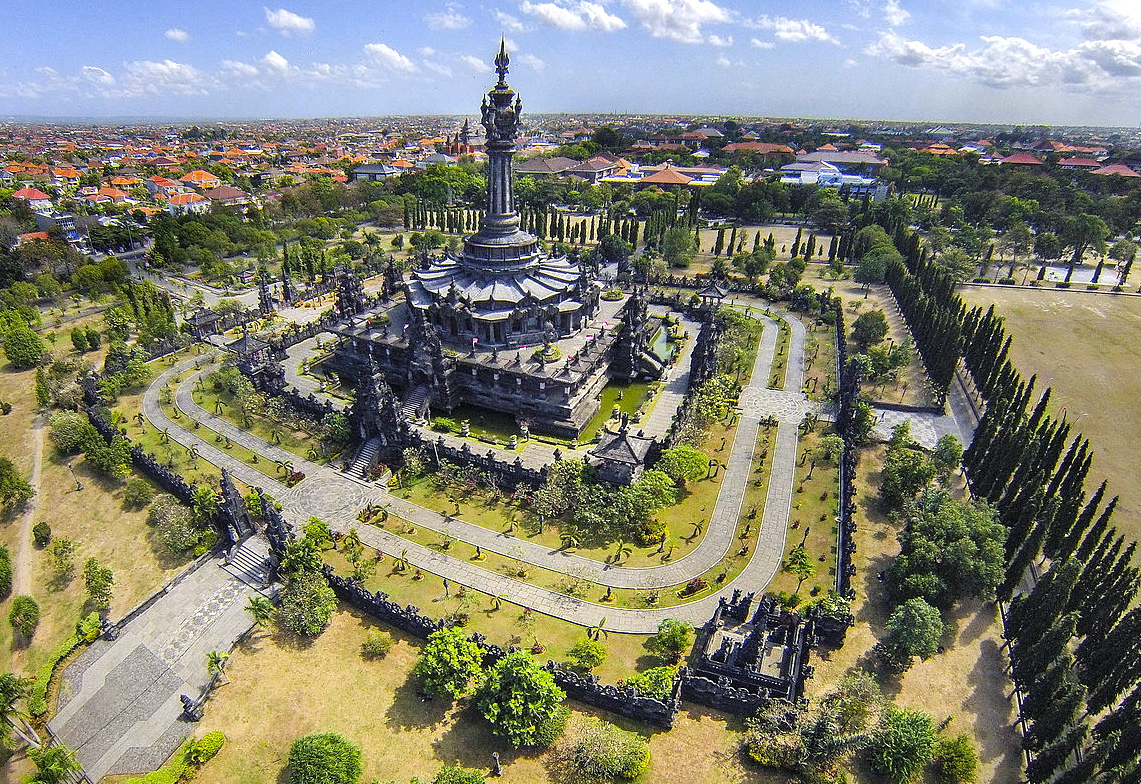
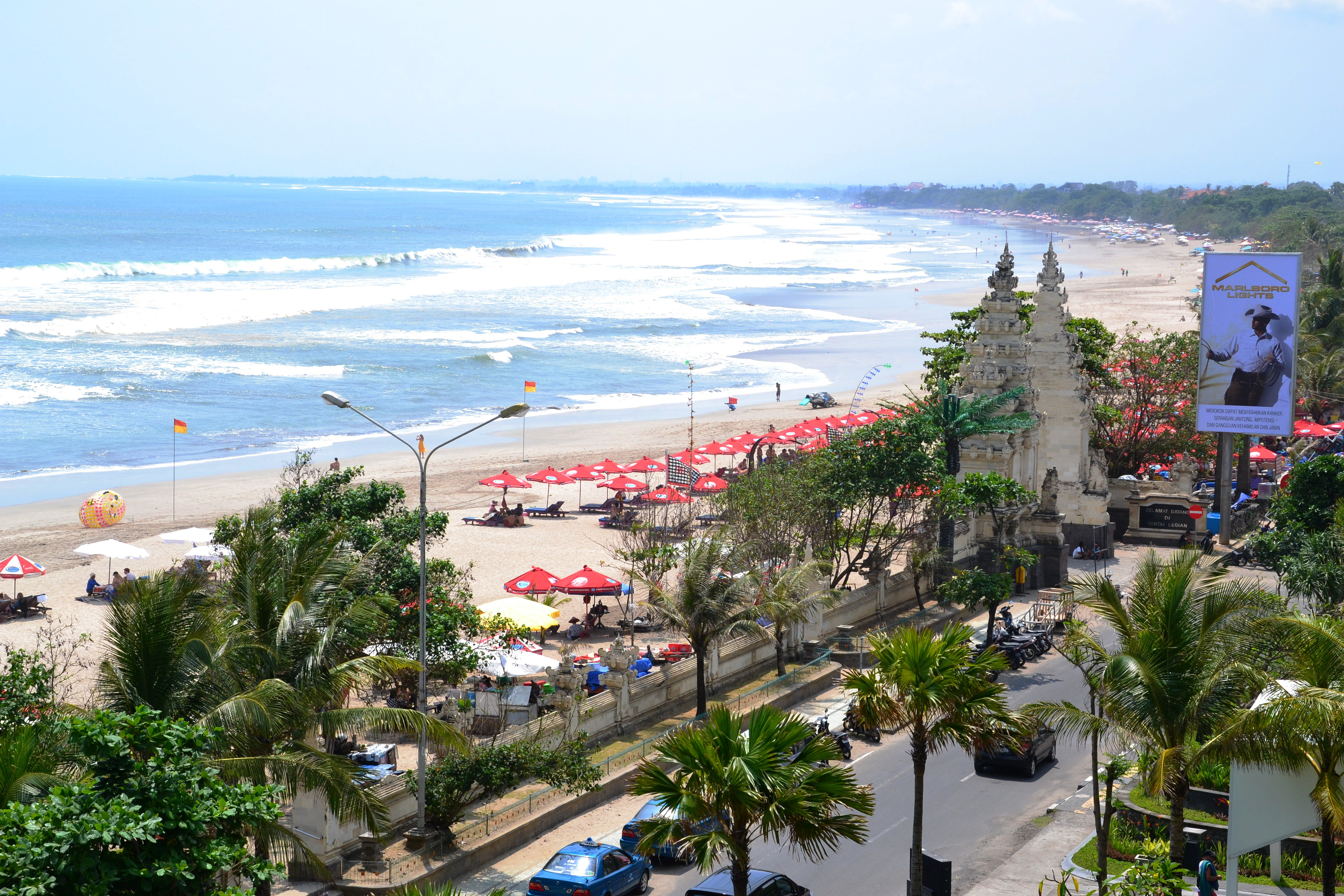
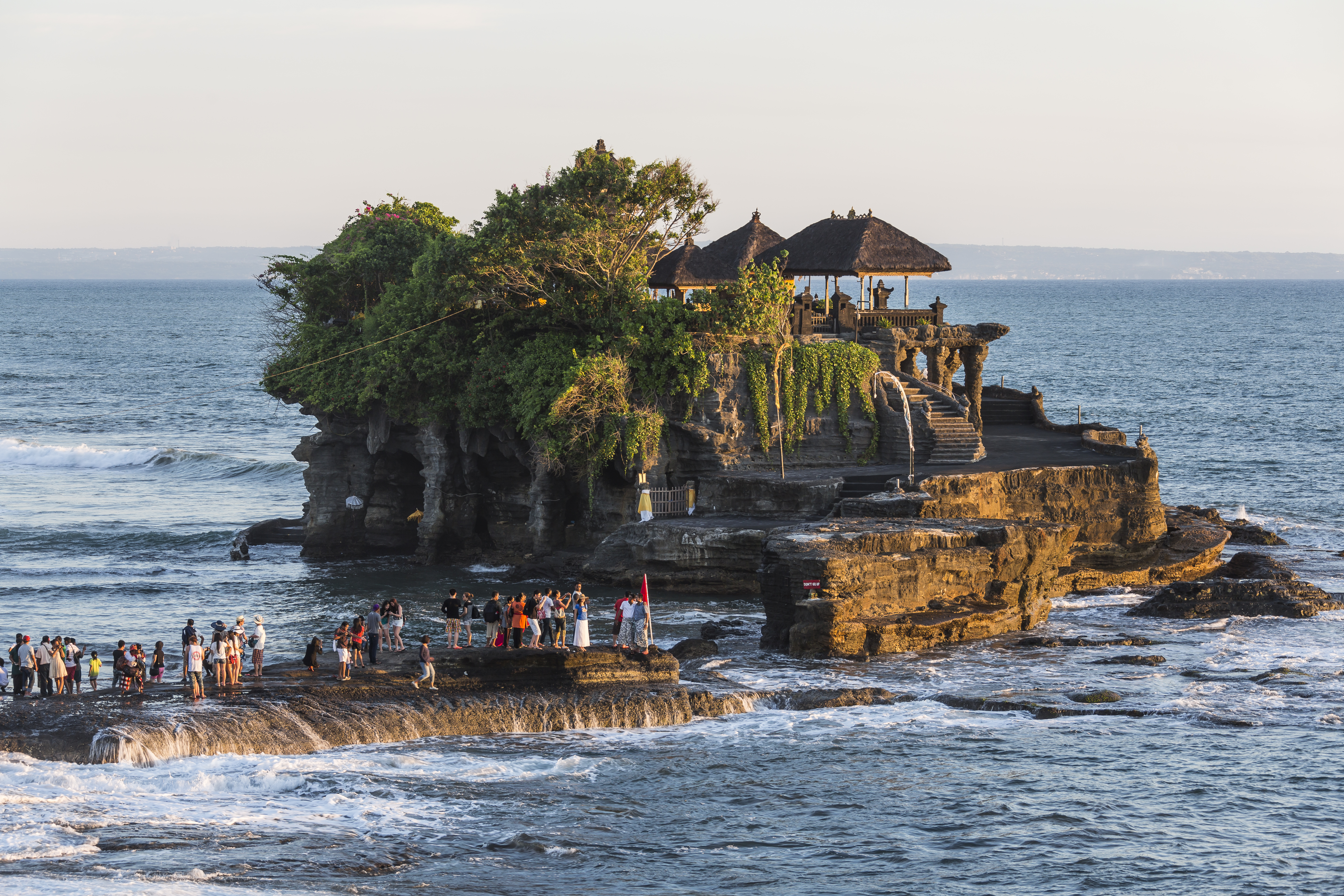
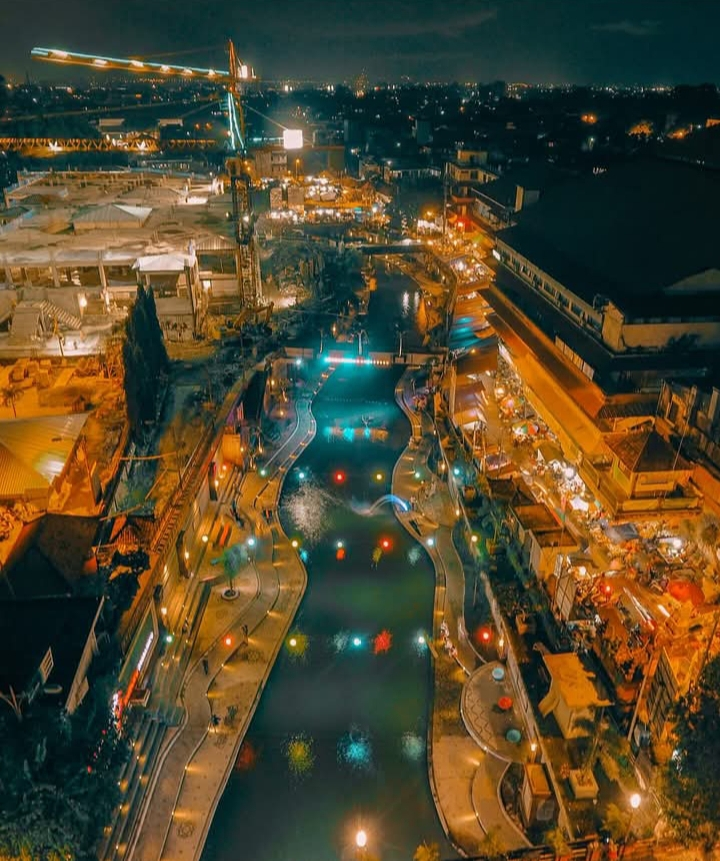
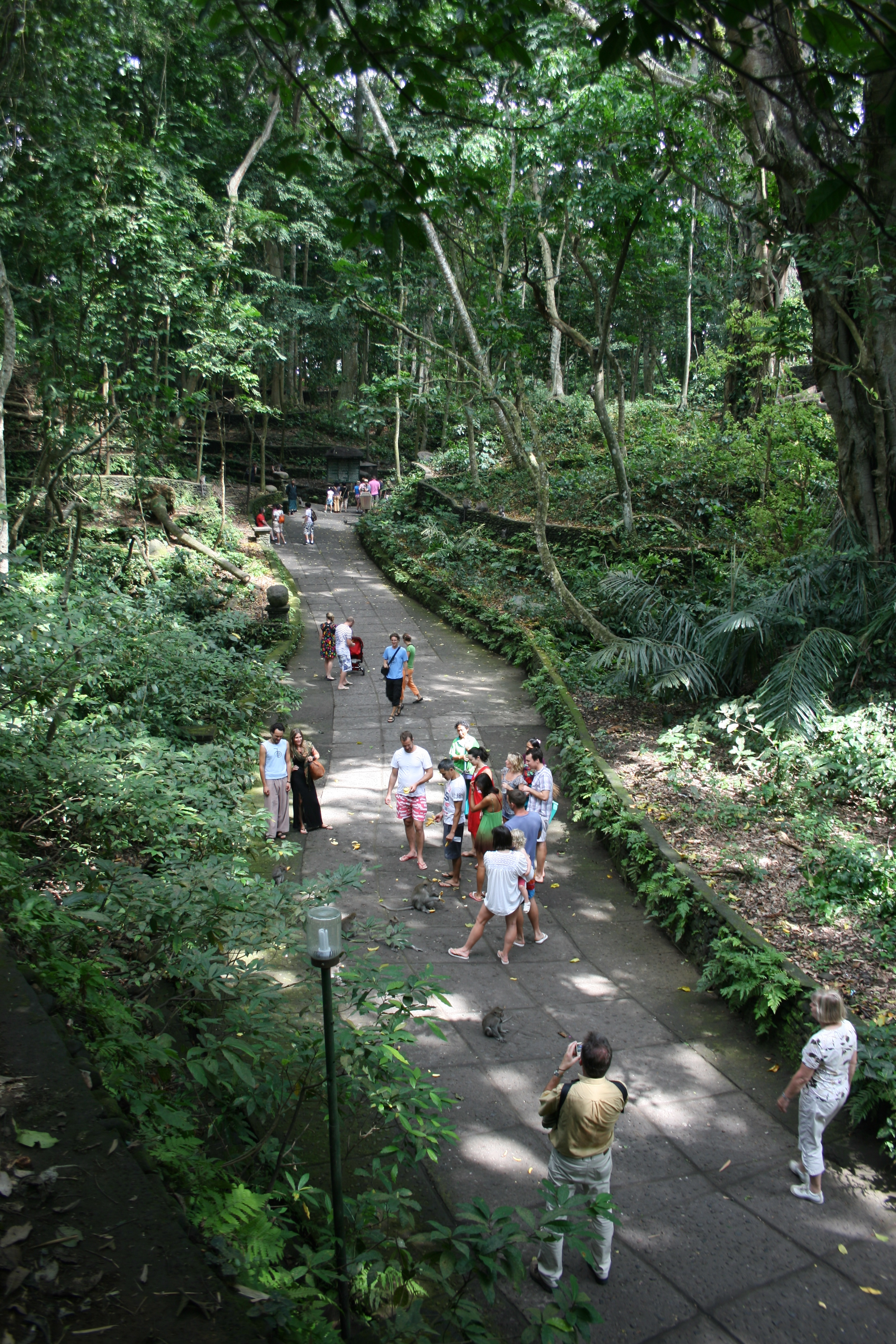
- From top, left to right: Ngurah Rai International Airport in Denpasar City viewed from plane, Bajra Sandhi Monument in Denpasar City, Kuta Beach is a popular tourist spot, Garuda Wisnu Kencana in Badung Regency, Tanah Lot Temple in Tabanan Regency, Kumbasari Park, Denpasar City at Night, Ubud Monkey Forest in Gianyar Regency

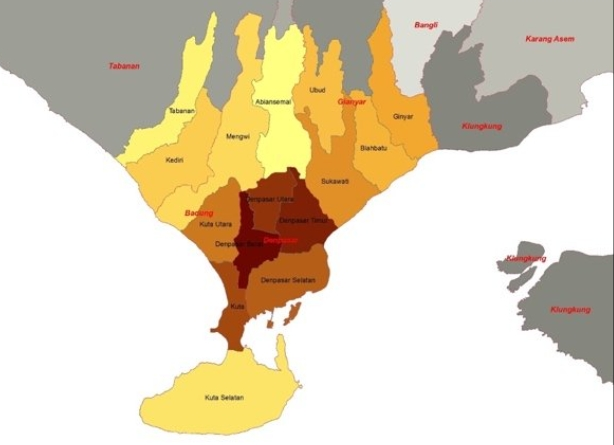
- Coordinates: 8°40′18″S 115°14′02″E
- Country: Indonesia
- Province: Bali
- Core city: Denpasar
- Regencies: Most parts of Badung Regency parts of Gianyar Regency parts of Tabanan Regency

Area
  - Metro: 1,928.28 km^{2} (744.51 sq mi)

Population (mid 2023 estimate)
  - Metro: 2,301,887
  - Metro density: 1,193.75/km^{2} (3,091.80/sq mi)
- Time zone: UTC+8 (Indonesia Central Time)
- GDP metro: 2023
- Total: ▲Rp 184.558 trillion ▲US$ 12.108 billion ▲US$ 38.778 billion (PPP)
- Per capita: ▲Rp 80.176 million ▲US$ 5,260 ▲US$ 16,846 (PPP)

The Denpasar metropolitan area or Greater Denpasar (Note: Indonesian: Wilayah metropolitan Denpasar/Kawasan metropolitan Denpasar, Denpasar Raya; Balinese: Wawengkon métropolitan Dénpasar, Balinese script: ᬯᬯᭂᬂᬓᭀᬦ᭄ᬫᬾᬢ᭄ᬭᭀᬧᭀᬮᬶᬢᬦ᭄ᬤᬾᬦ᭄ᬧᬲᬃ), and locally known as Sarbagita; (an acronym of Denpasar–Badung–Gianyar–Tabanan) is a metropolitan area located in Bali, Indonesia. This area includes Denpasar city and its surrounding areas such as Badung Regency, Gianyar Regency, and Tabanan Regency. Sarbagita is the largest metropolitan area in the Lesser Sunda Islands and the second largest in the Eastern Indonesia region after the Makassar metropolitan area in South Sulawesi. It has an area of 1,928.28 km^{2}, and at the 2023 estimate had a population of 2,301,887.

== Definition ==
The national government regards the Denpasar Metropolitan Area as including Denpasar city, Badung Regency, Gianyar Regency, and Tabanan Regency. This area is on the international trade route such as Lombok Strait and is directly adjacent to Indian Ocean.

== Geography ==
Denpasar is a coastal city with island and bays, islets, and peninsulas, located southern part of Bali Island, eastern part of Indian Ocean. The Lombok Strait separates Bali and Lombok.

== Infrastructure ==
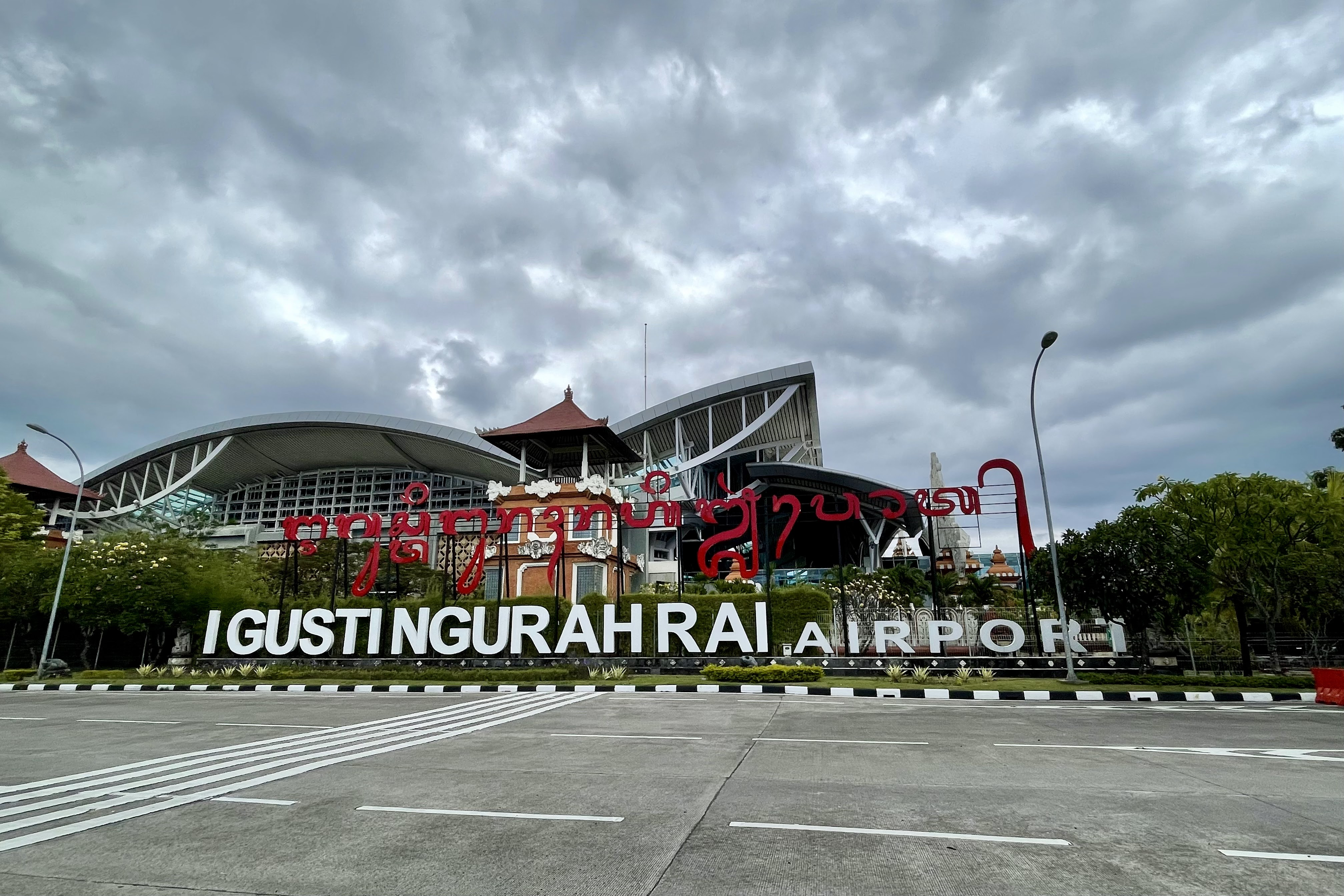
I Gusti Ngurah Rai International Airport

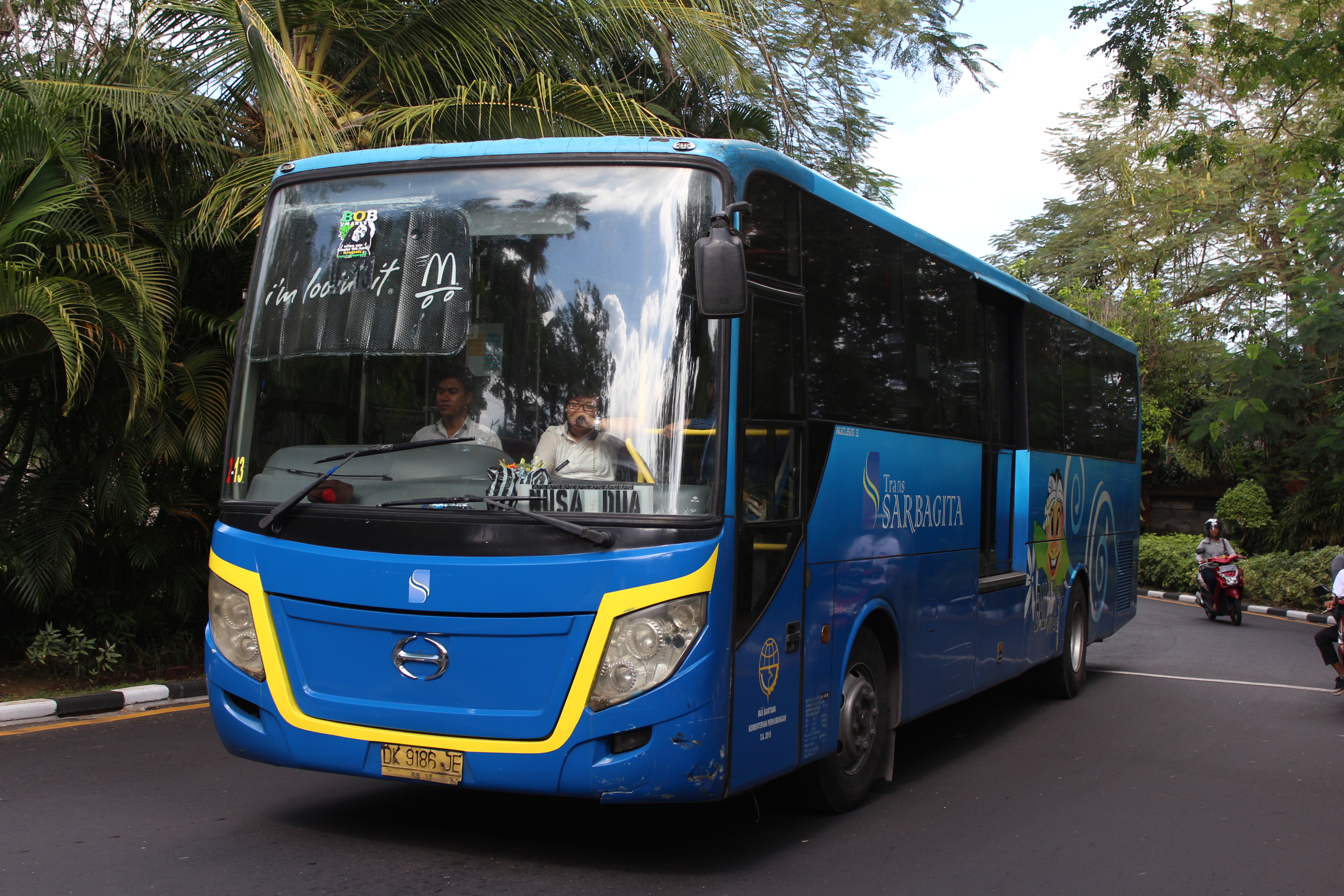
Trans Sarbagita bus

Trans Sarbagita is the cheapest public transportation in Denpasar. It began to operate in February 2011.The price for one ride is Rp2,500 for students and Rp3,500 for the public. Trans Sarbagita operates from 06:00 to 19:00.

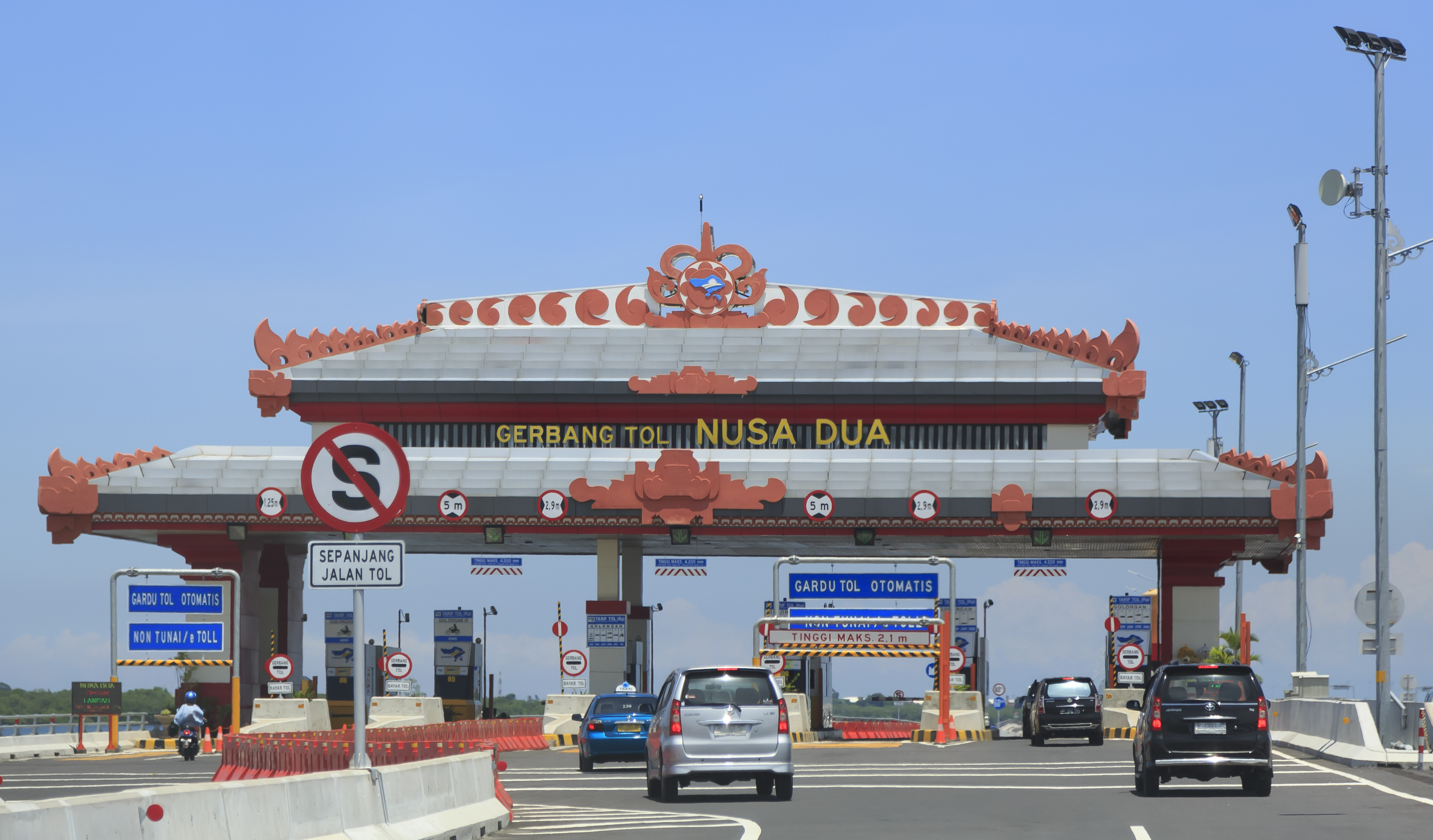
Bali Mandara Toll Road

On 21 December 2011, construction started on the Nusa Dua-Benoa-Ngurah Rai International Airport toll road, will provide a special lane for motorcycles. This has been done by seven state-owned enterprises led by PT Jasa Marga with 60% of the shares. PT Jasa Marga Bali Tol will construct the 9.91-kilometre-long (6.16-mile) toll road (totally 12.7 kilometres (7.89 miles) with access road). The construction is estimated to cost Rp.2.49 trillion ($273.9 million). The project goes through 2 kilometres (1 mile) of mangrove forest and through 2.3 kilometres (1.4 miles) of beach, both within 5.4 hectares (13 acres) area. The elevated toll road is built over the mangrove forest on 18,000 concrete pillars that occupied two hectares of mangrove forest. This was compensated by the planting of 300,000 mangrove trees along the road. On 23 September 2013, the Bali Mandara Toll Road was opened, with the Dewa Ruci Junction (Simpang Siur) underpass being opened previously.

== Tourism ==
Over 5.2 million international tourists visited Bali in 2023. Denpasar is the busiest entry port to Indonesia ahead of Jakarta and Batam. In 2019, around 1.3 million foreign tourists came from Australia, 1.1 million from China and 0.4 million from India. Meanwhile 9.5 million domestic tourists visited Bali in 2023.

== Demographics ==
The metropolitan area is divided into four regencies (kabupaten) and one city (kota). These are, with their areas and their populations at the 2010 census and the 2020 census, together with the official estimates as at mid 2023 and the Human Development Index for each regency and city.

| Name of City or Regency | Capital | Area in km^{2} | Pop'n 2000 Census | Pop'n 2010 Census | Pop'n 2020 Census | Pop'n 2023 Estimate | HDI 2023 estimate | Density (per km^{2}) 2023 |
|---|---|---|---|---|---|---|---|---|
| Denpasar City | Denpasar | 127.78 | 532,440 | 788,589 | 725,314 | 748,397 | 0.847 (Very High) | 5,856.91 |
| Badung Regency | Mangupura | 418.62 | 345,863 | 543,332 | 548,191 | 563,335 | 0.831 (Very High) | 1,345.69 |
| Gianyar Regency | Gianyar | 368.00 | 393,155 | 469,777 | 515,344 | 524,022 | 0.792 (High) | 1,423.97 |
| Tabanan Regency | Tabanan | 1,013.88 | 376,030 | 420,913 | 461,630 | 466,132 | 0.774 (High) | 459.75 |
| Total | | 1,928.28 | 1,647,488 | 2,222,611 | 2,250,479 | 2,301,887 | 0.816 (Very High) | 1,193.75 |

== See also ==
- List of metropolitan areas in Indonesia
- Jakarta metropolitan area
- Surabaya metropolitan area
- Bandung metropolitan area
- Padang metropolitan area
