= List of metropolitan areas in Indonesia =

The government of Indonesia defines a metropolitan area as an urban agglomeration where its spatial planning is prioritised due to its highly important influence on the country. The metropolitan areas in Indonesia are managed based on Presidential Regulation (Peraturan Presiden). The national government has established 10 metropolitan areas across the country, anchored by the cities of Jakarta, Surabaya, Bandung, Semarang, Medan, Makassar, Palembang, Denpasar, Banjarmasin, and Manado. While not having any other official metropolitan areas recognised at the national level, there are several other cities whose urbanised area exceeds their city limits such as Yogyakarta, Malang, Pekanbaru, Surakarta, Pontianak and Cirebon.

== Official metropolitan areas ==

Metropolitan area	Image	Official acronym	Regencies and cities	Area (km^{2})	Estimated population	Ref.
Jakarta metropolitan area		Jabodetabekjur	Special Region of Jakarta (all 44 districts); City of Bekasi (all 12 districts); City of Bogor (all 6 districts); City of Depok (all 11 districts); City of South Tangerang (all 7 districts); City of Tangerang (all 13 districts); Bekasi Regency (all 23 districts); Bogor Regency (all 40 districts); Cianjur Regency (only 4 districts); Tangerang Regency (all 29 districts)	7,062.47	33,430,285	
Surabaya metropolitan area		Gerbangkertosusila	City of Surabaya (all 31 districts); City of Mojokerto (all 2 districts); Bangkalan Regency (all 18 districts); Gresik Regency (only 16 districts, excluding Bawean); Lamongan Regency (all 27 districts); Mojokerto Regency (all 18 districts); Sidoarjo Regency (all 18 districts)	5,925.84	9,570,870	
Bandung metropolitan area		Bandung Basin	City of Bandung (all 30 districts); City of Cimahi (all 3 districts); Bandung Regency (all 31 districts); Sumedang Regency (only 5 districts); West Bandung Regency (all 15 districts)	3,411.35	8,357,393	
Semarang metropolitan area		Kedungsepur	City of Semarang (all 16 districts); City of Salatiga (all 4 districts); Demak Regency (all 14 districts); Grobogan Regency (only 12 districts); Kendal Regency (all 20 districts); Semarang Regency (all 19 districts)	4,298.43	5,689,149	
Medan metropolitan area		Mebidangro	City of Medan (all 21 districts); City of Binjai (all 5 districts); Deli Serdang Regency (all 22 districts); Karo Regency (only 4 districts)	3,189.25	4,848,885	
Makassar metropolitan area		Mamminasata	City of Makassar (all 14 districts); Gowa Regency (only 11 districts); Maros Regency (only 12 districts); Takalar Regency (all 9 districts)	2,667	2,621,168	
Palembang metropolitan area		Patungraya Agung	City of Palembang (all 16 districts); Banyuasin Regency (only 11 districts); Ogan Ilir Regency (only 7 districts); Ogan Komering Ilir Regency (only 4 districts)	7,585.96	2,570,981	
Denpasar metropolitan area		Sarbagita	City of Denpasar (all 4 districts); Badung Regency (only 5 districts); Gianyar Regency (only 4 districts); Tabanan Regency (only 2 districts)	732.67	2,388,680	
Banjarmasin metropolitan area		Banjarbakula	City of Banjarmasin (all 5 districts); City of Banjarbaru (all 5 districts); Banjar Regency (only 14 districts); Barito Kuala Regency (only 12 districts); Tanah Laut Regency (only 10 districts)	8,136.36	1,939,347	
Manado metropolitan area		Bimindo	City of Manado (all 9 districts); City of Bitung (all 8 districts); City of Tomohon (all 5 districts); Minahasa Regency (only 3 districts); North Minahasa Regency (only 6 districts)	1,379.26	830,137	

== Built-up urban areas ==
The followings are the contiguous urban areas in Indonesia, with a population of over 500,000, according to Demographia's "World Urban Areas" study (20th Annual - 2025). Demographia defines an urban area (urbanised area agglomeration or urban centre) as a continuously built up land mass of urban development that is within a labor market (metropolitan area), without regard for administrative boundaries (city).

Rank	World Rank	Urban area	Built-up Area (km^{2})	Estimated population 2025	Notes
1	4	Jakarta	3,546	36,877,000	Jakarta's built-up urban area extends beyond its official metropolitan area, including Karawang.
2	58	Bandung	487	7,490,000	Bandung metropolitan area has more dense urban population than Surabaya metropolitan area.
3	69	Surabaya	912	6,820,000	Surabaya metropolitan area has a larger population than Bandung metropolitan area, but comprises more rural areas than the later.
4	124	Medan	479	4,129,000	Medan is the largest urban area outside of Java island. The urban area is known as Mebidangro.
5	232	Semarang	259	2,390,000	Although Semarang metropolitan area is nominally the fourth most populous in Indonesia, it actually comprises a significant portion of rural areas. Semarang's urban population is much smaller than Medan.
6		Nusantara	3,782	2,188,805	Nusantara is the largest urban area in Kalimantan, the largest urban area outside of Java and Sumatra, and the second largest urban area outside of Java after Medan. The Nusantara metropolitan area includes direct neighbours Balikpapan to the east and Penajam ton the south, as well as the nearby and almost neighbouring Samarinda and its surrounding areas to the north. As the largest metropolitan area by land size, it comprises a significant portion of rural areas.
7	264	Palembang	220	2,102,000	Palembang is the third largest urban area outside of Java island, after Medan and Nusantara. The urban area is known as Patungraya Agung. The Palembang metropolitan area has more dense urban population than Nusantara metropolitan area.
8	274	Makassar	179	2,042,000	Makassar is the largest urban area in Sulawesi. The urban area is known as Mamminasata. Makassar metropolitan area has more dense urban population than Nusantara metropolitan area.
9	330	Malang	212	1,637,000	Although it has no metropolitan area recognised on national level, Malang urban population extends far beyond its administrative area of 145 km^{2}. The urban area is known as Greater Malang.
10	344	Yogyakarta	231	1,569,000	Although it has no metropolitan area recognised on national level, Yogyakarta has the ninth largest urban population in Indonesia, extending far beyond its small city proper area of 32.5 km^{2}. Nevertheless, the urban area, known as Yogyakarta metropolitan area, is managed through Sekretariat Bersama Kartamantul with patronage of the provincial government.
11	360	Batam	243	1,512,000	As an island-city, Batam has not developed a metropolitan area with its surrounding regions, hence its urban population is entirely within its administrative area. A free-trade zone, known as Batam metropolitan area, is established around Batam.
12	391	Denpasar	176	1,392,000	Denpasar is the third largest urban area outside of Java and Sumatra, after Nusantara and Makassar. The urban area is known as Sarbagita.
13		Pontianak	2,517	1,202,232	Pontianak is the second largest urban area in Kalimantan, after Nusantara. Pontianak has no metropolitan area recognised at the national level. The urban area is known as Pontianak metropolitan area which is managed through the provincial government. It comprises a significant portion of rural areas.
14	455	Cirebon	106	1,195,000	Although it has no metropolitan area recognised at the national level, Cirebon's urban population extends beyond its administrative area of 37.4 km^{2}. The urban area is planned by provincial government as Rebana.
15	490	Surakarta	207	1,106,000	Although it has no metropolitan area recognised at the national level, Surakarta's urban population extends far beyond its administrative area of 46 km^{2}. The urban area is known as Greater Solo.
16	473	Pekanbaru	238	1,141,000	Pekanbaru has no metropolitan area recognised at the national level, and its urban population is pretty much concentrated in its city proper, but extends into neighbouring districts of Riau Province. The urban area known as Pekanbaru metropolitan area is managed through the provincial government.
	485	Samarinda	101	1,126,000	Samarinda is included in Nusantara urban areas
	495	Tasikmalaya	62	1,097,000	
	544	Bandar Lampung	106	1,005,000	
	554	Jambi	181	979,000	
	564	Padang	98	953,000	
	638	Serang	114	840,000	
	640	Banjarmasin	65	836,000	
	724	Balikpapan	122	720,000	Balikpapan is included in Nusantara urban areas
	846	Cilegon	122	603,000	

== See also ==
- List of Indonesian cities by population
- List of largest cities
