= Makassar metropolitan area =

Makasssar metropolitan area Mamminasatapa
- Metropolitan area

Regional transcription(s)
  - Makassarese: ᨆᨆᨗᨊᨔᨈᨄ
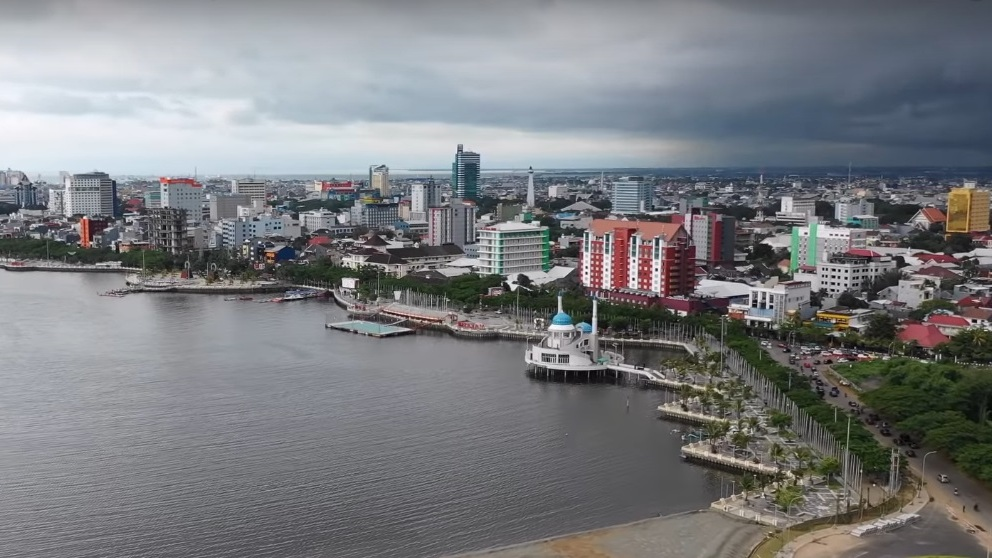
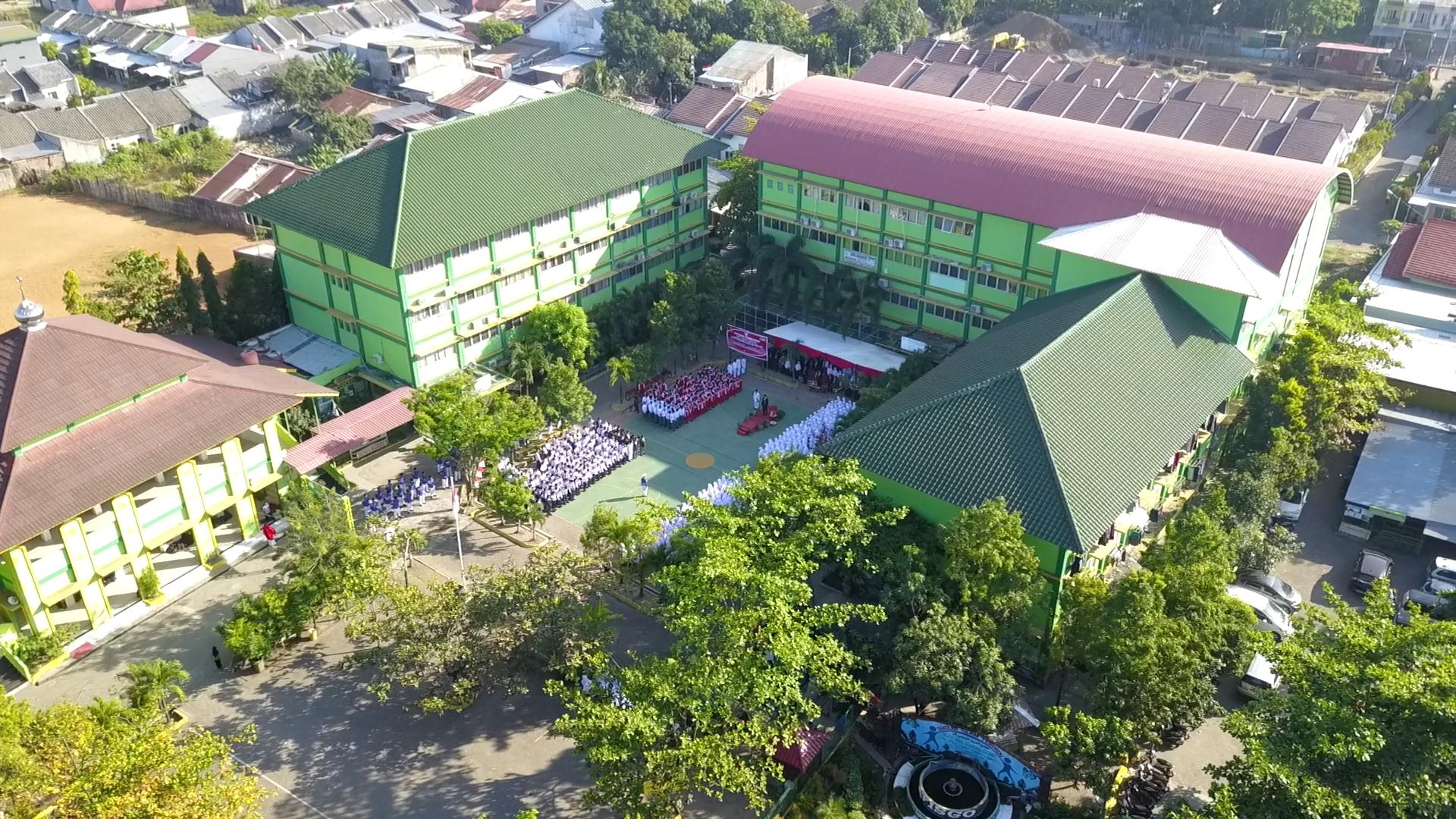
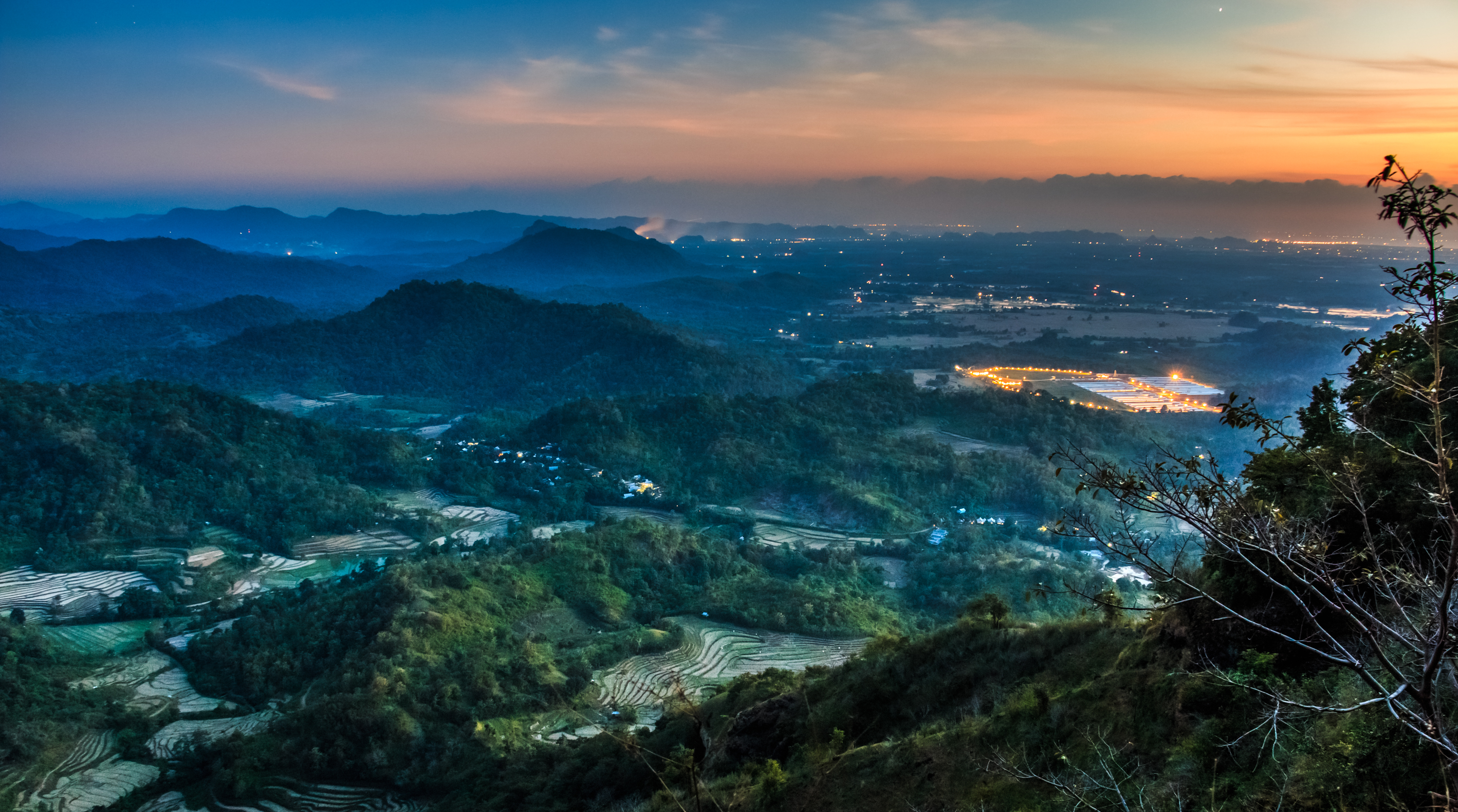
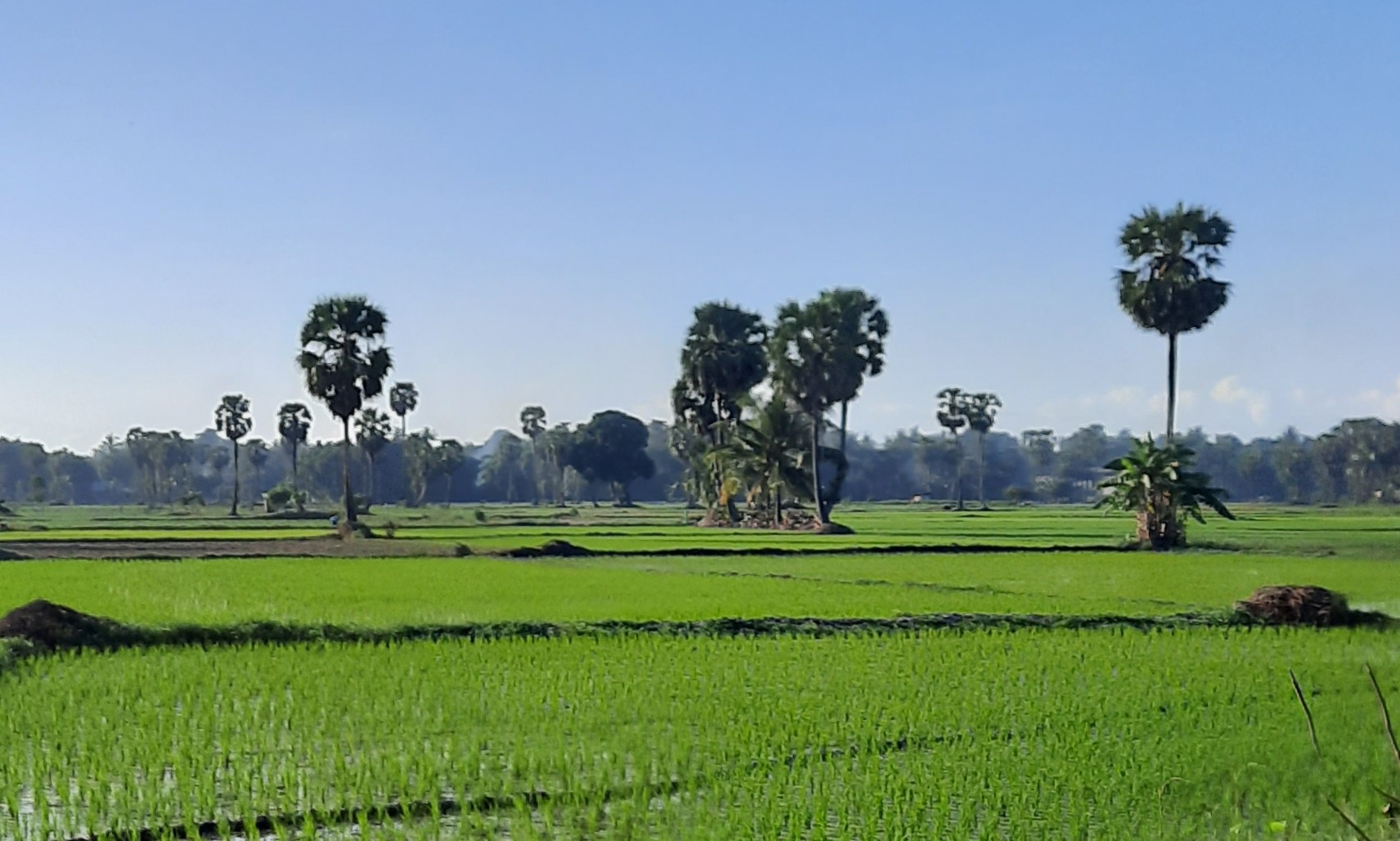
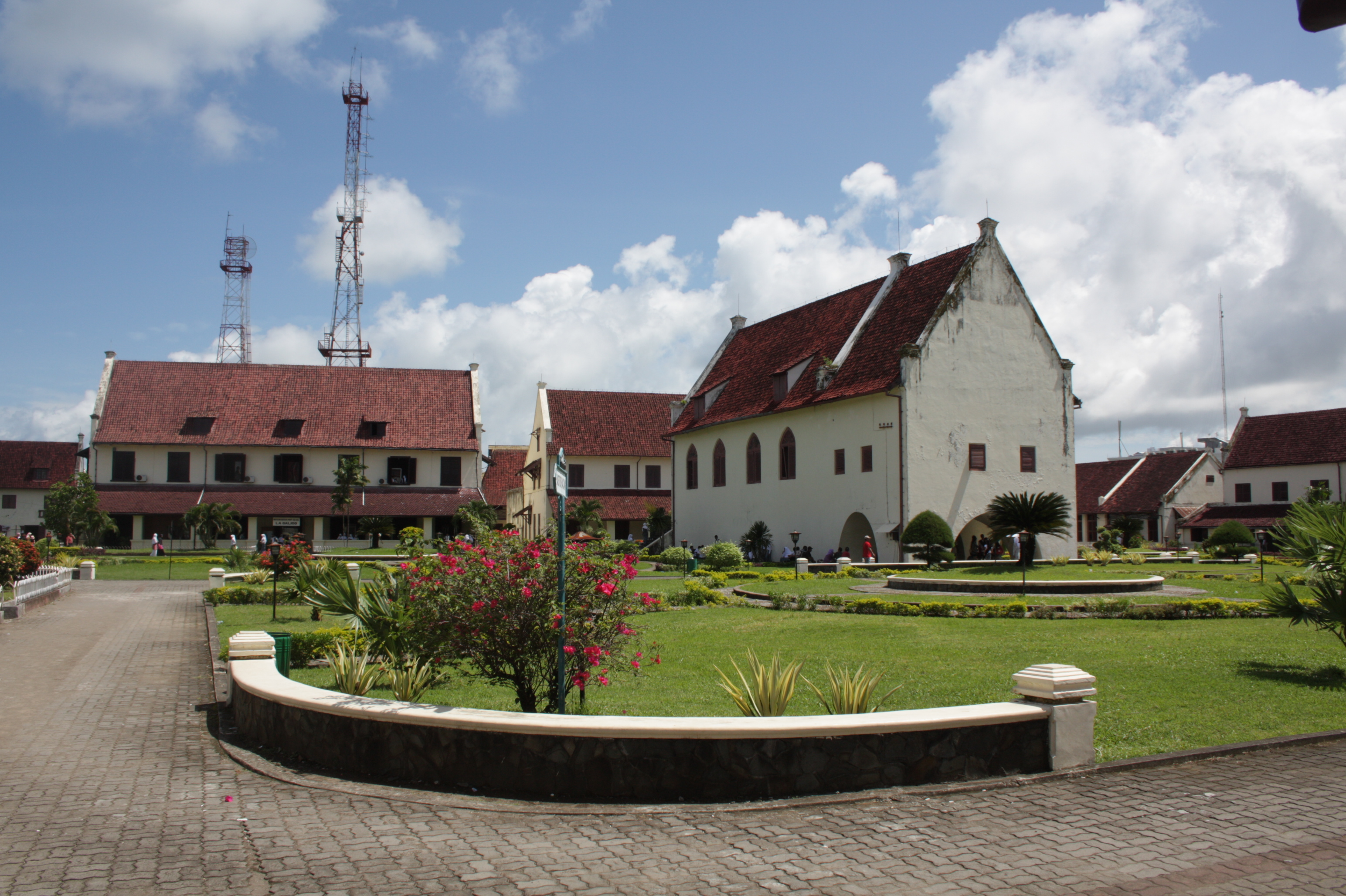
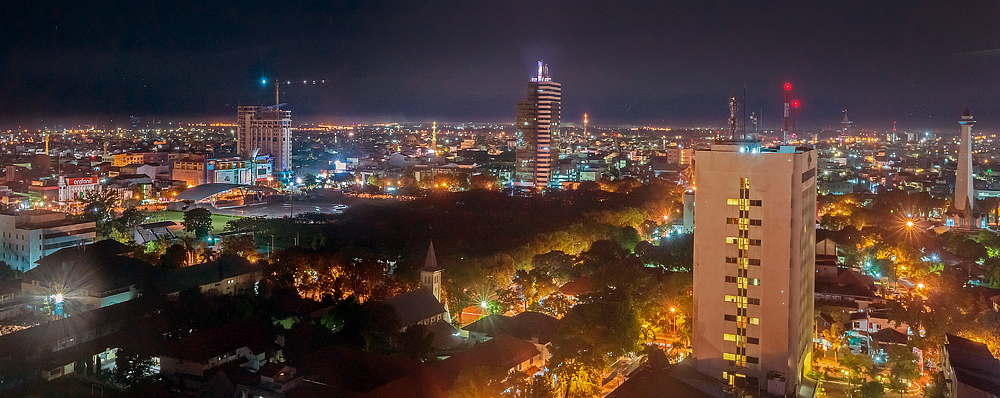
- Makassar sea side Gowa Gunung Sorongan Paddy field in Takalar Fort Rotterdam Makassar skyline From top, left to right: Fort Rotterdam in Makassar, Al-Fityan School in Gowa Regency, view of Mount Sorongan in Pangkajene and Islands Regency, Paddy fields in Takalar Regency.

- Country: Indonesia
- Province: South Sulawesi
- Core city: Makassar
- Regencies: Gowa Regency; Maros Regency; Takalar Regency; Pangkajene and Islands Regency

Area
  - Metro: 2,666.63 km^{2} (1,029.59 sq mi)

Population (mid 2023 estimate)
  - Urban: 1,936,000
  - Metro: 3,332,415
  - Metro density: 1,249.67/km^{2} (3,236.64/sq mi)
- Time zone: UTC+8 (Indonesia Central Time)
- GDP metro: 2023
- Total: ▲Rp 327.280 trillion ▲US$ 21.472 billion ▲US$ 68.767 billion (PPP)
- Per capita: ▲Rp 98.211 million ▲US$ 6,443 ▲US$ 20,635 (PPP)

The Makassar metropolitan area, known locally as Mamminasatapa (Makasar: ᨆᨆᨗᨊᨔᨈᨄ, romanized: Mamminasatapa); (an acronym of Makassar–Maros–Sungguminasa–Takalar–Pangkep) is a metropolitan area located on Sulawesi island in Indonesia. This area includes Makassar City and its buffer areas such as Maros Regency, Gowa Regency, Takalar Regency, and Pangkajene Islands Regency. This region is also an icon of South Sulawesi province and the largest metropolitan area in Eastern Indonesia. It has an area of 2,666.63 km^{2}, and a 2023 estimate had a population of 3,332,415

== Definition ==
In Makassar language, the word Mamminasata means "expression of ideals, feelings, or hopes that are coveted for all of us".

The national government regards the Makassar Metropolitan Area as including Makassar, Maros Regency, Gowa Regency, Takalar Regency, and Pangkajene Islands Regency. Pankajene Island is now included in the Metropolitan Area.

Indonesian President Joko Widodo has called Mamminasatapa the gateway to Eastern Indonesia.

== Demographics ==
Administrative Region	Area (km^{2})	Pop'n 2023 estimate	Density (per km^{2}) 2019
Makassar	175.77	1,526,677	8,685.3
Gowa Regency	686.51	609,277	887.4
Maros Regency	1,237.84	331,000	267.4
Takalar Regency	566.51	298,688	527.2
Pangkajene and Islands Regency	1,112.29	566,773	509.6
Mamminasatapa	3,778.92	3,332,415	881.8

== Geography ==
This metropolitan was built to support sea trade in eastern Indonesia. Following the inauguration of Makassar New Port by the President of the Republic of Indonesia on February 22, 2024, it will become one of the largest ports in Indonesia after the port of Tanjung Priok in North Jakarta. The existence of Mamminasatapa also provides a role and impact on the development of the Indonesian New Capital City (IKN) as the main supplier of food because of the closest potential for agriculture and animal husbandry.

== Infrastructure ==
President Jokowi explored regional readiness related to the plan to build a stadium in Sudiang. The President also ensured the sustainability of the construction of the Maros-Bone axis road and the completion of the Makassar-Parepare Railway

== See also ==
- List of metropolitan areas in Indonesia
- Jakarta metropolitan area
- Surabaya metropolitan area
- Bandung metropolitan area
- Medan metropolitan area
- Semarang metropolitan area
- Padang metropolitan area
