= Manado metropolitan area =

Manado metropolitan area Bimindo
- Metropolitan area
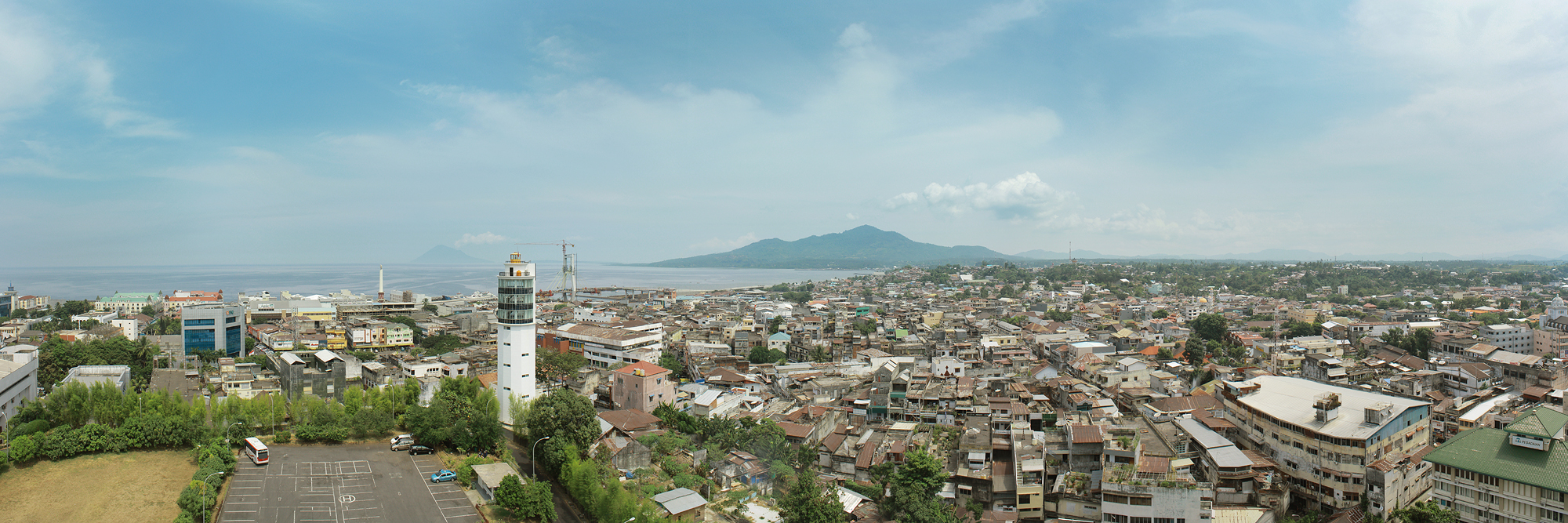
- Panoramic view of Manado
- Country: Indonesia
- Province: North Sulawesi
- Core city: Manado
- Satellite city: Bitung; Tomohon
- Regencies: Minahasa Regency; North Minahasa Regency

Area
  - Metro: 2,840.75 km^{2} (1,096.82 sq mi)

Population
  - Metropolitan area: 1,377,815
  - Density: 513.5/km^{2} (1,330/sq mi)
- Time zone: UTC+8 (Indonesia Central Time)
- Vehicle registration: DB
- GDP metro: 2023
- Total: ▲Rp 117.534 trillion ▲US$ 7.711 billion ▲US$ 24.695 billion (PPP)
- Per capita: ▲Rp 85.335 million ▲US$ 5,599 ▲US$ 17,930 (PPP)

The Manado metropolitan area, known locally as Bimindo (an acronym of Bitung–Minahasa–Manado), is a metropolitan area anchored by the city of Manado in North Sulawesi, Indonesia. It includes the cities of Bitung and Tomohon, as well as Minahasa Regency and North Minahasa Regency. It is the second-largest metropolitan area in Sulawesi with an estimated population of over 1.377 million as of mid 2023.

== Area and population ==
The official metropolitan area centred on Manado includes three cities (Manado, Bitung and Tomohon) and two regencies (Minahasa and North Minahasa).

City / Regency	District	Area (km^{2})	Population (2024)	Pop. Density (per km^{2})
Manado Municipality	All 11 districts	162.35	459,409	2,830
Bitung Municipality	All 8 districts	313.51	216,026	689
Tomohon Municipality	All 5 districts	169.10	103,812	613
Minahasa Regency (part)
Minahasa Regency (part)	Pineleng	49.30	27,295	554
Minahasa Regency (part)	Tombulu	73.43	17,151	234
Minahasa Regency (part)	Mandolang	47.05	20,148	428
North Minahasa Regency (part)	Kema	78.76	17,707	225
North Minahasa Regency (part)	Kauditan	108.20	29,142	269
North Minahasa Regency (part)	Airmadidi	8.66	31,036	3,584
North Minahasa Regency (part)	Kalawat	39.03	32,217	825
North Minahasa Regency (part)	Dimembe	166.43	29,735	179
North Minahasa Regency (part)	Talawaan	82.51	21,554	261
Manado Metropolitan Area		1,298.33	1,005,232	774

== See also ==
- List of metropolitan areas by population
- Jakarta metropolitan area
- Surabaya metropolitan area
- Bandung metropolitan area
- Padang metropolitan area
