= Takalar Regency =

Regency in South Sulawesi, Indonesia

Coordinates: 5°25′S 119°35′E

Takalar Regency Kabupaten Takalar
- Regency
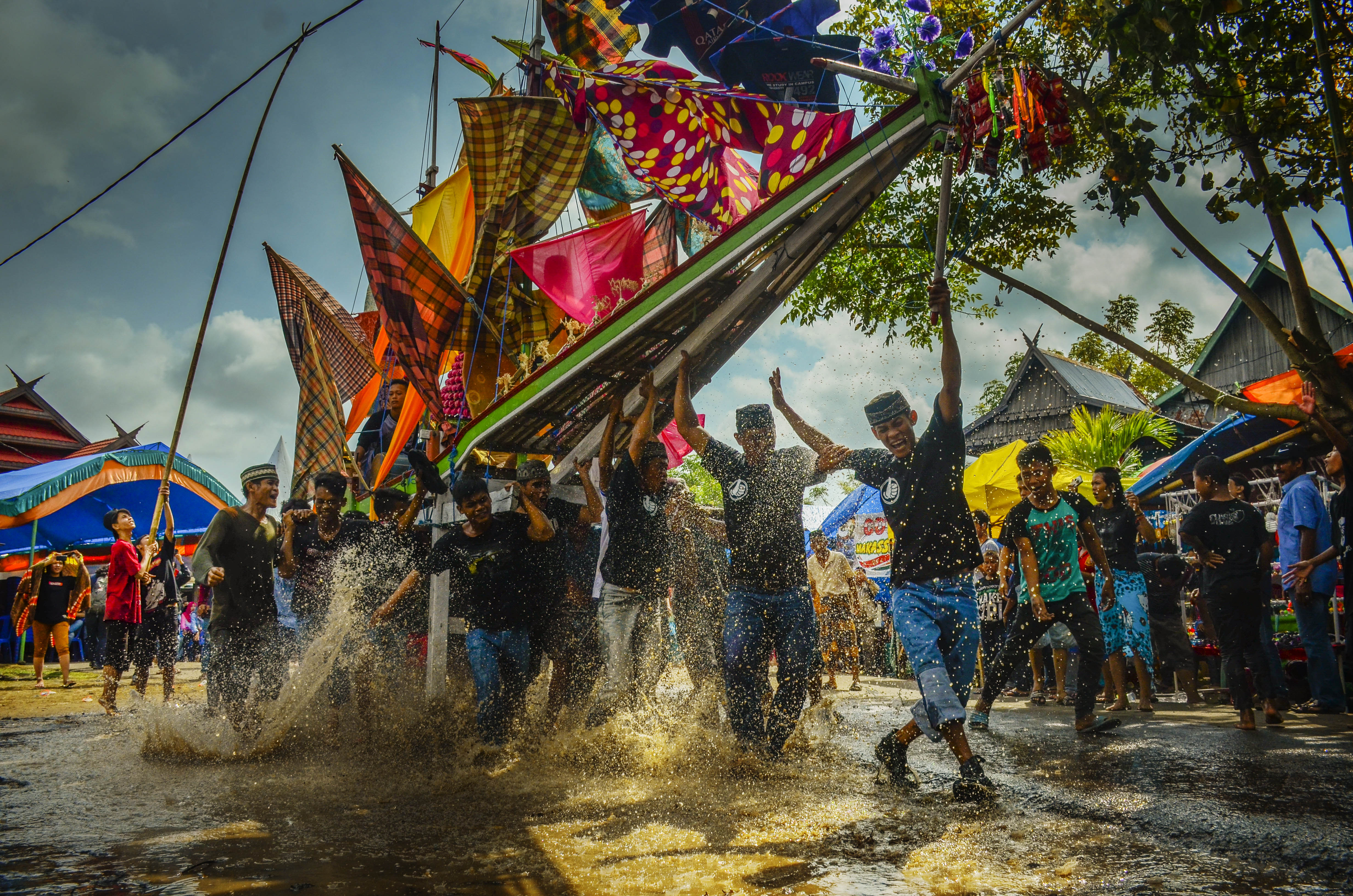
- Maudu Lompoa tradition in Cikoang river

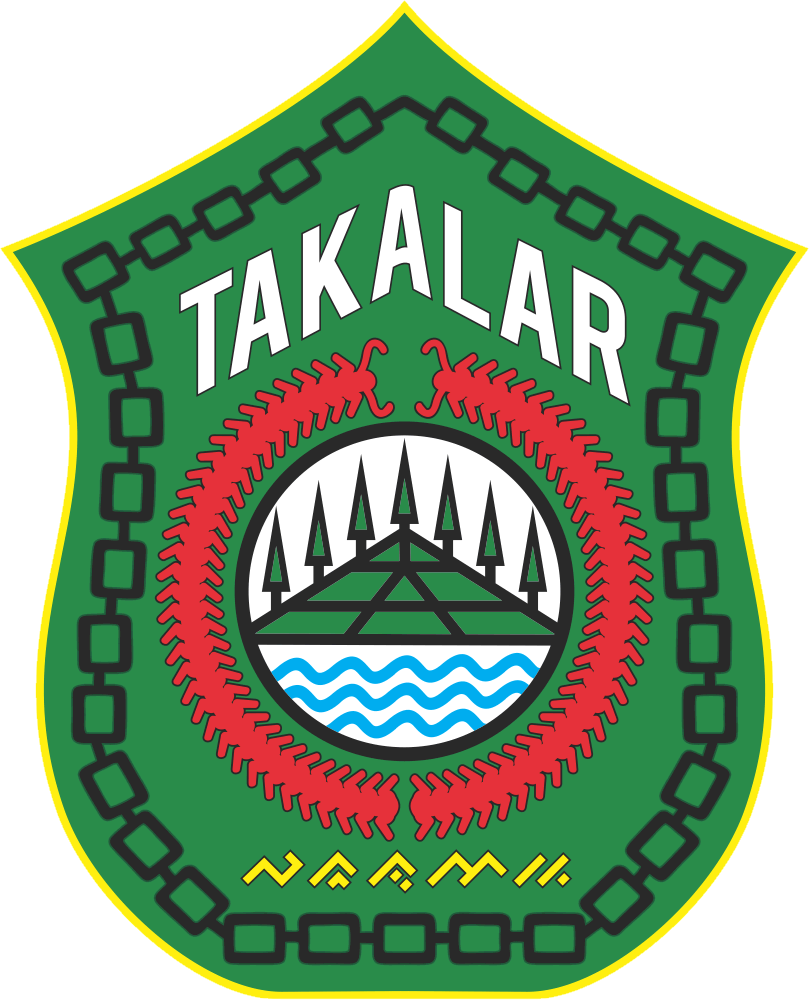
- Coat of arms

- Location within South Sulawesi
- Country: Indonesia
- Province: South Sulawesi
- Capital: Pattallassang

Government
  - Regent: Firdaus Daeng Manye
  - Vice Regent: Hengky Yasin

Area
  - Total: 566.51 km^{2} (218.73 sq mi)

Population (mid 2025 estimate)
  - Total: 335,846
  - Density: 592.83/km^{2} (1,535.4/sq mi)
- Time zone: UTC+8 (WITA)

Takalar Regency (Makasar: ᨈᨀᨒᨑ, romanized: Takalara’, Makasar pronunciation: [taˈkalaraʔ]) is a regency of South Sulawesi Province, Indonesia. It covers an area of 566.51 km^{2} and had a population of 269,603 at the 2010 census and 300,853 at the 2020 census. The official population estimate for mid 2025 was 335,846 (comprising 164,338 males and 171,508 females). The entire regency lies within the official metropolitan area of the city of Makassar (the metropolitan area is known as Mamminasata). The principal towns are at Galesong and at Pattallassang, the administrative centre.

== Administrative division ==
At the 2010 census the regency was divided into nine districts (Indonesian: kecamatan), but a tenth district (Kepulauan Tanakeke) was subsequently cut out of Mappakusunggu District, and two additional districts were subsequently added in late 2022 - Polombangkeng Timur cut out from part of Polombangkeng Utara District, and Laikang from part of Mangara Bombang District. These twelve districts are tabulated below with their areas, populations at the 2010 and 2020 census, and the official mid 2025 population estimates. The table also includes the locations of the district administrative centres, the number of villages in each district (totaling 86 rural desa and 24 urban kelurahan), and its postal codes.

Kode Wilayah	Name of District (kecamatan)	Area in km^{2}	Pop'n census 2010	Pop'n census 2020	Pop'n Estimate mid 2025	Admin centre	No. of villages	Post codes
73.05.02	Mangara Bombang	33.28	36,689	41,085	24,304	Mangadu	6 ^{(a)}	92261
73.05.12	Laikang	67.21	^{(b)}	^{(b)}	21,948	Cikoang	6	92261
73.05.01	Mappakusunggu	15.12	15,139	9,461	10,559	Cilallang	4 ^{(c)}	92232
73.05.08	Sanrobone	29.36	13,276	15,257	17,563	Sanrobone	6	92231
73.05.10	Kepulauan Tanakeke ^{(d)} (Tanakeke Islands)	30.15	^{(e)}	6,984	8,077	Maccini Baji	6	92232
73.05.03	Polombangkeng Selatan (South Polombangkeng)	88.07	26,754	29,237	31,769	Bulukunyi	11 ^{(f)}	92252
73.05.07	Pattallassang	25.31	34,729	39,275	42,962	Pattallassang	9 ^{(g)}	92211
73.05.04	Polombangkeng Utara (North Polombangkeng)	56.51	45,825	50,255	34,474	Palleko	11 ^{(h)}	92221
73.05.11	Polombangkeng Timur (East Polombangkeng)	155.74	^{(i)}	^{(i)}	20,950	Komara	8	92221
73.05.05	Galesong Selatan (South Galesong)	24.71	23,854	26,985	30,652	Bonto Kassi	13	92254
73.05.09	Galesong ^{(j)}	25.93	37,371	41,003	46,342	Galesong Kota	17	92254 & 92255
73.05.06	Galesong Utara (North Galesong)	15.11	35,966	41,311	46,246	Bontolebang	14 ^{(k)}	92255
	Totals	566.51	269,603	300,853	335,846	Pattallassang	110	

Notes: (a) includes the kelurahan of Mandadu. (b) the 2010 and 2020 population figures are included in those for Mangara Bombang District, from which it was cut out.
(c) includes the kelurahan of Takalar. (d) comprises a group of eight offshore islands - Bauluang, Dayangdayangan, Labbotallua, Lantangpeo, Pokko, Rewataya, Satangnga and Tanakeke.
(e) the 2010 figure is included in the figure for Mappakusunggu District. (f) includes the 6 kelurahan of Bonto Kadatto, Bulukunyi, Canrego, Pa'bundukang, Pattene and Rajaya.
(g) all 9 are kelurahan - Bajeng, Kalabbirang, Mardekaya, Pallantikang, Pappa, Pattallassang, Sabintang, Salaka and Sombalabella.
(h) includes the 6 kelurahan of Malewang, Manongkoki, Mattompodalle, Palleko, Panrannuangku and Parangluara.
(i) the 2010 and 2020 population figures are included in those for Polombangkeng Utara District, from which it was cut out.
(j) includes offshore island of Pulau Sanrobengi. (k) includes the kelurahan of Bontolebang.

The regency is virtually split into two parts, with part of Gowa Regency nearly reaching the coast between Galesong Selatan and Sanrobone districts. The northern part (the three Galesong districts) forms an urbanised narrow coastal strip stretching south from Makassar city, plus the small offshore island of Pulau Sanrobengi; it covers 65.75 km^{2} with 123,240 inhabitants in mid 2025. The much larger southern part comprises the remaining nine districts.
