= Bandung metropolitan area =

Bandung Basin Cekungan Bandung
- Metropolitan area

Other transcription(s)
  - Sundanese: ᮎᮨᮊᮥᮍᮔ᮪ ᮘᮔ᮪ᮓᮥᮀ
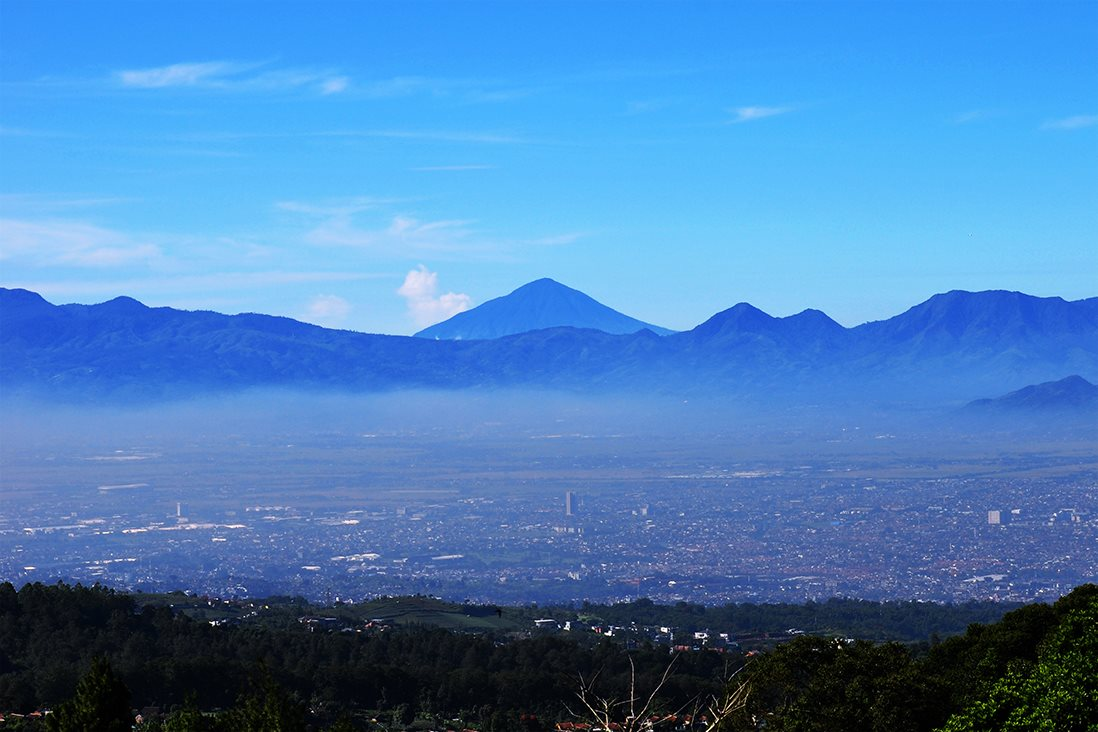
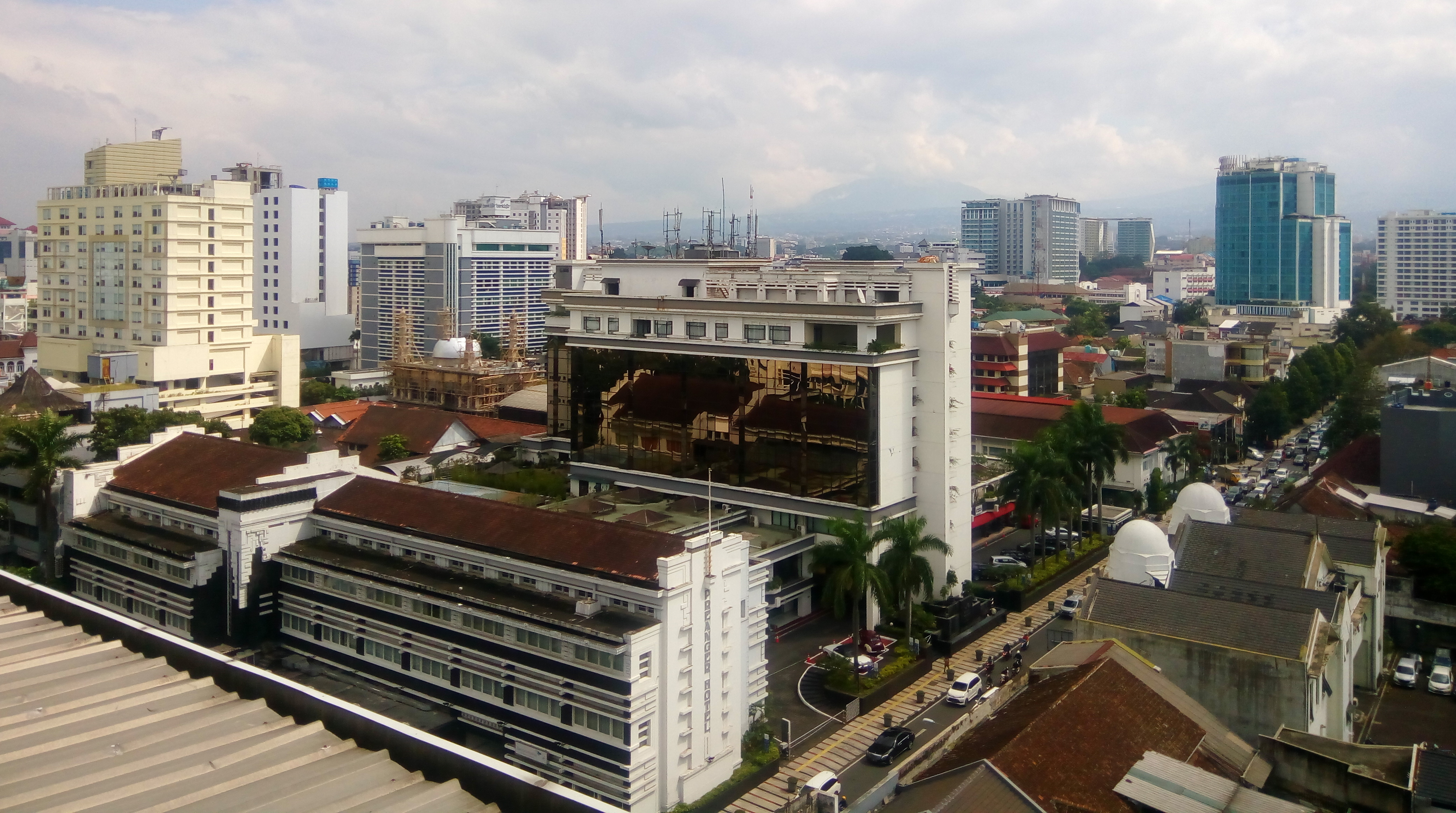
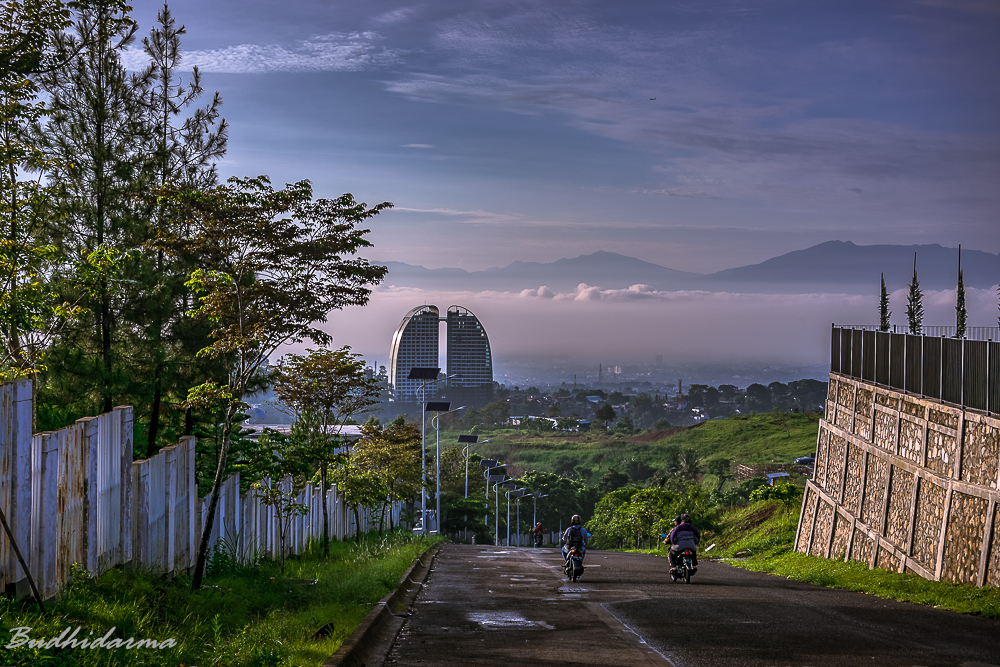
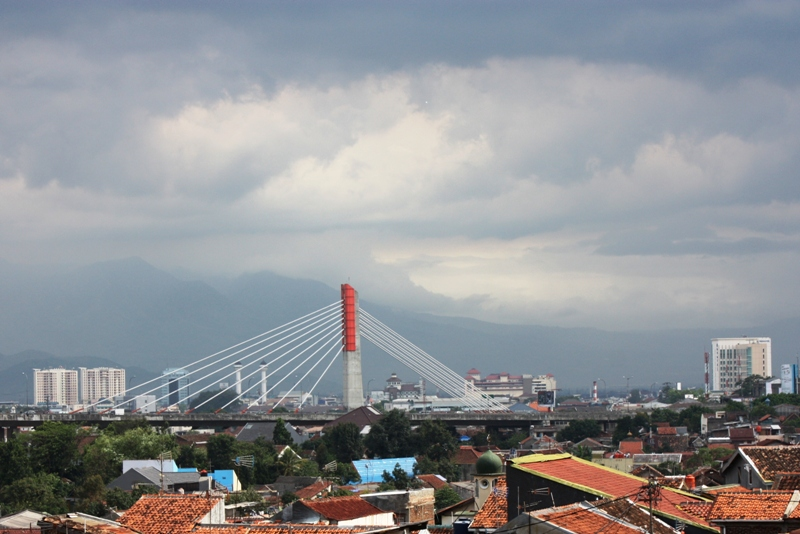
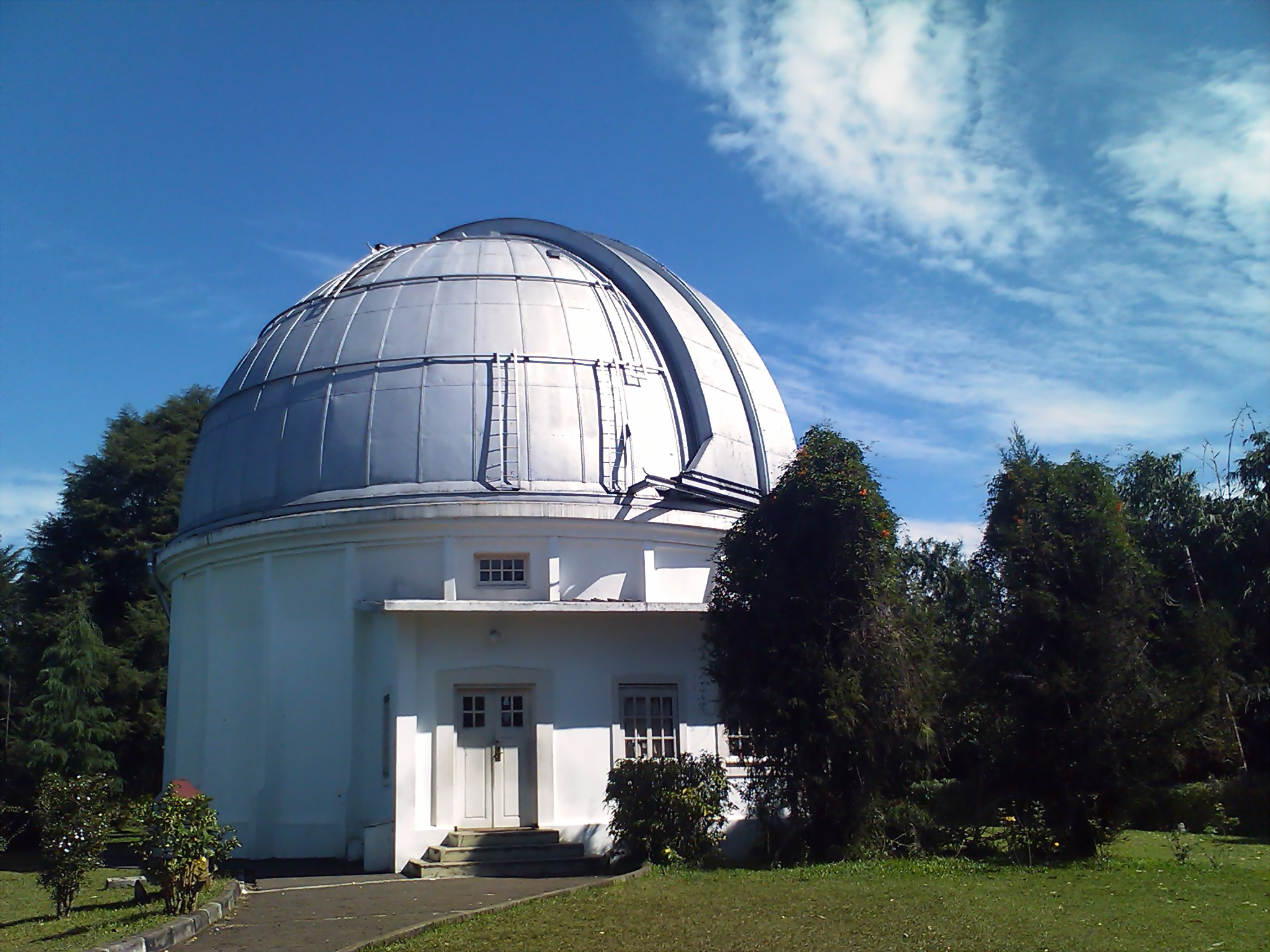
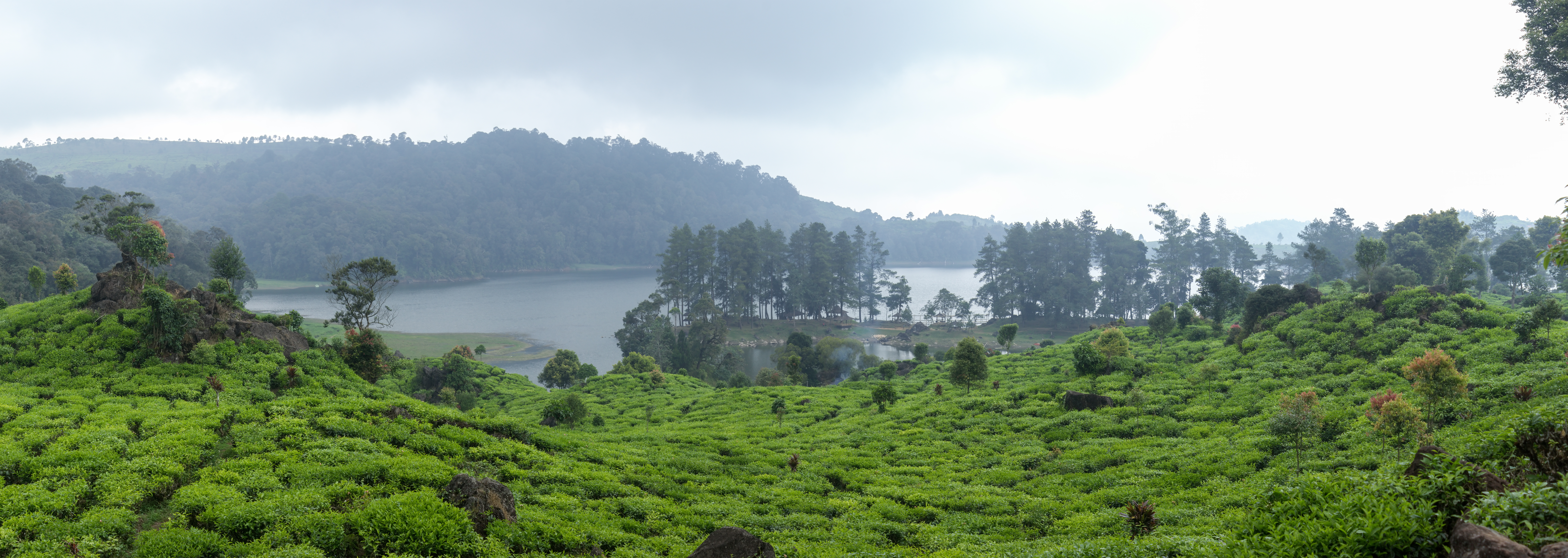
- From top, left to right: Bandung Basin viewed from Mount Batu, Bandung skyline, view of Central Bandung from the north, Pasupati Bridge in Bandung, Bosscha Observatory in West Bandung Regency, Patenggang Lake in Bandung Regency.

- Coordinates: 6°55′26″S 107°36′23″E
- Country: Indonesia
- Province: West Java
- Core city: Bandung
- Satellite city: Cimahi
- Regencies: Bandung Regency; West Bandung Regency part of Sumedang Regency

Area
  - Metro: 3,484.08 km^{2} (1,345.21 sq mi)

Population (mid 2023 estimate)
  - Urban: 7,203,000
  - Metro: 9,054,175
  - Metro density: 2,598.73/km^{2} (6,730.67/sq mi)
- Time zone: UTC+7 (Indonesia Western Time)
- Postcodes: 40xxx
- Area codes: (62)22
- Vehicle registration: D and Z
- GDP (nominal): 2023
- Total: ▲Rp 646.006 trillion ▲US$ 42.383 billion ▲US$ 135.736 billion (PPP)
- Per capita: ▲Rp 74.441 million ▲US$ 4,883 ▲US$ 15,641 (PPP)
- Highest elevation 2,608 m/8,556 ft (Mount Kendang, in Bandung Regency)

The Bandung Metropolitan Area, officially called the Bandung Basin (Sundanese: ᮎᮨᮊᮥᮍᮔ᮪ ᮘᮔ᮪ᮓᮥᮀ, romanized: Cekungan Bandung); or Greater Bandung (Bandung Raya), is a metropolitan area surrounding the city of Bandung, West Java, Indonesia. It was home to over nine million people in mid 2023 and is composed of regencies and cities previously part of the Dutch East Indies era "Central Priangan Residency" administration.

Due to ongoing development in urban areas between Bandung, Kertajati International Airport, Aerotropolis and Patimban International Seaport, the West Java provincial government and the Regional Planning Board (BAPPEDA) has prepared and publicized a blueprint for a newly defined (extended) Bandung Metropolitan area with a total area more than 5,500 km^{2} and a population greater than 11 million people.

== Location ==
Bandung is located in a mountainous plateau region in the central portion of West Java province and has the third highest population of any metropolitan area in Indonesia.

== Western Java urban corridor ==
The Bandung metropolitan area begins less than 20 km from the eastern edge of the metropolitan area of Greater Jakarta ("Jabodetabek") near Cianjur city, and is adjacent (contiguous) with the Jabodetabekjur-Cirangkarta definition for Jakarta's extended metropolitan area (250 km or so long) at its northern border with Purwakarta Regency. Stretching from Serang Regency in Banten Province to include Greater Bandung, this relatively narrow urban corridor hemmed in by volcanoes is home to estimated 50 million people as of 2020, or a third of the islands population and a bit less than a fifth of the entire nation.

== Definition ==
Population density of Java and Madura by district as of 2025, with major urban areas shown

The Bandung Metropolitan area was officially defined as covering Bandung Regency and West Bandung Regency (which until 2007 was part of Bandung Regency), plus part (5 districts) of Sumedang Regency, together with the cities of Bandung and Cimahi.

Administrative division	Area in km^{2}	Population 2010 Census	Population 2020 Census	Population mid 2024 Estimate	Population density (per km^{2} mid 2024)
Bandung City	166,59	2,394,873	2,444,160	2,528,160	15,176
Cimahi City	42.43	541,177	568,400	598,700	14,110
City proper	209.02	2,936,050	3,012,560	3,126,860	14,960
Bandung Regency	1,740.84	3,178,543	3,623,790	3,753,120	2,156
West Bandung Regency	1,283.44	1,506,448	1,788,336	1,884,190	1,468
Sumedang Regency (part)	224.53	349,750	365,622	379,638	1,691
Bandung Basin	3,457.83	7,970,791	8,790,308	9,143,808	2,644

As subsequently extended, the new metropolitan region includes the entire Sumedang Regency with parts of Subang Regency and Majalengka Regency; and it borders the Cirebon metropolitan area. Together, the two metro areas comprise over 14 million people Sources: (Budan Pusat Statistik 2023 and earlier, Indonesia)

- https://web.archive.org/web/20101113175446/http://www.bps.go.id/hasilSP2010/jabar/3211.pdf (for kecamatan)
- https://web.archive.org/web/20120628013636/http://www.bps.go.id/aboutus.php?sp=0&kota=32 Tabel Hasil Sensus Penduduk 2010 Provinsi JAWA BARAT (for all others)
- https://web.archive.org/web/20131014170450/http://www.jabarprov.go.id/index.php/subMenu/75 Sumber : Database SIAK Provinsi Jawa Barat Tahun 2011
- (BPS Jabar 2015) Satudata Jawa Barat BPS Jumlah Penduduk Kabupaten/ Kota di Jawa Barat Tahun 2010 - 2015
- Note that area figures in Indonesia are frequently updated as the country is seismically and volcanically very active, and land subsidence due to changes in land use and population pressures. 3 kecamatan data were not updated, assuming no changes to older data from 2010 data.

== See also ==
- List of metropolitan areas in Indonesia
- Jakarta metropolitan area
- Surabaya metropolitan area
- Semarang metropolitan area
