= Surabaya metropolitan area =

Metropolitan area in East Java, Indonesia

Surabaya metropolitan area Gerbangkertosusila
- Megacity and Megalopolis

Other transcription(s)
  - Javanese: ꦒꦼꦂꦧꦁꦏꦼꦂꦠꦱꦸꦱꦶꦭ; Gěrbangkěrtåsusila
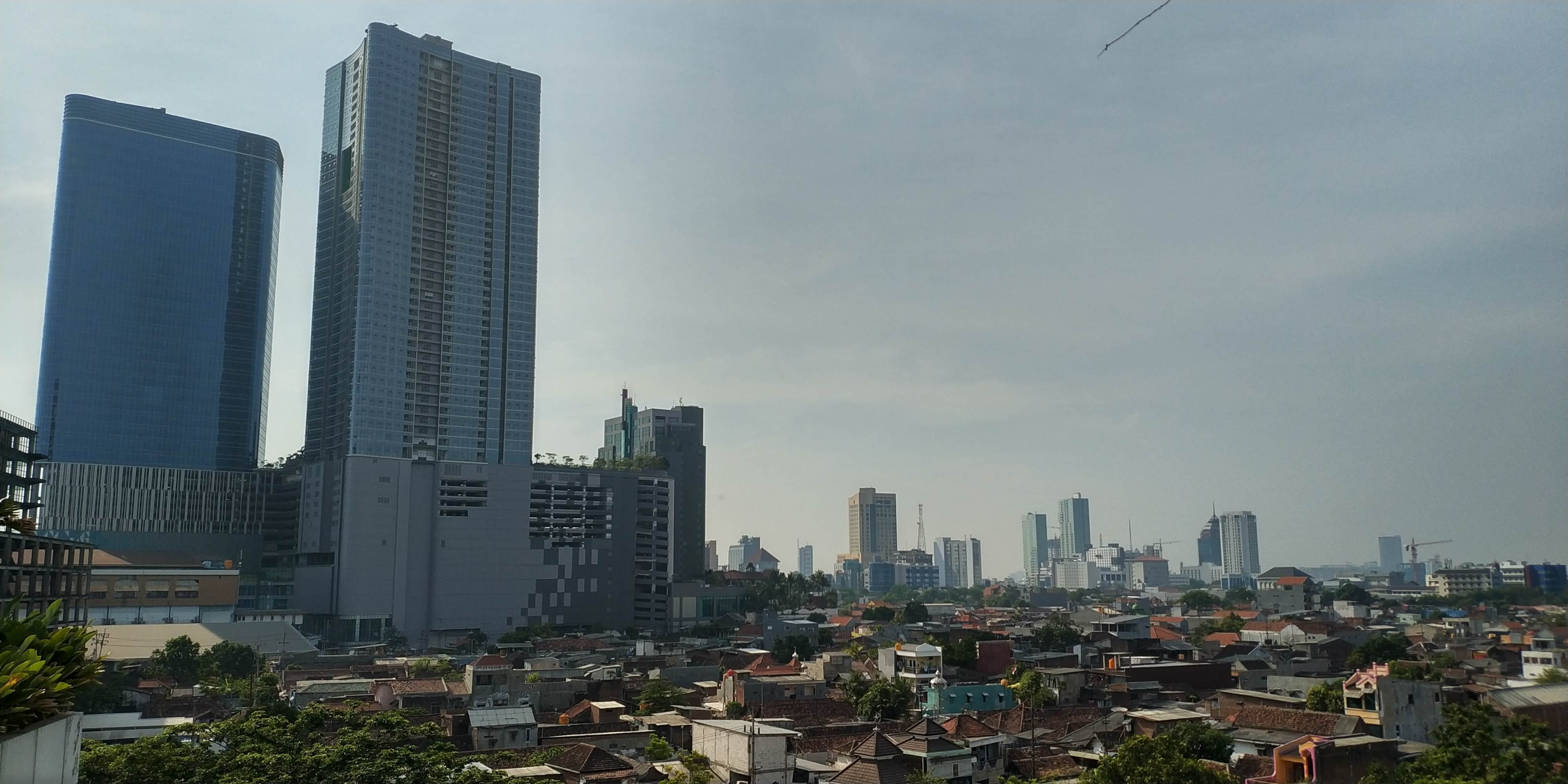
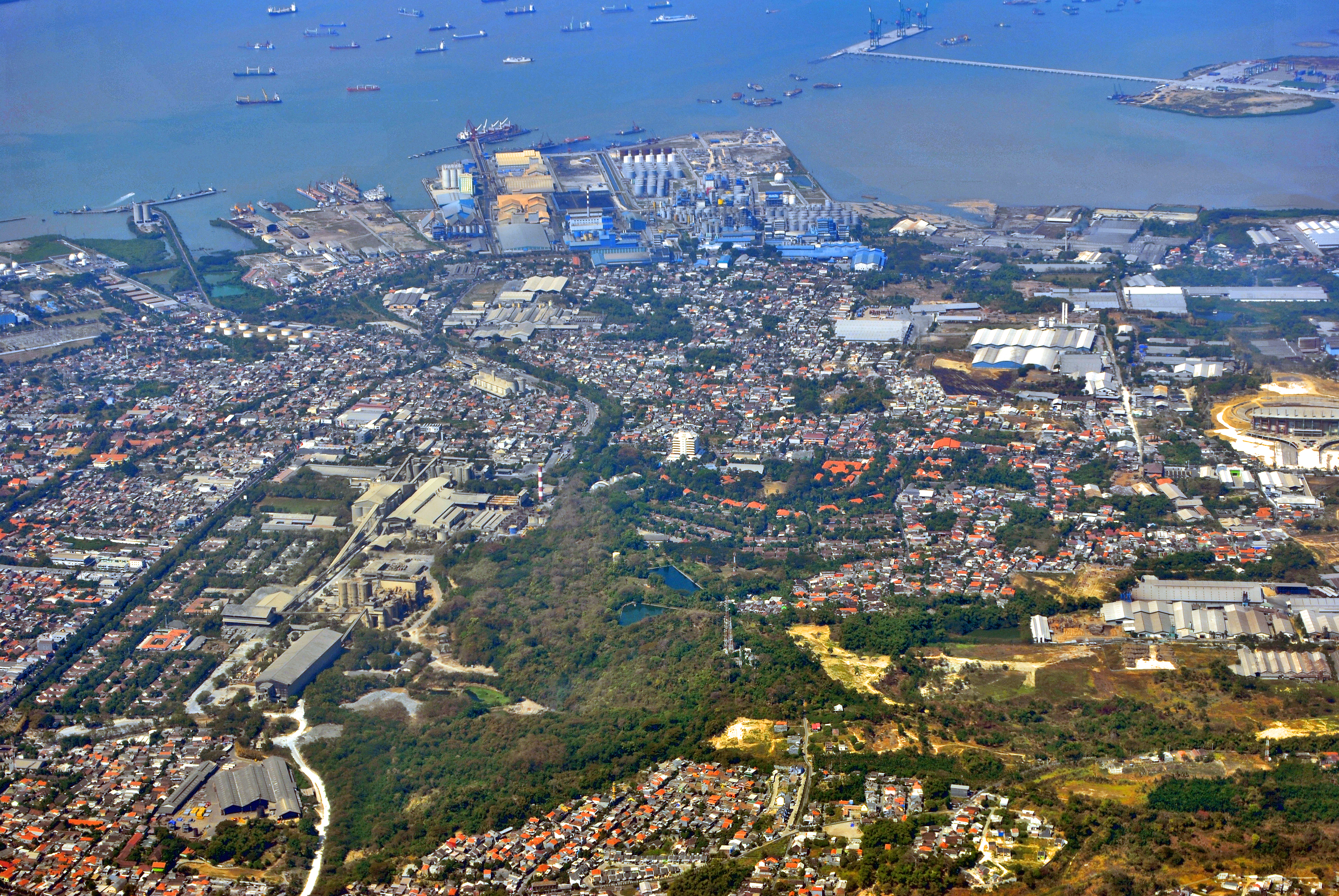
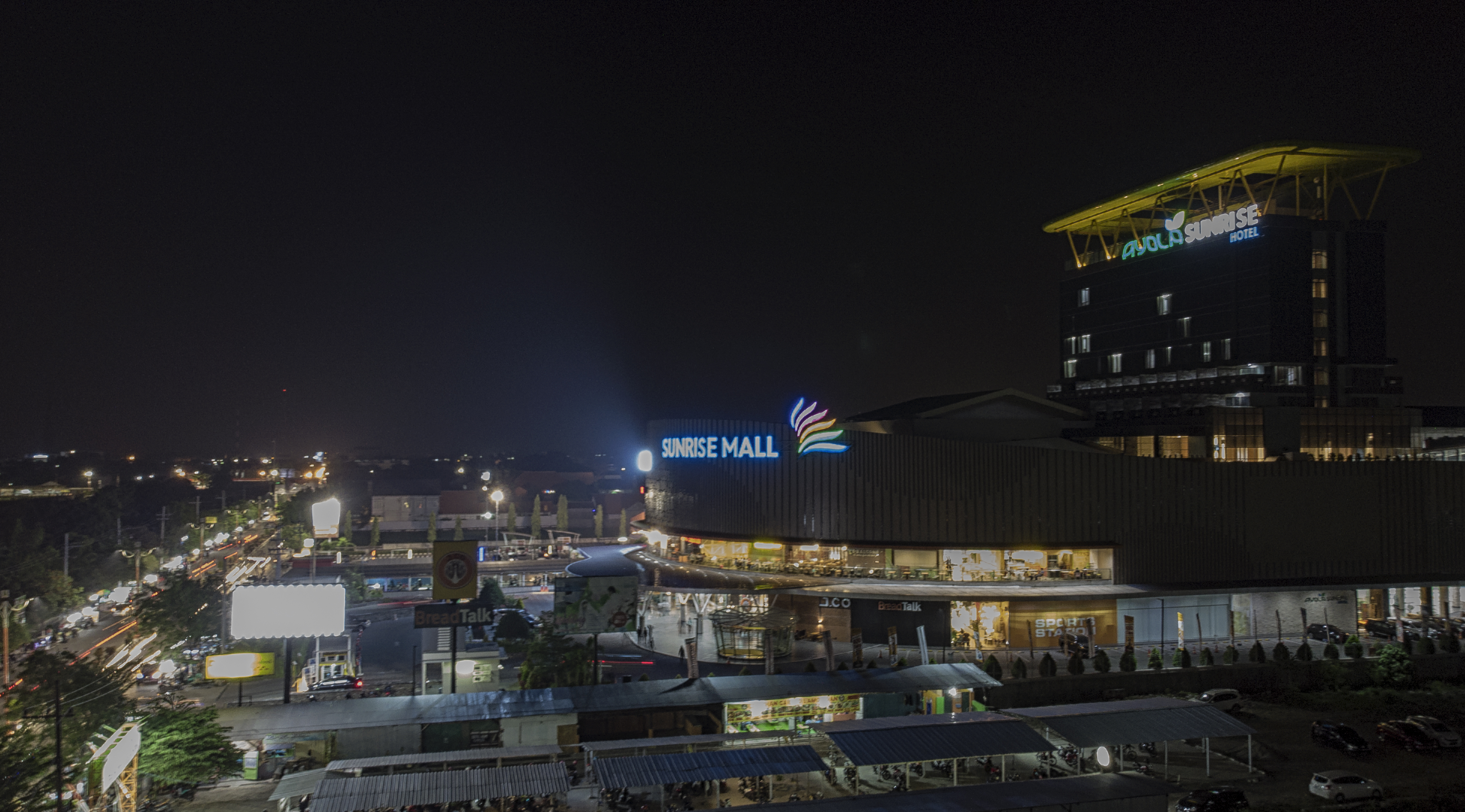
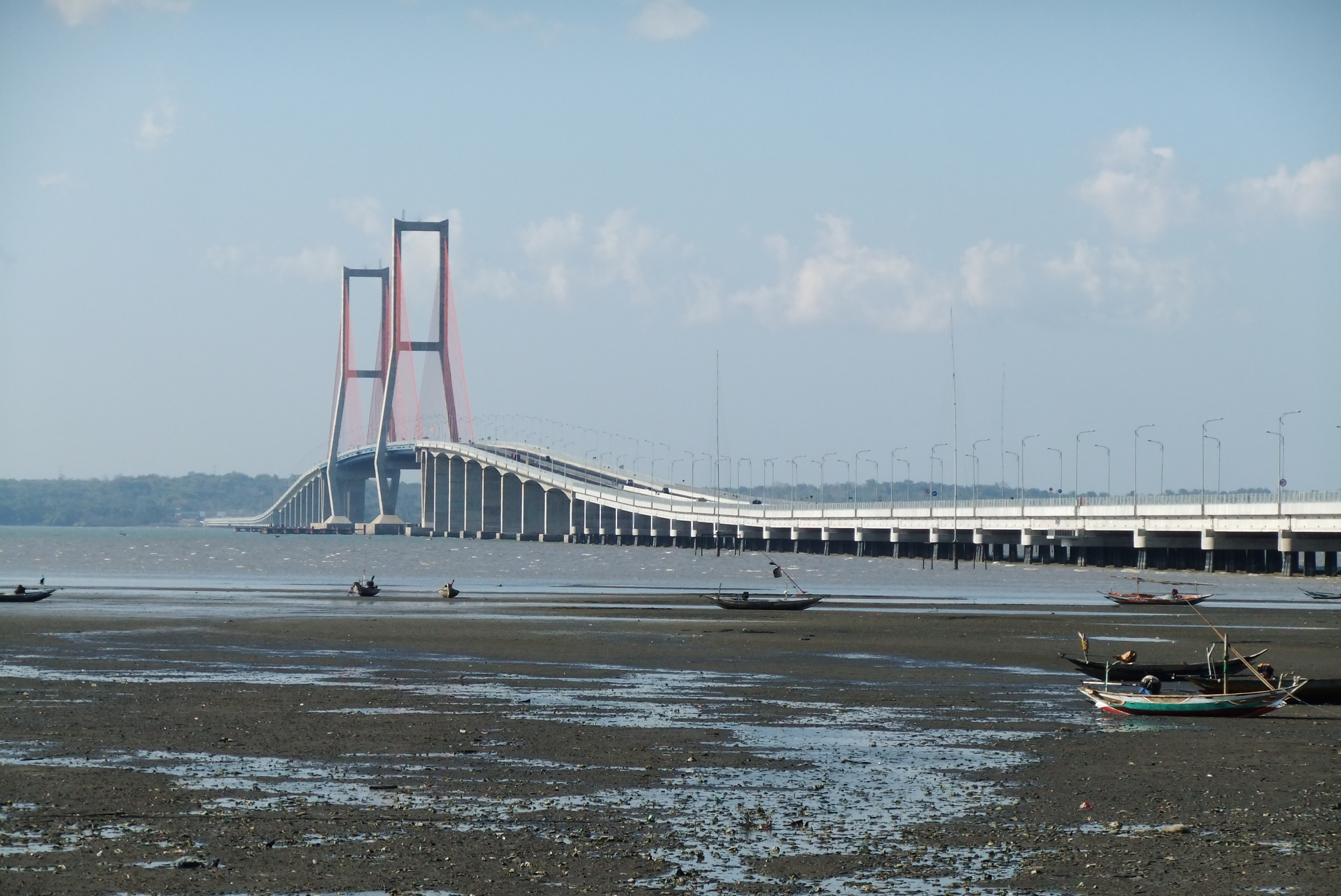
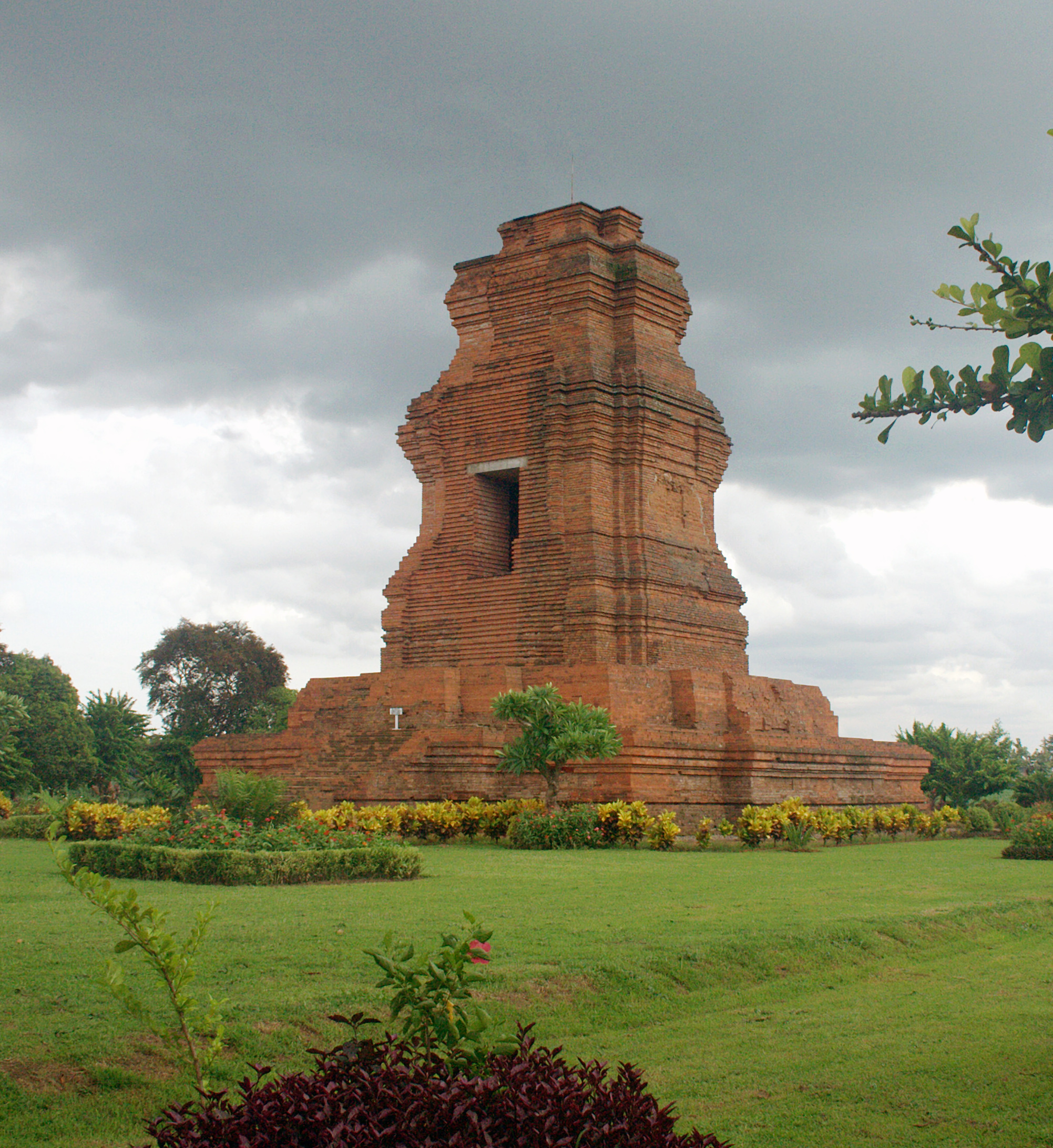
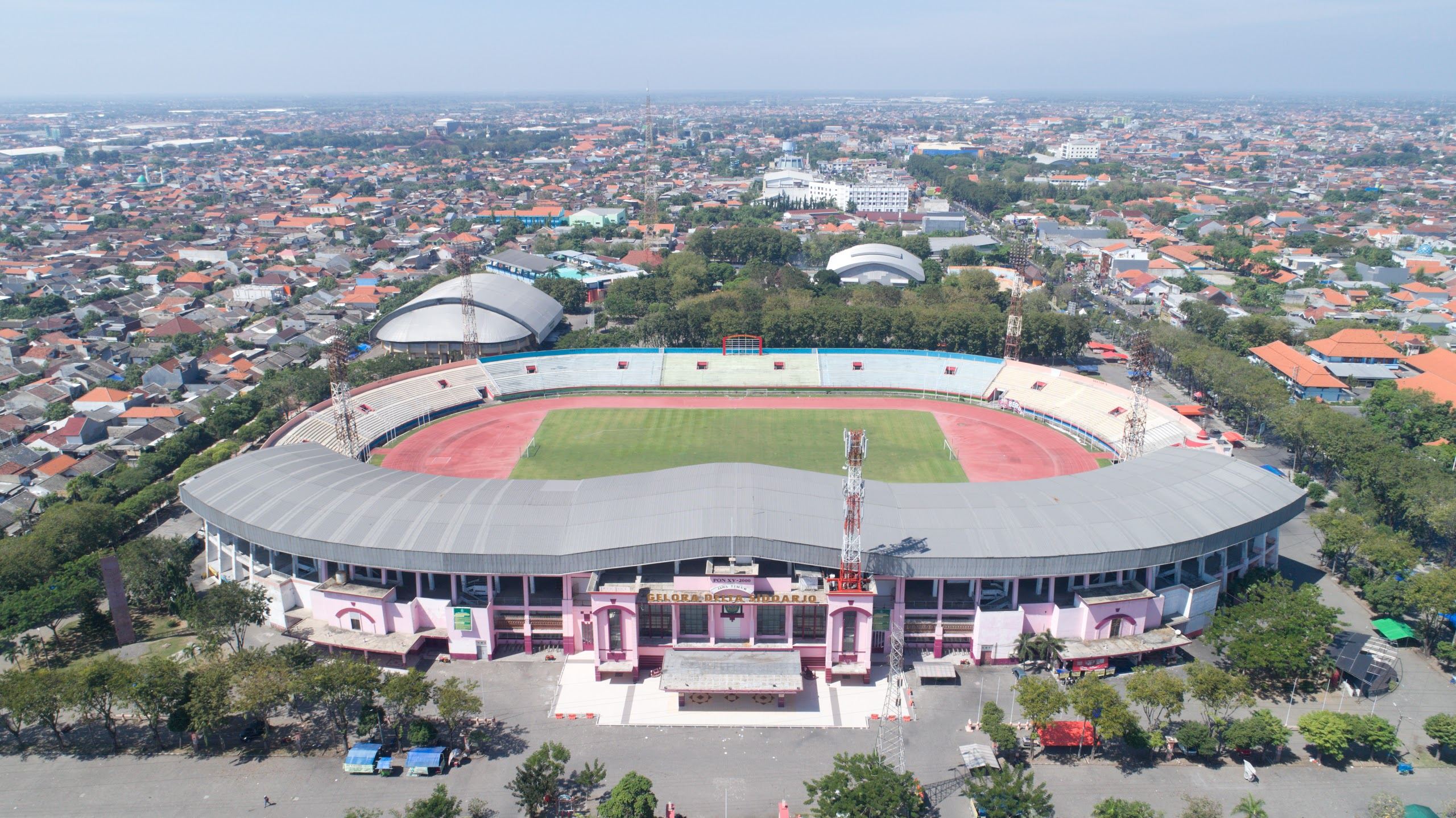
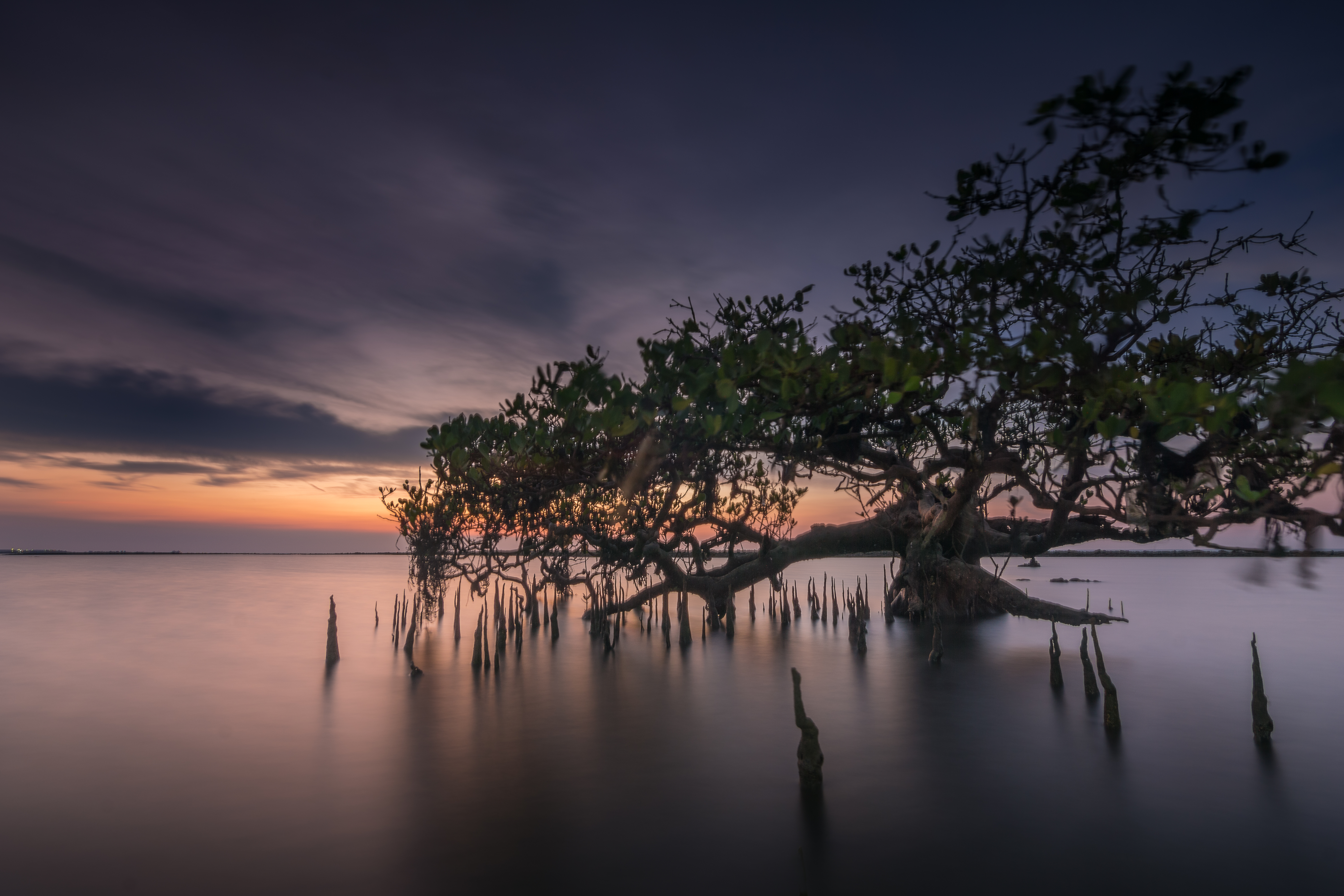
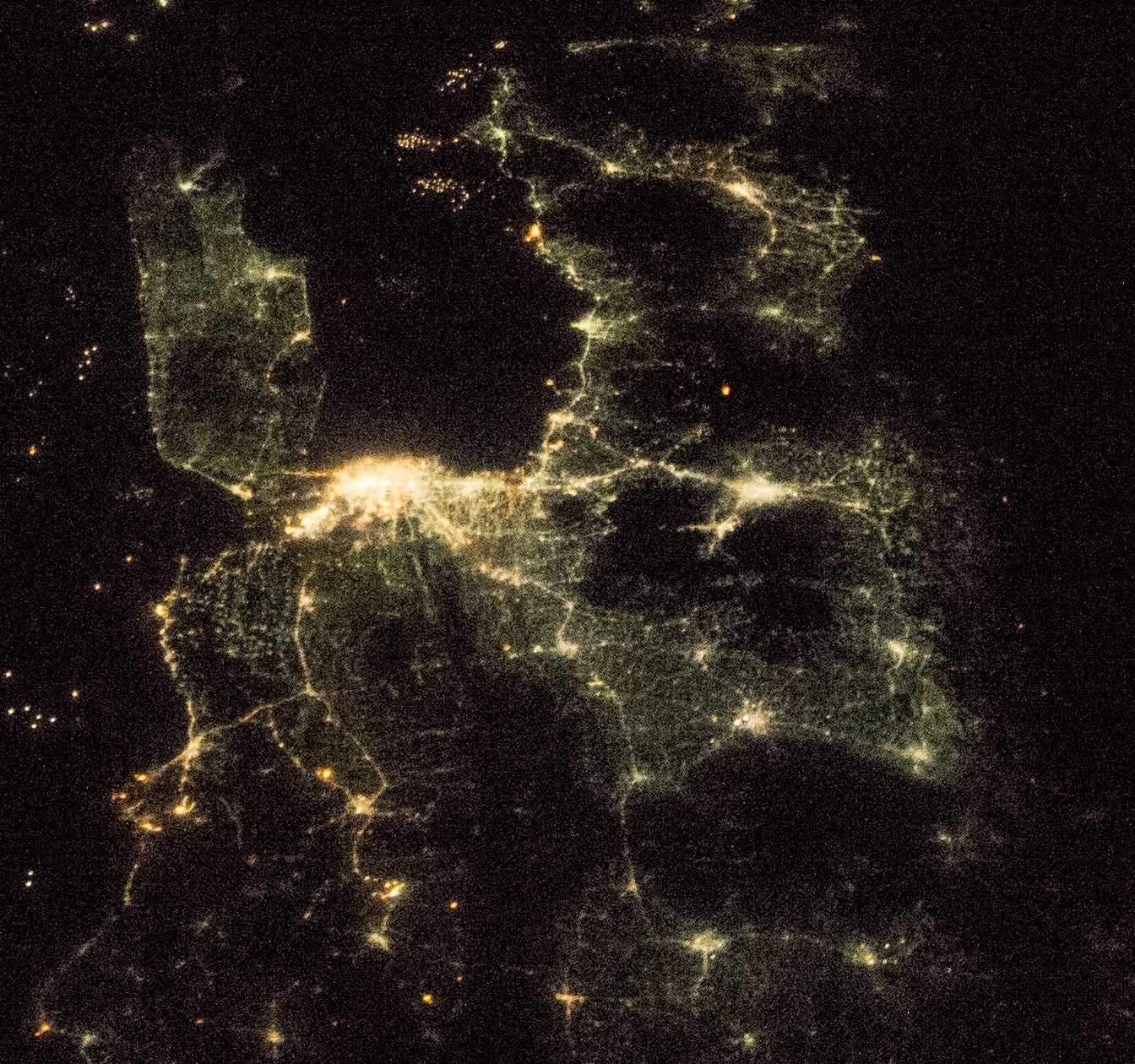
- From top, left to right: Downtown Surabaya, aerial view of Gresik Regency, Mojokerto at night, Suramadu Bridge that connects Surabaya and Bangkalan Regency, Brahu Temple Trowulan in Mojokerto Regency, Gelora Delta Stadium in Sidoarjo Regency, a mangrove tree in Lamongan Regency and ISS view of Greater Surabaya during nighttime.

- Country: Indonesia
- Province: East Java
- Core city: Surabaya
- Satellite city: Mojokerto
- Regencies: Gresik Regency; Bangkalan Regency; Mojokerto Regency; Sidoarjo Regency; Lamongan Regency

Area
  - Metro: 6,421.25 km^{2} (2,479.26 sq mi)

Population (mid 2025 estimate)
  - Urban: 6,388,585
  - Metro: 10,177,027
  - Metro density: 1,584.90/km^{2} (4,104.87/sq mi)

GDP Megacity
  - GDP (Note: Including Malang-Batu-Pasuruan): IDR 2,037,094 trillion (2023)
  - Nominal: US$ 133.647 billion (2023)
  - PPP: US$ 428.025 billion (2023)
- Time zone: UTC+7 (Indonesia Western Time)
- Postcodes: 6xxxx
- Area codes: (62)31, (62)321, (62)322
- Vehicle sign: L, S, W
- GDP metro: 2023
- Total: ▲Rp 1,541.080 trillion ▲US$ 101.105 billion ▲US$ 323.805 billion (PPP)
- Per capita: ▲Rp 130.624 million ▲US$ 8,570 ▲US$ 27,446 (PPP)
- Highest elevation 3,339 m/10,955 ft (Arjuno-Welirang, in Mojokerto Regency)

The Surabaya metropolitan area or Greater Surabaya, known locally as Gerbangkertosusila (Javanese: ꦒꦼꦂꦧꦁꦏꦼꦂꦠꦱꦸꦱꦶꦭ, romanized: Gěrbangkěrtåsusila, from Gresik-Bangkalan-Mojokerto-Surabaya-Sidoarjo-Lamongan), is a metropolitan area in East Java, Indonesia. It is the country's second-largest metropolitan area, after the Jakarta metropolitan area. Gerbangkertosusila had also been used in presidential decrees to refer to a larger region which includes Jombang, Bojonegoro, and Tuban Regencies.

== Definition ==
Grebangkertosusila is an official acronym of "Gresik Bangkalan Mojokerto Surabaya Sidoarjo Lamongan", a main metropolitan or planning area in East Java consisting of the seven cities and regencies with those names (Mojokerto is both a city and a separate regency). It has an area of 6,310.06 km^{2}, and at the 2020 Census had a population of 9,924,509, rising to 10,081,343 according to the official estimates as at mid 2025.

The national government regards the Surabaya Metropolitan Area as including only Surabaya, Sidoarjo Regency, and Gresik Regency, known as "Zona Surabaya Raya". Gresik Regency includes Bawean Island, covering some 196 km^{2} and lying north of Java; however Bawean Island is excluded from the Metropolitan Area.

== Demographics ==
Population density of Java and Madura by subdistrict as of 2022, with major urban areas shown

Surabaya traditionally constituted Indonesia's second-largest metropolitan area, after Jakarta, but fast growing Bandung Metropolitan Area (in West Java) is since 2005 more populous. However, the extended metropolitan area of Surabaya is second in Indonesia only to Jabodetabek. The areas and populations at the 2010 Census, the 2020 Census and according to the official estimates for mid 2025, are shown below for the component parts of the metropolitan area.

Administrative Region	Area (km^{2}) mid 2025	Pop'n 2010 Census	Pop'n 2020 Census	Pop'n mid 2025 estimate	Density (per km^{2}) mid 2025
Surabaya City	334.50	2,765,487	2,874,314	3,003,860	8,980
Gresik Regency^{(a)}	1,264.01	1,177,042	1,311,215	1,343,465	1,063
Sidoarjo Regency	719.34	1,941,497	2,082,800	2,041,260	2,838
Zona Surabaya Raya	2,317.85	5,884,026	6,268,329	6,388,585	2,756
Bangkalan Regency	1,301.03	906,761	1,060,377	1,112,956	855
Mojokerto Regency	969.36	1,025,443	1,119,209	1,162,896	1,200
Mojokerto City	20.21	120,196	132,424	142,272	7,040
Lamongan Regency	1,812.80	1,179,059	1,344,170	1,370,318	756
Gerbangkertosusila	6,421.25	9,115,485	9,924,509	10,177,027	1,585

Note: (a) The island of Bawean, while part of Gresik Regency, is not technically part of the Metropolitan area; nevertheless for convenience the figures given here include Bawean.

Reference: Statistics Indonesia

== Transportation ==
Surabaya metropolitan area has air connection via Juanda International Airport.

Surabaya metropolitan area has five commuter rail services with the network similar with KRL Commuterline in Jakarta metropolitan area. The services connects Surabaya city center to the neighboring cities and regency in the area.

The Suroboyo Bus city bus is serving Surabaya, using plastic waste as a form of payment. Ever since May 2022, however, direct payment using plastic bottles on the bus has been terminated and plastic waste has to be exchanged in designated points beforehand.

== See also ==
- List of metropolitan areas by population
- Jakarta metropolitan area
- Semarang metropolitan area
- Bandung metropolitan area
