= Core city =

Largest or most important city of a metropolitan area

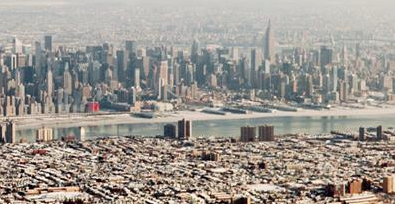
The skyline of Manhattan as seen from Hudson County, New Jersey in March 2014. New York City is the core city of New York metropolitan area.

In urban planning, a historic core city or central city is the municipality with the largest 1940 population in the present metropolitan area (metropolitan statistical area). This term was retired by the United States Census Bureau and replaced by the term principal city, which can include historic core cities and post-WWII cities. Metropolitan areas were no longer considered monocentric, but polycentric due to suburbanization of employment. A historic core city is not to be confused with the core of a metropolitan area which is defined as an urban area with a population of over 50,000 by the US census bureau.

Historic core cites in the United States often have higher detached single family housing rates, lower density, and fewer jobs than surrounding satellite cities and suburbs. A central city is usually the first settlement established in an urban region, years before the outlying districts came into existence. These cities typically contain less economic activity and more crime than their surrounding areas. Central cities often form the regional downtowns of metro areas. The term is used mainly in US context, although since the 1970s it has also become relatively common in Canada and, to a lesser extent, Europe and Australia.

== Examples ==
=== Metropolitan areas with one core city ===
The following are the core cities of the five largest metropolitan areas in the world.

Metropolitan area	Core city		Country	Metropolitan population
Metropolitan area	Name	Location	Country	Metropolitan population
Greater Tokyo Area (Kantō region)	Tokyo	35°41′23″N 139°41′32″E	Japan	37,274,000
Jakarta metropolitan area (Jabodetabekpunjur)	Jakarta	6°10′30″S 106°49′43″E	Indonesia	33,430,285
Central National Capital Region (Delhi Metropolitan Area)	Delhi	28°36′36″N 77°13′48″E	India	29,000,000
Seoul Capital Area (Sudogwon region)	Seoul	37°34′N 126°58′E	South Korea	25,514,000
Mumbai Metropolitan Region (मुंबई महानगर प्रदेश)	Mumbai, Maharashtra	18°58′30″N 72°49′33″E	India	24,400,000

=== Metropolitan areas with more than one core city ===
Metropolitan area	Core cities		Country	Metropolitan population
Metropolitan area	Name	Location	Country	Metropolitan population
Dallas–Fort Worth metroplex	Dallas	32°46′45″N 96°48′32″W	United States	7,470,158
Dallas–Fort Worth metroplex	Fort Worth	32°45′N 97°20′W	United States	7,470,158
Rhine-Ruhr metropolitan region	Essen	51°27′3″N 7°0′47″E	Germany	1,555,985
Rhine-Ruhr metropolitan region	Düsseldorf	51°14′N 6°47′E	Germany	1,555,985
Islamabad–Rawalpindi metropolitan area	Islamabad	33°41′35″N 73°03′50″E	Pakistan	4,500,000
Islamabad–Rawalpindi metropolitan area	Rawalpindi	33°36′N 73°02′E	Pakistan	4,500,000
Randstad	Amsterdam	52°22′22″N 04°53′37″E	Netherlands	8,403,915
Randstad	Rotterdam	51.92°N 4.48°E	Netherlands	8,403,915
Randstad	The Hague	52°04′48″N 04°18′36″E	Netherlands	8,403,915
Randstad	Utrecht	52°05′27″N 05°07′18″E	Netherlands	8,403,915

== See also ==
- Core countries – Industrialized/developed countries
- Satellite city
- Edge city
- Commuter town
