= List of Indonesian provinces by Human Development Index =

This is a list of Indonesian provinces by Human Development Index as of 2025. The data are regularly published every year by Statistics Indonesia. Below also contains list of cities and regencies that has classification of very high HDI as of 2025, as well as historical data of HDI of Indonesian provinces.

== Methodology ==
The figures come from the Indonesia Human Development Report, published by Statistics Indonesia and Human Development Index (by UN Method) of Indonesian provinces since 1990 (2021 revision).

Provinces of Indonesia by Human Development Index rankings for 2025 0.801 above 0.751 to 0.800 0.701 to 0.750 0.651 to 0.700 0.650 below

== By Statistics Indonesia in 2026 ==
Source published by Statistics Indonesia.

Rank		Province	HDI		Component			
2026	Change from 2025	Province	2026 score	Change from 2025	Life expectancy (years)	Years of schooling		Expenditure (thousand rupiah)
2026	Change from 2025	Province	2026 score	Change from 2025	Life expectancy (years)	Mean	Expected	Expenditure (thousand rupiah)
Very high human development
1	Steady	Jakarta	0.8588	▲0.008	76.44	11.76	14.00	21,431
2	Steady	Special Region of Yogyakarta	0.8343	▲0.009	75.83	10.46	15.98	16,437
3	Steady	Riau Islands	0.8112	▲0.006	75.69	10.84	13.32	16,372
4	Steady	East Kalimantan	0.8009	▲0.007	75.51	10.31	14.05	14,720
5	Steady	Bali	0.8003	▲0.007	75.68	9.95	13.64	15,853
High human development
6	Steady	West Sumatra	0.7797	▲0.007	74.93	10.03	14.32	12,364
7	Steady	Banten	0.7795	▲0.007	75.58	9.67	13.12	14,107
8	Steady	North Sumatra	0.7705	▲0.006	74.40	10.13	13.51	12,381
9	Steady	North Sulawesi	0.7699	▲0.007	74.66	10.00	13.03	12,959
10	Steady	Riau	0.7681	▲0.006	74.97	9.56	13.45	12,814
11	Steady	Aceh	0.7687	▲0.006	73.63	10.26	14.41	11,414
12	Steady	East Java	0.7684	▲0.007	75.57	8.43	13.45	14,304
13	Steady	South Kalimantan	0.7679	▲0.007	74.72	8.91	13.39	13,992
14	Steady	South Sulawesi	0.7666	▲0.007	74.37	9.19	13.57	13,288
15	Steady	West Java	0.7662	▲0.007	75.80	9.25	13.03	13,002
-	-	Indonesia (Statistics Indonesia)	0.7659	▲0.007	74.68	9.16	13.34	13,368
16	Steady	Bengkulu	0.7641	▲0.007	73.78	9.39	13.77	12,732
17	Steady	Bangka Belitung Islands	0.7600	▲0.007	74.71	8.82	12.59	14,272
18	Steady	Jambi	0.7587	▲0.008	74.62	9.18	13.35	12,432
19	Steady	Central Kalimantan	0.7545	▲0.006	74.20	9.13	12.81	12,949
20	Steady	Central Java	0.7531	▲0.005	75.50	8.16	13.06	13,281
21	Steady	South Sumatra	0.7528	▲0.005	74.77	8.92	12.66	12,935
22	Steady	Papua	0.7527	▲0.006	70.93	10.27	13.95	11,565
23	Steady	Southeast Sulawesi	0.7519	▲0.009	72.23	9.91	13.75	11,433
24	Steady	Maluku	0.7491	▲0.008	71.26	10.60	14.11	10,465
25	Steady	North Kalimantan	0.7481	▲0.008	73.79	9.53	13.58	10,917
26	Steady	Lampung	0.7474	▲0.008	74.93	8.70	12.80	12,327
27	Steady	West Nusa Tenggara	0.7473	▲0.008	72.81	8.51	14.00	12,268
28	Steady	Central Sulawesi	0.7369	▲0.009	71.29	9.39	13.36	11,390
29	Steady	Gorontalo	0.7347	▲0.009	71.28	8.51	13.28	12,527
30	Steady	North Maluku	0.7321	▲0.007	71.71	9.68	13.77	9,942
31	Steady	West Kalimantan	0.7295	▲0.009	74.50	8.16	12.95	11,089
32	Steady	West Sulawesi	0.7196	▲0.008	71.68	8.61	12.97	10,766
33	Steady	Southwest Papua	0.7128	▲0.007	70.48	9.03	13.90	9,282
34	Steady	East Nusa Tenggara	0.7054	▲0.006	72.41	8.35	13.35	9,038
35	Steady	South Papua	0.7011	▲0.006	68.93	8.65	12.92	10,194
Medium human development
36	Steady	West Papua	0.6930	▲0.008	68.94	8.38	13.22	9,436
37	Steady	Central Papua	0.6095	▲0.003	68.56	6.14	9.65	8,209
38	Steady	Highland Papua	0.5525	▲0.003	67.72	4.31	9.99	6,002

== Cities and regencies ==
A map showing Indonesian cities and regencies by Human Development Index, based on 2024 data Very High (≥ 0.800) High (0.700–0.799) Medium (0.600–0.699) Low (≤ 0.599)

=== List of cities of Indonesia with very high HDI (2026) ===
Rank		City	HDI		Component				Province
2026	Change from 2025	City	2026 score	Change from 2025	Life expectancy (years)	Years of schooling		Expenditure (thousand rupiah)	Province
2026	Change from 2025	City	2026 score	Change from 2025	Life expectancy (years)	Mean	Expected	Expenditure (thousand rupiah)	Province
Very high human development
1	▲1	Yogyakarta	0.9028	▲0.0075	76.28	12.02	17.47	19,920	Special Region of Yogyakarta
2	▼1	Banda Aceh	0.8990	▲0.0035	75.95	13.13	17.85	17,521	Aceh
3	Steady	South Jakarta	0.8892	▲0.0041	76.75	12.07	13.79	24,975	Jakarta
4	Steady	Kendari	0.8720	▲0.0084	75.98	12.91	16.93	15,116	Southeast Sulawesi
5	Steady	Salatiga	0.8668	▲0.0045	79.13	11.47	15.42	16,650	Central Java
6	Steady	Semarang	0.8648	▲0.0068	79.09	11.53	15.74	16,420	Central Java
7	▲1	Surabaya	0.8633	▲0.0068	76.56	11.04	15.10	18,977	East Java
8	▲1	Denpasar	0.8633	▲0.0070	76.38	11.90	14.18	20,128	Bali
9	▲1	Malang	0.8621	▲0.0066	76.13	11.29	15.94	17,222	East Java
10	▼3	Makassar	0.8615	▲0.0049	75.81	11.76	15.55	17,889	South Sulawesi
11	Steady	East Jakarta	0.8609	▲0.0058	76.14	12.23	13.77	18,712	Jakarta
12	▲1	Madiun	0.8576	▲0.0064	76.47	12.08	14.37	17,115	East Java
13	▼1	West Jakarta	0.8560	▲0.0042	76.39	11.51	13.24	21,709	Jakarta
14	▲1	Padang	0.8559	▲0.0066	75.88	11.69	16.34	15,089	West Sumatra
15	▲1	Pekanbaru	0.8545	▲0.0054	76.61	11.95	15.59	14,983	Riau
16	▲2	Bandung	0.8544	▲0.0078	76.64	11.31	14.22	18,202	West Java
17	▼3	Surakarta	0.8541	▲0.0049	78.48	11.44	14.84	15,870	Central Java
18	▲3	Central Jakarta	0.8540	▲0.0095	77.08	11.81	13.50	18,202	Jakarta
19	▼2	South Tangerang	0.8536	▲0.0055	76.28	12.11	14.49	16,225	Banten
20	▼1	Bengkulu	0.8535	▲0.0076	75.41	12.11	16.02	14,924	Bengkulu
21	▼1	Palu	0.8533	▲0.0080	74.48	12.09	16.04	15,501	Central Sulawesi
22	Steady	Bekasi	0.8495	▲0.0052	76.92	12.06	14.32	16,479	West Java
23	Steady	Depok	0.8487	▲0.0083	76.62	11.82	13.94	16,279	West Java
24	Steady	Ambon	0.8445	▲0.0048	73.82	12.24	15.63	14,692	Maluku
25	Steady	Batam	0.8427	▲0.0047	75.80	11.36	13.21	18,990	Riau Islands
26	Steady	Medan	0.8415	▲0.0041	75.81	11.79	14.63	15,674	North Sumatra
27	▲4	North Jakarta	0.8401	▲0.0089	75.46	11.30	12.95	19,617	Jakarta
28	▼1	Kupang	0.8400	▲0.0035	75.74	12.03	16.42	13,762	East Nusa Tenggara
29	▼1	Samarinda	0.8400	▲0.0047	76.14	11.10	15.01	15,610	East Kalimantan
30	Steady	Balikpapan	0.8395	▲0.0072	76.49	11.37	14.23	16,195	East Kalimantan
31	▲1	Bukittinggi	0.8378	▲0.0073	76.32	11.45	14.50	13,859	West Sumatra
32	▼3	Palembang	0.8367	▲0.0040	76.63	11.06	14.48	14,042	South Sumatra
33	▲3	Magelang	0.8364	▲0.0072	78.40	11.42	14.59	13,175	Central Java
34	▲4	Kediri	0.8361	▲0.0090	76.52	11.15	15.27	13,276	East Java
35	▼2	Bontang	0.8361	▲0.0057	75.60	11.12	13.25	17,659	East Kalimantan
36	▲1	Pontianak	0.8356	▲0.0076	75.07	10.70	15.29	15,632	West Kalimantan
37	▼2	Palangka Raya	0.8355	▲0.0057	76.27	11.68	15.11	14,727	Central Kalimantan
38	▼4	Ternate	0.8349	▲0.0049	73.59	12.33	15.64	14,042	North Maluku
39	▲4	Jambi	0.8308	▲0.0076	75.80	11.51	15.17	12,783	Jambi
40	▲1	Mataram	0.8306	▲0.0069	75.31	10.58	15.71	15,894	West Nusa Tenggara
41	▲1	Mojokerto	0.8296	▲0.0061	76.55	11.43	14.31	14,422	East Java
42	▼3	Tangerang	0.8290	▲0.0049	76.09	11.23	13.87	15,377	Banten
43	▼3	Manado	0.8283	▲0.0043	75.80	11.64	14.11	14,822	North Sulawesi
44	▲1	Banjarbaru	0.8280	▲0.0060	75.73	11.42	15.71	14,524	South Kalimantan
45	▲1	Blitar	0.8272	▲0.0069	75.74	10.98	14.47	14,548	East Java
46	▼2	Jayapura	0.8267	▲0.0041	72.55	11.91	15.49	15,272	Papua
47	▲5	Pangkal Pinang	0.8256	▲0.0092	75.96	10.60	13.24	16,734	Bangka Belitung Islands
48	▼1	Tanjung Pinang	0.8240	▲0.0038	75.51	10.68	14.05	16,213	Riau Islands
49	▲4	Payakumbuh	0.8227	▲0.0065	75.82	10.60	14.20	13,978	West Sumatra
50	▲1	Pematang Siantar	0.8225	▲0.0054	75.73	11.62	14.96	12,984	North Sumatra
51	▼1	Palopo	0.8222	▲0.0048	74.67	11.14	14.14	13,892	South Sulawesi
52	▲2	Parepare	0.8221	▲0.0071	75.11	11.02	14.15	14,495	South Sulawesi
53	▼5	Langsa	0.8216	▲0.0039	74.59	11.39	15.00	12,678	Aceh
54	▼5	Lhokseumawe	0.8215	▲0.0040	75.49	11.45	15.27	12,125	Aceh
55	Steady	Padang Panjang	0.8197	▲0.0065	75.09	-	-	-	West Sumatra
56	Steady	Bandar Lampung	0.8184	▲0.0058	75.49	-	-	-	Lampung
57	Steady	Metro	0.8182	▲0.0060	76.13	-	-	-	Lampung
58	▲1	Sorong	0.8167	▲0.0064	73.93	11.57	14.33	14,133	West Papua
59	▼1	Pariaman	0.8163	▲0.0036	74.83	-	-	-	West Sumatra
60	Steady	Cimahi	0.8153	▲0.0068	76.34	-	-	-	West Java
61	Steady	Solok	0.8142	▲0.0052	75.63	-	-	-	West Sumatra
62	Steady	Banjarmasin	0.8141	▲0.0053	75.63	-	-	-	South Kalimantan
63	Steady	Baubau	0.8121	▲0.0092	75.20	-	-	-	Southeast Sulawesi
64	Steady	Tomohon	0.8116	▲0.0051	76.31	-	-	-	North Sulawesi
65	Steady	Batu	0.8100	▲0.0065	75.95	-	-	-	East Java
66	New entry	Gorontalo	0.8094	▲0.0097	74.37	-	-	-	Gorontalo
67	New entry	Lubuk Linggau	0.8044	▲0.0050	75.80	-	-	-	South Sumatra
68	New entry	Bogor	0.8044	▲0.0069	76.56	-	-	-	West Java
69	▼3	Sabang	0.8036	▲0.0032	74.09	-	-	-	Aceh
70	New entry	Pasuruan	0.8030	▲0.0078	75.44	-	-	-	East Java
71	New entry	Bima	0.8028	▲0.0087	73.72	-	-	-	West Nusa Tenggara
72	New entry	Cilegon	0.8008	▲0.0054	75.72	-	-	-	Banten

=== List of regencies of Indonesia with very high HDI (2026) ===
Rank		Regency	HDI		Component				Province
2026	Change from 2025	Regency	2026 score	Change from 2025	Life expectancy (years)	Years of schooling		Expenditure (thousand rupiah)	Province
2026	Change from 2025	Regency	2026 score	Change from 2025	Life expectancy (years)	Mean	Expected	Expenditure (thousand rupiah)	Province
Very high human development
1	Steady	Sleman Regency	0.8714	▲0.0079	75.26	11.01	16.77	16,976	Special Region of Yogyakarta
2	Steady	Badung Regency	0.8472	▲0.0045	75.73	10.90	14.22	17,915	Bali
3	Steady	Sidoarjo Regency	0.8415	▲0.0080	75.36	10.78	14.97	15,311	East Java
4	Steady	Bantul Regency	0.8402	▲0.0099	74.64	9.79	15.61	16,524	Special Region of Yogyakarta
5	Steady	Gianyar Regency	0.8162	▲0.0066	-	-	-	-	Bali
6	New entry	Gresik Regency	0.8041	▲0.0072	-	-	-	-	East Java
7	New entry	Tabanan Regency	0.8023	▲0.0053	-	-	-	-	Bali
8	New entry	Minahasa Regency	0.8023	▲0.0050	-	-	-	-	North Sulawesi

== By UNDP reports ==
Rank	Province	Population 2020 Census	HDI sub-indicator 2023			HDI total 2023
Rank	Province	Population 2020 Census	(Health)	(Education)	(Income)	Total
1	Jakarta	10,562,088	0.809	0.746	0.800	0.785
2	Special Region of Yogyakarta	3,668,719	0.825	0.761	0.757	0.781
3	Bali	4,317,404	0.794	0.687	0.786	0.754
4	West Sumatra	5,534,472	0.806	0.720	0.734	0.752
5	East Kalimantan (Note: Includes North Kalimantan)	4,467,853	0.801	0.690	0.764	0.750
6	Riau (Note: Includes Riau Islands)	8,458,651	0.793	0.685	0.748	0.741
7	Bengkulu	2,010,670	0.806	0.679	0.738	0.740
8	North Sulawesi	2,621,923	0.758	0.723	0.741	0.740
9	North Sumatra	14,799,361	0.782	0.696	0.729	0.735
10	Aceh	5,274,871	0.783	0.702	0.717	0.733
11	West Java	48,274,160	0.794	0.650	0.756	0.731
12	Banten	11,904,562	0.769	0.656	0.768	0.729
-	Indonesia	270,200,000	0.787	0.660	0.743	0.728
13	Central Java	36,516,035	0.813	0.636	0.743	0.727
14	East Java	40,665,696	0.789	0.646	0.751	0.726
15	South Sulawesi (Note: Includes West Sulawesi)	10,492,738	0.784	0.660	0.728	0.722
16	Jambi	3,548,228	0.776	0.651	0.744	0.722
17	South Sumatra	8,600,765	0.787	0.647	0.729	0.720
18	Southeast Sulawesi	2,624,875	0.753	0.691	0.717	0.720
19	Lampung	9,007,848	0.787	0.638	0.736	0.718
20	Bangka Belitung Islands	1,517,590	0.741	0.638	0.770	0.714
21	Maluku (Note: Includes North Maluku)	3,131,860	0.730	0.721	0.693	0.714
22	South Kalimantan	4,073,584	0.767	0.651	0.726	0.713
23	West Nusa Tenggara	5,320,092	0.789	0.646	0.711	0.713
24	Central Sulawesi	2,985,734	0.757	0.671	0.701	0.709
25	Central Kalimantan	2,669,969	0.779	0.640	0.704	0.705
26	West Kalimantan	5,414,390	0.810	0.603	0.707	0.701
27	Gorontalo	1,171,681	0.720	0.636	0.705	0.686
28	East Nusa Tenggara	5,325,566	0.760	0.646	0.633	0.671
29	Papua (Note: Includes West Papua (province), Southwest Papua, South Papua, Central Papua, and Highland Papua)	5,437,775	0.685	0.665	0.663	0.671

== Trends by Statistics Indonesia ==
Province	HDI 2010	HDI 2011	HDI 2012	HDI 2013	HDI 2014	HDI 2015	HDI 2016	HDI 2017	HDI 2018	HDI 2019	HDI 2020	HDI 2021	HDI 2022	HDI 2023	HDI 2024
Sumatra Region
Aceh	0.6709	0.6745	0.6781	0.6830	0.6881	0.6945	0.7000	0.7060	0.7119	0.7190	0.7199	0.7218	0.7280	0.7340	0.7403
North Sumatra	0.6709	0.6734	0.6774	0.6836	0.6887	0.6951	0.7000	0.7057	0.7118	0.7174	0.7177	0.7200	0.7271	0.7337	0.7402
West Sumatra	0.6725	0.6781	0.6836	0.6891	0.6936	0.6998	0.7073	0.7124	0.7173	0.7239	0.7238	0.7265	0.7326	0.7375	0.7449
Riau	0.6865	0.6890	0.6915	0.6991	0.7033	0.7084	0.7120	0.7179	0.7244	0.7300	0.7271	0.7294	0.7352	0.7404	0.7479
Riau Islands	0.7113	0.7161	0.7236	0.7302	0.7340	0.7375	0.7399	0.7445	0.7484	0.7548	0.7559	0.7579	0.7646	0.7711	0.7797
Jambi	0.6539	0.6614	0.6694	0.6776	0.6824	0.6889	0.6962	0.6999	0.7065	0.7126	0.7129	0.7163	0.7214	0.7277	0.7343
Bengkulu	0.6535	0.6596	0.6661	0.6750	0.6806	0.6859	0.6933	0.6995	0.7064	0.7121	0.7140	0.7164	0.7216	0.7278	0.7339
South Sumatra	0.6444	0.6512	0.6579	0.6616	0.6675	0.6746	0.6824	0.6886	0.6939	0.7002	0.7001	0.7024	0.7090	0.7162	0.7230
Bangka Belitung Islands	0.6602	0.6659	0.6721	0.6792	0.6827	0.6905	0.6955	0.6999	0.7067	0.7130	0.7147	0.7169	0.7224	0.7285	0.7333
Lampung	0.6371	0.6420	0.6487	0.6573	0.6642	0.6695	0.6765	0.6825	0.6902	0.6957	0.6969	0.6990	0.7045	0.7115	0.7181
Java Region
Banten	0.6754	0.6822	0.6892	0.6947	0.6989	0.7027	0.7096	0.7142	0.7195	0.7244	0.7245	0.7272	0.7332	0.7387	0.7448
Jakarta	0.7631	0.7698	0.7753	0.7808	0.7839	0.7899	0.7960	0.8006	0.8047	0.8076	0.8077	0.8111	0.8165	0.8246	0.8308
West Java	0.6615	0.6667	0.6732	0.6825	0.6880	0.6950	0.7005	0.7069	0.7130	0.7203	0.7209	0.7245	0.7312	0.7374	0.7443
Central Java	0.6608	0.6664	0.6721	0.6802	0.6878	0.6949	0.6998	0.7052	0.7112	0.7173	0.7187	0.7216	0.7279	0.7339	0.7388
Special Region of Yogyakarta	0.7537	0.7593	0.7615	0.7644	0.7681	0.7759	0.7838	0.7889	0.7953	0.7999	0.7997	0.8022	0.8064	0.8107	0.8155
East Java	0.6536	0.6606	0.6674	0.6755	0.6814	0.6895	0.6974	0.7027	0.7077	0.7150	0.7171	0.7214	0.7275	0.7338	0.7409
Lesser Sunda Islands Region
Bali	0.7010	0.7087	0.7162	0.7209	0.7248	0.7327	0.7365	0.7430	0.7477	0.7538	0.7550	0.7569	0.7644	0.7710	0.7776
West Nusa Tenggara	0.6116	0.6214	0.6298	0.6376	0.6431	0.6519	0.6581	0.6658	0.6730	0.6814	0.6825	0.6865	0.6946	0.7020	0.7093
East Nusa Tenggara	0.5921	0.6024	0.6081	0.6168	0.6226	0.6267	0.6313	0.6373	0.6439	0.6523	0.6519	0.6528	0.6590	0.6668	0.6739
Kalimantan Region
West Kalimantan	0.6197	0.6235	0.6341	0.6430	0.6489	0.6559	0.6588	0.6626	0.6698	0.6765	0.6766	0.6790	0.6863	0.6941	0.7013
Central Kalimantan	0.6596	0.6638	0.6666	0.6741	0.6777	0.6853	0.6913	0.6979	0.7042	0.7091	0.7105	0.7125	0.7163	0.7220	0.7273
South Kalimantan	0.6520	0.6589	0.6668	0.6717	0.6763	0.6838	0.6905	0.6965	0.7017	0.7072	0.7091	0.7128	0.7184	0.7250	0.7303
East Kalimantan	0.7131	0.7202	0.7262	0.7321	0.7382	0.7417	0.7459	0.7512	0.7583	0.7661	0.7624	0.7688	0.7744	0.7820	0.7883
North Kalimantan	Part of East Kalimantan			0.6799	0.6864	0.6876	0.6920	0.6984	0.7056	0.7115	0.7063	0.7119	0.7183	0.7249	0.7302
Sulawesi Region
West Sulawesi	0.5974	0.6063	0.6101	0.6153	0.6224	0.6296	0.6360	0.6430	0.6510	0.6573	0.6611	0.6636	0.6692	0.6755	0.6820
South Sulawesi	0.6600	0.6665	0.6726	0.6792	0.6849	0.6915	0.6976	0.7034	0.7090	0.7166	0.7193	0.7224	0.7282	0.7346	0.7405
Southeast Sulawesi	0.6599	0.6652	0.6707	0.6755	0.6807	0.6875	0.6931	0.6986	0.7061	0.7120	0.7145	0.7166	0.7223	0.7279	0.7348
Central Sulawesi	0.6329	0.6427	0.6500	0.6579	0.6643	0.6676	0.6747	0.6811	0.6888	0.6950	0.6955	0.6979	0.7028	0.7095	0.7156
Gorontalo	0.6265	0.6348	0.6416	0.6470	0.6517	0.6586	0.6629	0.6701	0.6771	0.6849	0.6868	0.6900	0.6981	0.7045	0.7123
North Sulawesi	0.6783	0.6831	0.6904	0.6949	0.6996	0.7039	0.7105	0.7166	0.7220	0.7299	0.7293	0.7330	0.7381	0.7436	0.7503
Maluku Islands and Papua Region
North Maluku	0.6279	0.6319	0.6393	0.6478	0.6518	0.6591	0.6663	0.6720	0.6776	0.6870	0.6849	0.6876	0.6947	0.7021	0.7103
Maluku	0.6427	0.6475	0.6543	0.6609	0.6674	0.6705	0.6760	0.6819	0.6887	0.6945	0.6949	0.6971	0.7022	0.7094	0.7157
West Papua	0.5960	0.5990	0.6030	0.6091	0.6128	0.6173	0.6221	0.6299	0.6374	0.6470	0.6509	0.6526	0.6589	0.6616	0.6702
Southwest Papua	Part of West Papua												0.6759	0.6805	0.6863
Papua	0.5445	0.5501	0.5555	0.5625	0.5675	0.5725	0.5805	0.5909	0.6006	0.6084	0.6044	0.6062	0.7176	0.7241	0.7300
South Papua	Part of Papua												0.6574	0.6727	0.6790
Central Papua	Part of Papua												0.5825	0.5893	0.5975
Highland Papua	Part of Papua												0.5170	0.5245	0.5342
Overall
Indonesia	0.6653	0.6709	0.6770	0.6831	0.6890	0.6955	0.7018	0.7081	0.7139	0.7192	0.7194	0.7229	0.7291	0.7355	0.7420

== Trends by UNDP reports ==
Province	HDI 1990	HDI 1995	HDI 2000	HDI 2005	HDI 2010	HDI 2015	HDI 2020
Sumatra Region
Aceh	0.519	0.557	0.607	0.642	0.674	0.700	0.716
North Sumatra	0.558	0.598	0.638	0.655	0.677	0.702	0.718
West Sumatra	0.531	0.569	0.623	0.645	0.681	0.720	0.735
Riau (Note: Includes Riau Islands)	0.527	0.564	0.617	0.659	0.697	0.715	0.724
Jambi	0.512	0.549	0.600	0.635	0.662	0.689	0.705
Bengkulu	0.502	0.537	0.589	0.625	0.667	0.705	0.723
South Sumatra	0.533	0.571	0.608	0.624	0.660	0.691	0.704
Bangka Belitung Islands	0.557	0.596	0.625	0.640	0.675	0.691	0.698
Lampung	0.509	0.544	0.577	0.604	0.648	0.684	0.701
Java Region
Banten	0.559	0.599	0.631	0.634	0.666	0.699	0.712
Jakarta	0.633	0.678	0.722	0.734	0.747	0.757	0.766
West Java	0.509	0.545	0.593	0.632	0.672	0.700	0.714
Central Java	0.524	0.558	0.592	0.620	0.658	0.692	0.711
Special Region of Yogyakarta	0.598	0.637	0.675	0.699	0.724	0.747	0.763
East Java	0.521	0.555	0.598	0.622	0.657	0.693	0.710
Lesser Sunda Islands Region
Bali	0.558	0.595	0.657	0.686	0.699	0.724	0.738
West Nusa Tenggara	0.446	0.471	0.505	0.561	0.619	0.667	0.697
East Nusa Tenggara	0.481	0.516	0.540	0.558	0.606	0.640	0.655
Kalimantan Region
West Kalimantan	0.513	0.547	0.579	0.598	0.638	0.670	0.685
Central Kalimantan	0.507	0.545	0.597	0.636	0.657	0.674	0.689
South Kalimantan	0.526	0.563	0.594	0.615	0.655	0.682	0.696
East Kalimantan (Note: Includes North Kalimantan)	0.572	0.613	0.660	0.684	0.709	0.724	0.733
Sulawesi Region
South Sulawesi (Note: Includes West Sulawesi)	0.512	0.547	0.596	0.623	0.656	0.691	0.706
Central Sulawesi	0.489	0.526	0.579	0.612	0.629	0.667	0.692
Southeast Sulawesi	0.510	0.547	0.575	0.606	0.656	0.686	0.703
Gorontalo	0.482	0.520	0.550	0.575	0.612	0.647	0.670
North Sulawesi	0.537	0.577	0.639	0.673	0.692	0.712	0.723
Maluku Islands and Papua Region
Maluku (Note: Includes North Maluku)	0.547	0.587	0.621	0.626	0.650	0.681	0.697
Papua (Note: Includes West Papua (province))	0.521	0.559	0.589	0.591	0.586	0.622	0.655
Overall
Indonesia	0.524	0.560	0.603	0.631	0.665	0.696	0.712

== See also ==
- Economy of Indonesia
- List of Indonesian provinces by GDP
- List of Indonesian provinces by GDP per capita
- List of Indonesian provinces by poverty rate
- List of Indonesian cities by GDP
- List of Indonesian regencies by GDP
