= List of Indonesian provinces by GDP per capita =

This article presents a list of Indonesian provinces sorted by their gross regional product nominal (GRP Nominal) per capita.

== Methodology ==
GRP Nominal is the regional or provincial counterpart of the national gross domestic product, the most comprehensive measure of national economic activity. The Statistics Indonesia (Badan Pusat Statistik) derives GRP for a province as the sum of the GRP Nominal originating in all the industries in the province at current prices market.

List of Indonesian administrative divisions by GRP Nominal, with 14,140 IDR = US$1 term of Nominal while 4,875.86 IDR = Int$1 term of PPP.

GRP are the amount of remuneration received by factors of production participating in the production process in a region within a certain period of time (usually one year). With component
1. Household Consumption Expenditures
2. Consumption Expenditures of Non-Profit Institutions Serving Households (NPISHs)
3. Government Consumption Expenditures (GCE)
4. Gross Fixed Capital Formation (GFCF)
5. Changes in Inventories
6. Net Exports (Exports minus Imports)

This clickable map shows province of Indonesia as of 30 June 2022. Click on a province name to go to its main article.

== List ==
Jakarta GDP share by sector (2022)
1. Agriculture (0.08%)
2. Manufacturing (12.3%)
3. Other Industrial (11.7%)
4. Service (75.9%)
East Java GDP share by sector (2022)
1. Agriculture (11.1%)
2. Manufacturing (30.6%)
3. Other Industrial (13.8%)
4. Service (44.5%)
West Java GDP share by sector (2022)
1. Agriculture (8.57%)
2. Manufacturing (42.2%)
3. Other Industrial (10.1%)
4. Service (39.1%)
Central Java GDP share by sector (2022)
1. Agriculture (13.5%)
2. Manufacturing (33.9%)
3. Other Industrial (13.6%)
4. Service (38.9%)
Riau GDP share by sector (2022)
1. Agriculture (24.7%)
2. Manufacturing (27.4%)
3. Other Industrial (8.66%)
4. Mining and Quarrying (23.4%)
5. Service (15.9%)

=== 2025 Data ===
List of Indonesian provinces by GDP Per Capita in 2025. Average annual exchange rate in 2024: IDR 15,864.1923 per U.S. dollar.
| Rank | Province | Region | Per capita (in thousand Rp) | Per capita | |
| Rank | Province | Region | Per capita (in thousand Rp) | Nominal ($) | PPP (Int$) |
|---|---|---|---|---|---|
| 1 | Jakarta | Java | 367,687 | 22,317 | 77,669 |
| 2 | East Kalimantan | Kalimantan | 208,331 | 12,647 | 44,013 |
| 3 | North Kalimantan | Kalimantan | 208,210 | 12,643 | 44,004 |
| 4 | Riau | Sumatra | 176,385 | 10,716 | 37,260 |
| 5 | Riau Islands | Sumatra | 172,459 | 10,469 | 36,437 |
| 6 | West Papua | Western New Guinea | 139,213 | 8,459 | 29,739 |
| 7 | Central Sulawesi | Sulawesi | 131,643 | 7,990 | 27,808 |
| 8 | Central Papua | Western New Guinea | 107,566 | 6,530 | 22,762 |
| - | Kalimantan | Indonesia | 103,339 | 6,514 | 21,765 |
| 9 | North Maluku | Maluku Islands | 97,262 | 5,907 | 20,557 |
| 10 | Jambi | Sumatra | 92,786 | 5,632 | 19,602 |
| 11 | Central Kalimantan | Kalimantan | 84,730 | 5,143 | 17,898 |
| 12 | Papua | Western New Guinea | 84,305 | 5,120 | 17,819 |
| - | Java Island | Indonesia | 80,011 | 5,044 | 16,852 |
| - | Sumatra Island | Indonesia | 79,171 | 4,991 | 16,675 |
| - | Indonesia | South East Asia | 78,617 | 4,956 | 16,558 |
| 13 | East Java | Java | 80,856 | 4,907 | 17,079 |
| 14 | South Sumatra | Sumatra | 80,663 | 4,896 | 17,040 |
| 15 | South Sulawesi | Sulawesi | 78,748 | 4,779 | 16,634 |
| 16 | North Sumatra | Sumatra | 78,310 | 4,753 | 16,542 |
| - | Western New Guinea | Indonesia | 75,502 | 4,759 | 15,902 |
| - | Sulawesi Island | Indonesia | 75,384 | 4,752 | 15,877 |
| 17 | Bangka Belitung Islands | Sumatra | 75,323 | 4,574 | 15,919 |
| 18 | North Sulawesi | Sulawesi | 75,235 | 4,567 | 15,894 |
| 19 | Banten | Java | 74,673 | 4,532 | 15,774 |
| 20 | Bali | Lesser Sunda Islands | 72,658 | 4,410 | 15,349 |
| 21 | Southeast Sulawesi | Sulawesi | 72,031 | 4,375 | 15,227 |
| 22 | South Kalimantan | Kalimantan | 70,577 | 4,284 | 14,909 |
| 23 | South Papua | Western New Guinea | 64,928 | 3,945 | 13,732 |
| 24 | Southwest Papua | Western New Guinea | 61,624 | 3,743 | 13,026 |
| 25 | West Java | Java | 59,865 | 3,633 | 12,645 |
| 26 | West Sumatra | Sumatra | 59,549 | 3,614 | 12,579 |
| 27 | West Kalimantan | Kalimantan | 56,984 | 3,458 | 12,037 |
| 28 | Special Region of Yogyakarta | Java | 55,039 | 3,341 | 11,628 |
| 29 | Lampung | Sumatra | 55,009 | 3,339 | 11,621 |
| 30 | Bengkulu | Sumatra | 52,305 | 3,174 | 11,049 |
| 31 | Central Java | Java | 50,824 | 3,084 | 10,636 |
| - | Maluku Islands | Indonesia | 47,992 | 3,025 | 10,108 |
| 32 | Gorontalo | Sulawesi | 47,477 | 2,882 | 10,030 |
| 33 | West Sulawesi | Sulawesi | 46,654 | 2,832 | 9,857 |
| 34 | Aceh | Sumatra | 45,770 | 2,778 | 9,668 |
| - | Lesser Sunda Islands | Indonesia | 39,274 | 2,476 | 8,272 |
| 35 | West Nusa Tenggara | Lesser Sunda Islands | 33,667 | 2,043 | 7,221 |
| 36 | Maluku | Maluku Islands | 33,652 | 2,043 | 7,110 |
| 37 | East Nusa Tenggara | Lesser Sunda Islands | 25,837 | 1,568 | 5,458 |
| 38 | Highland Papua | Western New Guinea | 19,111 | 1,161 | 4,039 |

== See also ==
- Economy of Indonesia
- List of Indonesian provinces by GDP
- List of Indonesian provinces by Human Development Index
- List of Indonesian provinces by poverty rate
- List of Indonesian cities by GDP
- List of Indonesian regencies by GDP
- List of ASEAN country subdivisions by GDP
