= Poverty in Indonesia =

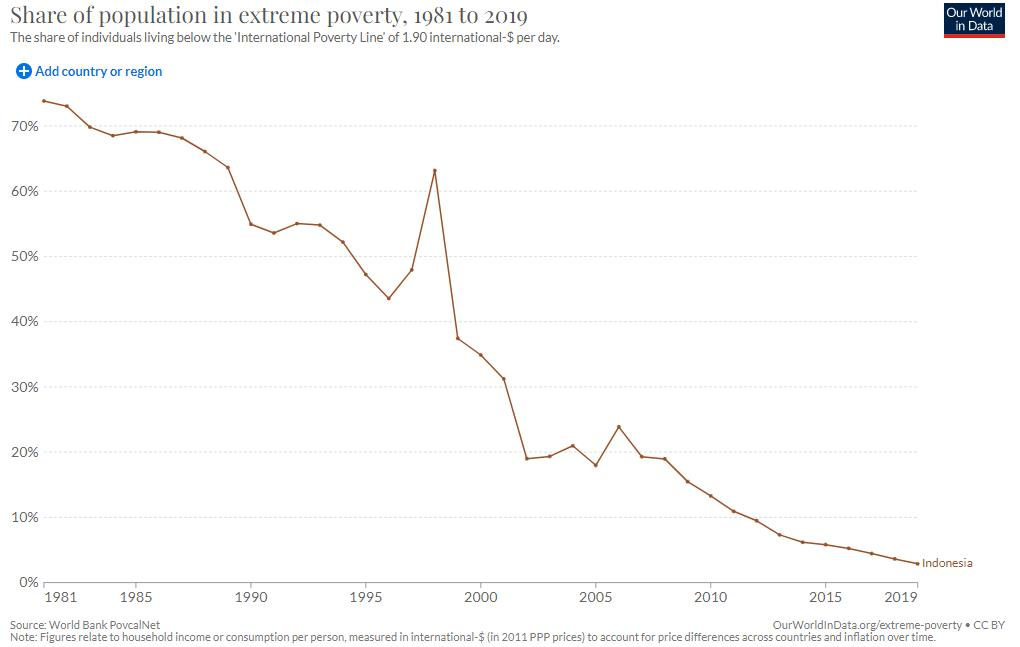
Share of population in extreme poverty

Poverty in Indonesia is a widespread issue though in recent years the official numbers show a declining trend. Due to the dense rural nature of parts of the Java, Bali, Lombok, and parts of Sumatra, poverty can be classified into rural and urban poverty. Urban poverty is prevalent in not only in Jabodetabek, but also in Medan and Surabaya.

As a sprawling archipelago, poverty characteristics and implications vary widely from island to island and culture to culture. The Indonesian part of New Guinea (comprising the provinces of Papua and West Papua) has serious poverty issues of its own due to economic, cultural, linguistic and physical isolations which set it apart from the rest of Indonesia.

== Figures ==
In February 1999, as much as 47.97 million people were classified as poor, representing around 23% of the nation's population. However, this figure must take into account the slide of the rupiah in the Asian financial crisis. By July 2005, that number had been reduced to 35.10 million, representing 41.97% of the total population. Figures from March 2007 showed that 37.17 million people were under the poverty line, representing 20.58% of the entire population.

Based on a report from the Asian Development Bank, Indonesia's national population in 2015 was at 255.46 million, 47.2% of whom lived below the national poverty line. Indonesia's national poverty line set a consumption of Rp302,735 ($25) monthly per person - about 82 cents daily. There was also a disparity as early as 2014, where 23.8% of the rural population was classified as poor while the urban population consisted of 16.2%. This stems from the low-productivity jobs available in the country in agriculture and low-end service sectors.

In September 2017, Indonesia's poverty rate stood at 10.12%, with some 26.58 million people living below the poverty line. As of September 2018, the poverty rate stood at 9.66% (some 25 million people), the lowest ever recorded. With the COVID-19 pandemic causing an economic downturn, Statistics Indonesia reported 1.63 million Indonesian fell into poverty in March 2020, raising the total poverty number to 26.42 million people. The government expected the poverty rate to reach 10.60% (28 million) by the end of the year as the pandemic continued to take its toll on the poor across Indonesia.

In 2024, Indonesia's Finance Minister, Sri Mulyani Indrawati, reported a significant decline in the national poverty rate. The poverty rate decreased from 9.36% in 2023 to 9.03% in 2024, while extreme poverty fell from 1.12% to 0.83% during the same period. Additionally, income inequality, measured by the Gini ratio, improved from 0.388 in 2023 to 0.379 in 2024.

== Poverty and religion ==
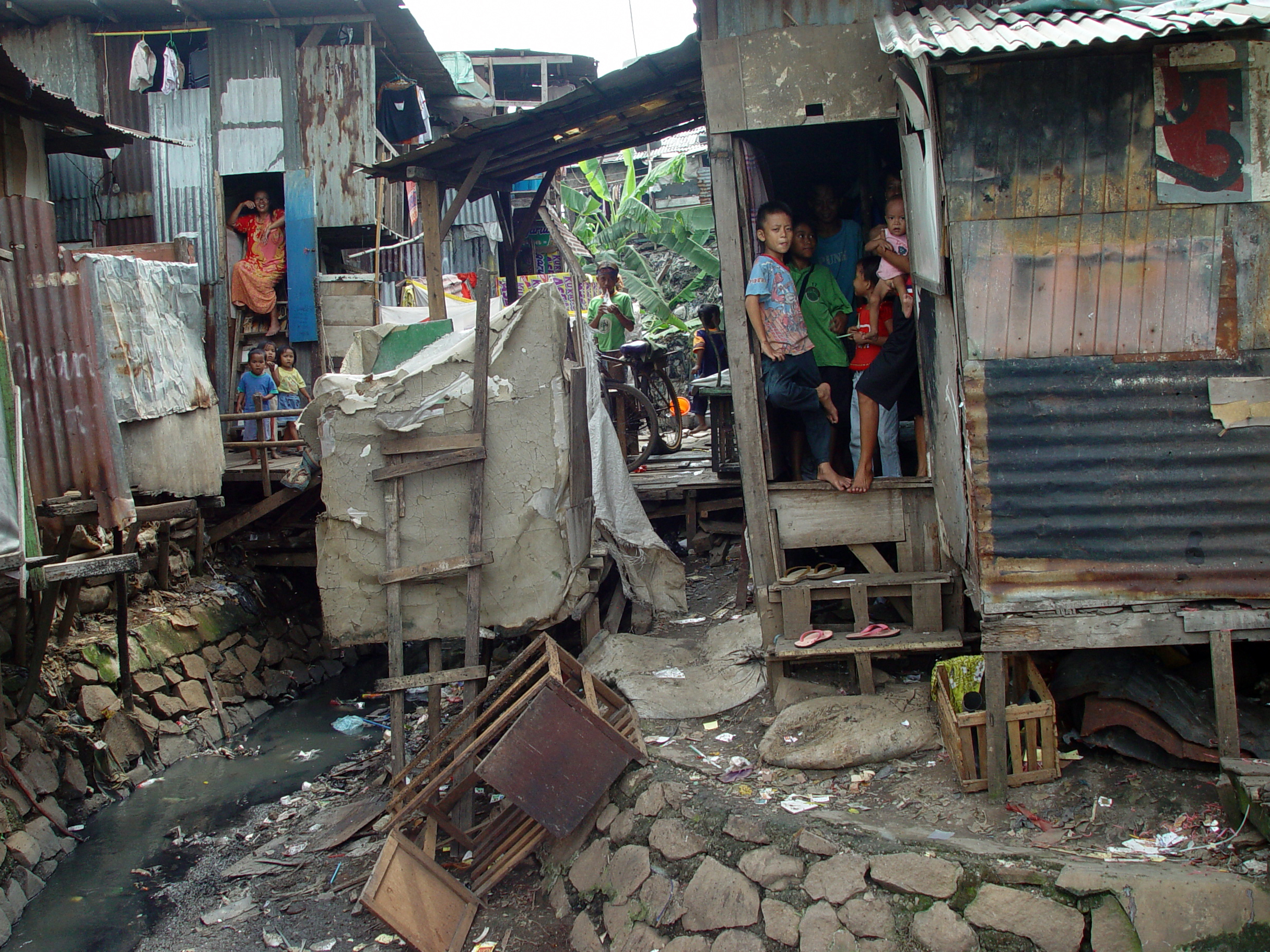
Life in a slum in Jakarta, 2013

Indonesia has the world's largest Muslim population, which is approximately 227 million people, more than Pakistan and India, at 204 million and 189 million people, respectively. The Indonesian government began to address the issue of poverty in 1994 due to the migration of rural residents into urban areas hoping for better opportunities in the 1970s and 1980s. This existing social inequality then made Muslim economists design a more modern way of collecting alms run by private organizations in accordance with Islamic values. In Islam, zakat is a form of giving where a muslim or business entity gives gold, silver, property and more to those who deserve, in accordance to Islamic Law. Zakat is one of the obligations of Muslims who are able to do it and have the potential to reduce poverty and social inequality. Other than private foundations who collect and distribute zakat, Indonesia has also established the National Amil Zakat Agency (BAZNAS) as an organization that collects and distributes zakat nationally in response to the large zakat potential of this country with the largest number of Muslims in the world. Nevertheless, a study by Khasandy and Badrudin in 2019 argued that BAZNAS could only manage 1% of the potential estimated zakat which was Rp217 trillion. In 1999, the Indonesian government issued a law on zakat management, which stated that zakat as a potential source of funds to support welfare for public needs to be managed professionally and responsibly by the community (private foundations) and the government. Therefore, the government has an obligation to provide protection, guidance and services to zakat givers and recipients and zakat managers. Until now, various poverty alleviation programs have been implemented the government, among others, Family Welfare Savings (Takesra) and Family Welfare Business Credit (Kukesra) in the Suharto era (1970-1998), Labor Intensive Program in the B. J. Habibie era (1998-1999), Health and Education Services for the Poor in the Abdurrahman Wahid era (1999-2001), Cheap Electricity for Poor Households in the Megawati Sukarnoputri era (2001-2014), Cash Transfer Program (BLT) in the Susilo Bambang Yudhoyono era (2004-2014) and Non-Cash Food Assistance (BPNT) in the Joko Widodo era (2014-2019).

Faith-based organizations (FBO), like BAZNAS, could be a potential way in alleviating poverty in Indonesia. The existence of the FBOs play an important role in providing welfare services, but do not always have a good impact on certain community groups. Welfare service programs such as education and health are also carried out by Protestants and Catholics who are religious minorities in Indonesia. However, these programs are often not carried out on a massive scale because of the reluctance to be misinterpreted as an attempt to convert non-Christians to Christianity. The lack of cooperation between the government and the FBO is also one of the factors in the overlapping program between the FBO and the government. In addition, the existence of anti-Christian tensions in Indonesia also makes it increasingly difficult to establish cooperation between interfaith FBOs in alleviating poverty.

== See also ==
- List of Indonesian provinces by poverty rate
