= List of Indonesian provinces by poverty rate =

This is a list of Indonesian provinces by poverty rate as of 2022. The international poverty rate used by the World Bank is used in the following list. The estimates can therefore differ from other estimates, like the national poverty rate. The national poverty rate was estimated to be 9.5% in 2022.

== List ==
Percent of population living on less than $2.15, $3.65 and $6.85 a day, international dollars (2017 PPP) as per the World Bank.

Percent of population living on less than poverty thresholds
Province	$2.15	$3.65	$6.85	daily income per capita (2017 PPP $ mean)	Gini coefficient	Year of estimate
Indonesia	2.5%	20.2%	60.4%	7.81	0.380	2022
Gorontalo	9.3%	36.2%	68.2%	6.76	0.413	2022
West Sulawesi	7.7%	39.9%	74.3%	5.77	0.359	2022
East Nusa Tenggara	7.3%	38.9%	79.4%	5.30	0.327	2022
Southeast Sulawesi	7.0%	32.1%	67.5%	6.62	0.382	2022
South Sulawesi	5.8%	29.4%	66.5%	6.76	0.372	2022
West Nusa Tenggara	4.9%	24.3%	67.0%	6.87	0.370	2022
Central Java	4.2%	29.4%	69.5%	6.62	0.371	2022
Papua (Note: Includes Papua, South Papua, Central Papua, and Highland Papua (province))	3.8%	24.8%	51.4%	8.72	0.403	2022
North Sulawesi	3.4%	24.7%	61.4%	7.30	0.362	2022
West Java	3.0%	22.3%	59.0%	8.33	0.414	2022
East Java	2.8%	26.2%	68.1%	6.86	0.367	2022
South Sumatra	2.3%	23.3%	63.4%	6.85	0.335	2022
Special Region of Yogyakarta	2.1%	21.1%	61.4%	8.58	0.435	2022
Central Sulawesi	2.0%	20.1%	68.3%	6.49	0.303	2022
West Papua (Note: Includes West Papua and Southwest Papua (province))	1.8%	17.5%	50.4%	8.62	0.368	2022
Lampung	1.4%	20.1%	70.4%	6.43	0.310	2022
Maluku	0.9%	13.8%	65.7%	6.93	0.293	2022
Aceh	0.8%	15.7%	62.2%	7.05	0.307	2022
West Kalimantan	0.7%	13.6%	59.4%	7.34	0.308	2022
North Sumatra	0.7%	12.7%	64.4%	7.16	0.308	2022
Central Kalimantan	0.7%	8.4%	47.8%	8.60	0.317	2022
Bengkulu	0.6%	14.8%	62.3%	7.15	0.310	2022
Bali	0.6%	14.5%	53.0%	8.40	0.359	2022
Banten	0.6%	9.1%	46.9%	9.40	0.359	2022
North Maluku	0.5%	13.4%	63.8%	6.77	0.273	2022
Jambi	0.5%	12.6%	58.2%	7.55	0.317	2022
South Kalimantan	0.1%	7.4%	50.8%	8.32	0.312	2022
Riau Islands	0.1%	7.2%	51.0%	8.48	0.322	2022
West Sumatra	0.1%	6.0%	55.7%	7.94	0.295	2022
Riau	0.1%	4.7%	36.9%	10.55	0.339	2022
North Kalimantan/East Kalimantan	0.0%	2.6%	33.5%	10.28	0.316	2022
Jakarta	0.0%	2.3%	27.9%	14.47	0.423	2022
Bangka Belitung Islands	0.0%	0.7%	25.6%	9.75	0.232	2022

== See also ==
- List of Indonesian provinces by GDP
- List of Indonesian cities by GDP
- List of Indonesian regencies by GDP
