= List of Indonesian provinces by GDP =

This article presents a list of Indonesian provinces sorted by their gross regional product (GRP Nominal and PPP).

== Methodology ==
GRP Nominal is the regional or provincial counterpart of the national gross domestic product, the most comprehensive measure of national economic activity. The Statistics Indonesia (Badan Pusat Statistik) derives GRP for a province as the sum of the GRP Nominal originating in all the industries in the province at current prices market.

GRP are the amount of remuneration received by factors of production participating in the production process in a region within a certain period of time (usually one year). With component
1. Household Consumption Expenditures
2. Consumption Expenditures of Non-Profit Institutions Serving Households (NPISHs)
3. Government Consumption Expenditures (GCE)
4. Gross Fixed Capital Formation (GFCF)
5. Changes in Inventories
6. Net Exports (Exports minus Imports)

This clickable map shows province of Indonesia as of 25 October 2012. Click on a province name to go to its main article.

Provinces of Indonesia by nominal Gross regional product in 2019 (billion US$) 200.01 above 100.01 to 200.00 50.01 to 100.00 10.01 to 50.00 0.00 to 10.00

Provinces of Indonesia by Gross regional product PPP in 2019 (billion Int$) 500.01 above 250.01 to 500.00 100.01 to 250.00 50.01 to 100.00 0.00 to 50.00

== List ==
=== 2025 data ===
List of Indonesian provinces by GDP in 2025 (in billions). Average annual exchange rate in 2025 : IDR 16,475 per U.S. dollar. Average annual exchange rate in 2025 (PPP) : IDR 4,734 per International dollar.
Rank	Province	Region	GDP (in billion Rp)	GDP Nominal (in billion $)	GDP PPP (in billion $)
-	Indonesia	South East Asia	23,821,104	1,445.894	5,031.919
-	Java Island	Indonesia	13,455,514	816.723	2,842.314
-	Sumatra Island	Indonesia	5,251,355	318.747	1,109.285
1	Jakarta	Java	3,926,153	238.310	829.352
2	East Java	Java	3,403,167	206.566	718.878
3	West Java	Java	3,038,668	184.441	641.882
4	Central Java	Java	1,943,188	117.948	410.475
-	Kalimantan	Indonesia	1,919,852	116.531	405.545
-	Sulawesi Island	Indonesia	1,707,775	103.659	360.747
5	North Sumatra	Sumatra	1,236,194	75.035	261.131
6	Riau	Sumatra	1,201,384	72.922	253.778
7	Banten	Java	936,204	56.826	197.762
8	East Kalimantan	Kalimantan	889,073	53.965	187.806
9	South Sulawesi	Sulawesi	753,077	45.710	159.078
10	South Sumatra	Sumatra	720,205	43.715	152.135
-	Lesser Sunda Islands	Indonesia	665,474	40.393	140.573
11	Lampung	Sumatra	523,847	31.796	110.656
-	Western New Guinea	Indonesia	436,126	26.472	92.126
12	Central Sulawesi	Sulawesi	415,477	25.219	87.764
13	Riau Islands	Sumatra	381,730	23.170	80.636
14	West Sumatra	Sumatra	352,189	21.377	74.396
15	Jambi	Sumatra	349,663	21.224	73.862
16	West Kalimantan	Kalimantan	328,570	19.944	69.406
17	Bali	Lesser Sunda Islands	324,149	19.675	68.473
18	South Kalimantan	Kalimantan	305,127	18.521	64.454
19	Aceh	Sumatra	257,502	15.630	54.394
20	Central Kalimantan	Kalimantan	241,056	14.632	50.920
21	Special Region of Yogyakarta	Java	208,134	12.633	43.966
22	North Sulawesi	Sulawesi	204,747	12.428	43.250
23	Southeast Sulawesi	Sulawesi	204,334	12.409	43.184
-	Maluku Islands	Indonesia	199,933	12.136	42.233
24	West Nusa Tenggara	Lesser Sunda Islands	192,952	11.712	40.759
25	Central Papua	Western New Guinea	160,519	9.743	33.908
26	North Kalimantan	Kalimantan	156,026	9.470	32.959
27	East Nusa Tenggara	Lesser Sunda Islands	148,373	9.006	31.342
28	North Maluku	Maluku Islands	133,620	8.111	28.226
29	Bangka Belitung Islands	Sumatra	116,812	7.090	24.675
30	Bengkulu	Sumatra	111,829	6.788	23.623
31	Papua	Western New Guinea	90,513	5.494	19.120
32	West Papua	Western New Guinea	81,808	4.966	17.281
33	West Sulawesi	Sulawesi	71,162	4.319	15.032
34	Maluku	Maluku Islands	66,313	4.025	14.008
35	Gorontalo	Sulawesi	58,978	3.580	12.458
36	Southwest Papua	Western New Guinea	39,220	2.381	8.285
37	South Papua	Western New Guinea	35,688	2.166	7.539
38	Highland Papua	Western New Guinea	28,378	1.723	5.995

Indonesian provinces by GDP
Jakarta GDP share by sector (2022): 1. Agriculture (0.08%); 2. Manufacturing (12.3%); 3. Other Industrial (11.7%); 4. Service (75.9%)	East Java GDP share by sector (2022): 1. Agriculture (11.1%); 2. Manufacturing (30.6%); 3. Other Industrial (13.8%); 4. Service (44.5%)	West Java GDP share by sector (2022): 1. Agriculture (8.57%); 2. Manufacturing (42.2%); 3. Other Industrial (10.1%); 4. Service (39.1%)	Central Java GDP share by sector (2022): 1. Agriculture (13.5%); 2. Manufacturing (33.9%); 3. Other Industrial (13.6%); 4. Service (38.9%)

Indonesian provinces by GDP
Riau GDP share by sector (2022): 1. Agriculture (24.7%); 2. Manufacturing (27.4%); 3. Other Industrial (8.66%); 4. Mining and Quarrying (23.4%); 5. Service (15.9%)	North Sumatra GDP share by sector (2022): 1. Agriculture (20.9%); 2. Manufacturing (20.0%); 3. Other Industrial (15.4%); 4. Service (43.7%)	East Kalimantan GDP share by sector (2022): 1. Agriculture (7.04%); 2. Manufacturing (15.1%); 3. Other Industrial (7.79%); 4. Mining and Quarrying (53.2%); 5. Service (16.9%)	Banten GDP share by sector (2022): 1. Agriculture (5.09%); 2. Manufacturing (30.5%); 3. Other Industrial (14.6%); 4. Service (49.9%)

Indonesian provinces by GDP
South Sulawesi GDP share by sector (2022): 1. Agriculture (22.1%); 2. Manufacturing (12.9%); 3. Other Industrial (19.3%); 4. Service (45.7%)	South Sumatra GDP share by sector (2022): 1. Agriculture (13.2%); 2. Manufacturing (17.5%); 3. Other Industrial (10.9%); 4. Mining and Quarrying (27.6%); 5. Service (30.8%)	Lampung GDP share by sector (2022): 1. Agriculture (27.9%); 2. Manufacturing (18.6%); 3. Other Industrial (15.9%); 4. Service (37.7%)	Central Sulawesi GDP share by sector (2022): 1. Agriculture (15.8%); 2. Manufacturing (40.3%); 3. Other Industrial (8.56%); 4. Mining and Quarrying (15.4%); 5. Service (20.0%)

== List of province by past GDP (nominal) ==
=== BPS estimates between 2010 and 2019 ===
BPS estimates between 2010 and 2015 in billion Rp
Province	2010	2011	2012	2013	2014	2015	2016	2017	2018	2019
Indonesia	6,864,133.13	7,825,075.53	8,672,954.41	9,612,506.50	10,699,877.63	11,526,332.80	12,401,728.50	13,589,825.70	14,838,756.00	15,832,657.20
Aceh	101,545.24	108,217.63	114,552.08	121,331.13	127,897.07	129,092.66	136,843.82	145,806.92	155,910.98	164,162.98
North Sumatra	331,085.24	377,037.10	417,120.44	469,464.02	521,954.95	571,722.01	626,062.91	684,634.43	741,347.43	799,608.95
West Sumatra	105,017.74	118,674.29	131,435.65	146,899.83	164,944.26	179,951.98	196,099.18	213,893.47	230,367.22	245,949.74
Riau	388,578.23	485,649.34	558,492.72	607,498.45	679,395.86	652,761.63	681,699.03	704,705.03	752,263.07	760,247.51
Jambi	90,618.41	103,522.91	115,070.40	129,976.04	144,814.42	155,065.66	171,199.47	189,787.72	207,878.69	216,927.71
South Sumatra	194,012.97	226,666.93	253,265.12	280,348.46	306,421.60	331,765.70	353,866.96	382,885.70	419,392.16	453,402.71
Bengkulu	28,352.57	32,199.71	36,207.68	40,565.49	45,389.90	50,334.02	55,384.17	60,657.68	66,402.99	72,098.24
Lampung	150,560.84	170,046.79	187,348.82	204,402.64	230,794.45	252,883.10	279,417.62	306,700.43	332,446.07	356,676.83
Bangka Belitung Islands	35,561.90	40,849.04	45,400.23	50,388.36	56,373.62	60,987.32	65,048.23	69,865.21	73,113.28	75,794.96
Riau Islands	111,223.67	126,914.20	144,840.79	163,261.57	180,879.98	199,570.39	216,007.66	227,706.88	248,822.23	267,631.48
Jakarta	1,075,183.48	1,224,218.48	1,369,432.64	1,546,876.49	1,762,316.40	1,989,088.75	2,159,073.60	2,365,353.85	2,592,606.57	2,815,636.16
West Java	906,685.76	1,021,628.60	1,128,245.68	1,258,989.33	1,385,825.08	1,524,974.83	1,653,238.40	1,788,117.36	1,960,627.65	2,123,153.71
Central Java	623,224.62	623,224.62	754,529.44	830,016.02	922,471.18	1,010,986.64	1,087,316.70	1,172,794.52	1,268,261.17	1,360,960.13
Special Region of Yogyakarta	64,678.97	71,369.96	77,247.86	84,924.54	92,842.48	101,440.52	109,962.35	119,128.72	129,818.36	141,047.69
East Java	990,648.84	1,120,577.16	1,248,767.29	1,382,501.50	1,537,947.63	1,691,477.06	1,855,738.40	2,012,917.99	2,188,766.35	2,345,548.55
Banten	271,465.28	306,174.29	338,224.93	377,836.08	428,740.07	479,300.44	517,898.34	563,597.70	613,804.41	661,321.34
Bali	93,749.35	104,612.19	117,987.40	134,407.53	156,395.73	176,412.67	194,089.58	213,035.86	233,636.77	251,934.10
West Nusa Tenggara	70,122.73	68,176.69	69,022.23	73,618.88	81,620.73	105,664.74	116,464.76	123,822.76	123,868.02	132,500.10
East Nusa Tenggara	43,846.61	48,815.24	54,893.15	61,325.26	68,500.43	76,120.79	83,742.79	90,758.93	98,930.19	106,731.76
West Kalimantan	86,065.85	96,727.13	106,958.80	118,640.96	132,345.29	146,653.55	161,364.24	177,493.65	194,138.22	212,150.33
Central Kalimantan	56,531.02	65,871.41	73,425.38	81,956.92	89,889.88	100,063.52	111,967.02	125,817.07	138,616.13	150,046.10
South Kalimantan	85,305.00	98,780.55	106,725.43	115,858.20	127,882.28	137,056.12	146,090.43	159,104.55	171,684.06	180,557.64
East Kalimantan	418,211.58	515,191.48	550,735.76	519,131.87	527,515.26	505,105.06	508,880.24	591,903.49	635,498.68	652,480.26
North Kalimantan	Part of East Kalimantan			52,604.70	59,184.00	61,722.39	66,041.81	76,927.57	85,548.94	96,509.93
North Sulawesi	51,721.33	57,343.60	63,875.31	71,097.46	80,667.63	91,145.68	100,513.84	110,116.73	119,512.68	130,126.51
Central Sulawesi	51,752.07	60,716.29	69,637.92	79,842.22	90,246.27	107,573.47	120,030.01	133,951.16	167,135.77	185,740.09
South Sulawesi	171,740.74	198,289.08	228,285.47	258,836.42	298,033.80	340,390.21	377,108.91	415,588.20	461,774.74	504,320.73
Southeast Sulawesi	48,401.15	55,758.55	64,693.98	71,041.25	78,622.15	87,714.48	96,994.76	107,423.45	118,066.61	129,225.15
Gorontalo	15,475.74	17,406.53	19,669.72	22,129.28	25,193.78	28,493.42	31,697.56	34,537.68	37,731.39	41,145.45
West Sulawesi	17,183.83	20,189.34	22,626.21	25,249.49	29,458.25	32,987.55	35,945.20	39,497.41	43,457.83	46,365.79
Maluku	18,428.58	21,367.86	24,661.75	27,834.44	31,656.48	34,345.96	37,054.41	39,881.55	43,047.09	46,152.82
North Maluku	14,983.91	17,078.14	19,340.46	21,439.49	24,042.08	26,638.30	29,150.60	32,272.57	36,468.79	39,695.49
West Papua	41,361.67	44,254.64	47,421.09	52,997.66	58,180.96	62,888.03	66,631.08	71,785.93	79,644.58	84,356.97
Papua	110,808.18	108,188.76	112,812.56	122,857.17	133,329.98	150,307.28	173,208.86	188,938.08	210,600.57	189,510.70

=== BPS estimates between 2020 and 2025 ===
Province	2020	2021	2022	2023	2024	2025
Indonesia	15,438,017.50	16,970,789.20	19,588,455.60	20,892,376.70	22,138,990.80	23,821,103.60
Aceh	166,372.32	184,976.30	211,750.02	227,110.20	243,202.15	257,502.43
North Sumatra	811,188.31	859,870.95	955,193.09	1,050,995.41	1,146,919.75	1,236,193.57
West Sumatra	241,993.53	252,749.65	285,378.64	312,770.28	333,145.84	352,189.40
Riau	728,649.99	843,211.15	991,589.59	1,026,472.05	1,112,481.62	1,201,383.76
Jambi	206,242.61	233,725.46	276,316.37	293,729.31	323,174.33	349,662.60
South Sumatra	456,647.86	491,566.45	591,603.48	629,099.66	663,961.72	720,205.22
Bengkulu	73,305.27	79,576.33	90,111.95	96,551.38	103,991.93	111,829.42
Lampung	353,530.04	371,903.17	414,131.42	448,880.25	484,042.52	523,846.54
Bangka Belitung Islands	75,495.26	85,942.70	95,285.43	102,635.65	107,503.18	116,811.75
Riau Islands	254,227.86	275,636.33	308,842.68	331,889.50	352,436.43	381,729.88
Jakarta	2,768,189.73	2,914,581.08	3,186,469.91	3,442,980.93	3,679,708.72	3,926,153.30
West Java	2,084,620.25	2,209,822.38	2,422,782.32	2,625,218.58	2,823,451.79	3,038,667.95
Central Java	1,347,922.69	1,420,799.91	1,560,899.02	1,696,795.42	1,817,710.82	1,943,187.66
Special Region of Yogyakarta	138,306.83	149,369.17	165,690.21	180,689.95	193,561.94	208,133.80
East Java	2,299,791.05	2,454,498.80	2,730,907.09	2,953,546.91	3,168,295.58	3,403,166.85
Banten	625,979.35	665,921.92	747,250.29	814,124.34	873,626.25	936,203.98
Bali	223,900.89	219,800.03	245,233.24	274,355.72	298,439.56	324,148.94
West Nusa Tenggara	133,613.74	140,153.32	156,944.05	166,394.91	182,265.62	192,951.54
East Nusa Tenggara	106,480.97	110,885.75	118,718.20	128,523.13	137,458.48	148,373.38
West Kalimantan	214,001.75	231,321.16	255,797.28	274,468.58	300,166.89	328,569.51
Central Kalimantan	152,187.39	170,001.21	199,947.90	208,846.41	222,864.50	241,055.70
South Kalimantan	179,094.11	192,576.58	251,256.54	269,296.45	286,840.06	305,126.93
East Kalimantan	607,586.18	695,158.33	921,332.98	843,571.25	858,193.71	889,072.55
North Kalimantan	100,509.86	110,668.94	138,718.18	147,278.62	146,976.70	156,025.74
North Sulawesi	132,230.06	142,600.02	157,028.36	171,969.42	187,374.29	204,747.14
Central Sulawesi	197,440.78	246,987.36	323,617.16	347,139.17	376,950.32	415,477.22
South Sulawesi	504,059.37	545,230.03	605,144.68	652,574.05	696,252.76	753,077.16
Southeast Sulawesi	130,178.03	139,057.83	158,761.13	176,179.90	189,481.75	204,333.57
Gorontalo	41,729.77	43,896.37	47,574.43	51,374.40	54,559.65	58,977.51
West Sulawesi	46,427.58	50,341.23	54,070.98	58,551.82	64,214.65	71,162.44
Maluku	46,262.45	48,564.22	53,692.91	58,489.79	62,647.51	66,313.12
North Maluku	42,319.47	52,359.85	70,902.61	85,145.36	96,949.45	133,620.32
West Papua	83,588.64	85,072.86	91,291.75	61,571.37	76,177.48	81,807.57
Southwest Papua	Part of West Papua			36,104.47	37,040.34	39,219.64
Papua	199,232.88	235,343.25	262,515.82	81,737.92	85,914.33	90,513.18
South Papua	Part of Papua			31,359.66	33,403.64	35,687.86
Central Papua	Part of Papua			150,371.08	174,942.95	160,519.15
Highland Papua	Part of Papua			24,433.99	26,561.43	28,377.77

== See also ==
- Economy of Indonesia
- List of Indonesian provinces by GDP per capita
- List of Indonesian provinces by Human Development Index
- List of Indonesian provinces by poverty rate
- List of Indonesian cities by GDP
- List of Indonesian regencies by GDP
- List of ASEAN country subdivisions by GDP
