= Coat of arms of the Special Region of Yogyakarta =

- Adopted: 1969
- Crest: Golden 5-sided star.
- Shield: Red, White Golong-Gilig monument inlaid in Gold culminating in a White jasmine flower with a lotus-studded ompak below, twin-winged in Gold 9 large and 8 small feathers, and surrounded by a legend in Javanese script ꦫꦱꦱꦸꦏꦔꦺꦱ꧀ꦛꦶꦥꦿꦗ꧈ rasa suka ngèsthi praja, on the left and ꦪꦺꦴꦒꦾ ꦏꦂꦠꦠꦿꦸꦱ꧀‌ꦩꦤ꧀ꦝꦶꦫꦶ Yogyakarta trus mandhiri on the right.
- Supporters: 8 Cotton leaves and 17 florets on the left, and 45 rice grains on the right.
- Motto: Yogyakarta in black text on white ribbon

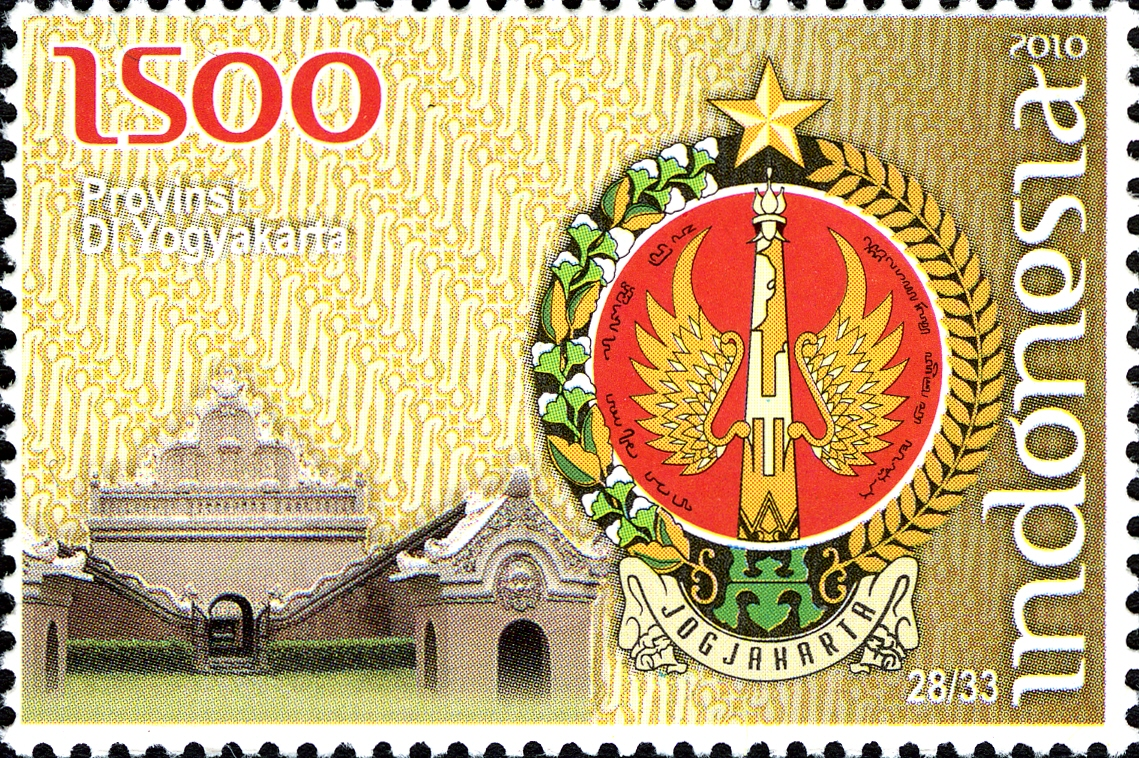
Yogyakarta Special Region Coat of Arms Stamp

The coat of arms of the Special Region of Yogyakarta or often called golong-gilig is a round (golong) and cylindrical (gilig) emblem consisting of a painting of stars, rice and cotton, a winged monument, a red circle surrounded by the words in Javanese "Rasa suka ngèsthi praja Yogyakarta trus mandhiri" using Javanese script and surrounded by a white circle, and a lotus-topped ompak.

The Javanese writing is a sengkalan (chronogram) meaning 1876 Shaka (1945). When the two sengkalan are combined, the meaning becomes, "With a sense of joy to build a good and safe Special Region of Yogyakarta that continues to stand tall (independent)." This emblem was established based on the Regional Regulation of the Special Region of Yogyakarta Number 3 of 1969. (Note: Peraturan daerah 3/1969 refers to the Javanese year of this coat of arms as 1786, but conversion of the Javanese calendar to Gregorian yields 1876, not 1786.)

== Meaning ==
The star symbolizes Ketuhanan yang Maha Esa ("Belief in the one and only God"), the first sila (principle) of the Pancasila philosophy. Rice and cotton are symbols of prosperity. The winged monument is a symbol of humanity, with nine inner wings to represent Hamengkubuwono IX, and eight outer wings to represent Paku Alam VIII. The red and white circle stand for the Indonesian flag. The umpak with the lotus flower is a symbol of populism.

== Motto ==
The Special Region of Yogyakarta has the motto in Indonesian: Hamemayu Hayuning Bawana, meaning "Beautifying the Beauty of the World".
