= List of Indonesian regencies by GDP =

This is a list of regencies in Indonesia by gross regional product (GRP Nominal and PPP) according to Statistics Indonesia.

== Methodology ==
The nominal GRP of the regencies is the most comprehensive measure of national economic activity. It is the regional or provincial counterpart of the national gross domestic product. Statistics Indonesia derives the GRP for a province as the sum of the nominal GRP originating from all the industries in the province at current market prices .

The GRP is the amount of remuneration received by factors of production participating in the production process in a region within a certain period of time (usually one year). With component
1. Household Consumption Expenditures
2. Consumption Expenditures of Non-Profit Institutions Serving Households (NPISHs)
3. Government Consumption Expenditures (GCE)
4. Gross Fixed Capital Formation (GFCF)
5. Changes in Inventories
6. Net Exports (Exports minus Imports)

List of Indonesian regencies by GDP in 2022, with 14,848 IDR = US$1 term of Nominal while 4,850.98 IDR = US$1 term of PPP.

== List Indonesian Regencies by GDP 2022 ==
| Regency | PDRB | | GDP Nominal | | GDP PPP | | Province |
| Regency | (in billion Rp) | Per capita Rp | (in billion $) | Per capita $ | (in billion $) | PPP Per Capita $ | Province |
|---|---|---|---|---|---|---|---|
| Bekasi Regency | 367,573.27 | 114,338,000 | 24.754 | 7,701 | 75.772 | 23,570 | West Java |
| Karawang Regency | 268,228.79 | 107,067,000 | 18.063 | 7,210 | 55.294 | 22,071 | West Java |
| Bogor Regency | 267,743.69 | 48,096,000 | 18.031 | 3,239 | 55.193 | 9,915 | West Java |
| Sidoarjo Regency | 245,222.46 | 116,584,000 | 16.515 | 7,851 | 50.552 | 24,033 | East Java |
| Kutai Kartanegara Regency | 240,402.39 | 325,665,000 | 16.190 | 21,932 | 49.557 | 67,134 | East Kalimantan |
| Kutai Timur Regency | 211,094.48 | 450,268,000 | 14.216 | 30,323 | 43.516 | 92,820 | East Kalimantan |
| Bengkalis Regency | 176,013.38 | 301,924,000 | 11.854 | 20,333 | 36.284 | 62,240 | Riau |
| Pasuruan Regency | 172,654.17 | 106,640,000 | 11.627 | 7,182 | 35.592 | 21,983 | East Java |
| Gresik Regency | 163,907.91 | 122,993,000 | 11.039 | 8,283 | 33.789 | 25,354 | East Java |
| Tangerang Regency | 160,168.18 | 47,776,000 | 10.787 | 3,218 | 33.018 | 9,849 | Banten |
| Morowali Regency | 146,599.32 | 831,798,000 | 9.873 | 56,017 | 30.220 | 171,470 | Central Sulawesi |
| Bandung Regency | 143,002.09 | 38,455,000 | 9.631 | 2,590 | 29.479 | 7,928 | West Java |
| Deli Serdang Regency | 127,546.55 | 65,275,000 | 8.590 | 4,596 | 26.293 | 13,456 | North Sumatra |
| Cilacap Regency | 120,938.30 | 60,815,000 | 8.145 | 4,096 | 24.931 | 12,537 | Central Java |
| Malang Regency | 117,457.03 | 43,731,000 | 7.910 | 2,945 | 24.213 | 9,015 | East Java |
| Kudus Regency | 114,664.50 | 133,888,000 | 7.722 | 9,016 | 23.638 | 27,599 | Central Java |
| Muara Enim Regency | 113,167.46 | 181,353,000 | 7.621 | 12,213 | 23.329 | 37,385 | South Sumatra |
| Mimika Regency | 110,407.81 | 343,247,000 | 7.436 | 23,116 | 22.760 | 70,759 | Central Papua |
| Siak Regency | 107,025.76 | 224,114,000 | 7.208 | 15,093 | 22.063 | 46,200 | Riau |
| Kampar Regency | 103,887.89 | 118,295,000 | 6.997 | 7,966 | 21.415 | 24,386 | Riau |
| Bojonegoro Regency | 100,492.89 | 76,413,000 | 6.768 | 5,146 | 20.716 | 15,752 | East Java |
| Rokan Hilir Regency | 96,066.42 | 145,907,000 | 6.470 | 9,826 | 19.804 | 30,078 | Riau |
| Mojokerto Regency | 95,738.11 | 84,456,000 | 6.447 | 5,688 | 19.736 | 17,411 | East Java |
| Banyuwangi Regency | 93,298.95 | 53,876,000 | 6.283 | 3,628 | 19.233 | 11,106 | East Java |
| Indramayu Regency | 90,773.39 | 48,494,000 | 6.113 | 3,266 | 18.712 | 9,997 | West Java |
| Jember Regency | 88,075.45 | 34,301,000 | 5.931 | 2,310 | 18.516 | 7,071 | East Java |
| Serang Regency | 87,983.13 | 52,405,000 | 5.925 | 3,529 | 18.137 | 10,803 | Banten |
| Indragiri Hilir Regency | 83,422.59 | 126,255,000 | 5.618 | 8,503 | 17.197 | 26,026 | Riau |
| Musi Banyuasin Regency | 82,736.54 | 130,680,000 | 5.572 | 8,801 | 17.056 | 26,939 | South Sumatra |
| Lampung Tengah Regency | 82,454.64 | 54,969,000 | 5.552 | 3,702 | 16.998 | 11,332 | Lampung |
| Purwakarta Regency | 76,468.93 | 74,345,000 | 5.149 | 5,007 | 15.764 | 15,326 | West Java |
| Sukabumi Regency | 76,243.67 | 39,820,000 | 5.135 | 2,682 | 15.717 | 8,209 | West Java |
| Paser Regency | 76,201.78 | 272,086,000 | 5.132 | 18,324 | 15.709 | 56,089 | East Kalimantan |
| Tuban Regency | 75,187.66 | 62,162,000 | 5.064 | 4,186 | 15.500 | 12,814 | East Java |
| Garut Regency | 66,590.62 | 25,346,000 | 4.485 | 1,707 | 13.727 | 5,225 | West Java |
| Pelalawan Regency | 65,569.24 | 159,541,000 | 4.416 | 10,744 | 13.517 | 32,888 | Riau |
| Banyumas Regency | 62,852.91 | 34,802,000 | 4.233 | 2,344 | 12.957 | 7,174 | Central Java |
| Berau Regency | 60,155.56 | 232,677,000 | 4.051 | 15,670 | 12.401 | 47,965 | East Kalimantan |
| Cirebon Regency | 56,653.64 | 24,468,000 | 3.815 | 1,647 | 11.679 | 5,044 | West Java |
| Semarang Regency | 56,632.21 | 53,002,000 | 3.814 | 3,570 | 11.675 | 10,926 | Central Java |
| Badung Regency | 55,290.00 | 100,614,000 | 3.769 | 6,776 | 11.398 | 20,741 | Bali |
| Sleman Regency | 54,656.66 | 47,629,000 | 3.681 | 3,208 | 11.267 | 9,819 | Special Region of Yogyakarta |
| Indragiri Hulu Regency | 54,453.88 | 117,338,000 | 3.667 | 7,902 | 11.225 | 24,189 | Riau |
| Cianjur Regency | 53,988.97 | 21,232,000 | 3.636 | 1,430 | 11.129 | 4,377 | West Java |
| Brebes Regency | 53,771.06 | 26,744,000 | 3.621 | 1,801 | 11.085 | 5,513 | Central Java |
| Bandung Barat Regency | 52,921.29 | 28,653,000 | 3.564 | 1,930 | 10.909 | 5,906 | West Java |
| Lampung Selatan Regency | 51,707.27 | 47,828,000 | 3.482 | 3,221 | 10.659 | 9,859 | Lampung |
| Langkat Regency | 51,412.77 | 49,439,000 | 3.462 | 3,329 | 10.598 | 10,192 | North Sumatra |
| Pati Regency | 50,110.97 | 37,408,000 | 3.374 | 2,519 | 10.330 | 7,711 | Central Java |
| Tanjung Jabung Barat Regency | 50,081.47 | 154,355,000 | 3.372 | 10,395 | 10.323 | 31,819 | Jambi |

== See also ==
- Economy of Indonesia
- List of Indonesian provinces by GDP
- List of Indonesian provinces by GDP per capita
- List of Indonesian cities by GDP
- List of Indonesian provinces by Human Development Index
