= List of Indonesian cities by GDP =

This is a list of cities in Indonesia by gross regional product (GRP Nominal and PPP) according to the Statistics Indonesia.

== Methodology ==
GRP Nominal is the regional or provincial counterpart of the national gross domestic product, the most comprehensive measure of national economic activity. The Statistics Indonesia (Badan Pusat Statistik) derives GRP for a province as the sum of the GRP Nominal originating in all the industries in the province at current prices market.

GRP are the amount of remuneration received by factors of production participating in the production process in a region within a certain period of time (usually one year). With component
1. Household Consumption Expenditures
2. Consumption Expenditures of Non-Profit Institutions Serving Households (NPISHs)
3. Government Consumption Expenditures (GCE)
4. Gross Fixed Capital Formation (GFCF)
5. Changes in Inventories
6. Net Exports (Exports minus Imports)

List of Indonesian cities by GDP Nominal and PPP in 2021, with 14,308 IDR = 1 USD term of Nominal while 4,833.87 IDR = 1 USD term of PPP.

== 2021 data ==
=== List Indonesian Metropolitan City by GDP 2021 ===

Rank	Metropolitan City	Population Estimate	GDP Nominal		GDP PPP		Province
Rank	Metropolitan City	Population Estimate	(in billion $)	Per capita	(in billion $)	PPP Per Capita	Province
1	Jakarta Metropolitan	34,610,726	338.836	9,789	1,085.172	31,353	Jakarta
2	Surabaya Metropolitan	11,797,761	101.105	8,570	323.805	27,446	East Java
3	Bandung Metropolitan	8,678,130	42.383	4,883	135.736	15,641	West Java
4	Balikpapan-Samarinda Metropolitan	2,503,272	33.160	13,246	106.201	42,425	East Kalimantan
5	Medan Metropolitan	5,216,400	31.706	6,078	101.544	19,466	North Sumatra
6	Semarang Metropolitan	6,197,102	29.464	4,750	94.362	13,348	Central Java
7	Pekanbaru Metropolitan	2,718,278	25.279	9,299	76.245	28,048	Riau
8	Makassar Metropolitan	3,332,415	21.472	6,443	68.767	20,635	South Sulawesi
9	Batam Metropolitan	1,917,952	18.484	9,637	59.196	30,864	Riau Islands
10	Malang Metropolitan	3,801,089	15.873	4,176	50.837	13,374	East Java
11	Palembang Metropolitan	2,683,669	15.433	5,750	49.426	18,417	South Sumatra
12	Denpasar Metropolitan	2,301,887	12.108	5,260	38.778	16,846	Bali
13	Surakarta Metropolitan	2,414,666	10.117	4,190	32.402	13,419	Central Java
14	Yogyakarta Metropolitan	2,542,441	9.161	3,603	29.340	11,540	Special Region of Yogyakarta
15	Padang Metropolitan	1,752,482	8.136	4,660	26.056	14,926	West Sumatra
16	Manado Metropolitan	1,377,312	7.711	5,599	24.695	17,930	North Sulawesi
17	Mataram Metropolitan	3,808,908	5.491	1,442	16.253	4,267	West Nusa Tenggara
18	Banjarmasin Metropolitan	1,526,061	5.118	3,354	16.391	10,741	South Kalimantan

=== List Indonesian City Proper by GDP 2021 ===
Rank	City	PDRB		GDP Nominal		GDP PPP		Province
Rank	City	(in billion Rp)	Per capita Rp	(in billion $)	Per capita $	(in billion $)	PPP Per Capita $	Province
1	Jakarta	3,679,359.00	322,620,000	231,929	21,706	774.944	72,527	Jakarta
-	Central Jakarta	860,049.00	819,630,000	56,425	53,773	180.710	172,217	Jakarta
-	South Jakarta	792,615.00	354,541,000	52,001	23,260	166.541	74,495	Jakarta
2	Surabaya	715,294.00	245,685,000	48,689	16,665	162,594	55,651	East Java
-	North Jakarta	631,393.00	349,032,000	41,424	22,899	132.665	73,337	Jakarta
-	East Jakarta	592,230.00	192,306,000	38,854	12,617	124.437	40,407	Jakarta
-	West Jakarta	585,512.00	237,044,000	38,414	15,552	123.025	49,806	Jakarta
3	Bandung	351,285.00	140,114,000	23,437	9,271	78,266	30,961	West Java
4	Medan	303,312.00	105,908,000	20,775	8,357	69,376	27,907	North Sumatra
5	Semarang	248,902.00	146,868,000	16,863	9,869	56,314	32,958	Central Java
6	Makassar	226,903.00	155,952,000	15,320	10,461	51,160	34,933	South Sulawesi
7	Batam	216,098.00	171,968,000	14,689	11,504	49,052	38,418	Riau Islands
8	Tangerang	206,597.00	105,916,000	14,168	7,215	47,314	24,094	Banten
9	Palembang	194,570.00	114,025,000	13,122	7,637	43,821	25,503	South Sumatra
10	Pekanbaru	159,961.00	157,385,000	10,797	10,517	36,056	35,123	Riau
11	Kediri	159,750.00	541,112,000	10,636	35,668	35,518	119,111	East Java
12	Balikpapan	143,169.00	201,637,000	9.393	13,229	30.082	42,367	East Kalimantan
13	Cilegon	129,532.00	287,526,000	8.498	18,864	27.217	60,414	Banten
14	Bekasi	118,963.00	45,281,000	7.805	2,971	24.997	9,514	West Java
15	South Tangerang	104,388.00	75,010,000	6.849	4,921	21.933	15,760	Banten
16	Malang	93,053.00	107,542,000	6.104	7,056	19.552	22,596	East Java
17	Samarinda	89,289.00	104,969,000	5.858	6,887	18.761	22,056	East Kalimantan
18	Depok	87,569.00	40,817,000	5.745	2,678	18.400	8,576	West Java
19	Padang	79,705.00	84,528,000	5.229	5,546	16.747	17,761	West Sumatra
20	Bandar Lampung	74,104.00	61,647,000	4.862	4,045	15.571	12,953	Lampung
21	Bontang	68,106.00	366,463,000	4.468	24,043	14.311	77,000	East Kalimantan
22	Surakarta	60,486.00	114,802,000	3.968	7,532	12.709	24,122	Central Java
23	Denpasar	60,100.00	80,305,000	3.943	5,269	12.628	16,873	Bali
24	Bogor	57,004.00	53,239,000	3.740	3,493	11.977	11,186	West Java
25	Tarakan	52,079.00	207,417,000	3.417	13,608	10.943	43,582	North Kalimantan
26	Dumai	49,034.00	149,083,000	3.217	9,781	10.303	31,325	Riau
27	Manado	48,556.00	105,882,000	3.186	6,947	10.202	22,247	North Sulawesi
29	Pontianak	47,885.00	70,892,000	3.142	4,651	10.061	14,896	West Kalimantan
29	Yogyakarta	46,193.00	122,951,000	3.031	8,066	9.706	25,834	Special Region of Yogyakarta
30	Banjarmasin	42,049.00	63,095,000	2.759	4,140	8.835	13,257	South Kalimantan
31	Cimahi	40,499.00	68,552,000	2.657	4,498	8.510	14,404	West Java
32	Jambi	40,581.00	64,642,000	2.663	4,241	8.527	13,583	Jambi
33	Serang	39,838.00	55,041,000	2.614	3,611	8.371	11,565	Banten
34	Jayapura	37,797.00	91,108,000	2.480	5,977	7.942	19,143	Papua
35	Bengkulu	30,811.00	78,778,000	2.021	5,168	6.474	16,553	Bengkulu
36	Palu	30,787.00	79,452,000	2.020	5,213	6.469	16,695	Central Sulawesi
37	Cirebon	28,773.00	84,135,000	1.888	5,520	6.046	17,678	West Java
38	Kupang	28,478.00	61,030,000	1.868	4,003	5.984	12,823	East Nusa Tenggara
39	Kendari	28,260.00	77,591,000	1.854	5,091	5.938	16,303	Southeast Sulawesi
40	Tasikmalaya	27,411.00	36,955,000	1.798	2,425	5.760	7,765	West Java
41	Palangka Raya	24,175.00	79,057,000	1.586	5,187	5.080	16,611	Central Kalimantan
42	Banda Aceh	23,777.00	90,764,000	1.560	5,955	4.996	19,071	Aceh
43	Tanjung Pinang	23,534.00	100,210,000	1.544	6,575	4.945	21,056	Riau Islands
44	Mataram	22,781.00	51,640,000	1.495	3,388	4.787	10,850	West Nusa Tenggara
45	Bitung	22,674.00	97,545,000	1.488	6,400	4.764	20,496	North Sulawesi
46	Batu	20,524.00	93,209,000	1.346	6,115	4.312	19,585	East Java
47	Tegal	19,162.00	67,764,000	1.258	4,446	4.027	14,238	Central Java
48	Pangkal Pinang	18,809.00	82,736,000	1.234	5,428	3.952	17,384	Bangka Belitung Islands
49	Ambon	18,531.00	51,643,000	1.216	3,388	3.894	10,852	Maluku
50	Madiun	17,256.00	86,285,000	1.132	5,661	3.626	18,130	East Java
51	Sorong	16,829.00	57,051,000	1.104	3,742	3.536	11,987	West Papua
52	Salatiga	16,773.00	84,321,000	1.100	5,532	3.524	17,717	Central Java
53	Pematang Siantar	16,228.00	59,046,000	1.065	3,874	3.410	12,407	North Sumatra
54	Sukabumi	15,350.00	42,562,000	1.007	2,792	3.225	8,943	West Java
55	Binjai	14,460.00	47,679,000	0.949	3,128	3.038	10,018	North Sumatra
56	Probolinggo	14,296.00	57,885,000	0.938	3,798	3.004	12,163	East Java
57	Pekalongan	13,744.00	43,286,000	0.902	2,840	2.888	9,096	Central Java
58	Ternate	13,675.00	64,498,000	0.897	4,232	2.873	13,552	North Maluku
59	Banjarbaru	13,328.00	49,712,000	0.874	3,262	2.800	10,445	South Kalimantan
60	Singkawang	12,899.00	52,412,000	0.846	3,439	2.710	11,013	West Kalimantan
61	Bau Bau	11,522.00	69,346,000	0.756	4,550	2.421	14,571	Southeast Sulawesi
62	Tanjung Balai	11,209.00	61,197,000	0.735	4,015	2.355	12,859	North Sumatra
63	Lhokseumawe	11,170.00	56,597,000	0.733	3,713	2.347	11,892	Aceh
64	Bukittinggi	11,132.00	89,737,000	0.731	5,887	2.339	18,855	West Sumatra
65	Magelang	10,983.00	89,912,000	0.721	5,899	2.308	18,892	Central Java
66	Gorontalo	10,536.00	51,296,000	0.691	3,365	2.214	10,778	Gorontalo
67	Palopo	10,500.00	54,470,000	0.689	3,574	2.206	11,445	South Sulawesi
68	Pasuruan	10,400.00	48,058,000	0.682	3,153	2.185	10,098	East Java
69	Prabumulih	9,834.00	49,006,000	0.645	3,215	2.066	10,297	South Sumatra
70	Sungai Penuh	9,475.00	94,969,000	0.622	6,231	1.991	19,955	Jambi
71	Pare Pare	9,312.00	58,776,000	0.611	3,856	1.957	12,350	South Sulawesi
72	Payakumbuh	8,982.00	62,020,000	0.589	4,069	1.887	13,032	West Sumatra
73	Blitar	8,515.00	55,523,000	0.559	3,642	1.789	11,666	East Java
74	Lubuklinggau	8,234.00	33,887,000	0.540	2,223	1.730	7,120	South Sumatra
75	Mojokerto	8,039.00	59,061,000	0.527	3,875	1.689	12,410	East Java
76	Padang Sidempuan	7,929.00	33,566,000	0.520	2,202	1.666	7,053	North Sumatra
77	Metro	7,865.00	45,237,000	0.516	2,968	1.653	9,505	Lampung
78	Tebing Tinggi	7,428.00	41,519,000	0.487	2,724	1.561	8,724	North Sumatra
79	Gunung Sitoli	6,924.00	48,460,000	0.454	3,179	1.455	10,182	North Sumatra
80	Langsa	6,853.00	35,194,000	0.450	2,309	1.440	7,395	Aceh
81	Sibolga	6,821.00	74,736,000	0.448	4,903	1.433	15,703	North Sumatra
82	Pariaman	6,435.00	66,201,000	0.422	4,343	1.352	13,910	West Sumatra
83	Tomohon	5,448.00	52,853,000	0.357	3,468	1.145	11,105	North Sulawesi
84	Solok	5,262.00	67,600,000	0.345	4,435	1.106	14,204	West Sumatra
85	Banjar	5,247.00	25,284,000	0.344	1,659	1.102	5,313	West Java
86	Bima	4,986.00	30,901,000	0.327	2,027	1.048	6,493	West Nusa Tenggara
87	Sawahlunto	4,825.00	71,214,000	0.317	4,672	1.014	14,964	West Sumatra
88	Kotamobagu	4,799.00	37,576,000	0.315	2,465	1.008	7,895	North Sulawesi
89	Padang Panjang	4,474.00	76,314,000	0.294	5,007	0.940	16,035	West Sumatra
90	Tidore	3,511.00	29,529,000	0.230	1,937	0.738	6,205	North Maluku
91	Pagar Alam	3,491.00	23,611,000	0.229	1,549	0.734	4,961	South Sumatra
92	Tual	3,202.00	34,972,000	0.210	2,294	0.673	7,348	Maluku
93	Subulussalam	2,560.00	26,428,000	0.168	1,734	0.538	5,553	Aceh
94	Sabang	1,747.00	40,732,000	0.115	2,672	0.367	8,558	Aceh

== See also ==
- Economy of Indonesia
- List of Indonesian provinces by GDP
- List of Indonesian provinces by GDP per capita
- List of Indonesian regencies by GDP
- List of Indonesian provinces by Human Development Index
