= Special Region of Yogyakarta Regional House of Representatives =

Unicameral legislature of the Indonesian province of Special Region of Yogyakarta

Special Region of Yogyakarta Regional House of Representatives Dewan Perwakilan Rakyat Daerah Daerah Istimewa Yogyakarta ꦞꦺꦮꦤ꧀ꦦꦼꦂꦮꦏꦶꦭꦤ꧀ꦬꦏꦾꦠ꧀ꦞꦲꦺꦫꦃꦞꦲꦺꦫꦃꦆꦱ꧀ꦠꦶꦩꦺꦮꦔꦪꦺꦴꦒꦾꦏꦂꦠ
- 2024–2029 Period
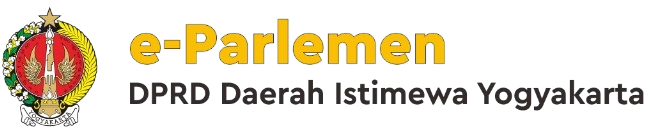

Type
- Type: Unicameral
- Term limits: 5 years

History
- Founded: 1950; 76 years ago
- New session started: 2 September 2024

Leadership
- Speaker: Nuryadi, S.Pd., PDI-P since 23 October 2024
- Deputy Speaker: Budi Waljiman, S.H., Gerindra since 23 October 2024
- Deputy Speaker: Ir. Imam Taufik, PKS since 23 October 2024
- Deputy Speaker: Umaruddin Masdar, S.Ag., PKB since 23 October 2024

Structure
- Seats: 55
- Political groups: Government (27): Gerindra (8); PKB (6); Golkar (6); PAN (5); PSI (1); PPP (1); Supported by (28): PDI-P (19); PKS (7); NasDem (2)

Elections
- Voting system: Open list proportional representation
- Last election: 14 February 2024
- Next election: 2029

Meeting place
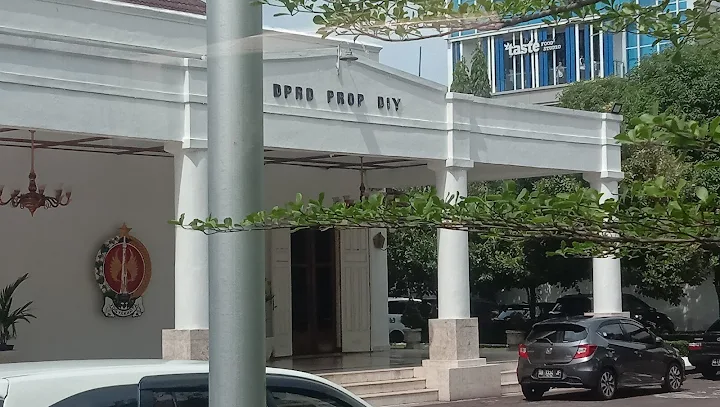
- Special Region of Yogyakarta Regional House of Representatives; Malioboro Street Number 54; Danurejan, Yogyakarta; Special Region of Yogyakarta, Indonesia

Website
- www.dprd-diy.go.id

The Special Region of Yogyakarta Regional House of Representatives (Indonesian: Dewan Perwakilan Rakyat Daerah Daerah Istimewa Yogyakarta; Javanese: ꦞꦺꦮꦤ꧀ꦦꦼꦂꦮꦏꦶꦭꦤ꧀ꦬꦏꦾꦠ꧀ꦞꦲꦺꦫꦃꦞꦲꦺꦫꦃꦆꦱ꧀ꦠꦶꦩꦺꦮꦔꦪꦺꦴꦒꦾꦏꦂꦠ, romanized: Dhéwan Perwakilan Rakyat Dhaérah Dhaérah Istiméwa Ngayogyakarta, abbreviated to DPRD DIY) is the unicameral legislature of the Indonesian province of Special Region of Yogyakarta. Consisting of 55 people from the political parties with the most votes and elected every five years together with the national legislative election.

== General election results ==
=== 2024 Indonesian legislative election ===
The official valid votes received by political parties contesting the 2024 Indonesian legislative election in each electoral district (constituency) for the Special Region of Yogyakarta Regional House of Representatives are as follows.

2024 Indonesian legislative election results

| Electoral district | PKB | Gerindra | PDI-P | Golkar | NasDem | Labour | Gelora | PKS | PKN | Hanura | Garuda | PAN | PBB | Democratic | PSI | Perindo | PPP | Ummat | Valid votes |
|---|---|---|---|---|---|---|---|---|---|---|---|---|---|---|---|---|---|---|---|
| Special Region of Yogyakarta 1 | 13,003 | 32,505 | 68,014 | 12,896 | 11,161 | 2,782 | 1,293 | 33,025 | 184 | 458 | 356 | 26,674 | 712 | 4,590 | 16,867 | 2,167 | 12,112 | 6,611 | 245,410 |
| Special Region of Yogyakarta 2 | 34,808 | 47,810 | 71,673 | 39,528 | 3,048 | 1,810 | 1,215 | 41,145 | 100 | 317 | 501 | 41,209 | 519 | 6,313 | 5,623 | 1,181 | 4,215 | 9,046 | 310,061 |
| Special Region of Yogyakarta 3 | 35,198 | 49,526 | 68,616 | 20,923 | 3,846 | 2,223 | 1,331 | 44,870 | 230 | 590 | 582 | 18,986 | 648 | 5,432 | 7,111 | 1,008 | 18,395 | 18,975 | 298,490 |
| Special Region of Yogyakarta 4 | 39,384 | 39,745 | 96,058 | 33,454 | 3,492 | 800 | 1,113 | 29,832 | 201 | 265 | 574 | 17,307 | 228 | 2,370 | 3,859 | 699 | 3,450 | 6,686 | 279,517 |
| Special Region of Yogyakarta 5 | 38,909 | 36,318 | 80,862 | 39,558 | 15,688 | 2,767 | 975 | 42,596 | 463 | 724 | 551 | 38,742 | 409 | 8,853 | 12,535 | 1,849 | 21,586 | 6,612 | 349,997 |
| Special Region of Yogyakarta 6 | 40,358 | 46,037 | 114,436 | 20,281 | 19,861 | 2,072 | 887 | 46,203 | 189 | 374 | 442 | 32,425 | 505 | 4,248 | 8,099 | 876 | 5,539 | 4,761 | 347,593 |
| Special Region of Yogyakarta 7 | 55,948 | 65,289 | 100,788 | 56,168 | 73,306 | 2,150 | 3,911 | 52,640 | 721 | 1,423 | 747 | 38,871 | 485 | 13,271 | 7,100 | 1,864 | 2,494 | 6,571 | 483,747 |
| Total | 257,608 | 317,230 | 600,447 | 222,808 | 130,402 | 14,604 | 10,725 | 290,311 | 2,088 | 4,151 | 3,753 | 214,214 | 3,506 | 45,077 | 61,194 | 9,644 | 67,791 | 59,262 | 2,314,815 |
Source: General Elections Commission of Indonesia

== Composition ==
The following is the composition of members of the Special Region of Yogyakarta Regional House of Representatives in the last four periods.

| Party | Total seats | | | |
| Party | 2009–2014 | 2014–2019 | 2019–2024 | 2024–2029 |
|---|---|---|---|---|
| PKB seats | 5 | 5 | ▲6 | 6 |
| Gerindra seats | 3 | ▲7 | 7 | ▲8 |
| PDI-P seats | 12 | ▲14 | ▲17 | ▲19 |
| Golkar seats | 6 | ▲8 | ▼5 | ▲6 |
| NasDem seats | | 3 | 3 | ▼2 |
| PKS seats | 7 | ▼6 | ▲7 | 7 |
| Hanura seats | 1 | ▼0 | 0 | 0 |
| PAN seats | 8 | 8 | ▼7 | ▼5 |
| Demokrat seats | 10 | ▼2 | ▼1 | ▼0 |
| PSI seats | | | 1 | 1 |
| PPP seats | 2 | 2 | ▼1 | 1 |
| PKPB seats | 1 | | | |
| Total Seats | 55 | 55 | 55 | 55 |
| Total Party | 10 | ▼9 | ▲10 | ▼9 |

== Electoral District ==
In the 2019 Legislative Election and the 2024 Legislative Election, the Special Region of Yogyakarta Regional House of Representatives election was divided into 7 electoral districts as follows:

| Electoral District Name | Electoral District Area | Number of Seats |
|---|---|---|
| SPECIAL REGION OF YOGYAKARTA 1 | Yogyakarta | 7 |
| SPECIAL REGION OF YOGYAKARTA 2 | Bantul Regency A (Kretek, Pundong, Bambanglipuro, Jetis, Imogiri, Dlingo, Banguntapan, Pleret, Piyungan) | 7 |
| SPECIAL REGION OF YOGYAKARTA 3 | Bantul Regency B (Srandakan, Sanden, Pandak, Pajangan, Bantul, Sewon, Kasihan, Sedayu) | 6 |
| SPECIAL REGION OF YOGYAKARTA 4 | Kulon Progo Regency | 7 |
| SPECIAL REGION OF YOGYAKARTA 5 | Sleman Regency A (Gamping, Godean, Moyudan, Minggir, Seyegan, Mlati, Depok, Berbah) | 9 |
| SPECIAL REGION OF YOGYAKARTA 6 | Sleman Regency B (Prambanan, Kalasan, Ngemplak, Ngaglik, Sleman, Tempel, Turi, Pakem, Cangkringan) | 8 |
| SPECIAL REGION OF YOGYAKARTA 7 | Gunung Kidul Regency | 11 |
| TOTAL | | 55 |

== List of members ==
=== 2024–2029 Period ===
The following is a list of members of the Special Region of Yogyakarta Regional House of Representatives for the 2024–2029 term.

| Member Name | Political party | Electoral District | Valid Vote | Faction | Information |
|---|---|---|---|---|---|
| Dr. Aslam Ridlo, M.A.P. | PKB | Special Region of Yogyakarta 2 | 20.309 | PKB | |
| Umaruddin Masdar, S.Ag. | PKB | Special Region of Yogyakarta 3 | 21.760 | PKB | 3rd Deputy Speaker |
| Hifni Muhammad Nasikh, S.E., M.B.A. | PKB | Special Region of Yogyakarta 4 | 19.266 | PKB | |
| Rahayu Widi Nuryani, S.H., M.H. | PKB | Special Region of Yogyakarta 5 | 26.089 | PKB | |
| Tri Nugroho, S.E. | PKB | Special Region of Yogyakarta 6 | 28.629 | PKB | |
| Timbul Suryanto | PKB | Special Region of Yogyakarta 7 | 20.541 | PKB | |
| Budi Waljiman, S.H. | Gerindra | Special Region of Yogyakarta 1 | 13.961 | Gerindra | 1st Deputy Speaker |
| Nur Subiyantoro, S.I.Kom. | Gerindra | Special Region of Yogyakarta 2 | 26.374 | Gerindra | |
| Dr. Danang Wahyu Broto, S.E., M.Si. | Gerindra | Special Region of Yogyakarta 3 | 23.428 | Gerindra | |
| Ika Damayanti Fatma Negara, S.I.P. | Gerindra | Special Region of Yogyakarta 4 | 25.090 | Gerindra | |
| Anton Prabu Semendawai, S.H., M.Kn. | Gerindra | Special Region of Yogyakarta 5 | 11.990 | Gerindra | |
| M. Lisman Pujakusuma, S.P. | Gerindra | Special Region of Yogyakarta 6 | 16.692 | Gerindra | |
| Purwanto, S.T. | Gerindra | Special Region of Yogyakarta 7 | 19.859 | Gerindra | |
| Didik Kuswanto, S.E. | Gerindra | Special Region of Yogyakarta 7 | 12.832 | Gerindra | |
| Rb. Dwi Wahyu B., S.Pd., M.Si. | PDI-P | Special Region of Yogyakarta 1 | 19.105 | PDI Perjuangan | |
| Imam Priyono D. Putranto, S.E., M.Si. | PDI-P | Special Region of Yogyakarta 1 | 12.514 | PDI Perjuangan | |
| Eko Suwanto, S.T., M.Si. | PDI-P | Special Region of Yogyakarta 1 | 7.264 | PDI Perjuangan | |
| Tustiyani, S.H. | PDI-P | Special Region of Yogyakarta 2 | 27.876 | PDI Perjuangan | |
| H. Ispriyatun Katir Triatmojo | PDI-P | Special Region of Yogyakarta 2 | 13.518 | PDI Perjuangan | |
| Andriana Wulandari, S.E. | PDI-P | Special Region of Yogyakarta 3 | 24.896 | PDI Perjuangan | |
| D. Radjut Sukasworo | PDI-P | Special Region of Yogyakarta 3 | 11.622 | PDI Perjuangan | |
| Fajar Gegana, S.T. | PDI-P | Special Region of Yogyakarta 4 | 30.777 | PDI Perjuangan | |
| Akhid Nuryati, S.E. | PDI-P | Special Region of Yogyakarta 4 | 28.106 | PDI Perjuangan | |
| Reda Refitra S. | PDI-P | Special Region of Yogyakarta 4 | 19.732 | PDI Perjuangan | |
| Hj. Yuni Satia Rahayu, S.S., M.Hum. | PDI-P | Special Region of Yogyakarta 5 | 17.460 | PDI Perjuangan | |
| H. Koeswanto, S.I.P. | PDI-P | Special Region of Yogyakarta 5 | 14.552 | PDI Perjuangan | |
| Yan Kurnia Kustanto, S.E. | PDI-P | Special Region of Yogyakarta 5 | 9.930 | PDI Perjuangan | |
| Haris Sugiharta, S.I.P. | PDI-P | Special Region of Yogyakarta 6 | 31.507 | PDI Perjuangan | |
| Dra. Rita Nurmastuti, M.Pd. | PDI-P | Special Region of Yogyakarta 6 | 24.452 | PDI Perjuangan | |
| Sukapdi | PDI-P | Special Region of Yogyakarta 6 | 19.137 | PDI Perjuangan | |
| Nuryadi, S.Pd. | PDI-P | Special Region of Yogyakarta 7 | 21.249 | PDI Perjuangan | Speaker |
| J. Arga Seloka | PDI-P | Special Region of Yogyakarta 7 | 20.725 | PDI Perjuangan | |
| Demas Kursiswanto, A.Md. | PDI-P | Special Region of Yogyakarta 7 | 11.865 | PDI Perjuangan | |
| Drs. H. Suwardi | Golkar | Special Region of Yogyakarta 2 | 19.179 | Golkar | |
| Arni Tyas Palupi, S.T. | Golkar | Special Region of Yogyakarta 3 | 9.627 | Golkar | |
| Lilik Syaiful Ahmad, S.P. | Golkar | Special Region of Yogyakarta 4 | 14.667 | Golkar | |
| Dra. Hj. Sri Muslimatun, M.Kes. | Golkar | Special Region of Yogyakarta 5 | 13.486 | Golkar | |
| Agus Sumaryanto, S.T. (2024) | Golkar | Special Region of Yogyakarta 6 | 13.173 | Golkar | Died on 3 December 2024. |
| Listiana Lestari, S.H. (2025–present) | Golkar | Special Region of Yogyakarta 6 | 1.138 | Golkar | Interim replacement in the name of Agus Sumaryanto, S.T. |
| Syarief Guska Laksana, S.H. | Golkar | Special Region of Yogyakarta 7 | 20.187 | Golkar | |
| Suharno, S.E. | NasDem | Special Region of Yogyakarta 7 | 38.929 | NasDem PPP PSI | |
| Ismail Ishom | NasDem | Special Region of Yogyakarta 7 | 9.963 | NasDem PPP PSI | |
| Muhammad Syafi'i, S.Psi. | PKS | Special Region of Yogyakarta 1 | 8.287 | PKS | |
| Amir Syarifudin | PKS | Special Region of Yogyakarta 2 | 24.243 | PKS | |
| H. Sigit Nursyam Priyanto, S.Si., M.Ec.Dev. | PKS | Special Region of Yogyakarta 3 | 20.686 | PKS | |
| Muh. Ajrudin Akbar, S.Sos.I. | PKS | Special Region of Yogyakarta 4 | 16.396 | PKS | |
| Sofyan Setyo Darmawan, S.T., M.Eng. | PKS | Special Region of Yogyakarta 5 | 21.602 | PKS | |
| Basit Sugiyanto, S.E., M.M. | PKS | Special Region of Yogyakarta 6 | 18.702 | PKS | |
| Ir. Imam Taufik | PKS | Special Region of Yogyakarta 7 | 13.550 | PKS | 2nd Deputy Speaker |
| Rifki Listianto, S.Si., M.Sc. | PAN | Special Region of Yogyakarta 1 | 9.919 | PAN | |
| Wildan Nafis, S.E., M.H. | PAN | Special Region of Yogyakarta 2 | 20.967 | PAN | |
| Arif Kurniawan, S.Ag., M.H. | PAN | Special Region of Yogyakarta 5 | 27.676 | PAN | |
| Raden Inokia A. P. | PAN | Special Region of Yogyakarta 6 | 19.514 | PAN | |
| Arif Setiadi, S.I.P. | PAN | Special Region of Yogyakarta 7 | 25.350 | PAN | |
| Dr. Stevanus Christian Handoko, S.Kom., M.M. | PSI | Special Region of Yogyakarta 1 | 3.846 | NasDem PPP PSI | |
| H. Muhammad Yazid, S.Ag. | PPP | Special Region of Yogyakarta 5 | 14.816 | NasDem PPP PSI | |

== See also ==
- Regional House of Representatives
