= Special Region of Yogyakarta =

Autonomous province in Java, Indonesia

Special Region of Yogyakarta Daerah Istimewa Yogyakarta ꦥꦤꦒꦫꦩꦶꦫꦸꦁꦒꦤ꧀ꦔꦪꦺꦴꦒꦾꦏꦂꦠ Panagara Mirunggan Ngayogyakarta
- Province with special status
- Coat of arms
- Motto(s): ꦫꦱꦱꦸꦏꦔꦺꦱ꧀ꦛꦶꦥꦿꦗ꧈ ꦪꦺꦴꦒꦾꦏꦂꦠꦠꦿꦸꦱ꧀‌ꦩꦤ꧀ꦝꦶꦫꦶ Rasa Suka Ngèsthi Praja, Yogyakarta Trus Mandhiri (Javanese) "The Love of the People, Yogyakarta will to Independence"
- Special Region of Yogyakarta in Indonesia
- Interactive map of Special Region of Yogyakarta
- Coordinates: 7°47′S 110°22′E
- Country: Indonesia
- Region: Java (Western Indonesia)
- Established: 4 March 1950
- Capital and largest city: Yogyakarta

Government
  - Type: Devolved non-sovereign diarchical special region within a unitary republic
  - Body: Special Region of Yogyakarta Provincial Government
  - Governor: Hamengkubuwono X (Indp.) (Note: Concurrently as the Sultan of the Yogyakarta Sultanate.)
  - Vice Governor: Paku Alam X (Note: Concurrently as Duke of Pakualam.)
  - Legislature: Special Region of Yogyakarta Regional House of Representatives (DPRD)

Area
  - Total: 3,170.363 km^{2} (1,224.084 sq mi)
  - Rank: 37th in Indonesia
- Highest elevation (Mount Merapi): 2,955 m (9,695 ft)

Population (mid 2025 estimate)
  - Total: 3,781,550
  - Rank: 18th in Indonesia
  - Density: 1,192.78/km^{2} (3,089.29/sq mi)

Demographics
  - Ethnic groups (2003): 96% Javanese; 0.6% Sundanese; 3.4% other
  - Religion (2010): 92.62% Islam: 7.18% Christianity; 4.5% Catholicism; 2.68% Protestantism; 0.09% Hinduism; 0.09% Buddhism; 0.02% other
  - Languages: Indonesian (official); Javanese (co-official)
- Time zone: UTC+7 (WIB)
- Postal code: 55xxx
- ISO 3166 code: ID-YO
- Vehicle registration: AB
- GDP (nominal): 2024
- Total: Rp 193.5 trillion (21nd); US$ 12.1 billion Int$ 40.7 billion (PPP)
- Per capita: Rp 51.4 million (28th); US$ 3,245; Int$ 10,841 (PPP)
- Growth: ▲5.15%
- HDI (2024): ▲0.824 (2nd) – very high
- Website: jogjaprov.go.id

The Special Region of Yogyakarta, (Note: also known as Special Territory of Yogyakarta) (English: /ˌjoʊɡjəˈkɑːrtə/; Indonesian: Daerah Istimewa Yogyakarta; DIY; Javanese: ꦥꦤꦒꦫꦩꦶꦫꦸꦁꦒꦤ꧀ꦔꦪꦺꦴꦒꦾꦏꦂꦠ, romanized: Panagara Mirunggan Ngayogyakarta) simply Yogyakarta, is a province-level special region of Indonesia in southern Java. It is a semi-enclave that is surrounded by on the landward side by Central Java Province to the west, north, and east, but has a long coastline on the Indian Ocean to the south.

Co-ruled by the Yogyakarta Sultanate and the Principality of Pakualaman, the region is the only officially recognized diarchy within the government of Indonesia. The city of Yogyakarta is a popular tourist destination and cultural center of the region. The Yogyakarta Sultanate was established in 1755 and provided unwavering support for Indonesia's independence during the Indonesian National Revolution (1945–1949). As a first-level division in Indonesia, Yogyakarta is governed by Sultan Hamengkubuwono X as the governor and Duke Paku Alam X as the vice governor. With a land area of just 3,170.363 km^{2}, it is the second-smallest province-level entity of Indonesia after Jakarta.

== Name ==
In Javanese, it is pronounced [joɡjaˈkartɔ], and named after the city of Ayodhya in Javanese-Hindu mythology. The Dutch spelling of the name is Djokjakarta.

Yogyakarta has many alternative names, mostly written and pronounced as "Jogjakarta" or "Jogja" and sometimes written as "Ngayogyakarta", which are determined as common mistakes. Although the official name is "Yogyakarta", the alternative name, "Jogja" is more popular than the official name (even the government uses the alternative name for tourism), mainly because it is easier to pronounce than the official one.

== History ==
Praja Cihna (Javanese: ꦥꦿꦗꦕꦶꦃꦤ), coat of arms or crest of the Yogyakarta Sultanate that is upheld by Mataram society. The crest contains the Javanese script ꦲꦨ꧀ꦮ, a royal monogram of Hamengkubuwono.

The Sultanate has existed in various forms and survived through the rule of the Dutch and the 1942 invasion of the Dutch East Indies by the Empire of Japan. In August 1945 Indonesia's first president, Sukarno proclaimed the independence of the Republic of Indonesia, and by September of that year, Sultan Hamengkubuwono IX and Duke Sri Paku Alam VIII had sent letters to Sukarno expressing their support for the newly born nation of Indonesia, in which they acknowledged the Yogyakarta Sultanate as part of the Indonesian Republic. The Sunanate of Surakarta did the same, and both of the Javanese kingdoms were awarded special status as special regions within the Indonesian Republic. However, due to a leftist anti-royalist uprising in Surakarta, the Sunanate of Surakarta lost its special administrative status in 1946 and was absorbed into the province of Central Java.

Yogyakarta's overwhelming support and the Sultan's patriotism were essential in the Indonesian struggle for independence during the Indonesian National Revolution (1945–1949). The city of Yogyakarta became the capital of Indonesia from January 1946 to December 1948 after the fall of Jakarta to the Dutch. Later, the Dutch also invaded Yogyakarta causing the Indonesian Republic's capital to be transferred again to Bukittinggi in West Sumatra on 19 December 1948. In return for Yogyakarta's support, the declaration of Special Authority over Yogyakarta was granted in full in 1950 and Yogyakarta was given the status of a Special Administrative Region, making Yogyakarta the only region headed by a monarchy in Indonesia. During the early days after its independence, there had been similar regions led by monarchs, such as the Special Region of Surakarta (province-level) and the Special Region of Kutai (regency-level).

The Special Region was struck by a 6.3-magnitude earthquake on 27 May 2006, killing 5,782 people, injuring approximately 36,000, and leaving 600,000 people homeless. The region of Bantul suffered the most damage and deaths.

== Geography and Population ==
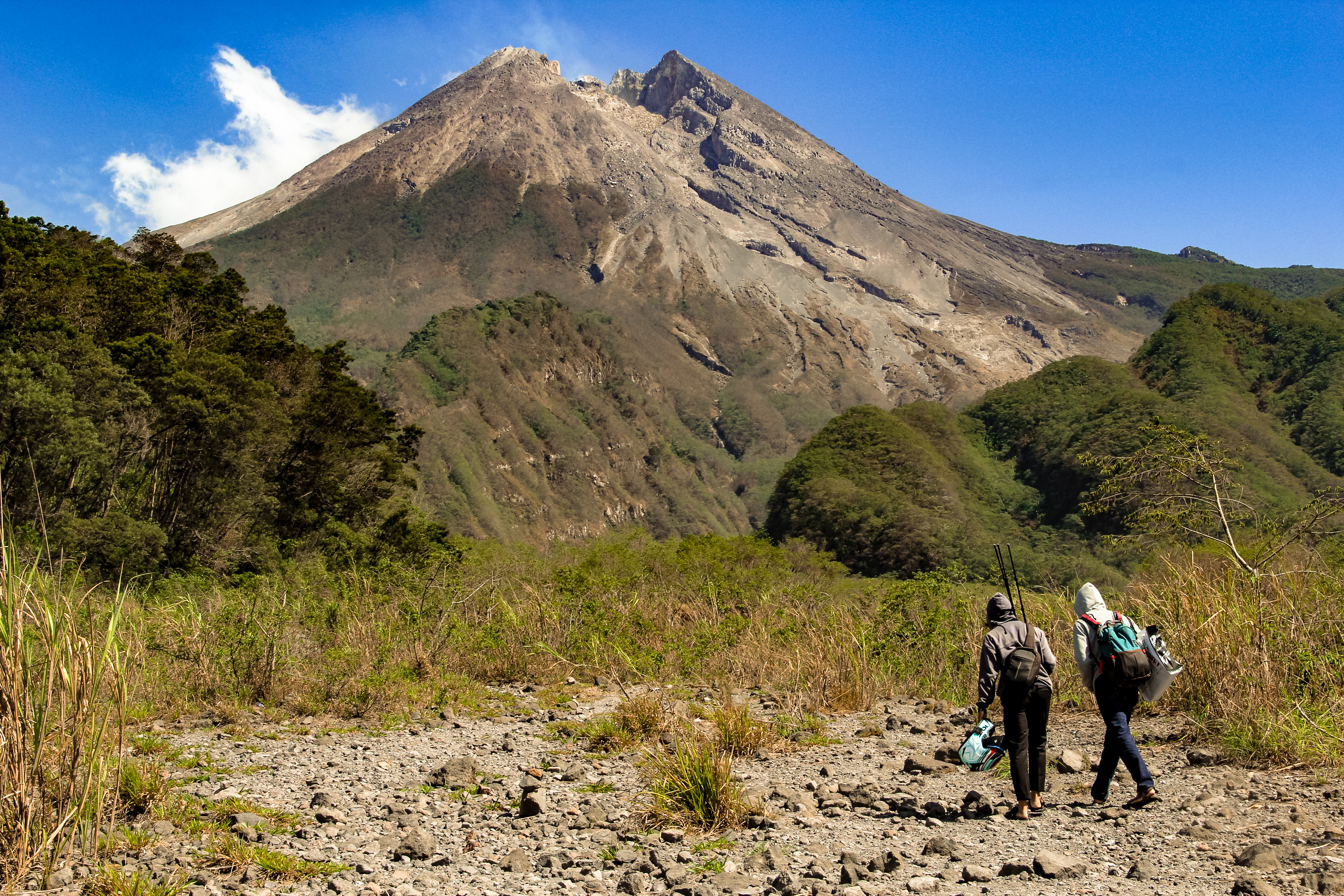
View of Mount Merapi

The Special Region is located near the southern coast of Java, surrounded on three sides by the province of Central Java, and with the Indian Ocean on the south side. The population at the 2010 Census was 3,457,491 people, which then increased to 3,668,719 at the 2020 Census; the official estimate for mid-2025 was 3,781,550 (comprising 1,870,140 males and 1,911,410 females), and is projected to rise to 3,802,720 by mid 2026. It has a land area of 3,170.363 km^{2}, making it the second-smallest area of the provinces in Indonesia, after the Jakarta Capital Region. Along with surrounding areas in Central Java, it has some of the highest population densities of Java.

Mount Merapi is located to the immediate north of the city of Yogyakarta and Sleman Regency. It is the most active volcano in Indonesia and has erupted regularly since 1548. It last erupted in October–November 2010, killing and injuring many people and temporarily displacing approximately 100,000 residents.

=== Geo-heritage sites ===
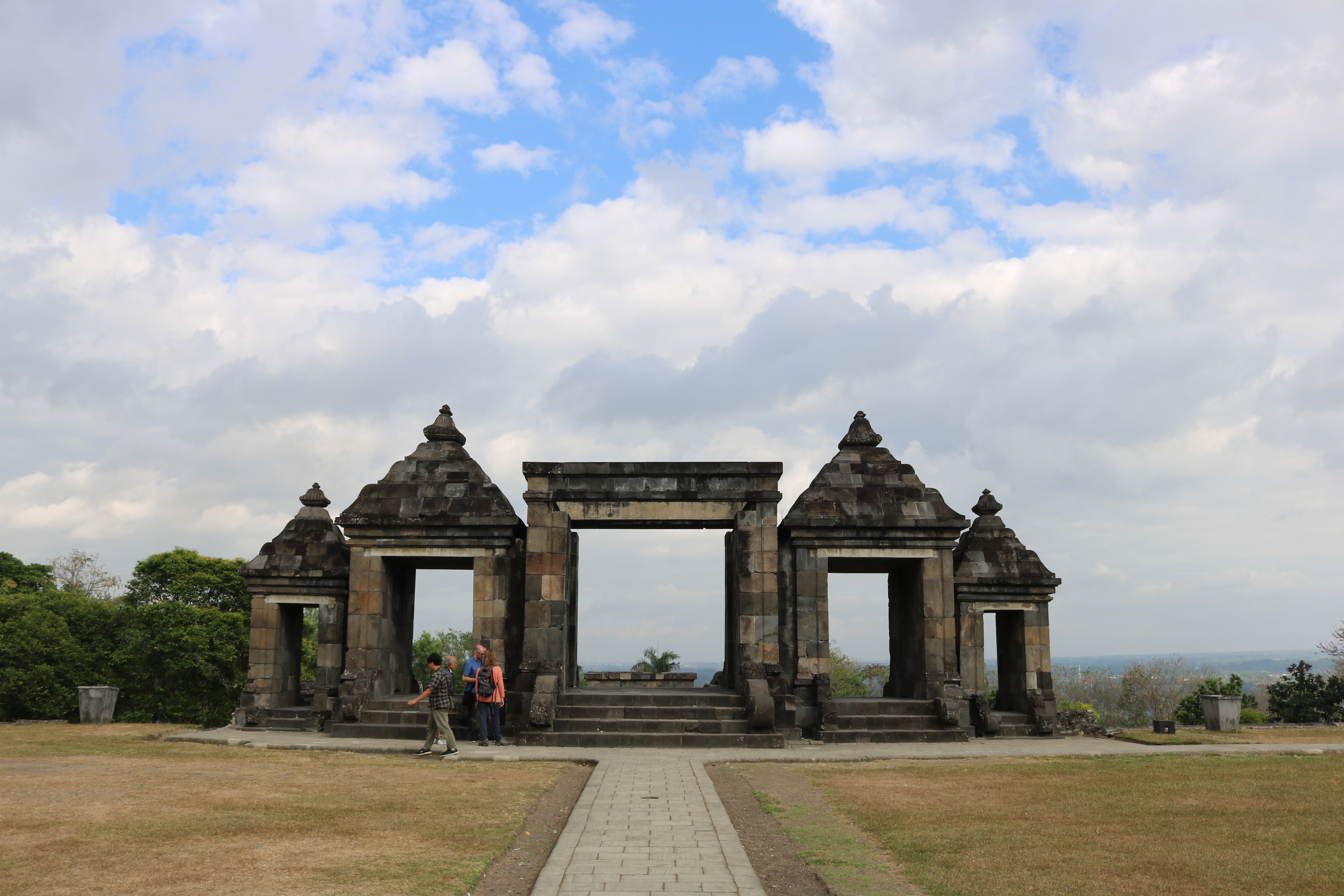
Ratu Boko

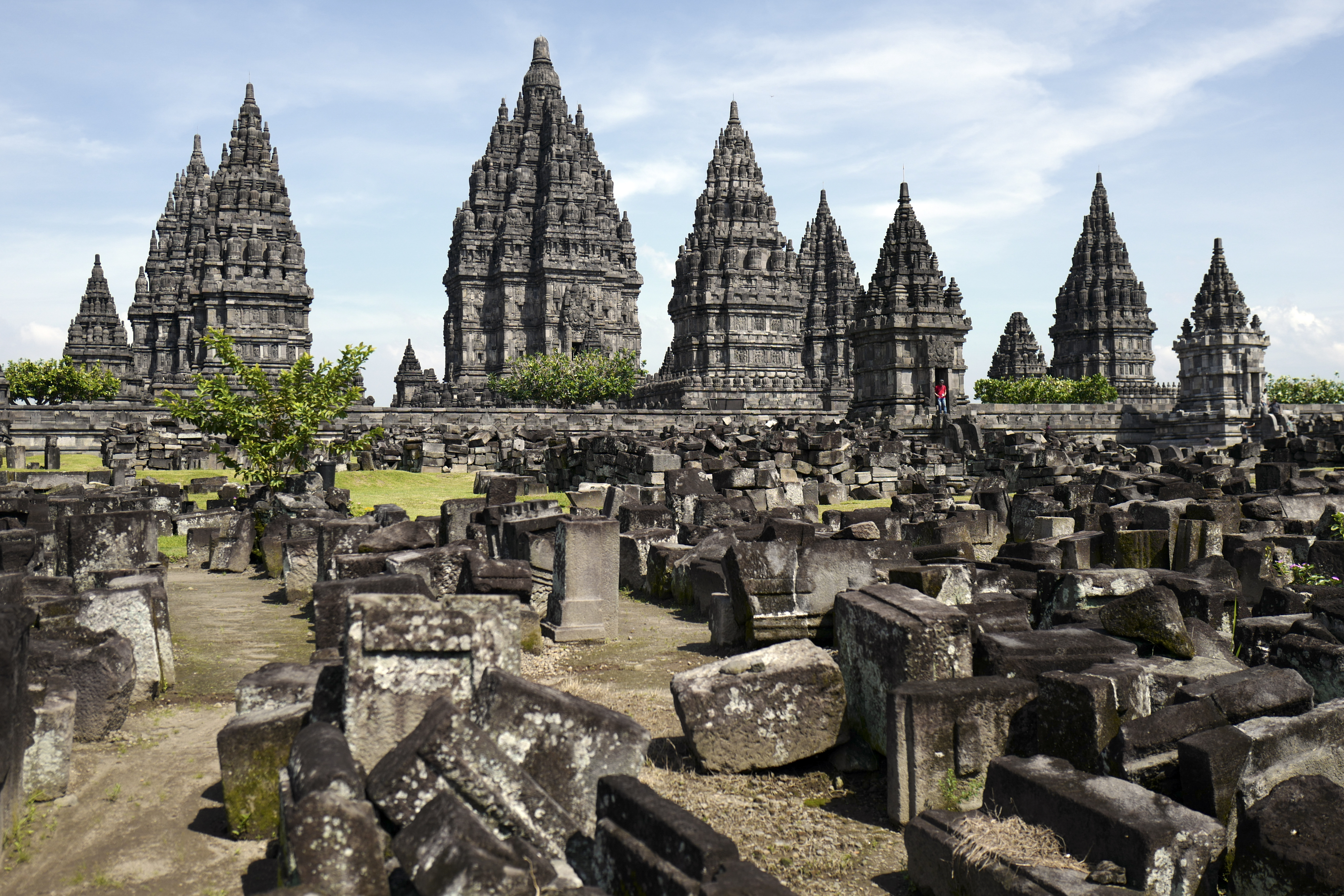
Prambanan temple

Indonesia has several geo-heritage sites in the Yogyakarta Special Region. It has been declared by the Geological Agency of the Ministry of Energy and Mineral Resources. The sites consist of nine sites: Eocene limestone in Gamping (Sleman Regency), pillow lava in Berbah (Sleman), pre-historic volcanic sediment in Candi Ijo, Prambanan (Sleman), dunes in Parangtritis Beach (Bantul Regency), Kiskendo cave, and former manganese mining site in Kleripan (Kulonprogo regency), the prehistoric volcano in Nglanggeran (Gunungkidul regency), Wediombo-Siung beaches (Gunungkidul) and Bioturbasi site in Kalingalang (Gunungkidul). The most unusual one is pillow lava in Berbah (Sleman) which is a big, rough black rock that lies on the bank of the narrow Dengkeng River. The prehistoric volcano in Nglanggeran (Gunungkidul Regency) has already been developed as a tourist destination.

== Government and politics ==
=== Governor and legislature ===
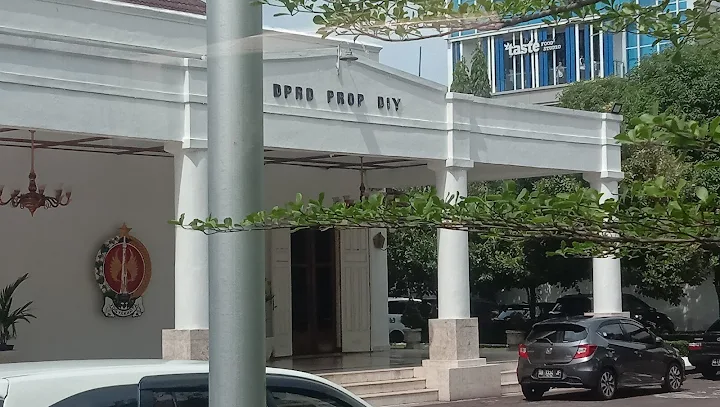
The Special Region of Yogyakarta's parliament (DPRD) building

According to Act No. 22 of 1948 (which is also the basis of Act No. 3 of 1950 on the formation of DIY), the Head and Vice Head of the Special Region are appointed by the president from the descendants of the ruling family in the region before Indonesian independence with the conditions of "skill, honesty, and loyalty, and keeping in mind the customs of the area." Thus, the Head of the Special Region, until 1988, was automatically held by the reigning Sultan of Yogyakarta, and the Vice Head of the Special Region, until 1998, was automatically held by Prince Paku Alam who was on the throne. The nomenclature of the Governor and Vice Governor of the Special Region has only been used since 1999 with the issuance of Act No. 22 of 1999. Since 2012, the mechanism for filling the positions of Governor and Vice Governor of DIY is regulated by Act No. 13 of 2012 on the Uniqueness of the Special Region of Yogyakarta.

The province has a regional legislature, the Special Region of Yogyakarta Regional House of Representatives (DPRD), which as of the 2024 election has 55 members (45 men and 10 women). The largest party in the legislature is the Indonesian Democratic Party of Struggle (DPI-P) with 19 representatives; of other parties elected to the House, Gerindra had 8 members, the PKS had 7 members, the PKB and Golkar each had 6 members, and PAN had 5 members, while Demokrat had 2 members and PPP and PSI each had 1 member.

=== Administrative divisions ===
The Special Region of Yogyakarta (provincial level) is subdivided into four regencies (kabupaten) and one city (kota), and divided further into districts known as kapanewon {in the 4 regencies) or kemantren (in the city of Yogyakarta) and then further sub-divided into villages (rural kalurahan or urban kelurahan; the city and regencies are listed below, with their areas and their population at the 2000, 2010 and 2020 Censuses, together with their official estimates as at mid 2025.

Kode Wilayah	Name	Capital	Area (km^{2})	Population 2000 Census	Population 2010 Census	Population 2020 Census	Population mid 2025 Estimate	HDI 2021 Estimates
34.01	Kulon Progo Regency	Wates	576.80	371,000	388,859	436,395	447,460	0.747 (High)
34.02	Bantul Regency	Bantul	511.53	781,000	911,503	985,770	1,025,750	0.802 (Very High)
34.03	Gunungkidul Regency	Wonosari	1,475.46	670,400	675,382	747,161	753,190	0.701 (High)
34.04	Sleman Regency	Sleman	573.75	901,400	1,093,110	1,125,804	1,179,380	0.840 (Very High)
34.71	Yogyakarta City	Yogyakarta City	32.82	396,700	388,627	373,589	375,770	0.871 (Very High)
	Totals		3,170.36	3,121,045	3,457,491	3,668,719	3,781,550	0.802 (Very High)

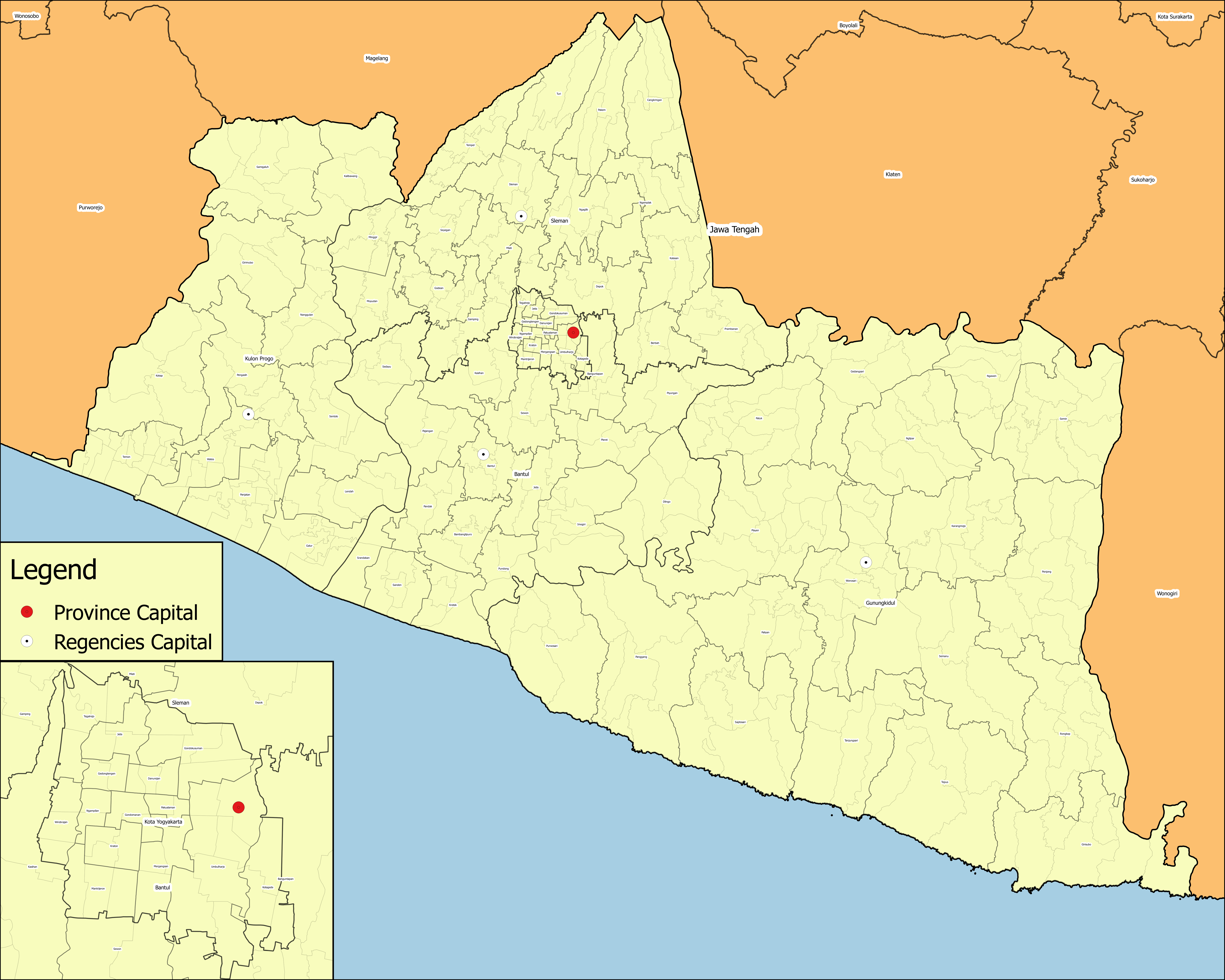
Administrative Map of Yogyakarta Special Region

Located within the Special Region of Yogyakarta, the city of Yogyakarta is known as a center of classical Javanese fine art and culture, such as batik, ballet, drama, music, poetry, and shadow puppetry. It is also one of Indonesia's most renowned centres of higher education. At the city's core is the Sultan's palace, the Kraton. While the city sprawls outward in all directions from the Kraton, the "modern" centre of the city is located to the north.

The Special Region forms one of Indonesia's 84 national electoral districts to elect members to the People's Representative Council. The Yogyakarta S.R. Electoral District consists of all of the 4 regencies in the province, together with the city of Yogyakarta, and elects 8 members to the People's Representative Council.

== Demographics ==
Historical population
Year	Pop.	±%
1971	2,489,360	—
1980	2,750,813	+10.5%
1990	2,913,054	+5.9%
1995	2,916,779	+0.1%
2000	3,122,268	+7.0%
2010	3,457,491	+10.7%
2020	3,668,719	+6.1%
2025	3,781,550	+3.1%
Source: Badan Pusat Statistik (BPS), 2025 and previous

=== Language ===
Aside from Indonesian, Javanese, spoken by the vast majority as their native language in the region, is also designated as the official language of the Special Region of Yogyakarta under Yogyakarta Special Region Regulation Number 2 of 2021.

=== Religion ===
The majority of the population is Muslim, which is (92.62%), the rest are Christians (7.18%), then Buddhists (0.10%), Hindus (0.09%), Confucianists and others (0.01%).

== Infrastructure ==
=== Transport ===
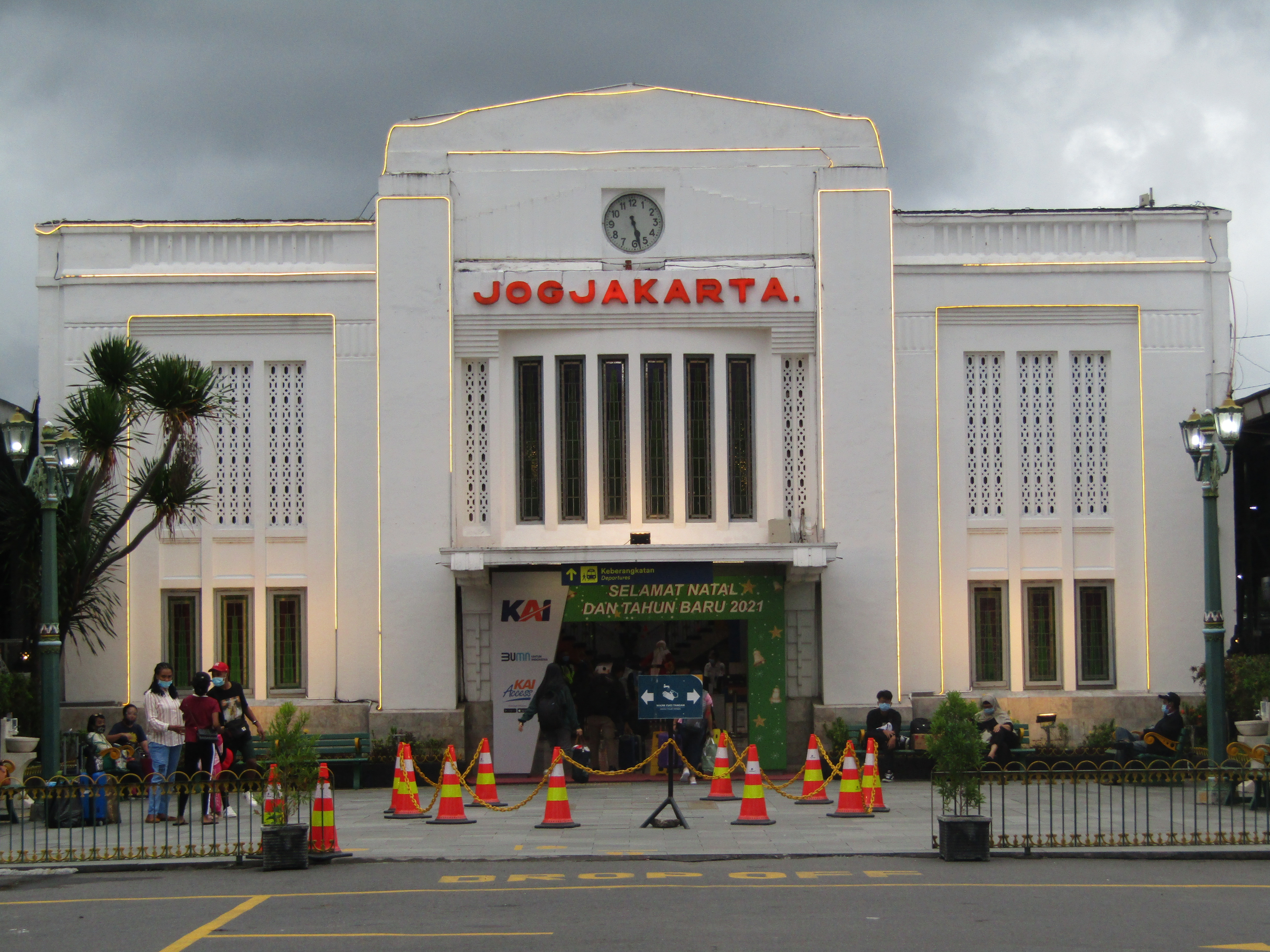
Yogyakarta railway station

Yogyakarta is served by Adisucipto Airport and Yogyakarta International Airport, the latter being opened for minimum operations in late April 2019 and fully operational starting late March 2020. There are two main railway stations: Lempuyangan Station and Yogyakarta railway station, both located in the City of Yogyakarta. Other station providing passenger service is Wates railway station, located in Wates, Kulon Progo, and Maguwo railway station in Depok, Sleman.

Yogyakarta is considered one of the major hubs that link the west–east main railway route in Java island. Yogyakarta Station is the main train station located in the center, and Lempuyangan Station is the second train station in the city. The two stations have their schedule to and from other cities on Java island. The Prambanan Express commuter rail service operates west of Yogyakarta Station across Kulonprogo Regency to Purworejo, and KAI Commuter Yogyakarta Line electric commuter rail system operates from east of the station to Surakarta. To the south, in the Bantul region, is the Giwangan bus station, one of the largest bus stations in Indonesia. The Yogyakarta metropolitan centre is surrounded by a ring road.

In 2008, the government of the Special Region of Yogyakarta launched a bus rapid transit system, the Trans Jogja, which connects places in and around Yogyakarta City, including the airport and the Prambanan temple. Today, Trans Jogja has reached other points in the south side of the city.

== Education ==
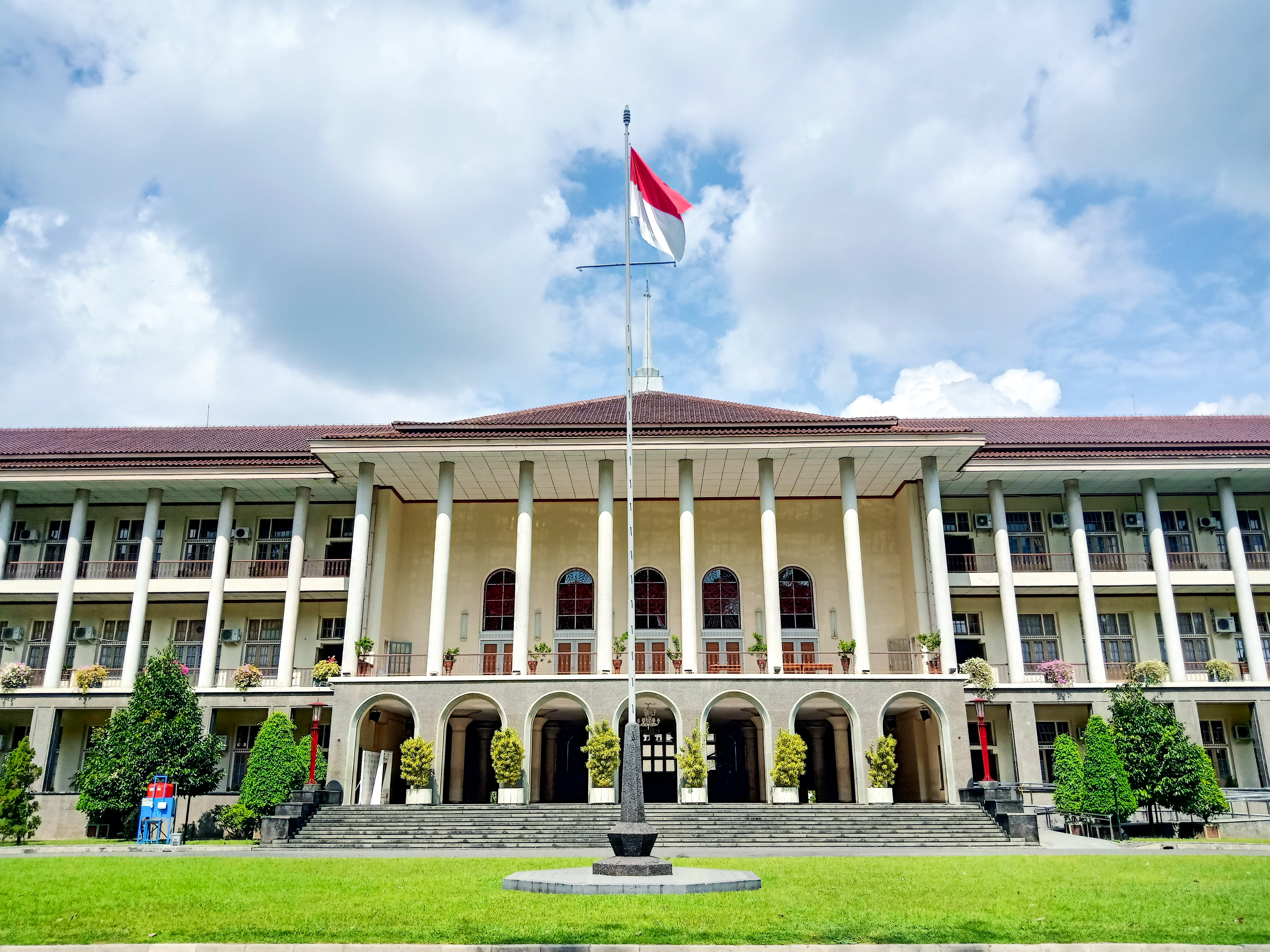
Gadjah Mada University

Yogyakarta is home to more than one hundred institutions of higher education in Indonesia, the highest number of any province in Indonesia, hence its nickname of "Kota Pelajar" ("The City of Students").

Yogyakarta is the home of the first established state university in Indonesia, Gadjah Mada University.

The Special Region is also the home of the first established private university in Indonesia, the Islamic University of Indonesia, which was founded in 1945. The Indonesia Institute of Arts, the first established university in fine arts, is also in the region. Other large universities include Yogyakarta State University, Sunan Kalijaga State Islamic University, Sanata Dharma University, Muhammadiyah University of Yogyakarta, and Atma Jaya University.

== Sister relationships ==
Yogyakarta Special Region has signed a sister province relationship or friendly ties agreement with the region/state:

- Kyoto Prefecture, Japan
- California, United States
- Gyeongsangbuk-do, South Korea
- Tyrol, Austria
- Chiang Mai Province, Thailand

== See also ==
- List of cities in Indonesia
