= Sungai Durian, Solok =

Sungai Durian
- Village
- Location within Indonesia
- Coordinates: 0.834684°S 100.789261°E
- Country: Indonesia
- Province: West Sumatra
- Regency: Solok
- District: IX Koto Sungai Lasi

Population (2010)
  - Total: 662
- Postal code: 27388

Sungai Durian, or "Durian River", is a village in the district of IX Koto Sungai Lasi, Solok Regency in the province of West Sumatra, Indonesia. The village had 662 inhabitants as of the 2010 census.

== Events ==
A barefoot futsal tournament was held in the village in July 2015 between KKN students and local youth, the Sungai Durian Cup. At one point play was almost interrupted by a wandering buffalo. In July 2016, towards the end of Ramadan, a dispute broke out between villagers of Sungai Durian and the neighboring village of Bukit Bais. Police intervened and managed to prevent violence.

In January 2017 two women drowned when they slipped into what was said to be an abandoned open-pit gold mine in the village with a depth of about 4 metres (13 ft). Police would not confirm that the pool was an excavated mine, and said that if it was a mine they did not know when the mining was done. The mine would be illegal under the constitution, but presumably its presence was known by the local people and the police.

== Sources ==
- "Ibu Dan Anak Tenggelam Di Bekas Galian Tambang Emas", Anta-news (in Indonesian), 9 January 2017
- "Kode POS Desa Sungai Durian", kodepos.nomor.net (in Indonesian)
- "Pemuda Bukit Bais dan Sungai Durian Kabupaten Solok Nyaris Cakak Banyak", Harian Haluan (in Indonesian), 6 July 2016
- Population of Indonesia by Village: Result of 2010 Population Census (PDF), Central Bureau of Statistics (BPS - Statistics Indonesia), archived from the original (PDF) on 2015-02-07
- Risko Mardianto (11 January 2017), "Tragedi Sungai Durian, Eksplorasi Alam yang Luput Dari Perhatian Aparat", Portal Berita Editor
- "Sungai Durian Cup, Duel Pemuda dan Mahasiswa KKN", Genta Andalas (in Indonesian), 26 July 2015
