= Arosuka =

Town in Indonesia

Coordinates: 0°57′S 100°37′E

Arosuka is a town and government seat of Solok Regency, of West Sumatra province of Indonesia, specifically the Gunung Talang District. Aroska serves as a focal point for regional administration, infrastructure development, and a growing eco-tourism in Indonesia

The Solok Regency is noted for its natural structures which have attracted tourists to the area.

== Geography & Climate ==
Arosuka is situated in the Highlands of Indonesia (Bukit Barisan). The elevation averages around 1,150 metres but ranges up to 2,373 metres (7,785ft). Because of its high altitude, Arosuka is much cooler then the majority of Sumatra.

== Tourism & Landmarks ==
If you want to go here you gotta go to Solok Regency tourism networks

Mont Talang: There are thousands of hikers here, and there is a stratovolcano.

Arosuka Park is a public recreational area with scenic views.

Traditional Buildings: So basically the only thing here traditional is their apartment complexes that uses Rumah Gadang

== Governance ==
Arosuka became the capital city to make ruling the large Solok Regency easier. The big Regency covers 3,738 square kilometres, and had an estimated population of 419,031 in mid 2025. The town holds the main government offices, the local parliament, and the planning departments.
