= Padang metropolitan area =

Padang metropolitan area Palapa
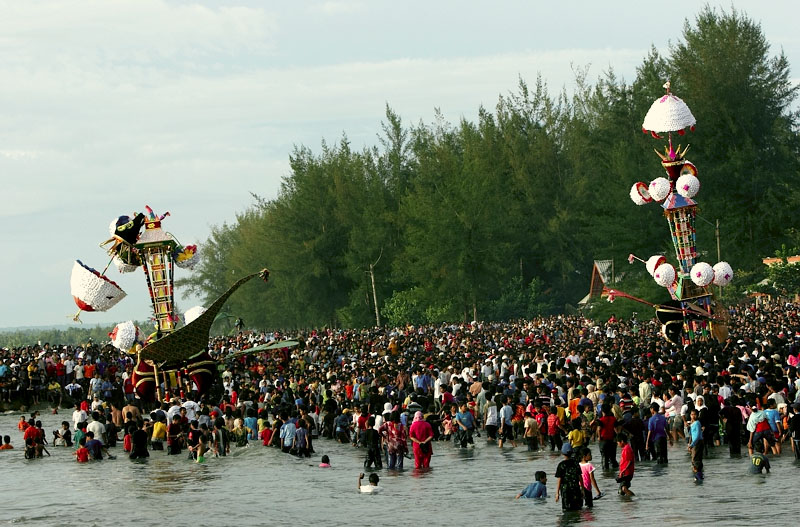
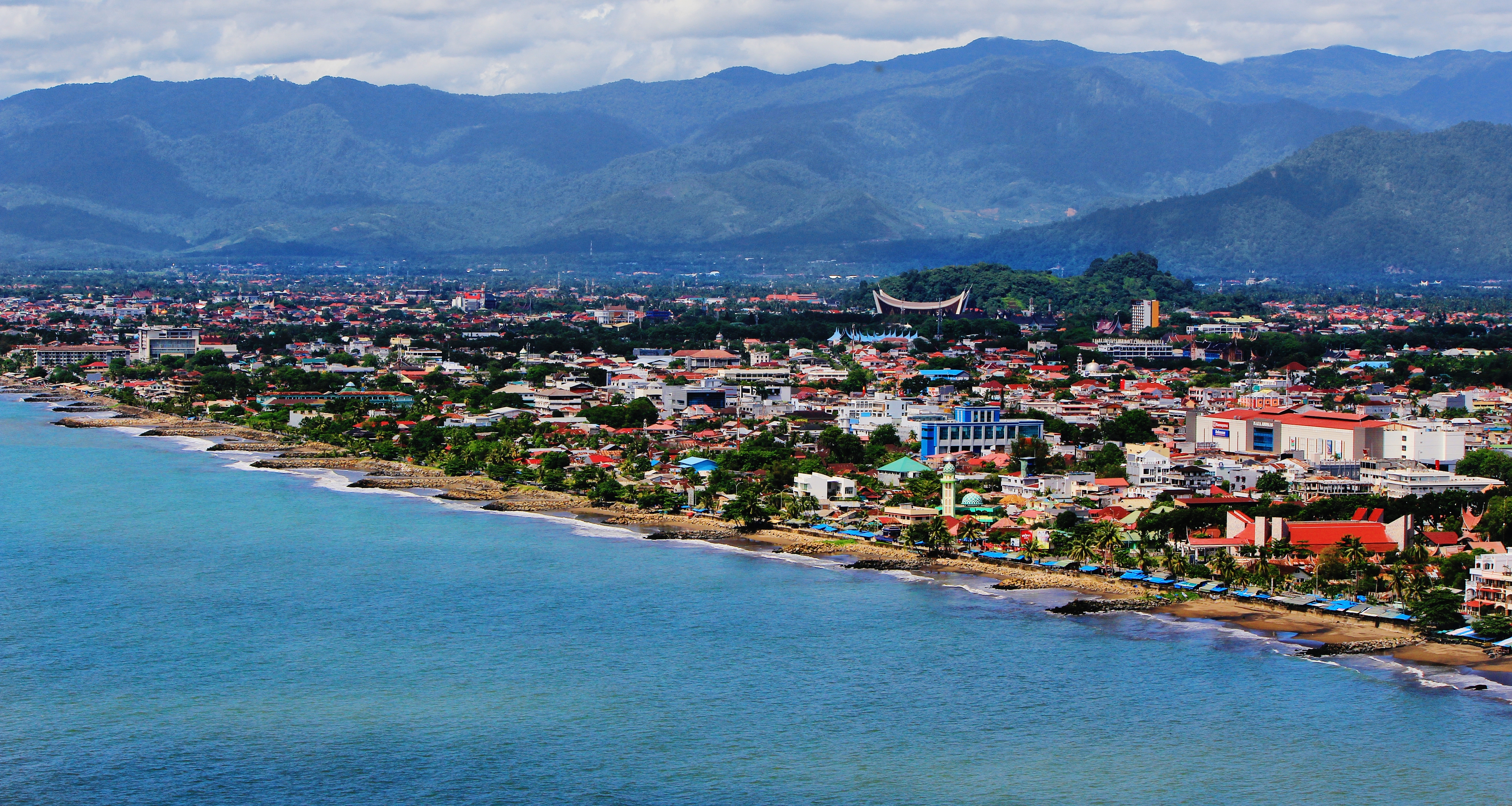
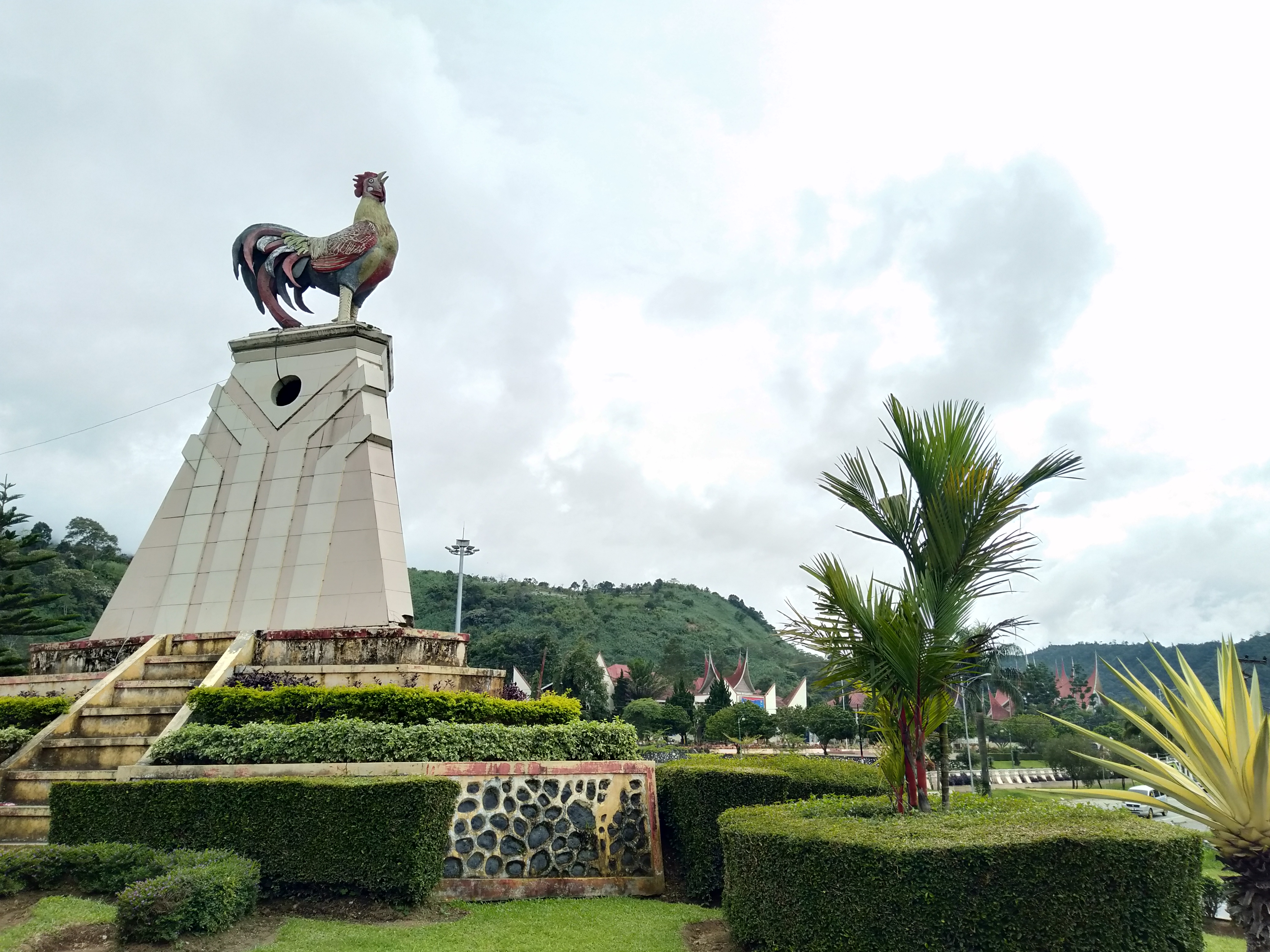
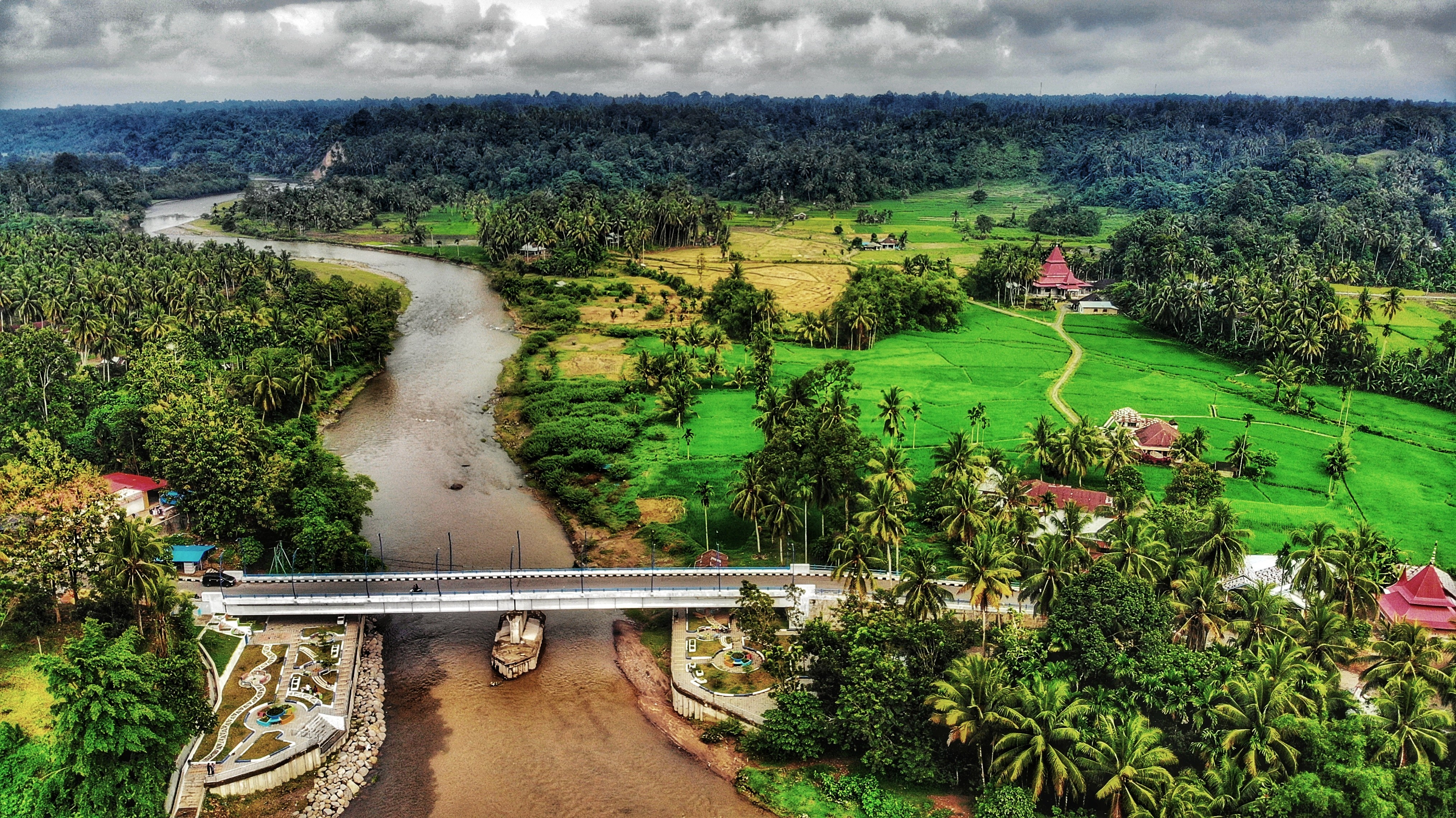
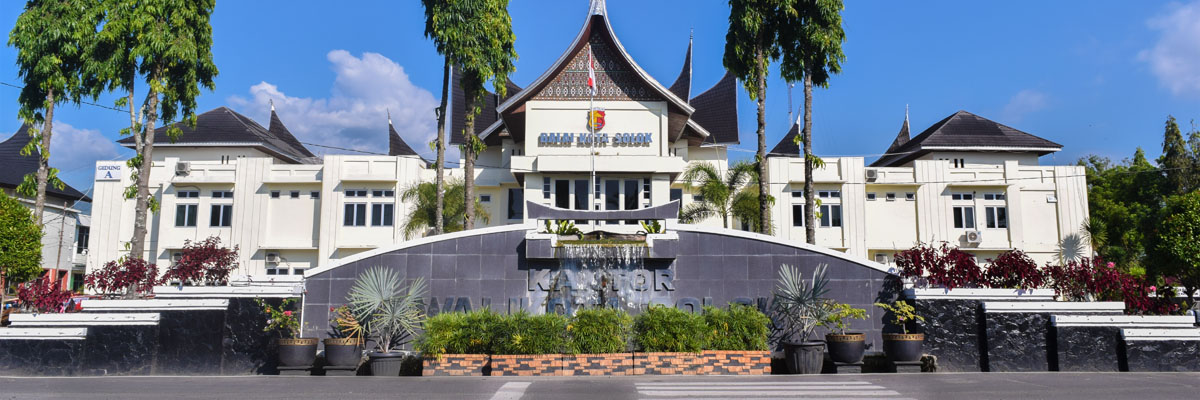
- From top, left to right: West Sumatra grand mosque, Tabuik Festival in Pariaman city, View Padang city, Statue in Solok Regency, View Padang Pariaman Regency, Solok city townhall
- Interactive map of Padang metropolitan area
- Coordinates: 0°57′0″S 100°21′11″E
- Country: Indonesia
- Province: West Sumatra
- Core city: Padang
- Satellite city: Pariaman; Solok
- Regencies: Padang Pariaman Regency; Solok Regency (part)

Area
  - Metro: 3,206.85 km^{2} (1,238.17 sq mi)

Population (mid 2023 estimate)
  - Metro: 1,752,482
  - Metro density: 546.481/km^{2} (1,415.38/sq mi)
- Time zone: UTC+7 (Indonesia Western Time)
- GDP metro: 2023
- Total: ▲Rp 124.003 trillion ▲US$ 8.136 billion ▲US$ 26.056 billion (PPP)
- Per capita: ▲Rp 71.036 million ▲US$ 4,660 ▲US$ 14,926 (PPP)

Padang metropolitan area or officially Palapa; (acronym of "Padang-Lubuk Alung/Padang Pariaman-Pariaman") is a metropolitan area located in Indonesia. This area includes Padang city and its surrounding areas such as Padang city, Pariaman city, Padang Pariaman Regency with later include Solok city and Solok Regency (part) due to increase mobility between area. This region of West Sumatra province, officially the biggest city in Sumatra island directly facing Indian Ocean. Padang city also host First Summit Indian Ocean Rim Association in 2017 (co-host with Jakarta). It has an area of 3,206.85 km^{2}, and at the 2023 estimate had a population of 1,752,482

== Definition ==
The national government regards the Padang Metropolitan Area as including Padang city, Pariaman city, Padang Pariaman Regency, Solok city and Solok Regency (part). This area is on the international trade route and is directly adjacent to Indian Ocean. In the region to boost investment growth.

== Demographics ==
| Administrative Region | Area (km^{2}) | Pop'n 2020 Census | Pop'n 2023 estimate | Density (per km^{2}) 2023 |
|---|---|---|---|---|
| Padang | 694.96 | 909,040 | 942,942 | 1,356.8 |
| Pariaman | 73.36 | 94,224 | 97,204 | 1,325.1 |
| Solok | 58.72 | 73,438 | 77,840 | 1,325,6 |
| Padang Pariaman Regency | 1,343.09 | 430,626 | 451,388 | 336.1 |
| Solok Regency (Part) | 1,036.72 | 176,299 | 183,108 | 176.6 |
| Palapa | 3,206.85 | 1,683,627 | 1,752,482 | 565.5 |

== Geography ==
Padang and Pariaman is a coastal city with island and bays, islets, and peninsulas, located western part of Sumatra Island, eastern part of Indian Ocean. The Mentawai Strait separates Sumatra and Mentawai. While Solok city is hinterland Minangkabau with a height of 390 m above sea level.

== Tourism ==
Over 10 million domestic tourists visited in 2023. Padang is famous for culinary tourism, especially the famous Padang Food who spread out to Maritime Southeast Asia to Malaysia, Singapore, Brunei and other part of Indonesia. Padang also widely known for its Minangkabau culture, and sunset beaches. Padang become gateway to other famous destinations in West Sumatra such as Bukittinggi, Jam Gadang, Lembah Harau, Mentawai island. International tourists mostly coming from Malaysia, Singapore and Australia.

== Infrastructure ==
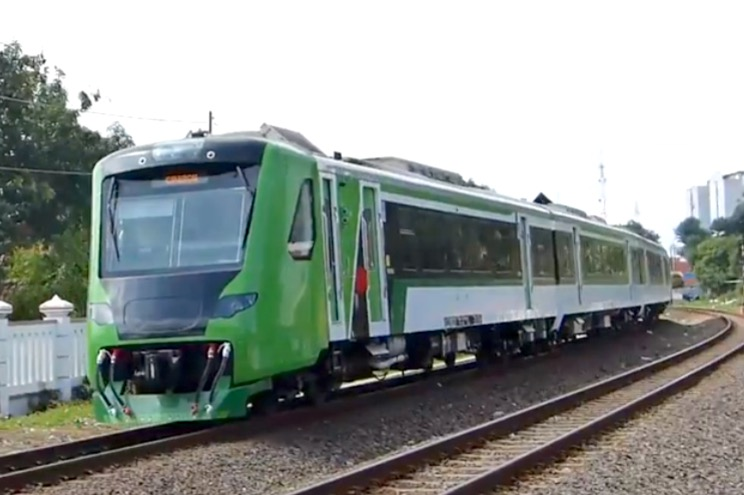
Trial Minangkabau express

Trans Padang is the most reliable and the cheapest public transportation in Padang. It began to operate in February 2014.The price for one ride is Rp1,500 for students and Rp3,500 for the public. Trans Padang operates from 06:00 to 19:00.

Minangkabau Express is an airport rail link service. This line was built to cut travel time from Padang city centre to the Minangkabau International Airport in Padang Pariaman Regency, as roads connecting the airport and the city center are frequently affected by traffic congestion.

The Minangkabau Express is the third airport rail link in Indonesia after Kualanamu ARS and Soekarno–Hatta ARS. It was inaugurated by President Joko Widodo on 21 May 2018.

== See also ==
- List of metropolitan areas in Indonesia
- Medan metropolitan area
- Batam metropolitan area
- Palembang metropolitan area
