= Medan metropolitan area =

Medan metropolitan area Mebidangro
- Metropolitan area
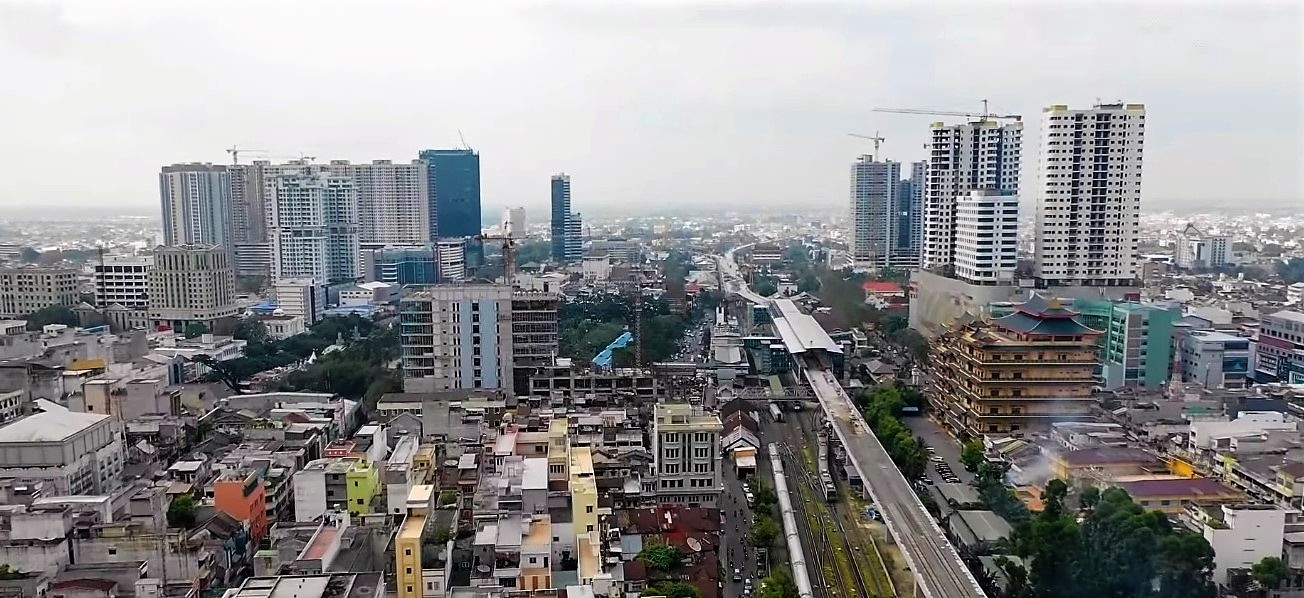
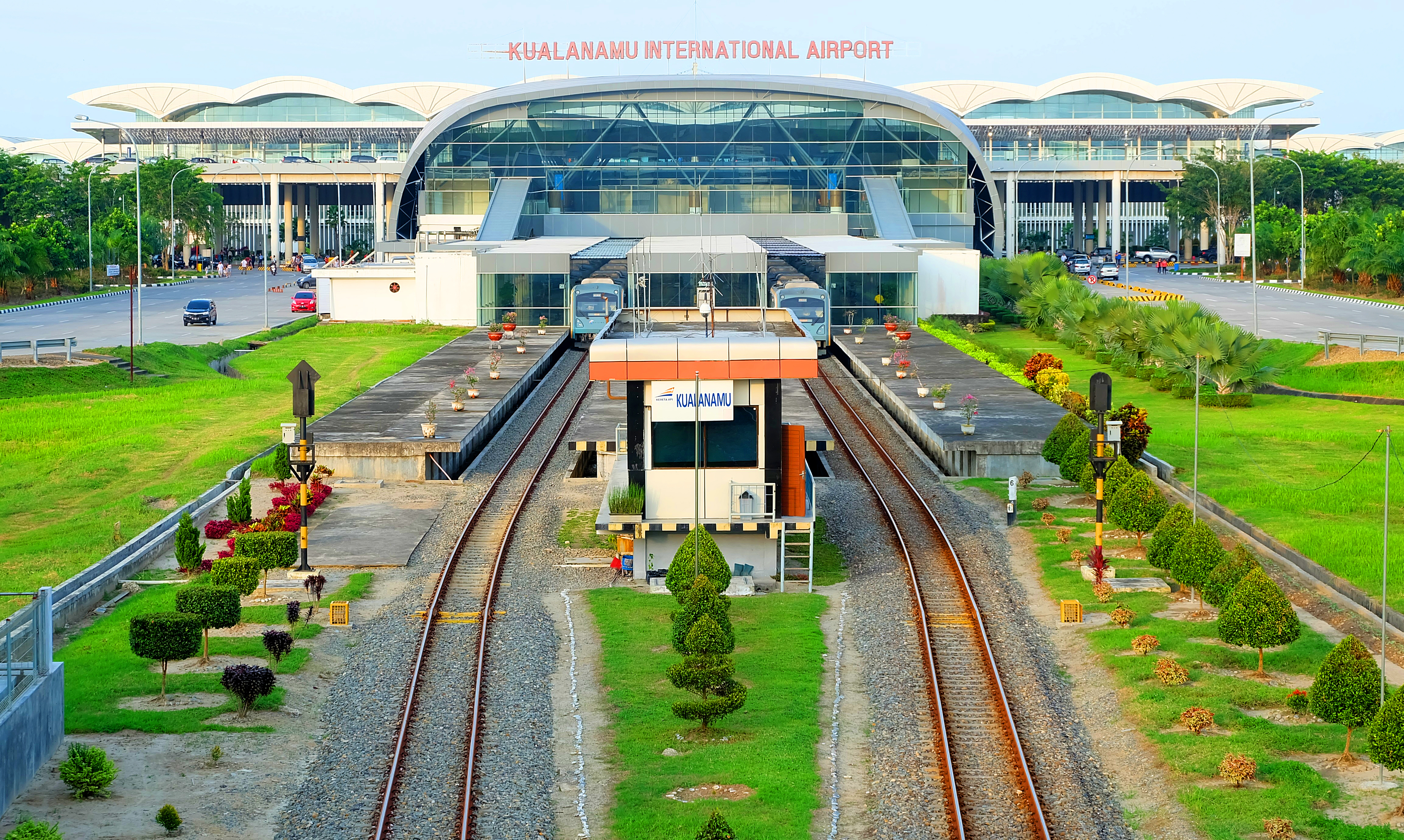
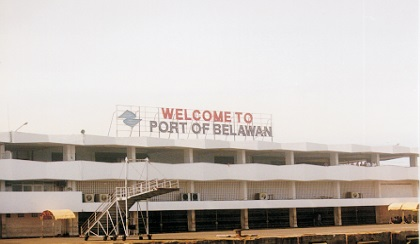
- From top, left to right: Medan skyline, Kualanamu International Airport in Deli Serdang Regency, Port of Belawan in Medan.
- Interactive map of Medan metropolitan area
- Coordinates: 3°35′25″N 98°40′43″E
- Country: Indonesia
- Province: North Sumatra
- Core city: Medan
- Satellite city: Binjai
- Regencies: Deli Serdang Regency; Karo Regency

Area
  - Metro: 3,189.25 km^{2} (1,231.38 sq mi)

Population (mid 2022 estimate)
  - Urban: 4,748,507
  - Metro: 4,848,885
  - Metro density: 1,520.38/km^{2} (3,937.78/sq mi)
- Time zone: UTC+7 (Indonesia Western Time)
- Postcodes: 20xxx, 221xx
- Area codes: (62)61, (62)628
- Vehicle sign: BK
- GDP (nominal): 2023
- Total: ▲Rp 483.278 trillion ▲US$ 31.706 billion ▲US$ 101.544 billion (PPP)
- Per capita: ▲Rp 92.645 million ▲US$ 6,078 ▲US$ 19,466 (PPP)
- Highest elevation 2,460 m/8,070 ft (Mount Sinabung, in Karo Regency)

The Greater Medan metropolitan area, known locally as Mebidangro (an acronym of Medan–Binjai–Deli Serdang–Karo) is a metropolitan area in North Sumatra, Indonesia, which consists of Medan City, Binjai City, Deli Serdang Regency and part (4 districts) of Karo Regency. The metropolitan area was established by a presidential decree in 2011. It is a leading economic centre in western Indonesia, especially for provinces of Aceh, North Sumatra, West Sumatra and Riau. The metropolitan area also serves as a hub for western Indonesia.

== Demography ==
Administrative division	Area in km^{2}	Pop'n Census 2010	Pop'n Census 2020	Pop'n Estimate mid 2024	Pop'n density 2024 (/km^{2})	Ref
Medan (City)	281.99	2,097,610	2,435,252	2,486.283	8,817	
Binjai (City)	90.45	246,154	291,842	307,170	3,396	
Deli Serdang Regency	2,497.72	1,790,431	1,931,441	2,048,480	820	
Karo Regency (part)	224.69	86,244	98,328	103,046	459	
Greater Medan	3,094.85	4,220,439	4,756,863	4,944,979	1,598	

The four districts of Karo Regency within the metropolitan area are Merdaka, Berastagi, Dolat Rayat and Barusjahe.

== See also ==
- List of metropolitan areas in Indonesia
- Jakarta metropolitan area
- Batam metropolitan area
- Padang metropolitan area
- Palembang metropolitan area
