= IX Koto Sungai Lasi =

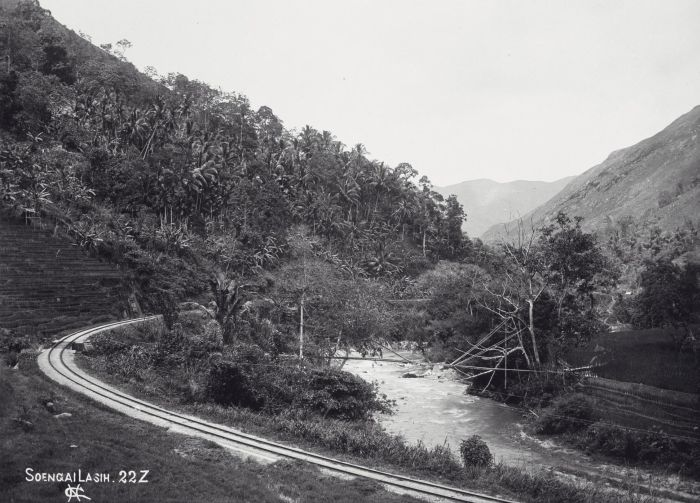
Early 20th-century view

Sungai Lasi, known as Soengailasi when it was part of the Dutch East Indies, is a district in the Solok Regency of West Sumatra, Indonesia.

The area is known for its fruit including durian, mangosteen, rambutan, duku, and Rambai in the hills around the villages of Pianggu and Taruang-Taruang.

There is a popular weekly market, Lasi River Market (Pasar Sungai Lasi), on Wednesdays. The area is largely agricultural with rice paddies and fields. There are also mineral deposits, especially iron ore. The Sungai Lasi and Batang Pamo rivers are in the hilly area. Flooding can be problematic. The area includes mixed dipterocarp lowland rainforest.

The district includes 9 villages:

- Bukik Baih
- Guguak Sarai
- Indudua
- Koto Laweh
- Pianggu
- Siaro-Aro
- Sungai Durian
- Sungai Jambua
- Taruang-taruang

== Gallery ==
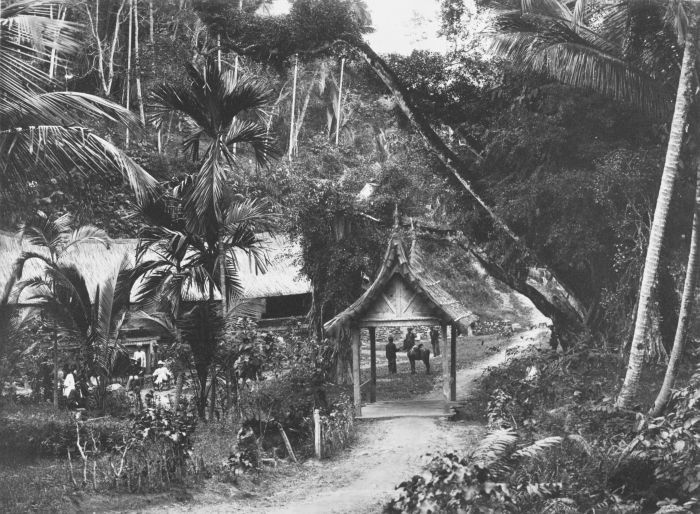
A scene in Soengailasi around the start of the 20th century by Christiaan Benjamin Nieuwenhuis

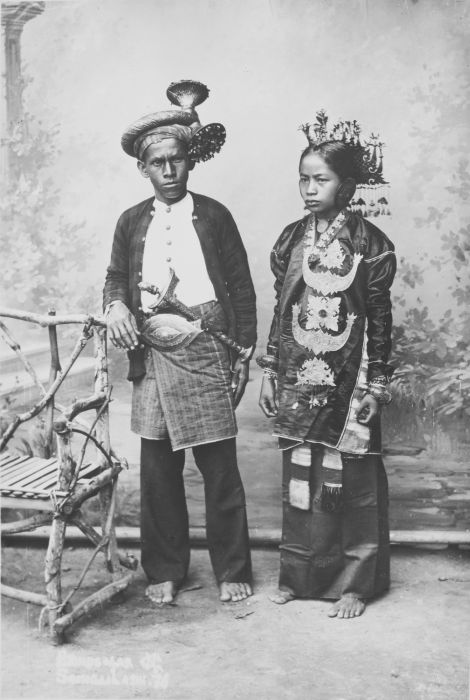
Photo of a bride and groom (dated 1892-1905) by Christiaan Benjamin Nieuwenhuis

== See also ==
- Kerinci Seblat National Park
