= Solok Regency =

Regency in West Sumatra, Indonesia

Solok Regency Kabupaten Solok
- Regency
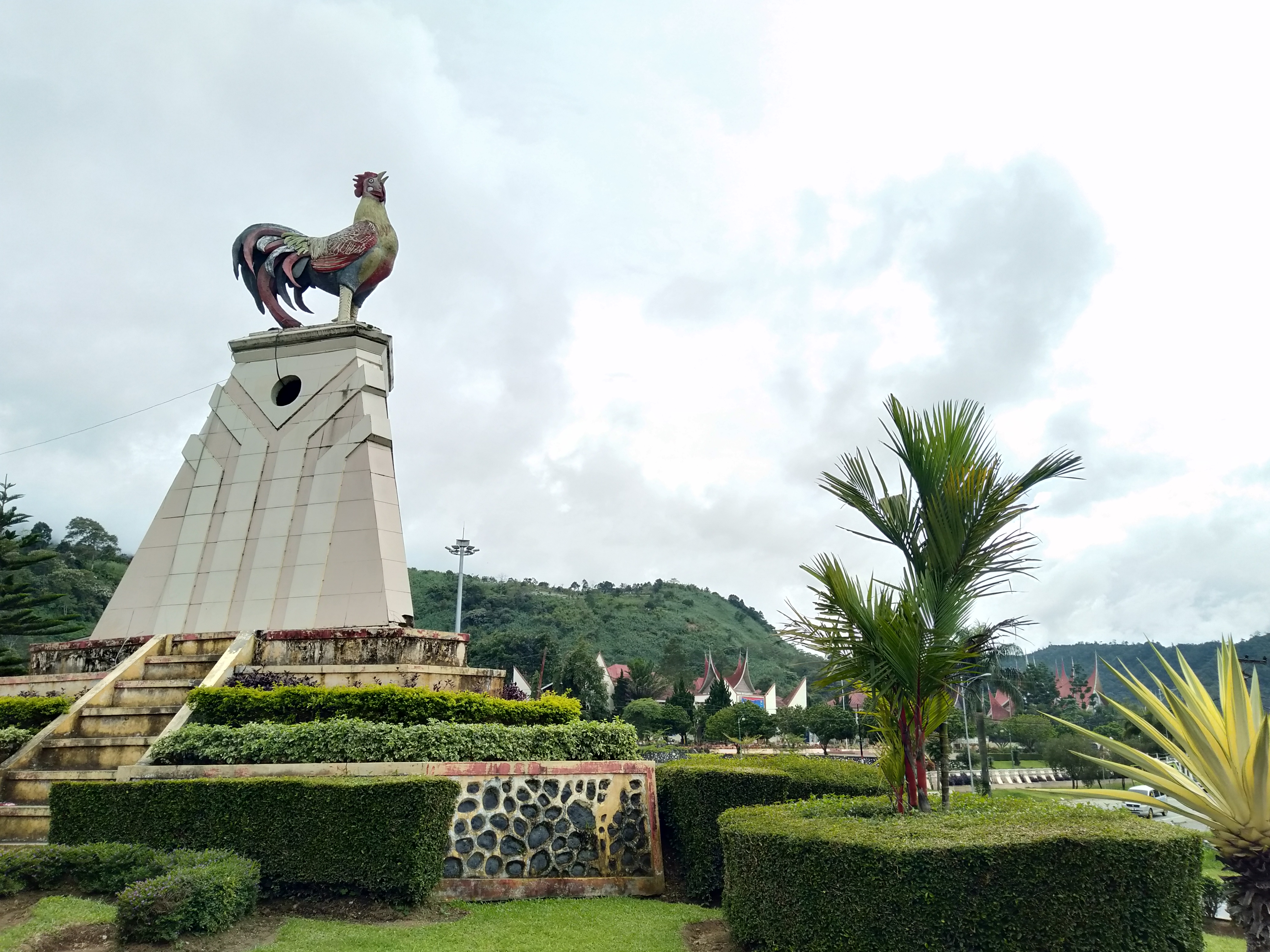
- Ayam kukuak balenggek statue in Arosuka

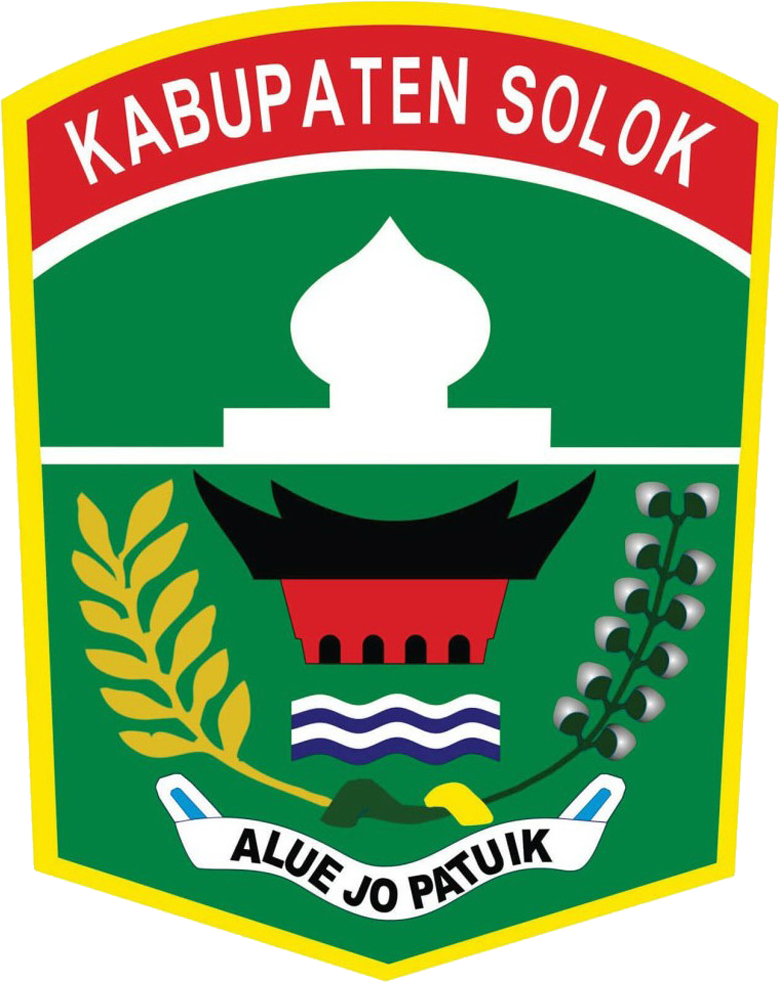
- Coat of arms
- Motto: Alue Jo Patuik (Put the thing on its place)
- Location within West Sumatra

- Location in Sumatra and Indonesia Solok Regency (Indonesia)
- Coordinates: 0.96667°S 100.81667°E
- Country: Indonesia
- Province: West Sumatra
- Regency seat: Arosuka

Government
  - Regent: Jon Firman Pandu
  - Vice Regent: Candra

Area
  - Total: 3,738.0 km^{2} (1,443.2 sq mi)

Population (mid 2025 estimate)
  - Total: 419,031
  - Density: 112.10/km^{2} (290.34/sq mi)
- Time zone: UTC+7 (IWST)
- Area code: (+62) 755
- Website: solokkab.go.id

Solok Regency (Indonesian: Kabupaten Solok; pronounced [kabuˌpat̪ɛn ˈsɔlɔʔ]) is an inland regency (kabupaten) of West Sumatra, Indonesia. It covers an area of 3,738 km^{2} and had a population of 348,566 at the 2010 Census and 391,497 at the 2020 Census; the official estimate as of mid 2025 was 419,031 (comprising 210,160 males and 208,871 females). The administrative centre of the regency is the town of Arosuka, in Gunung Talang District. The city of Solok is administratively separate from the Regency (although almost totally enclaved geographically within the Regency) and its area and population are not included in these totals.

== Administrative districts ==
Solok Regency is divided into fourteen districts (kecamatan), listed below with their areas and their populations at the 2010 Census and 2020 Census, together with the official estimates as of mid 2025. The table also includes the locations of the district administrative centres, the number of villages (nagari) in each district, and its postal code.

Name of District (kecamatan)	Area in km^{2}	Pop'n 2010 Census	Pop'n 2020 Census	Pop'n mid 2025 Estimate	Admin centre	No. of villages	Post code
Pantai Cermin	366.00	20,337	22,281	24,714	Surian	2	27373
Lembah Gumanti	459.72	53,178	61,276	69,170	Alahan Panjang	4	27371
Hiliran Gumanti	263.28	16,053	18,338	19,818	Talang Babungo	3	27372
Payung Sekaki	364.50	8,027	9,069	9,786	Sirukam	3	27387
Tigo Lurah	602.50	9,574	10,887	11,413	Batu Bajanjang	5	27374
Lembang Jaya	99.90	25,752	29,787	32,404	Bukik Sileh	6	27384
Danau Kembar	79.10	18,853	22,426	24,454	Simpang Tanjung Nan IV	2	27383
Gunung Talang	385.00	46,738	53,376	57,432	Talang	8	27365
Bukit Sundi	109.00	22,827	25,943	28,112	Muaro Paneh	5	27381
IX Koto Sungai Lasi	171.00	9,671	10,595	10,907	Sungai Lasi	9	27388
Kubung	192.00	55,303	61,647	62,546	Koto Baru	8	27361
X Koto Diatas	257.00	18,461	19,154	19,384	Sulit Air	9	27355
X Koto Singkarak	295.00	31,686	33,690	35,332	Singkarak	8	27356
Junjung Sirih	102.50	12,106	13,028	13,559	Paninggahan	2	27389
Totals	3,738.00	348,566	391,497	419,031	Arosuka	74	

The five kecamatan (districts) of Gunung Talang, Kubung, X Koto Diatas, X Koto Singkarak and Junjung Sirih, all in the west of the regency, are included within the official Padang metropolitan area (as also is Solok city).

== Tourism ==
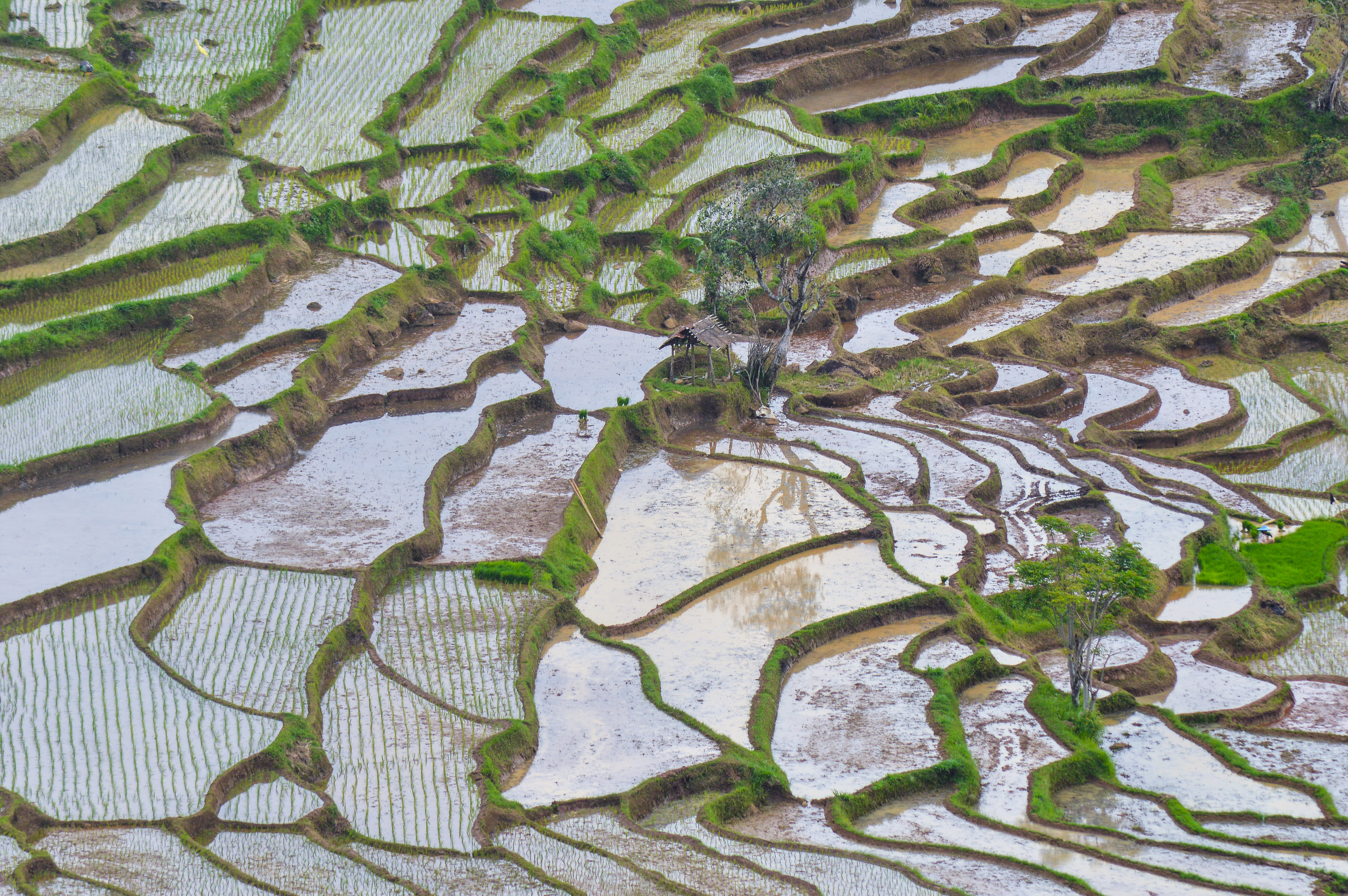
Rice terraces in Kinari

Besides mining, Solok Regency also has tourist attractions such as Mount Red and White (Gunung Merah Putih) in Nagari Sulit Air, with three waterfalls close to each other. Jonjang Seribu (The Thousand Step Staircase) is another natural attraction.

Solok Regency has two lakes, separated by only 300 metres of land between them, so people call them the Twin Lakes. The upper lake is named as Danau Dibawah and the lower lake is named as Danau Diateh. A much larger lake, Danau Singkarak, lies further north across the boundary between Solok Regency and Tanah Datar Regency.

== Settlements ==
- Solok
- Alahan Panjang
