= Batam metropolitan area =

Batam metropolitan area Batam Raya
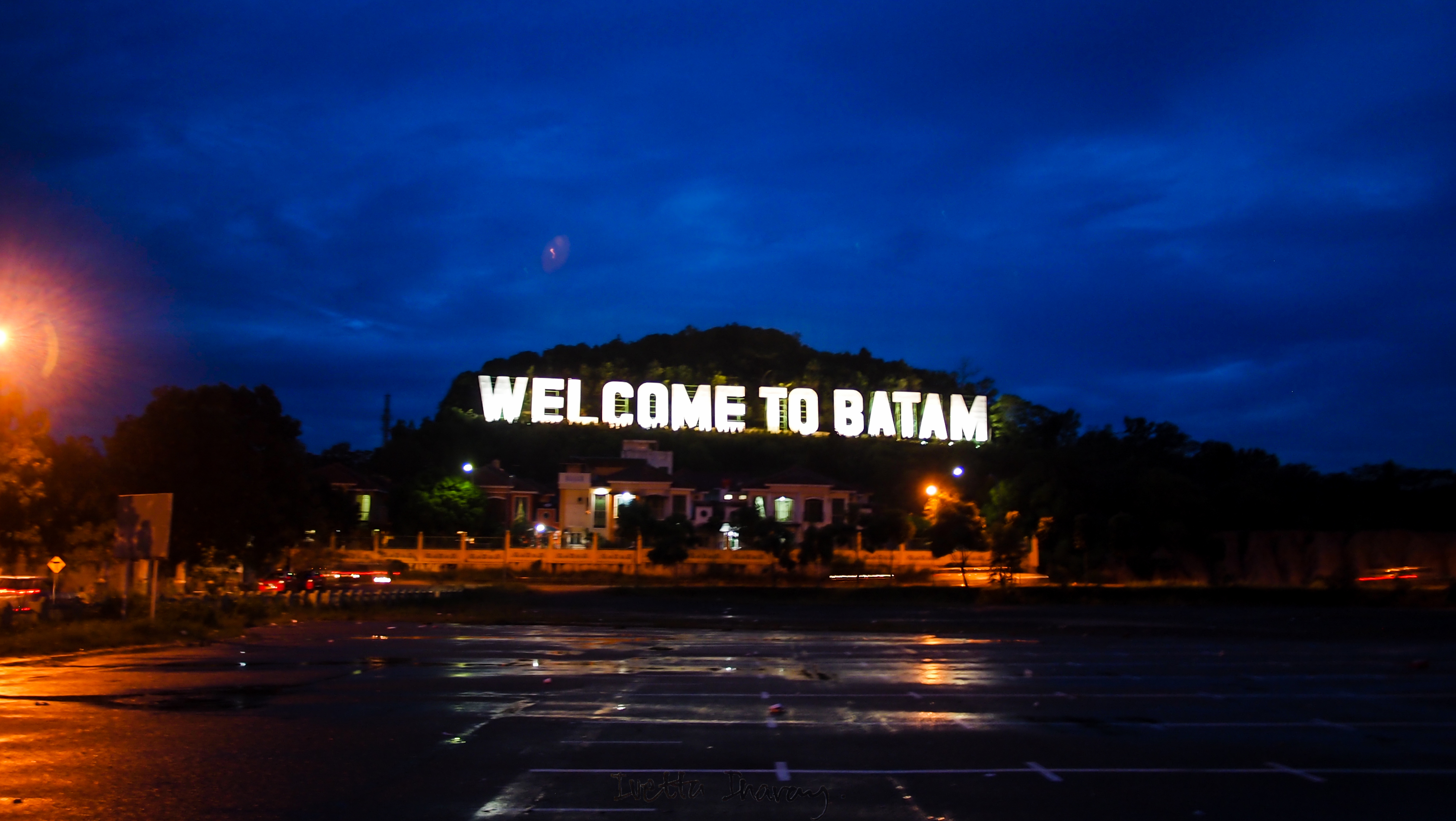
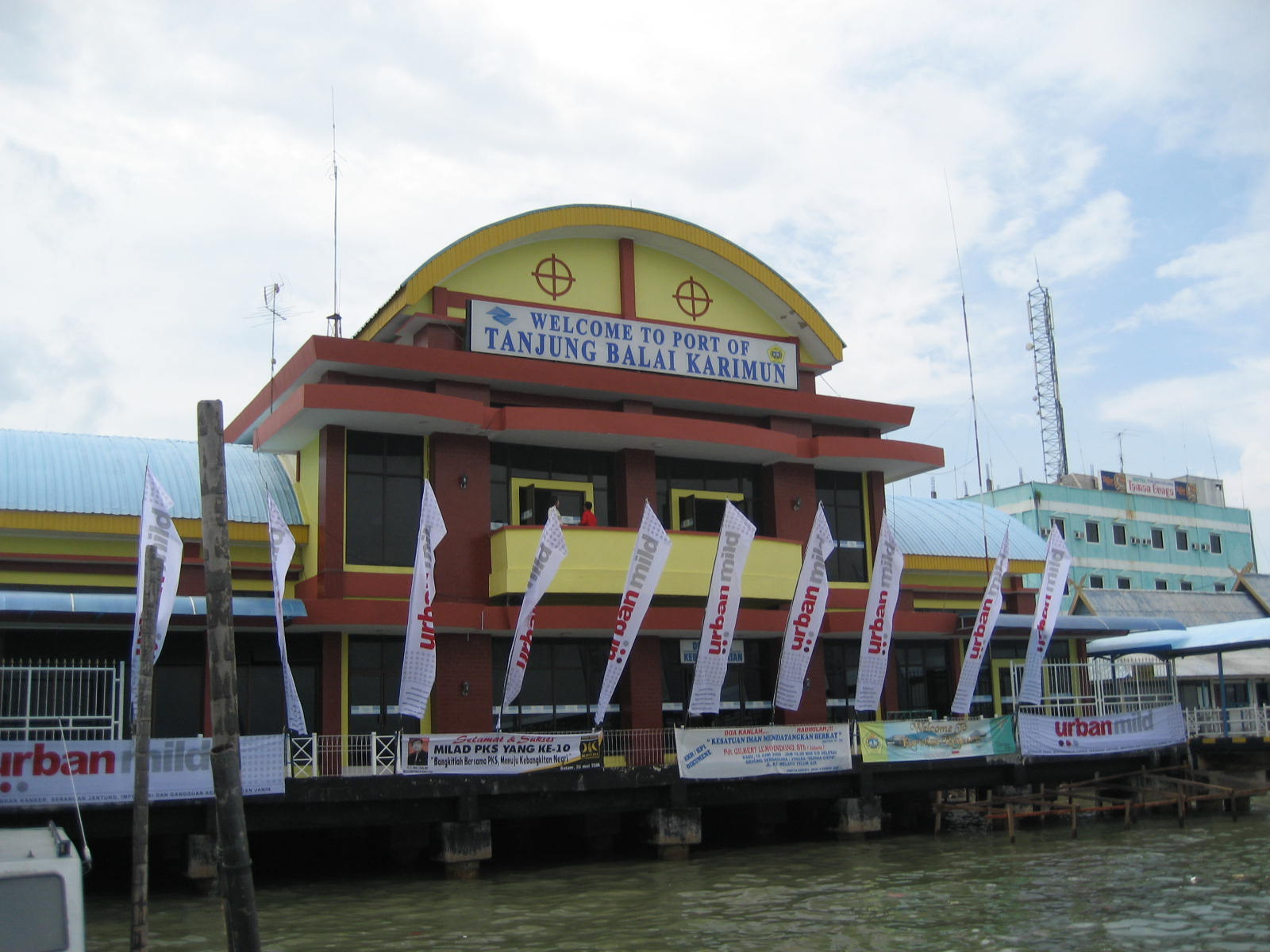
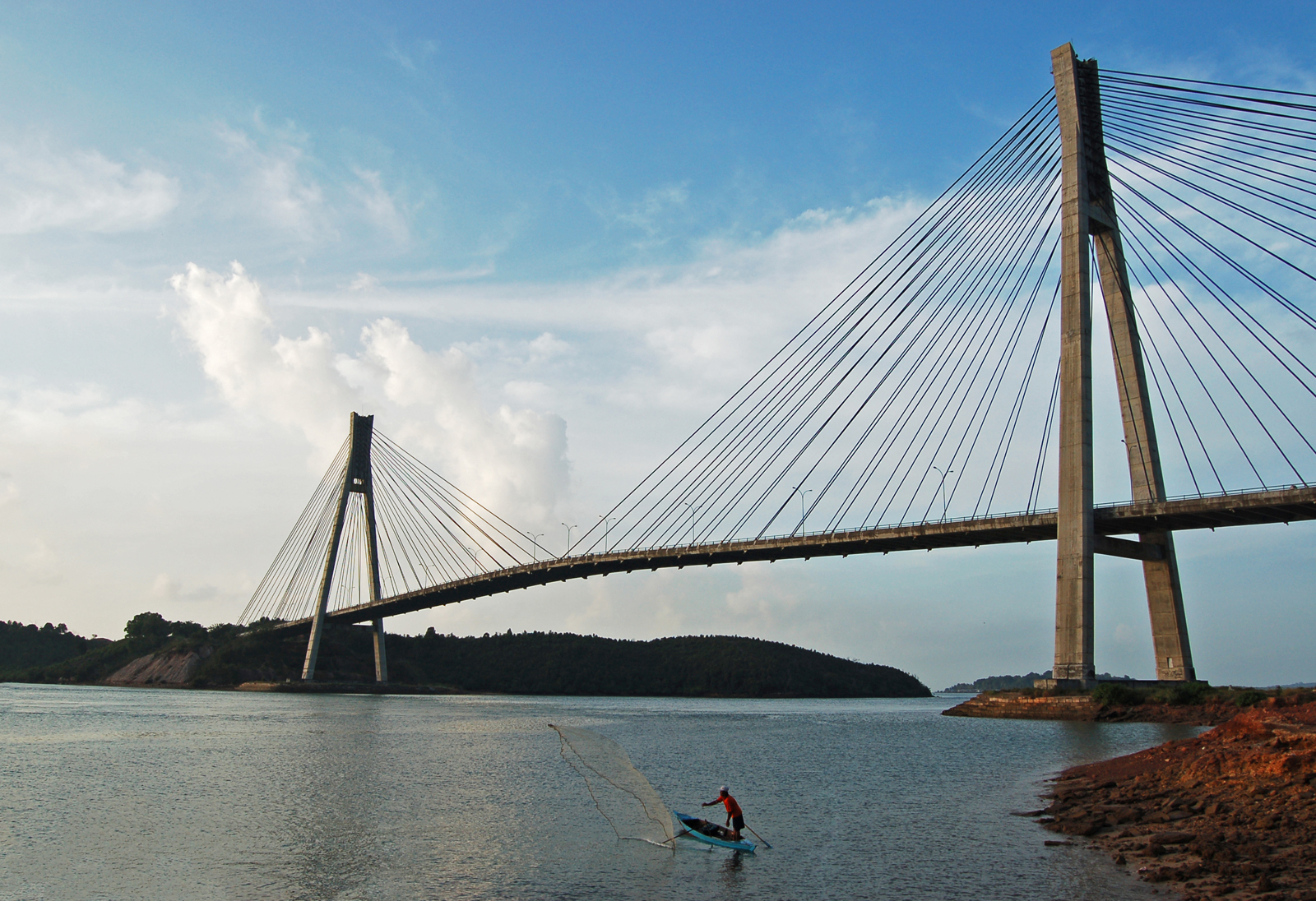
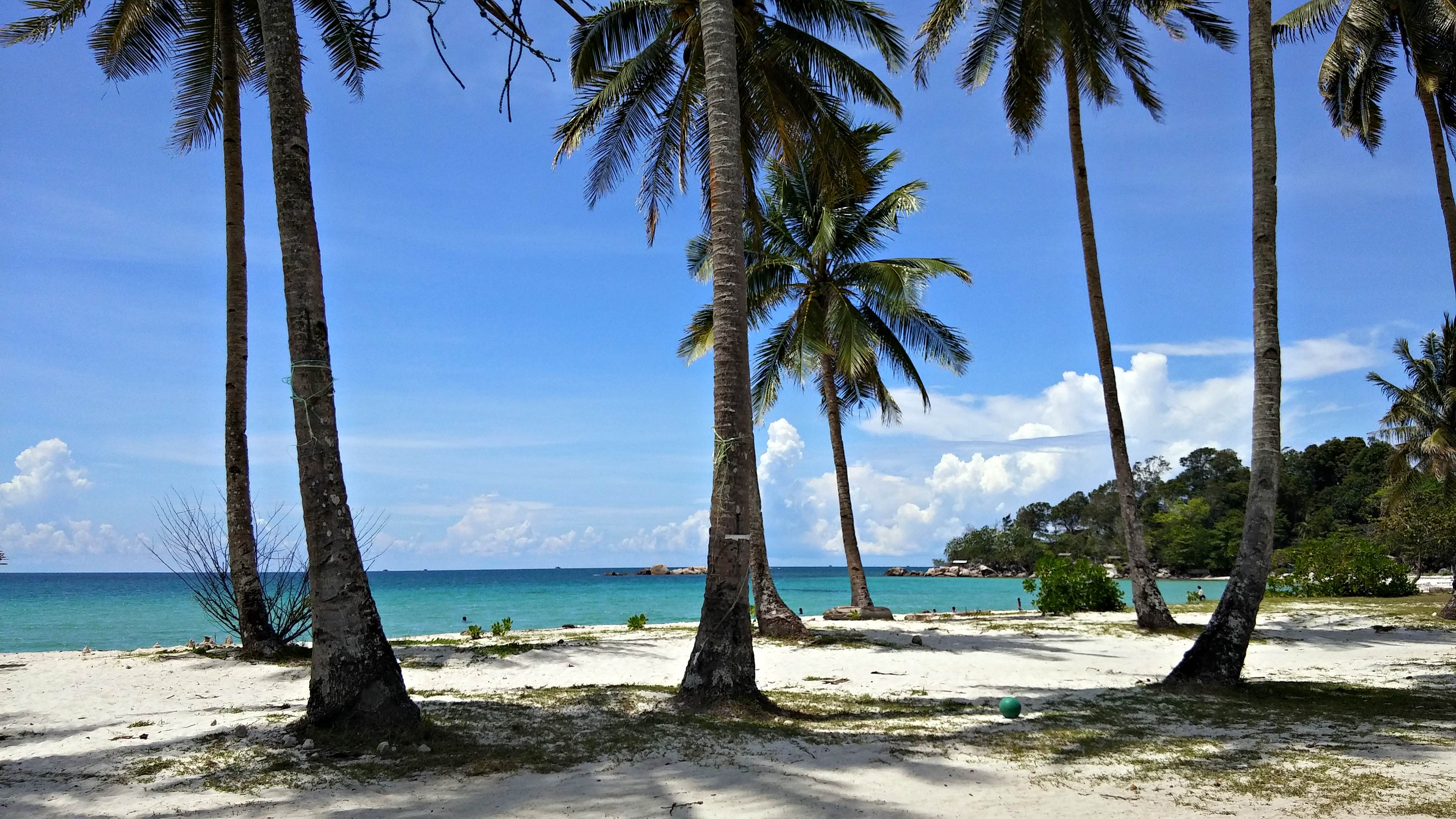
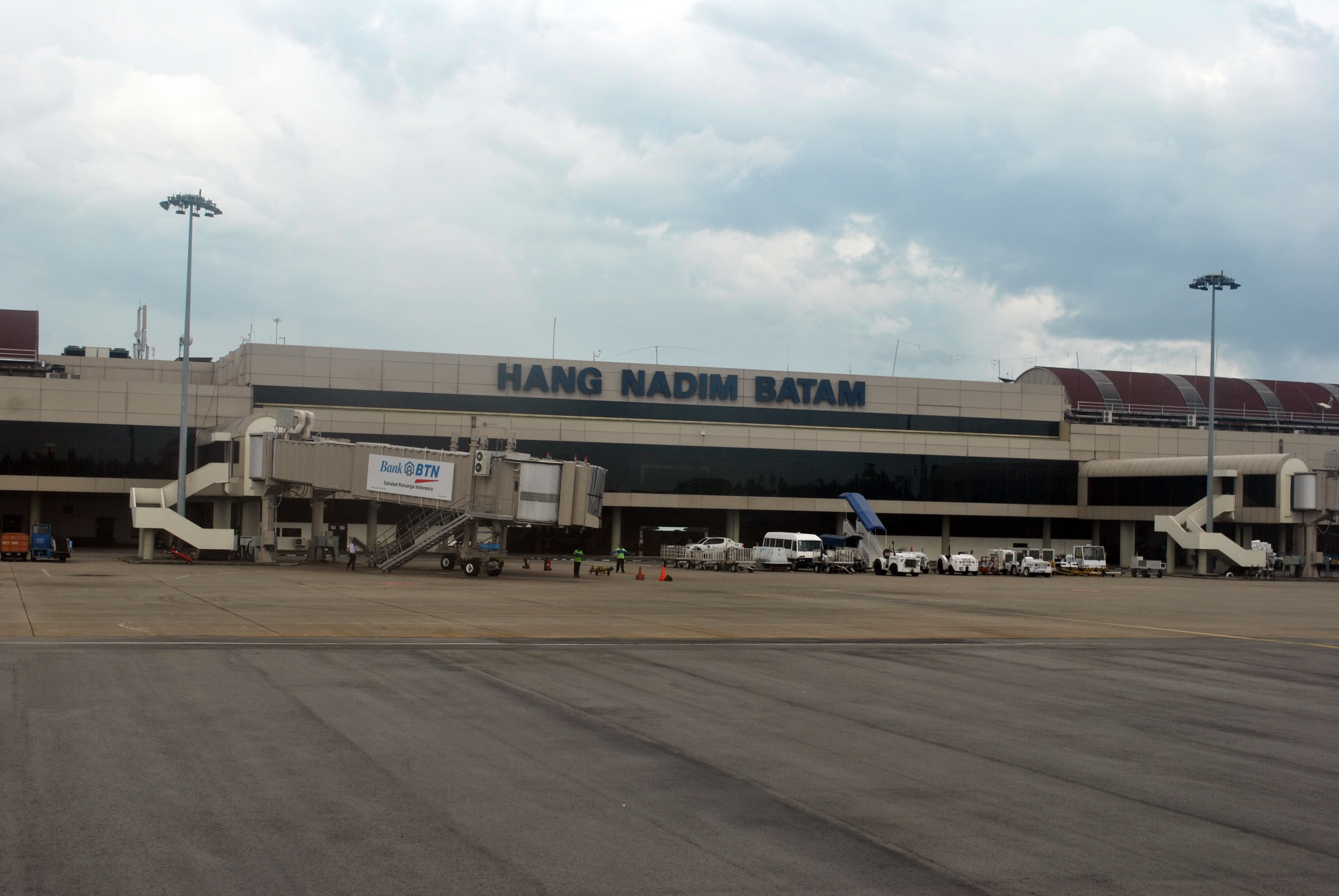
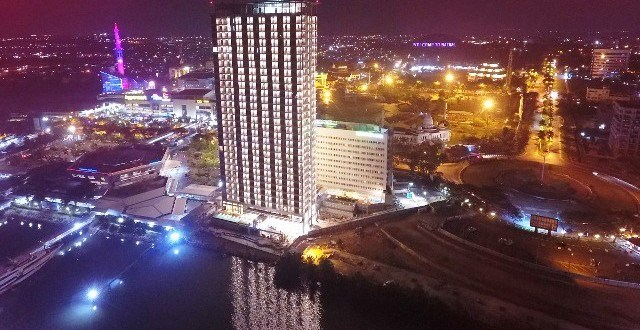
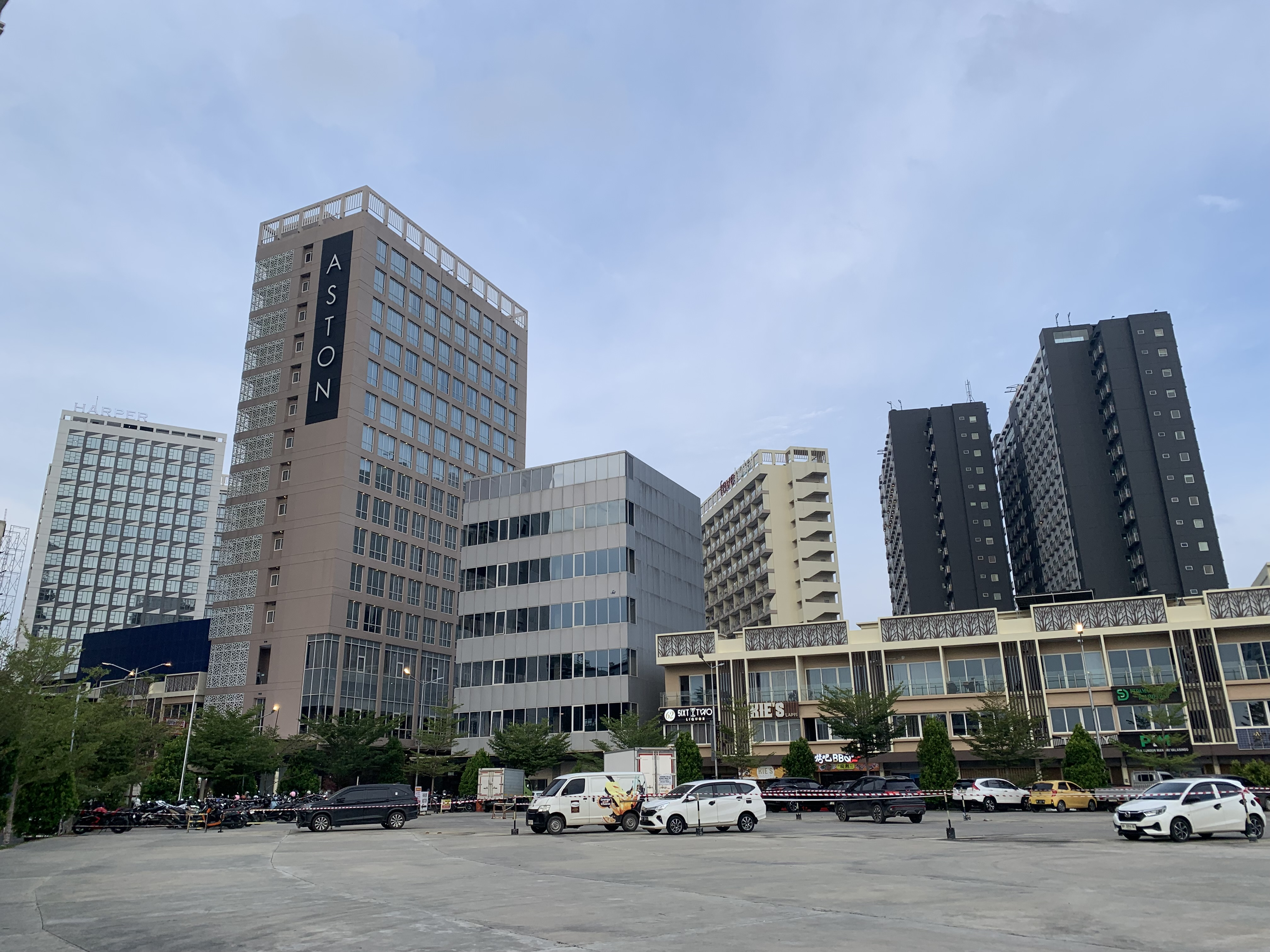
- From top, left to right: Welcome to Batam signage, Tanjung Balai Karimun Regency Port, Barelang Bridge, Trikora Beach Bintan, Hang Nadim International Airport, One Residence Apartment, Downtown of Nagoya Batam
- Country: Indonesia
- Province: Riau Islands
- Core city: Batam
- Satellite city: Tanjung Pinang
- Regencies: Bintan Regency; Karimun Regency

Area
  - Metro: 3,432.7 km^{2} (1,325.4 sq mi)

Population (mid 2023 estimate)
  - Urban: 1,403,000
  - Metro: 1,941,225
  - Metro density: 565.51/km^{2} (1,464.7/sq mi)
- Time zone: UTC+7 (Indonesia Western Time)
- GDP metro: 2023
- Total: ▲Rp 281.732 trillion ▲US$ 18.484 billion ▲US$ 59.196 billion (PPP)
- Per capita: ▲Rp 146.892 million ▲US$ 9,637 ▲US$ 30,864 (PPP)

Batam metropolitan area, or officially known as Batam Raya, is a metropolitan area located in Indonesia. This area includes Batam city and its surrounding areas such as Tanjung Pinang city, Bintan Regency, and Karimun Regency. This region of the Riau Islands Province near the Strait of Malacca includes one of the busiest shipping lanes in the world. It has an area of 3,432 square kilometres (1,325 sq mi), and in 2023 it had an estimated population of 1,941,225.

== Definition ==
The national government regards the Batam Metropolitan Area as including Batam, Tanjung Pinang, Bintan Regency, Karimun Regency. This area is on the international trade route and is directly adjacent to Singapore and Malaysia. In the region, tax and customs exemptions are applied to boost investment growth.

== Demographics ==
Administrative Region	Area (km^{2})	Pop'n 2020 Census	Pop'n 2022 estimate	Density (per km^{2}) 2022
Batam	1,034.73	1,196,396	1,269,413	1,226.8
Tanjung Pinang	150.37	227,663	239,854	1,595.1
Bintan Regency	1,317.15	159,518	165,781	125.9
Karimun Regency	930.45	253,457	266,177	286.1
Babinka	3,432.7	1,837,034	1,941,225	565.5

== Geography ==
Batam is a roughly oval island with many bays, islets, and peninsulas, located west of Bintan Island, south of Singapore, north of Rempang and Galang, and east of Bulang Island. The Singapore Strait separates Singapore and Batam, while the Riau Strait separates Batam and Bintan island.

== Economy ==
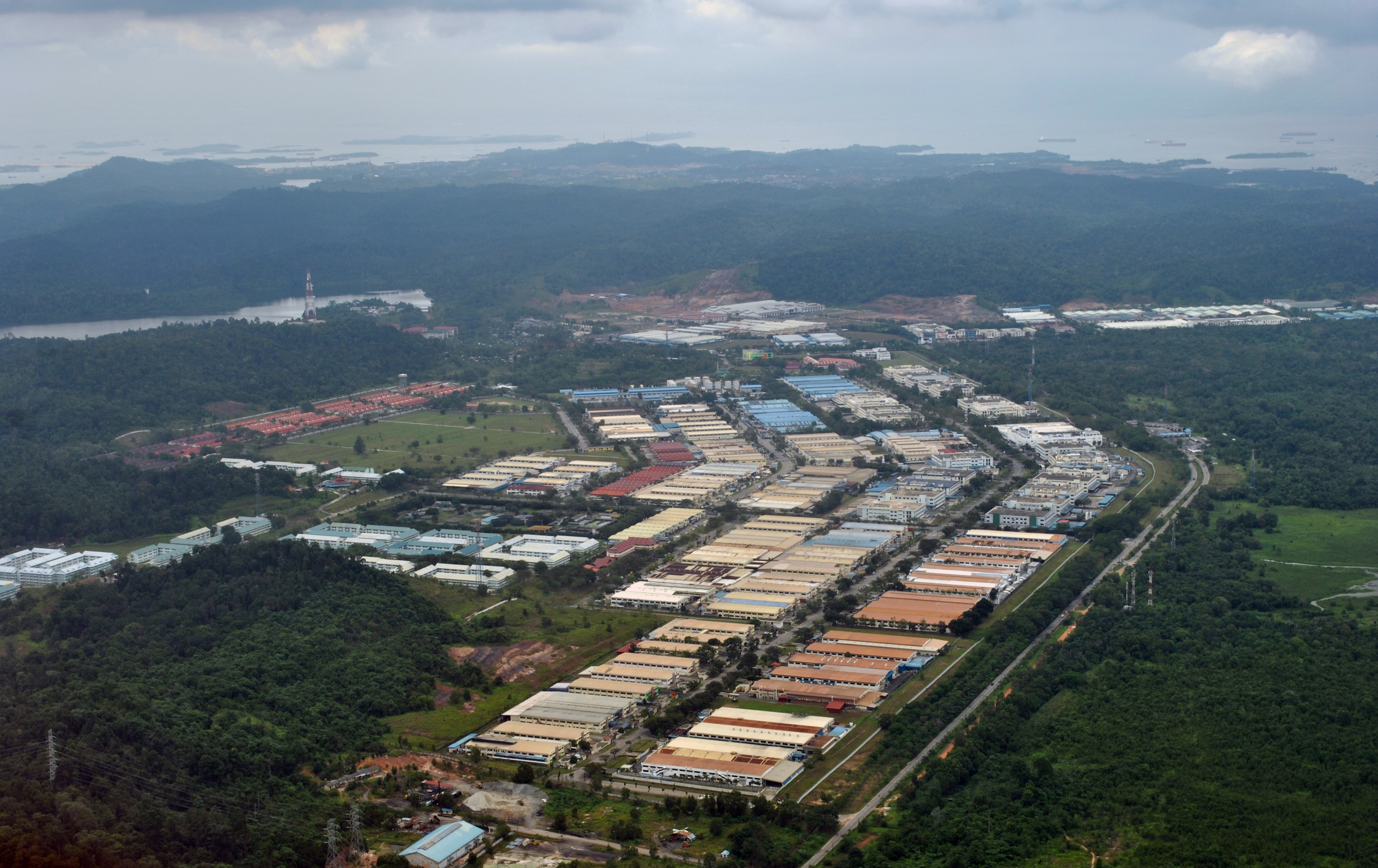
Industrial area in Batam

Under a framework signed in June 2006, Batam, along with parts of neighbouring Bintan and Karimun, are a part of a Special Economic Zone with Singapore; this zone eliminates tariffs and value-added taxes for goods shipped between Batam and Singapore. In 2007, Law No. 44 was enacted to supplement Law No. 36/2000 in establishing Batam as a free trade zone for 70 years.

=== Tourism ===
Over 1.5 million tourists visited in 2015. Batam is the third-busiest entry port to Indonesia next to Bali and Jakarta. In 2014, around 58.8% of foreign tourists came from Singapore, 12.8% from Malaysia and 4.2% from South Korea.

=== Foreign Investment ===
In the first semester of 2023, the value of foreign investment reached US$1.2 billion, while domestic investment was recorded at US$168 million. Most of the foreign investment came from Singapore.

== Infrastructure ==
Sekupang International Ferry Terminal

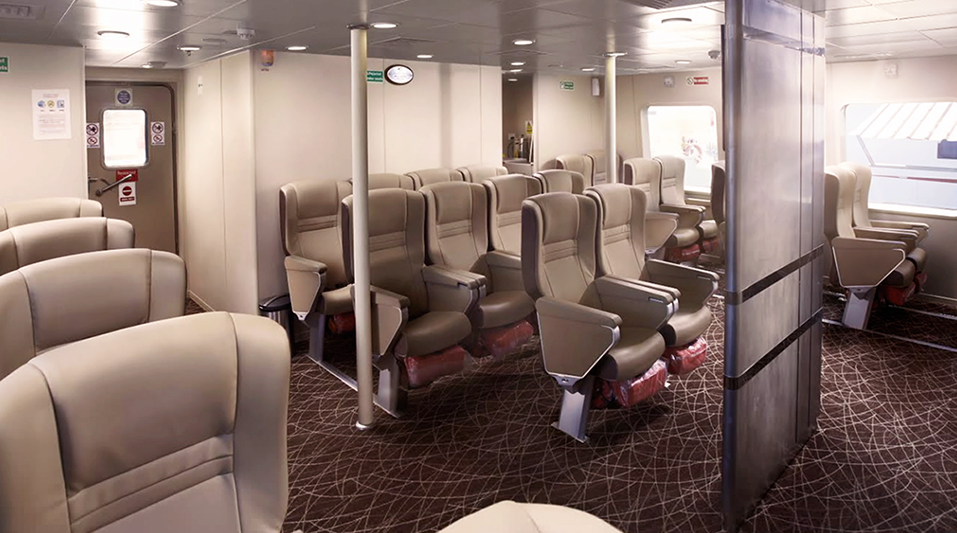
Horizon Fast Ferry

Ferries connect Batam to Singapore, Bintan, and Johor Bahru (Malaysia). Five ferry terminals are on the island: Batam Harbour Bay Ferry Terminal, Nongsapura Ferry Terminal, Sekupang, Waterfront City, and Batam Center Ferry Terminal. Connections to Singapore are by way of Harbourfront and Tanah Merah Ferry Terminals run by Singapore Cruise Centre (SCC).

Trans Batam is the most reliable and the cheapest public transportation in Batam. It began to operate in 2005. Trans Batam is the second BRT system in Indonesia, after Jakarta's TransJakarta. The price for one ride is Rp3,000 for students and Rp5,000 for the public. Trans Batam operates from 06:00 to 18:00.

Hang Nadim International Airport is the Batam island's main airport, and has the longest runway of all airports in Indonesia. The airport was the largest airport in the Sumatra region from 1995 to 2012 with a capacity of six million passengers annually, and is now the second-largest in the Sumatra region after Kuala Namu International Airport in Medan, which has a capacity of eight million passengers.

== See also ==
- List of metropolitan areas in Indonesia
- Jakarta metropolitan area
- Medan metropolitan area
- Padang metropolitan area
- Palembang metropolitan area
