= Solok =

City in West Sumatra, Indonesia

- City
- City of Solok; Kota Solok
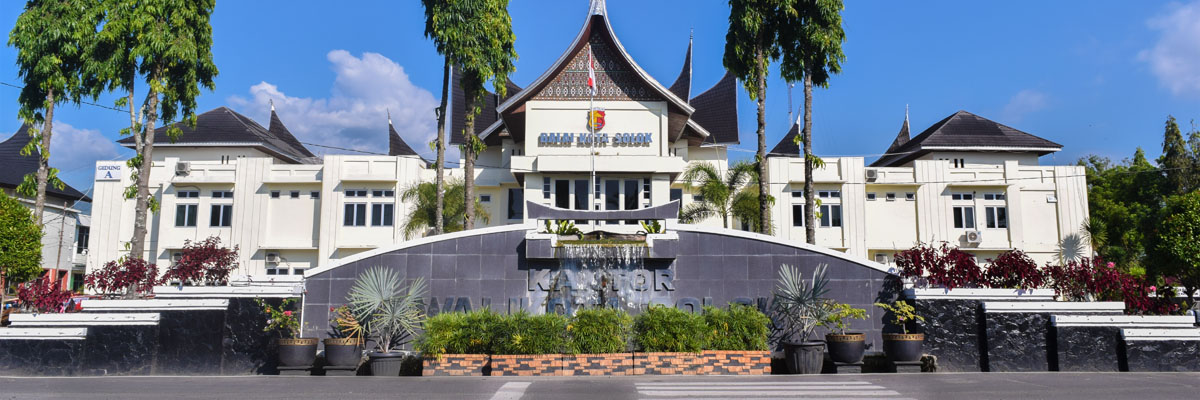
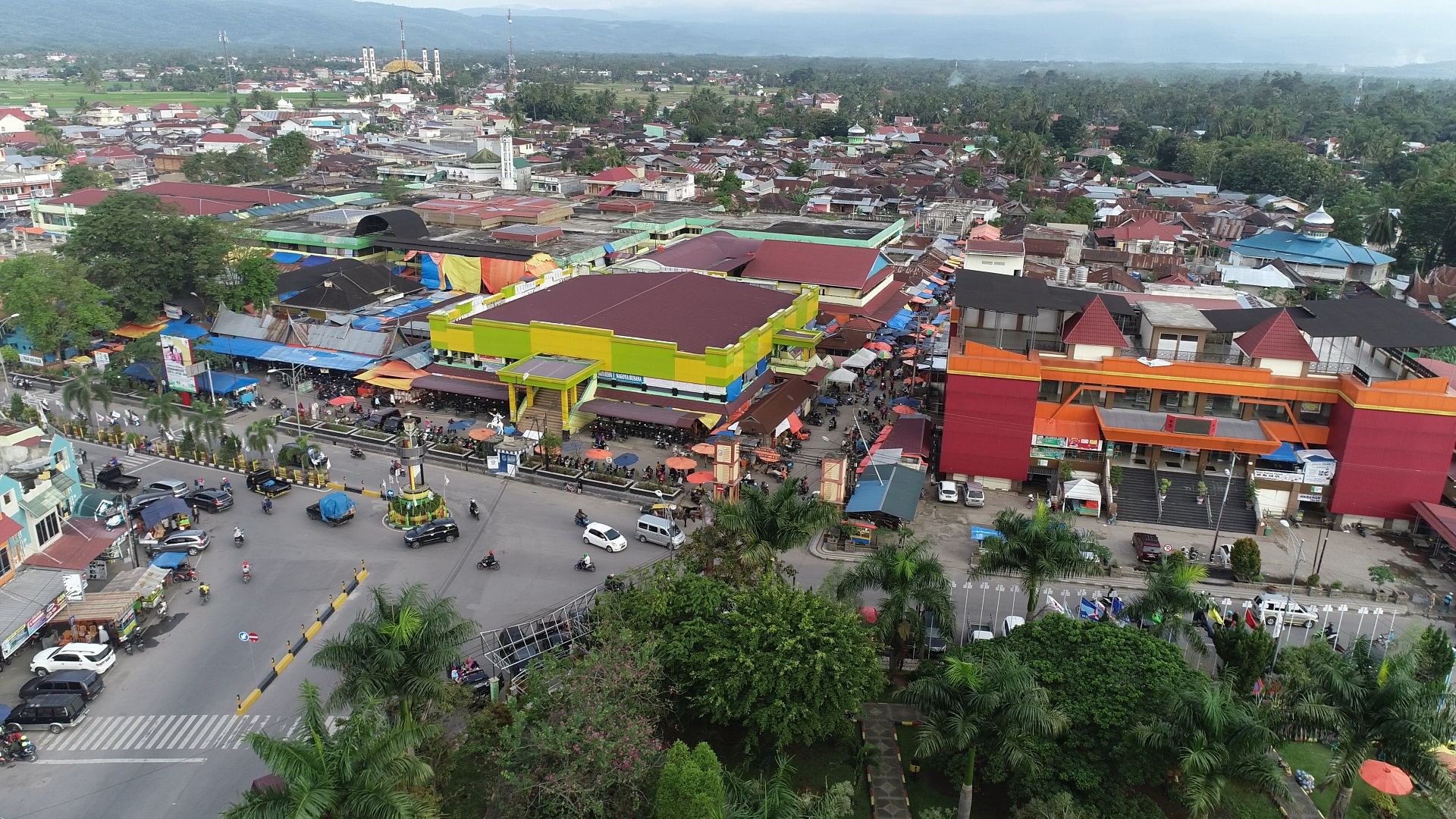
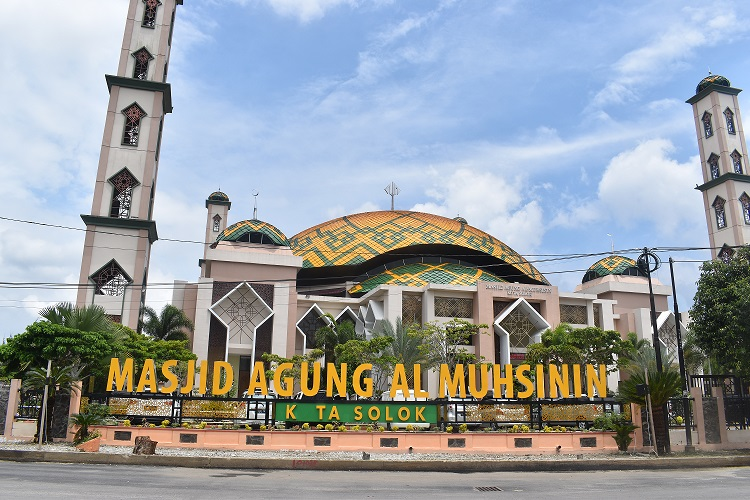
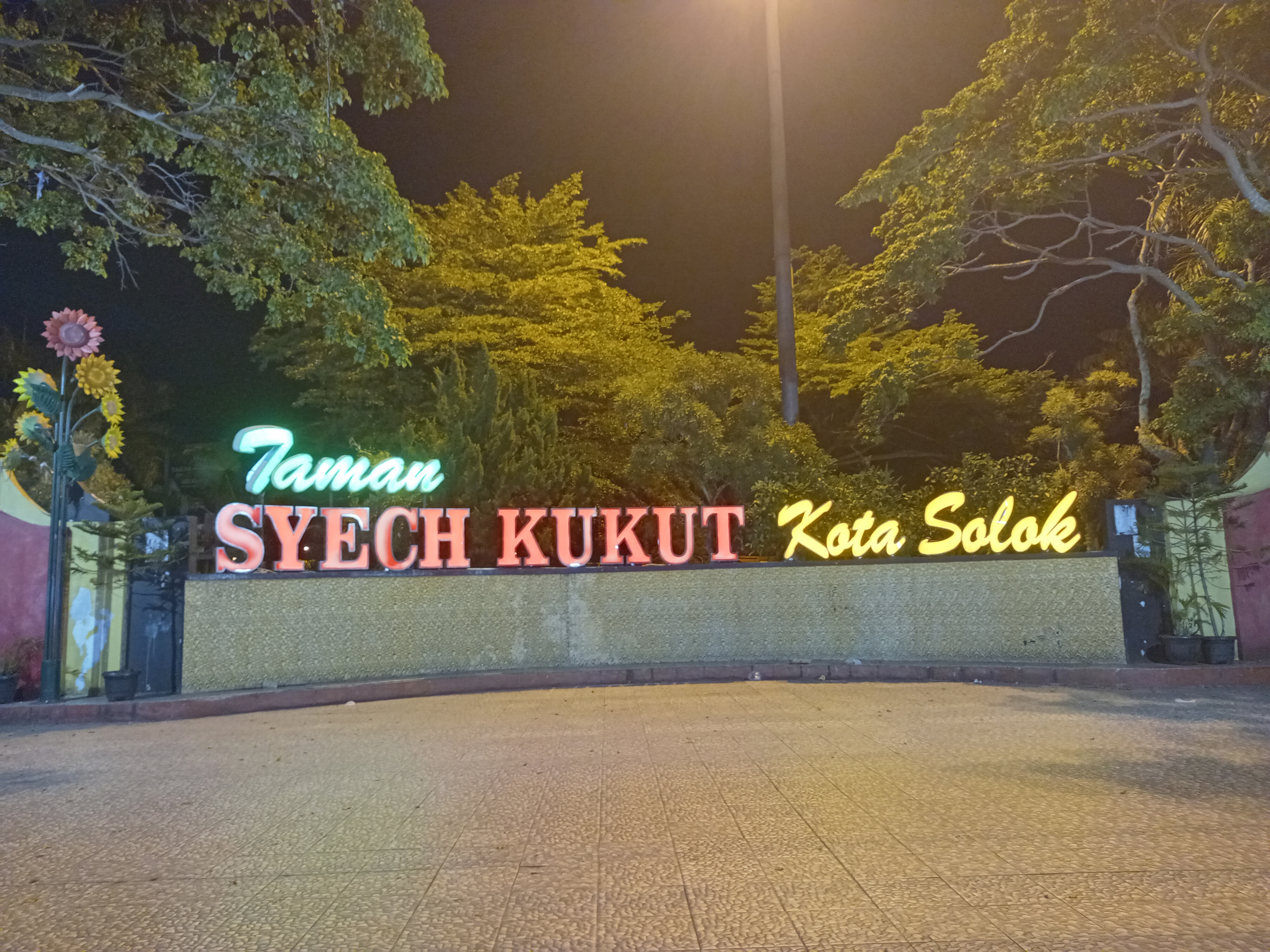
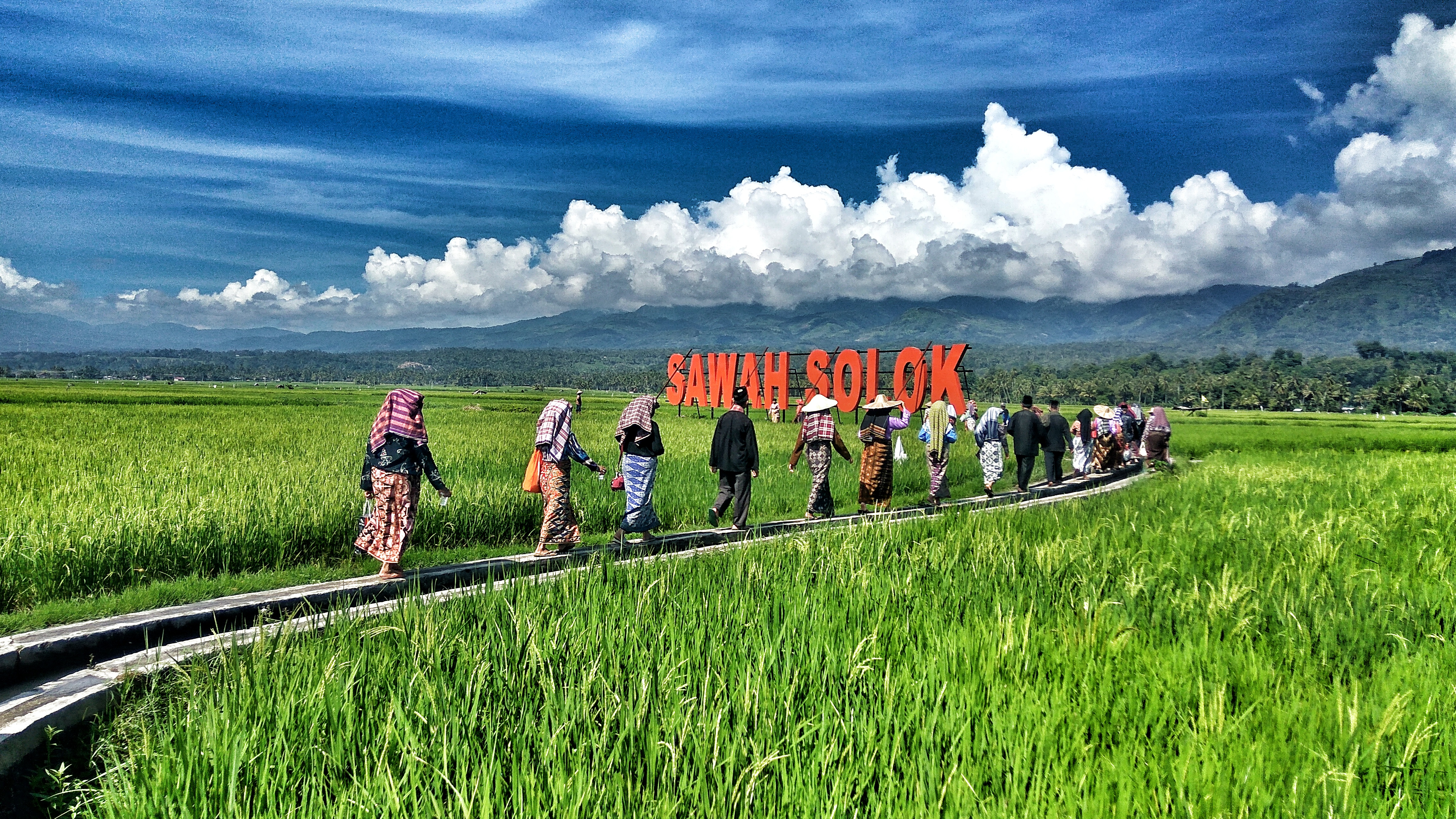
- Solok City hall Solok Public market Al-Muhsinin Grand mosque Syech Kukut park Rice fields (Bareh) in Solok

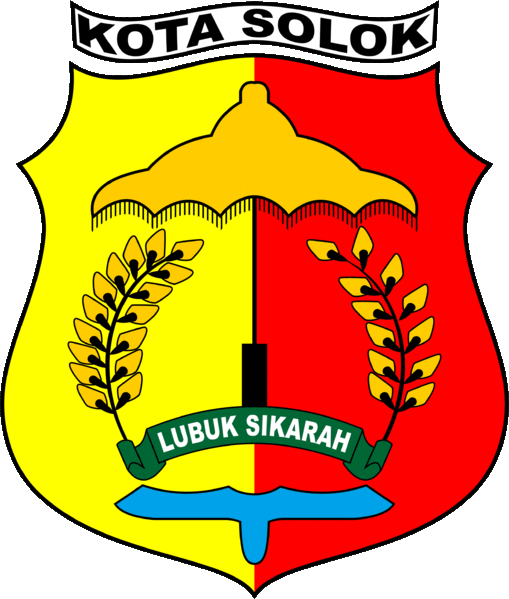
- Coat of arms
- Motto: Indonesian: Bersih, Elok, Rapi, Aman dan Sejahtera (BERAS) (Clean, Elegant, Neat, Safe and Prosperous)
- Location within West Sumatra

- Location in Sumatra and Indonesia Solok (Indonesia)
- Coordinates: 00°47′59″S 100°39′58″E
- Country: Indonesia
- Province: West Sumatra

Government
  - Mayor: Ramadhani Kirana Putra
  - Vice Mayor: Suryadi Nurdal

Area
  - Total: 58.72 km^{2} (22.67 sq mi)

Population (mid 2025 estimate)
  - Total: 81,059
  - Density: 1,380/km^{2} (3,575/sq mi)
- Time zone: UTC+7 (Indonesia Western Time)
- Area code: (+62) 755
- Climate: Af
- Website: solokkota.go.id

Solok (means valley) is a city in West Sumatra, Indonesia. The motto of this city is Kota Beras which is an abbreviation of "Bersih, Elok, Rapi, Aman dan Sejahtera". It has an area of 58.72 km^{2} (0.14 percent of the area of West Sumatra), a population of 59,396 at the 2010 Census, and 73,438 at the 2020 Census; the official estimate as of mid 2025 was 81,059 (comprising 40,969 males and 40,190 females). Solok topography varies between the plains and hilly with a height of 390 m above sea level. Three tributaries cross Solok, namely Batang Lembang, Batang Gawan, and Batang Air Binguang.

Judging from the type of soil, 21.37 percent of the land in Solok is rice fields and the remaining 78.63 percent is used for other than rice fields. The travel time from Solok to Padang is 75 minutes, to the city of Padang Panjang for 60 minutes, and to Sawahlunto for 40 minutes.

== Administration ==
Solok City is divided into two administrative districts (kecamatan) which are listed below with their areas and populations at the 2010 census and the 2020 census, together with the official estimates as of mid 2025. The table also includes the number of administrative urban villages (kelurahan) in each district.

Name of District (kecamatan)	Area in km^{2}	Pop'n 2010 census	Pop'n 2020 census	Pop'n mid 2025^{(a)} estimate	Admin centre	No. of villages
Lubuk Sikarah	35.98	32,645	40,720	48,103	Tanah Garam	7
Tanjung Harapan	22.74	26,751	32,718	38,808	Tanjung Paku	6
Totals	58.72	59,396	73,438	86,911	Lubuk Sikarah	13

Notes: (a) Based on 2025 registration totals, giving a combined figure of 86,911 (as compared with the official estimate of 81,059). The two districts comprise respectively the west and east parts of the city.

== Climate ==
Solok has a tropical rainforest climate (Af) with heavy rainfall year-round.

Climate data for Solok
Month	Jan	Feb	Mar	Apr	May	Jun	Jul	Aug	Sep	Oct	Nov	Dec	Year
Mean daily maximum °C (°F)	29.5 (85.1)	29.9 (85.8)	30.0 (86.0)	30.2 (86.4)	30.5 (86.9)	30.1 (86.2)	29.8 (85.6)	29.8 (85.6)	29.4 (84.9)	29.3 (84.7)	29.3 (84.7)	29.2 (84.6)	29.8 (85.5)
Daily mean °C (°F)	25.1 (77.2)	25.2 (77.4)	25.3 (77.5)	25.7 (78.3)	25.8 (78.4)	25.2 (77.4)	25.0 (77.0)	24.9 (76.8)	24.9 (76.8)	25.0 (77.0)	25.1 (77.2)	24.9 (76.8)	25.2 (77.3)
Mean daily minimum °C (°F)	20.7 (69.3)	20.6 (69.1)	20.7 (69.3)	21.2 (70.2)	21.1 (70.0)	20.4 (68.7)	20.2 (68.4)	20.1 (68.2)	20.5 (68.9)	20.8 (69.4)	20.9 (69.6)	20.7 (69.3)	20.7 (69.2)
Average rainfall mm (inches)	268 (10.6)	190 (7.5)	240 (9.4)	282 (11.1)	191 (7.5)	141 (5.6)	114 (4.5)	146 (5.7)	176 (6.9)	257 (10.1)	272 (10.7)	269 (10.6)	2,546 (100.2)
Source: Climate-Data.org
