= Banjar people =

Ethnic group of Borneo

Banjarese
Urang Banjar اورڠ بنجر
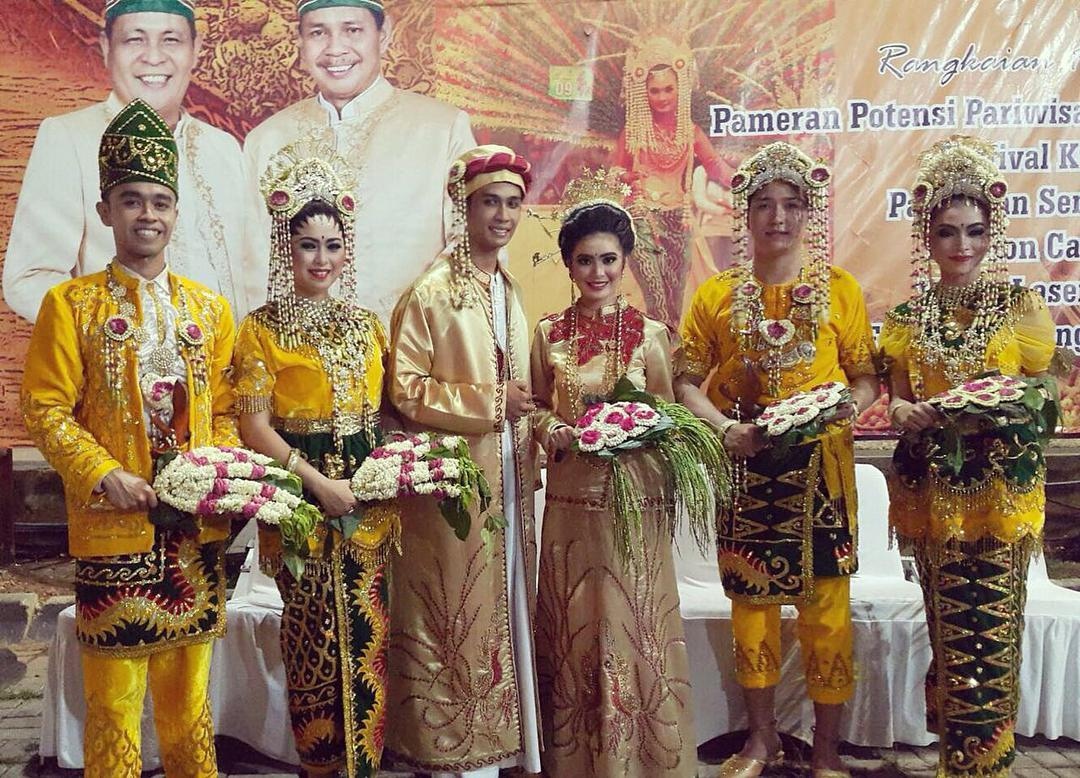
- Three Banjarese couples wearing traditional Banjarese attire (from left to right: Bagajah Gamuling Baular Lulut, Babaju Kun Galuh Pasinan, and Baamar Galung Pancar Surya/Matahari) in South Kalimantan, Indonesia

Total population
- c. 5.7 million

Regions with significant populations
- Indonesia: 4,127,124 (2010)
- South Kalimantan: 2,686,627
- Central Kalimantan: 464,260
- East Kalimantan: 440,453
- Riau: 227,239
- North Sumatra: 125,707
- Jambi: 102,237
- West Kalimantan: 14,430
- East Java: 12,405
- West Sumatra: 11,811
- West Java: 9,383
- Jakarta: 8,572
- Diaspora: 2,200,000+
- Malaysia: c. 2.2 million (2017)
- Singapore: see Malay Singaporeans

Languages
- Native: Banjarese; Dialects: Hulu Banjar (Inner River Banjar), Kuala Banjar (Estuary Banjar), Pesisir Banjar (Coast Banjar); Also: Indonesian, Malaysian Malay, Arabic (for religious use); Other: Dayak languages (such as Ma'anyan, Bakumpai), Malay, Buginese, Javanese, English

Religion
- Islam (majority Sunni) (Note: The large majority of Banjarese people are adherents of Islam of the Shafi'i Sunni madhhab, with a minority adhering to Christianity of Roman Catholics.)

Related ethnic groups
- Austronesian peoples: Meratus Dayak; Bakumpai; Ngaju; Ma'anyan; Lawangan; Kutai; Malays; Iban; Javanese

The Banjarese (Note: /ˈbændʒəˌriːz/ BAN-juh-reez) (Banjar: Urang Banjar, Jawi script: اورڠ بنجر; Indonesian: Orang Banjar) or simply Banjar, are an Austronesian ethnic group native to the Banjar regions (notably Banjarmasin, Banjarbaru, Banjar Regency, etc.) in the southeastern Kalimantan regions of Indonesia. Nowadays, Banjarese diaspora can be found in neighbouring Banjar regions as well; including Kotabaru Regency, the southeastern regions of Central Kalimantan, southernmost regions of East Kalimantan, and some provinces of Indonesia in general. The Banjarese diaspora community also can be found in neighbouring countries of Indonesia, such as Brunei, Malaysia (notably in Perak, Selangor, Kedah, and Johor, with significant minorities in Sabah), and Singapore.

The Banjars form the major indigenous group within the southern coast of the South Kalimantan region, which is rich in history, traditional heritage, and various attire and language as well as customs. Beginning from their earliest Animist-Buddhist-Hindu kingdoms of Negara Dipa and Negara Daha, followed by the establishment of the Sultanate of Banjar in the 16th century after the massive Islamisation and subsequent interactions with the Europeans through both the British and the Dutch following the arrivals of the English East India Company (EIC) and the Dutch East India Company (VOC) in 1602 and 1603, which resulted in their rapid subsequent modernisation in the late 19th century through transition from a river-based agrarian society to a more integrated, urbanised, and administratively diverse community after the abolition of their sultanate by the Dutch in 1860.

They are further divided into three distinct sub-ethnics known as the Batang Banyu Banjar, Kuala Banjar, and Pahuluan Banjar and are acknowledged to be heavily influenced by both Malay and Dayak languages through phonological and morphological perspectives, with Banjar within the region of South Kalimantan classified into two main linguistic types: the Hulu Banjar and Kuala Banjar. The Pahuluan Banjar (Hulu Banjar) inhabits the upper lands and hills known for their agricultural areas, with a rather stiff, short, loud and fast dialect, while Kuala Banjar mostly inhabits the river banks, islands, estuaries and hamlets with a dialect that flows and meanders, which is not loud and very fast, with the differences not being too striking, perhaps only in the use of some vocabulary, resulting in the two language dialect speakers having no difficulty in communication or in conversation. The Batang Banyu dialect, meanwhile, is a distinct variant of the Banjarese language, featuring unique vocabulary and pronunciations that differ from the two major dialects of Kuala Banjar and Hulu Banjar.

== Etymology ==
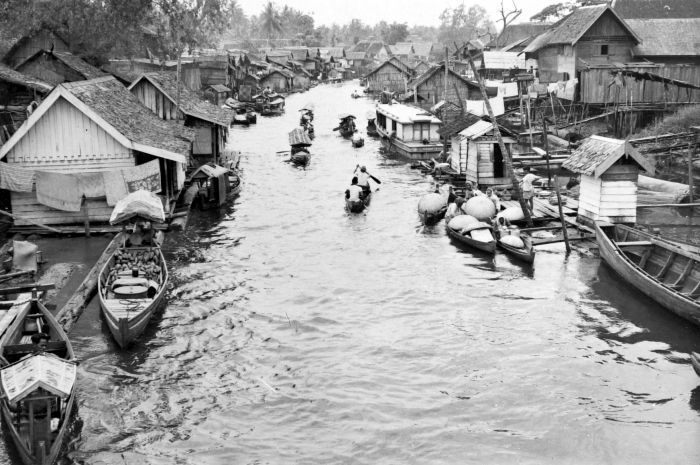
Rows of water villages on the riverbank of Dutch Bandjermasin, the villages of the Banjars, c. 1920–1940

The word Banjar is believed to have originated from the word Banjarmasih, which was once a village for Malay ethnic groups located at the mouth of the Kuwin River, a tributary of the Barito River. Banjar carries the meaning of "village" while Masih is the name of a Malay tribal chief or Patih—the Ngaju Dayak people refer to this Malay tribal chief of "Patih Masih" as "Oloh Masih". Another version states that the word means "rows", which turns into a row of houses, villages, hamlets, or water villages along the South Kalimantan riverbank. The word Banjarmasih gradually changed to its current pronunciation of Bandjermasin (Banjarmasin) due to the Dutch pronunciation. Based on the Malay-English dictionary written by British colonial administrator and historian Richard James Wilkinson in 1908, banjar carries the meaning of row, which is also an Old Javanese language. The word is also derived from terminology in the Janyawai dialect of the Ma'anyan language, which is also rooted in Old Javanese. It is initially used to identified the Ma'anyan, Meratus Dayak, and Ngaju people who are already "Javanised" when the Javanese people arrived in the southeastern Kalimantan regions to establish their civilisation, as recorded in Ma'anyan poetry of "Nansarunai Usak Jawa". The term banjar (ꦧꦚ꧀ꦗꦂ) itself in Javanese language is a short form of a verb mbanjarke (ꦩ꧀ꦧꦚ꧀ꦗꦂꦏꦺ), which means "to separate and rearrange" literally. It is 'common knowledge' within the communities of South Kalimantan that the Banjarese people were formerly part of larger Dayak community.

== Background history and origin ==
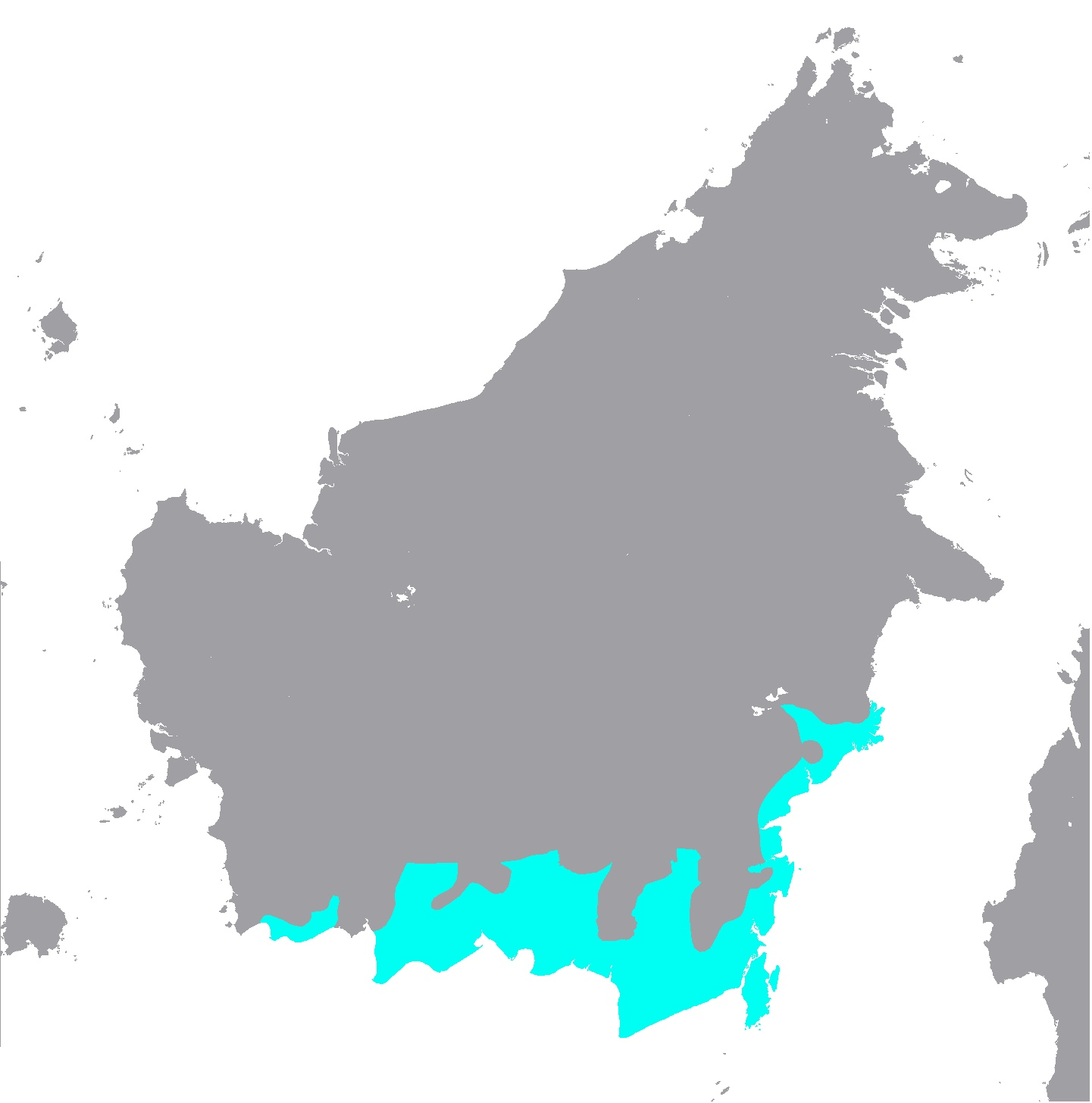
The south coast of Borneo, areas with large concentration of Banjarese in Indonesia

Around 2500 BC, the Austronesian people began to migrate into Borneo from an area in South China through Taiwan and the Philippines archipelago. Later, in 400 AD, the Indianised cultural influences, rather than a direct mass migration solely from Sumatra, were spread to Borneo, as evidenced by the Yūpa inscriptions found in Kutai, East Kalimantan. In 520 AD, Sumatran immigrants further formed the Buddhist Kingdom of Tanjungpuri in the present-day region of Tanjung, Tabalong. This cultural fusion led to the birth of the Upper Banjar language (Bahasa Banjar Hulu). The what would be known as the Banjar people have inhabited several areas in Central and East Kalimantan since ancient times, particularly the lowlands and downstream areas of the region's rivers. This ethnic group are made up of the Bukit, Ma'anyan, Lawangan, and Ngaju tribes, which are heavily influenced by Malay and Javanese, which resulted in the Banjar people's origins as a mixture of several tribes, with Dayak becoming the dominant group.

In the 14th century, Empu Jatmika migrating from Keling, Kediri built the Hindu Kingdom of Negara Dipa by the river of Tapin. It later came to be ruled under Majapahit's Rajasa dynasty and became the start of the Javanese-style courts in South Kalimantan. This Hindu era in South Kalimantan remained influential period in South Kalimantan's history with Negara Dipa was succeeded by the Hindu Kingdom of Negara Daha in the 15th century. According to history, Prince Samudera, the rightful heir to the kingdom of Negara Daha, was forced to flee the court of because of his uncle's, Prince Tumenggung revolt against him. He was then accepted by the people of Bandar Masih (Bandar: port; Masih: Malay people) in 1525. Supported by the Sultanate of Demak in Java, he formed a new Islamic kingdom for the Banjar in 1526 with Bandar Masih as its capital. The conversion of the Banjar Kingdom into the Sultanate of Banjar was led by himself, who later became Sultan Surianshah of Banjar after embracing Islam following successful military assistance from the Sultanate of Demak to defeat his rival uncle. The conversion was a precondition given by the Demak Sultanate when Sultan Surianshah sought help in the battle against Prince Tumenggung.

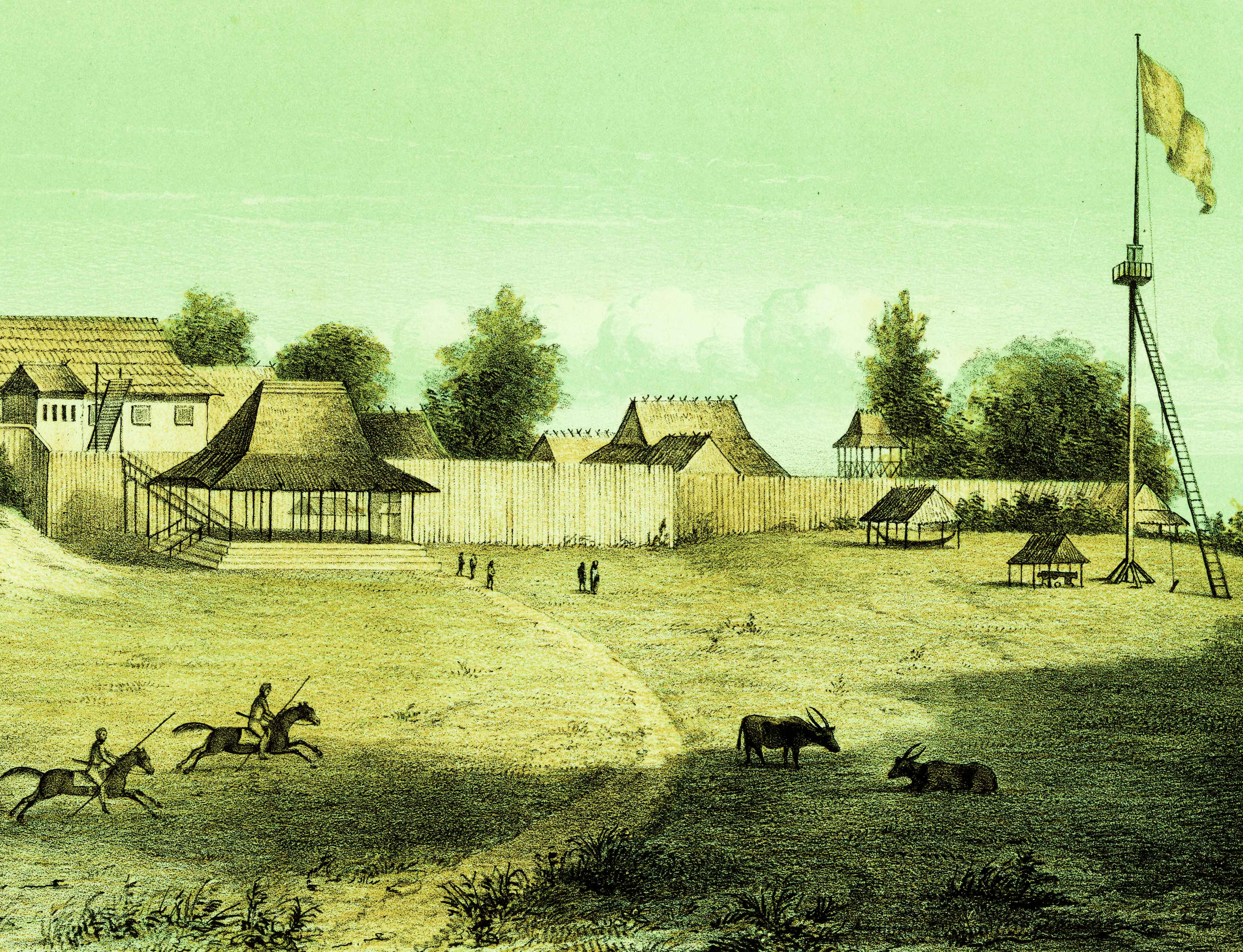
Kraton of the Sultanate of Banjar in Dutch Bandjermasin, c. 1859–1861

The story of the early Banjarese kingdom is featured on the Hikayat Banjar (Tale of the Banjar), beginning from the 16th century, which underwent strong Javanese influence. The English East India Company (EIC) established trade relations with the Banjars in 1602, and the Dutch East India Company (VOC) followed suit in 1603, occasionally trading with the Banjarese until hostility grew against Dutch shipping. Several further expeditions were sent by the Dutch in 1606 and 1612 to conquer the sultanate, although this did not become fruitful. Following the death of Sultan Hamidullah (Sultan Kuning) in 1734 and the subsequent power struggle among the Banjarese, conflict with the Dutch escalated into the Banjarmasin War, which resulted in subsequent Dutch rule in the South Kalimantan region. The name of Bandar Masih was later changed to its present name of Bandjermasin (Banjarmasin) throughout the Dutch colonial rule.

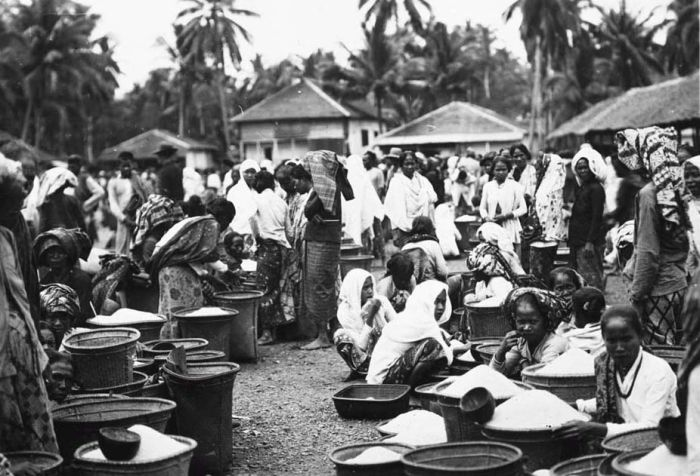
An open market in Kandangan, Hulu Sungai Regency (present-day South Hulu Sungai Regency) of Dutch Borneo, c. 1910–1940

In 1687, a Theatine missionary named Antonino Ventimiglia was commissioned by Pope Innocent XI to preach Christianity in Borneo. On 16 January 1688, Ventimiglia arrived in Bandar Masih from Portuguese Macau after the Portuguese were given permission by Sultan Agung of Banjar (Sultan Adipati Anom) to bring a pastor and given land as part of their trade relations agreement. However, the Portuguese missionaries' journey to the island was not smooth since the first attempt by the missionaries into the interior jungles of Borneo to preach the Gospel among the indigenous pagan Dayaks resulted in the killings of several missionaries, with the British having received the same fate earlier in 1707. Since the 19th century, coupled with labour migration agreements for economical purposes throughout colonial rule between the Dutch and the British, migration of the Banjarese people went as far as the east coast of Sumatra and Malaysia. In Malaysia and Singapore, Banjarese people are classified as part of the ethnic Malays. The Banjarese in Singapore mostly reside within Kampong Glam, which is the melting pot between other ethnic groups, and they were categorised as part of the Malay Singaporeans. Based on the latest research and genetic studies in 2016, the Banjar are found to be the close ancestors of both the Malagasy of Madagascar and Comorians of the Comoros islands within southeast Africa.

== Sub-ethnicities ==
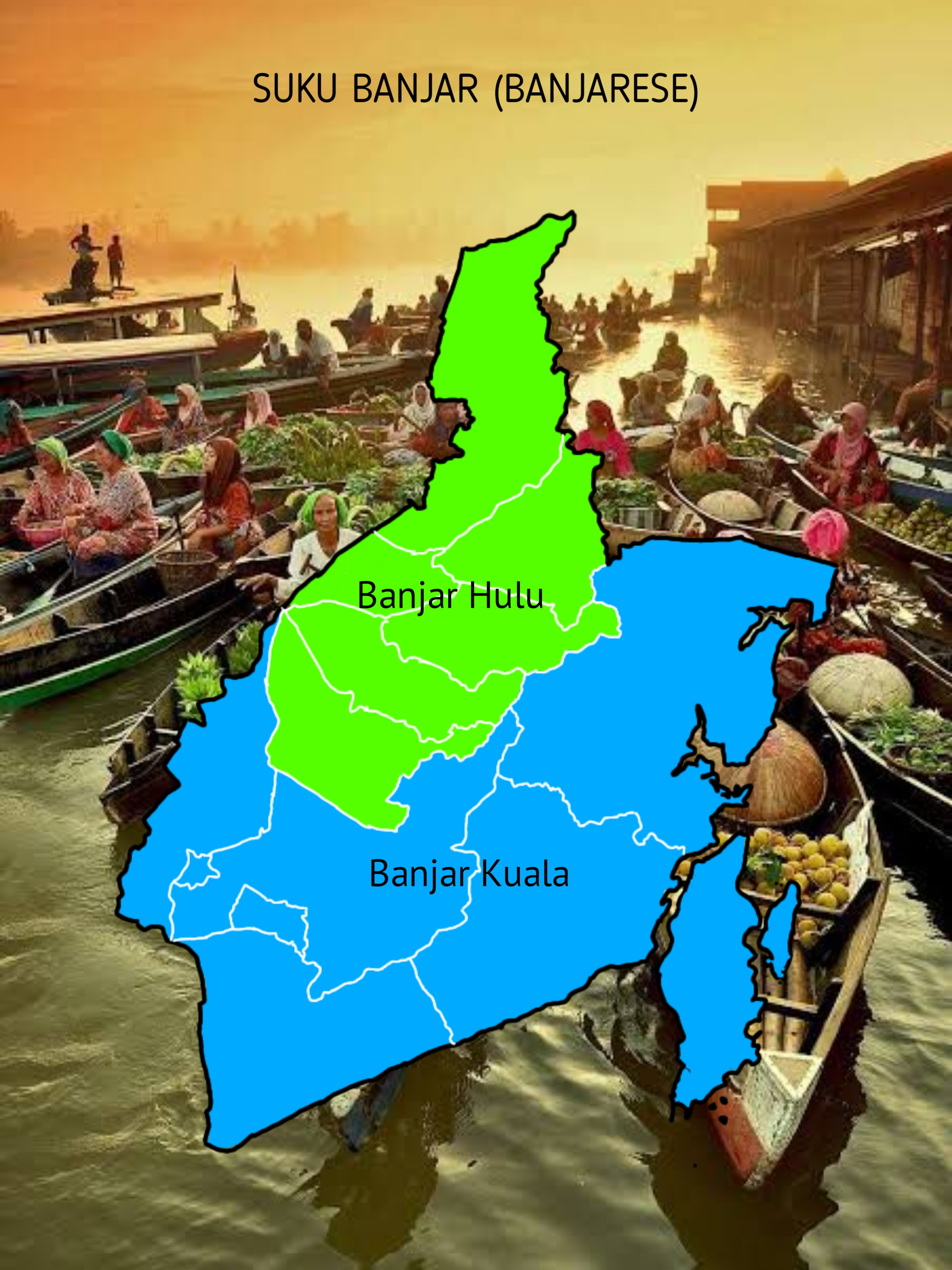
The two main Banjar sub-ethnic groups in South Kalimantan are the Pahuluan Banjar, located in the northern inner region, and the Kuala Banjar, which are found in the southern area. Another sub-ethnic group, the Batang Banyu, are more to the river in the western area not shown in the map

The Banjar people can be divided into three main sub-ethnics based on the locations of the assimilation between the Malays, the local indigenous Dayaks (Hill Dayak (Bukit), Ma'anyan Dayak, Lawangan Dayak, Ngaju Dayak, Barangas Dayak, and Bakumpai), and the Javanese people with the main element that forms the Banjar tribe originating from the Dayak tribe. The Batang Banyu Banjar (also Batangbanyu) sub-ethnic group essentially refers to the Banjar ethnic group that predominantly resides in the Negara River valley. Researchers believe that the Batangbanyu were formed from a mixture of the Ma'anyan Dayak, Lawangan Dayak, Dusun Dayak and ancient Malay people of the Srivijaya era more than 1,500 years ago, where the people have absorbed a lot of Malay and Dayak culture, which has now become a distinctive culture of the Batangbanyu Banjar tribe. The Kuala Banjar is defined as the indigenous Banjar ethnic community who live around the Martapura and Barito rivers, namely the cities of Banjarmasin, Martapura, Banjarbaru and their surroundings. According to research, the Kuala Banjar was formed from a mixture of various indigenous Kalimantan ethnic groups such as Ngaju Dayak, Bakumpai, Ma'anyan, and Lawangan with Malay and Javanese ethnic groups from the Majapahit era with the word kuala or kwala itself in the Banjar language means "meeting" or "mixing". Pahuluan Banjar refers to various indigenous Dayak groups originating from the highlands or along the Meratus mountains, where these indigenous people still have many close ties with their ethnic groups, namely the Bukit ethnic group (or often referred to as Meratus Dayak) and Ma'anyan Dayak, the majority of whom inhabit the Meratus mountains and the northern part of South Kalimantan province. Due to the factor of Islamisation of the population of the Banjar sultanate around 500 years ago, gradually these native indigenous people began to absorb the Malay culture which was more closed and close to Islamic values and began to leaving their former culture and beliefs of Kaharingan until they called themselves the people of Banjar Hulu (Pahuluan).

- The Batang Banyu Banjar, who live in the valleys by the river of Negara.
- The Kuala Banjar, who live in Banjarmasin and Martapura.
- The Pahuluan Banjar, who live in the valleys by the upriver of Meratus mountain ranges.

== Culture and society ==
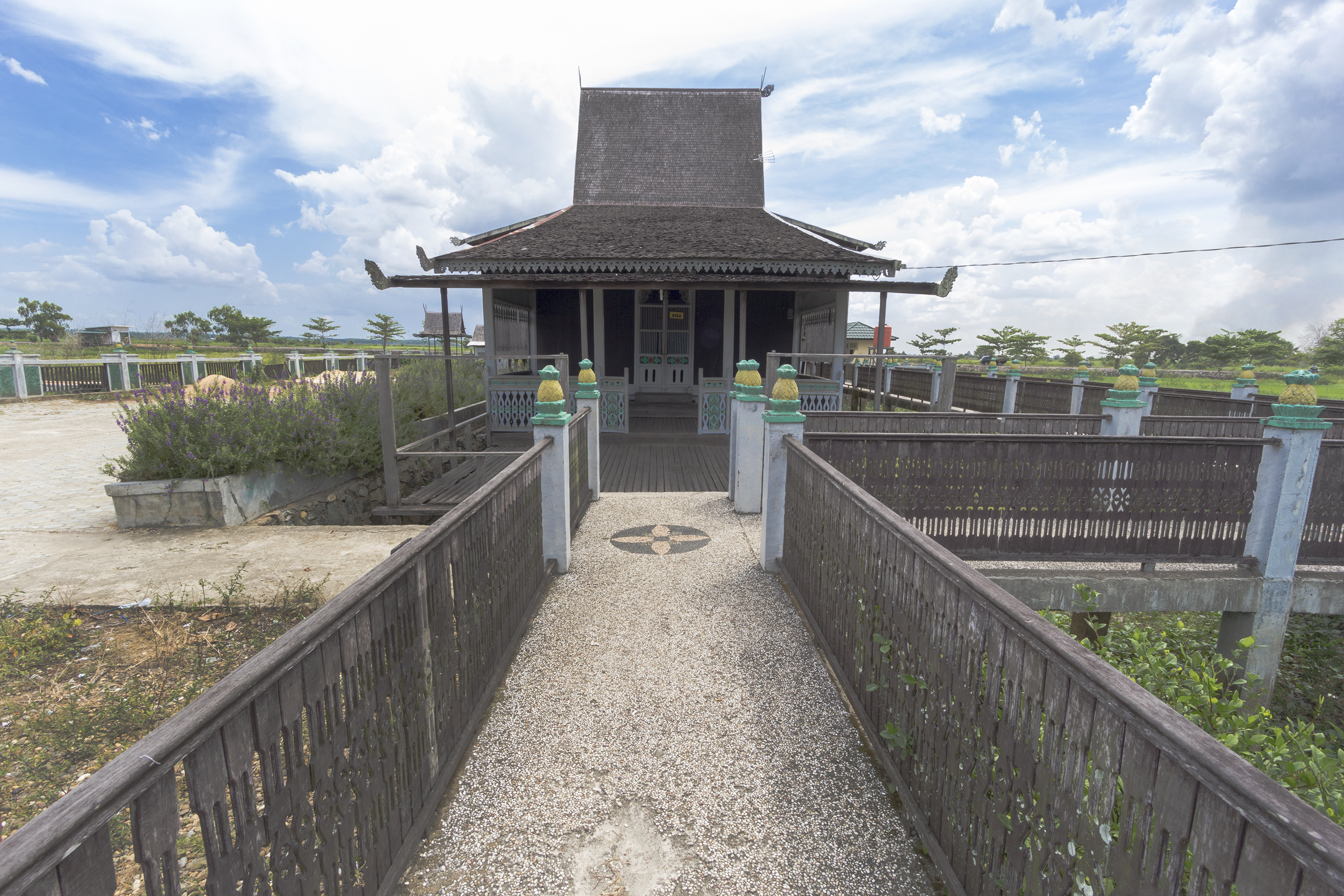
The traditional house of Banjarese nobles (Bubungan Tinggi) during the era of the Sultanate of Banjar, built around 1867

Banjar culture features a mixture of indigenous Dayak, Malay, and Javanese as well as influence from traders of Arab, Persian, Indian, and Chinese culture since the Banjar tribe itself comes from a mixture of several tribes. Banjar people really value good manners, respect for others, and maintaining good relationships between different kinds, such as the custom of accepting food or drink offered, which is a sign of respect for the giver, where these customs are rooted in their traditional beliefs on kapuhunan/kepuhunan (luck/fate). Their cultural customs are also rooted in the Kaharingan religious rituals, which, after mass conversion to Islam, following the establishment of the Sultanate of Banjar, were modified to align with their new faith of Sunni Islam. Since their conversion, the Banjar people's culture also has great respect for religious people wherein in the Banjar society not all their Islamic religious leaders have the authority to wear the turban. Their community have certain greetings among family members and respective individuals which are part of their custom of respecting others that are preserved and maintained to this day.

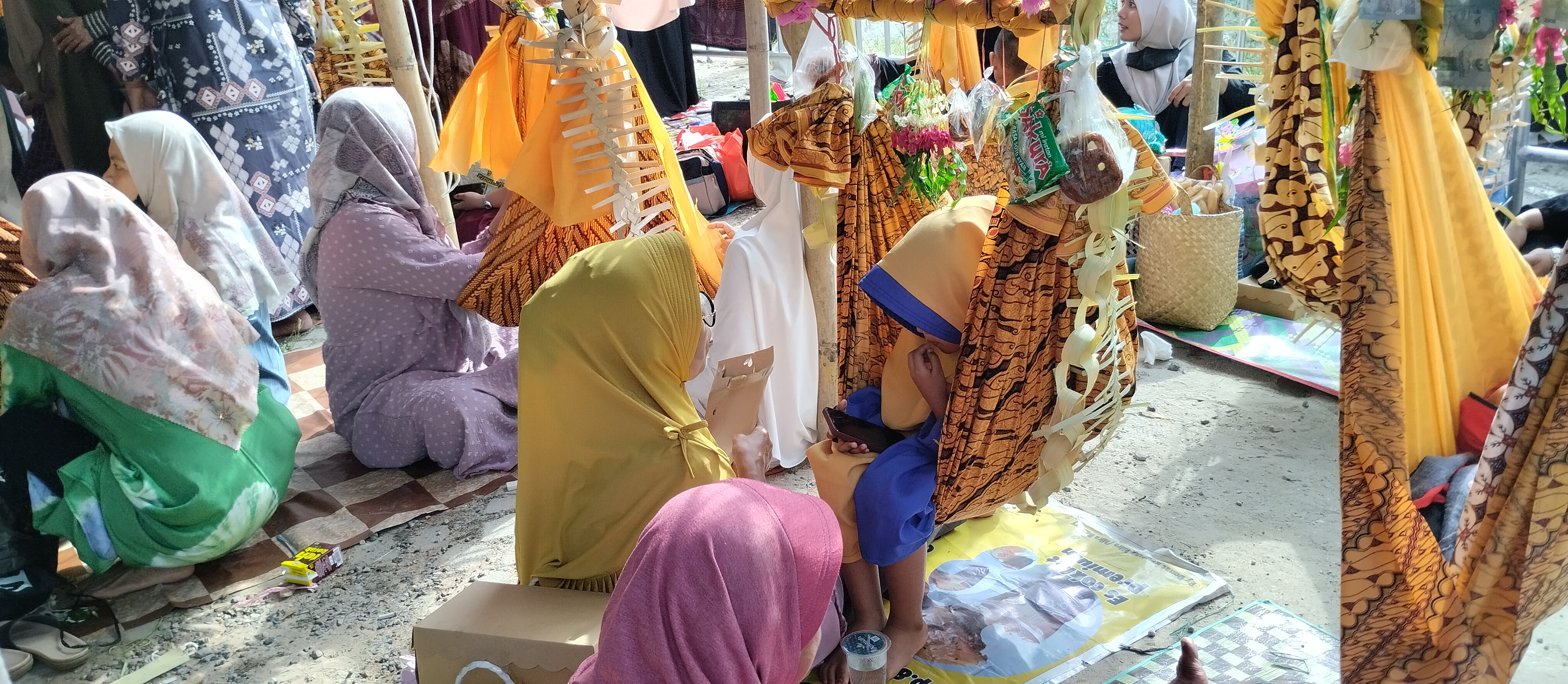
Baayun anak tradition

Within Malaysia, the Banjar ethnic group is one of the tribes found within the Malay community since their migration to the Malay Peninsula in the 19th century, although their community presence is less known than their Javanese counterpart. Their cultural customs are preserved by a non-governmental organisation, namely the Malaysian Banjar Association, which provides information about Banjar customs and has become the gathering place for Banjar communities throughout Malaysia. In Singapore, the Banjarese community continues to preserve their heritage through culture, language, and food while being similarly categorised as part of the republic's Malay group. Among the Banjarese in Indonesia as well as Malaysia, the tradition of baayun anak (swaddling/swinging child) was a child-blessing ritual for Kaharingan followers involving the recitation of balian mantras. In present-day Banjar society, the baayun anak no longer uses balian mantras but instead involves the recitation of Quranic verses and salawat for the Islamic Prophet Muhammad. The Banjar have a traditional cultural practice of putting infants to sleep in an upright sling made of tied fabric with such practice is called "bapukung". This tradition from the Banjar has experienced diffusion outside their ethnicity but remains alive and thriving within the Banjar overseas community, which has lived for generations in areas outside their native homeland.

=== Oral traditions ===
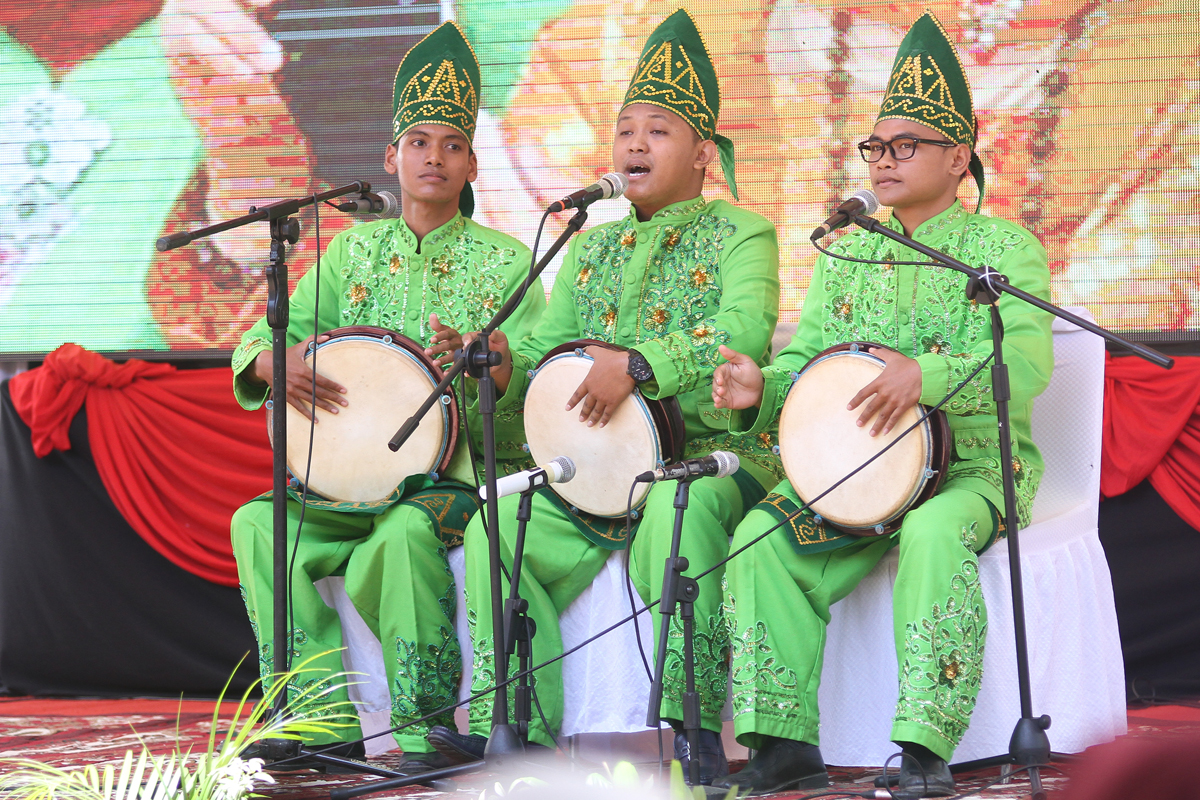
Madihin is an oral song performance originally from Banjar

The oral traditions of the Banjar people are influenced by Malay, Arabic, and Chinese cultures. Banjar oral traditions, which later evolved into art forms, began to develop around the 18th century, consisting of madihin and lamut (oral tradition). Madihin is derived from the Arabic word ﻤﺪﺡ (madah) and carries the meaning of "praise". It is a form of mouth-to-mouth expression, the result of oral culture in traditional societies, the content of which can be compared to written literature in modern society that serves as entertainment, delivered orally in the Banjar language, adhering to specific physical and mental structures according to the conventions of Banjar folklore in South Kalimantan. The madihin had existed since the end of the 18th century until the 19th century, when Sheikh Muhammad Arsyad al-Banjari, a Sunni Shafi'i cleric and royal member of the Banjar Sultanate, returned to the Banjar homeland after studying in the Islamic holy land of Mecca. Meanwhile, Lamut is a storytelling tradition that conveys messages and values related to Banjar religion, society, and culture where it originated in China and was initially performed in the Chinese language before being adapted into the Banjar language when it was introduced to the Banjarese by Chinese traders.

=== Folk theatre ===
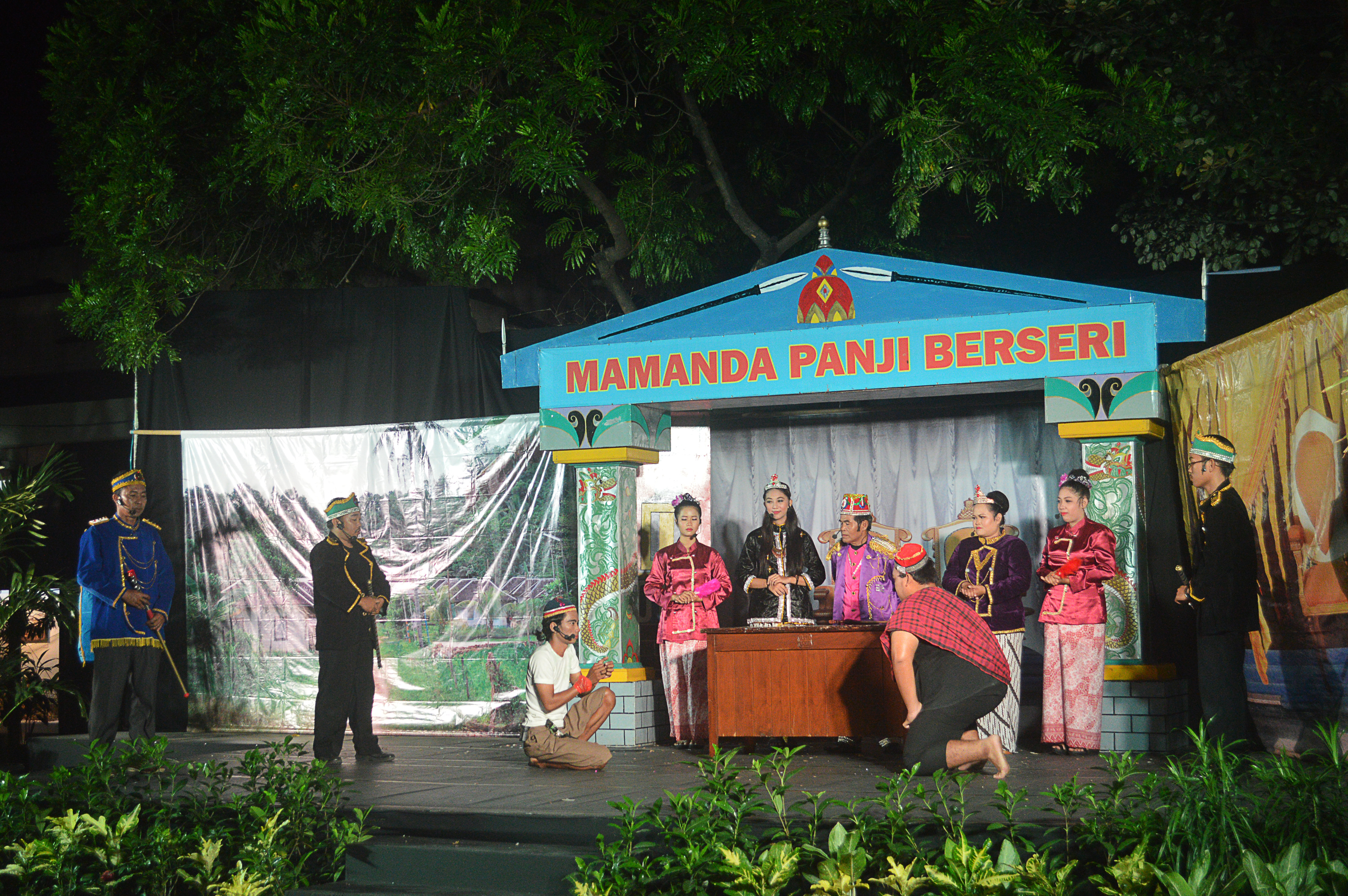
The performance of mamanda from Kutai, East Kalimantan

The only traditional theatrical art that developed on the island of Kalimantan is mamanda, which is a traditional theatre art developed in South Kalimantan with Malay origin. Compared to other performing arts, it is more similar to lenong of Betawi in terms of the interaction between the actors and the audience, although mamanda is usually performed in an arena, while lenong is not, with tables and chairs more commonly used as important properties. This interaction encourages the audience to actively share funny comments, which helps make the atmosphere more lively. The difference is that lenong has evolved with the times, whereas mamanda tends to follow a monotonous storyline centred around a royal court.

In mamanda, the characters are fixed, such as the Raja (king), Perdana Menteri (prime minister), Mangkubumi (bendahara), Wazir (vizier), Panglima Perang (warlord), Harapan Pertama (first adviser), Harapan Kedua (second adviser), Khadam (clown/adjutant), Permaisuri (queen), and Sandut (princess) where all the characters must appear in every performance. The performers' dress uses the common dress by the society at the time, although Western fashion also influenced the fashion and makeup styles. Additional characters are often introduced, such as the Raja dari Negeri Seberang (king from neighbouring country), Perompak (robber), Jin (jinn), Kompeni (company), and other supporting characters to enrich the story. It is believed that the term mamanda was used because, in the play, the characters such as the Wazir, Menteri, and Mangkubumi are addressed by the Raja as pamanda or mamanda. Mamanda etymologically comes from the word "mama" (mamarina), meaning uncle in the Banjar language, and "nda", which means "honourable". Therefore, mamanda refers to an "honourable uncle", a respectful term used for a family member in the kinship system.

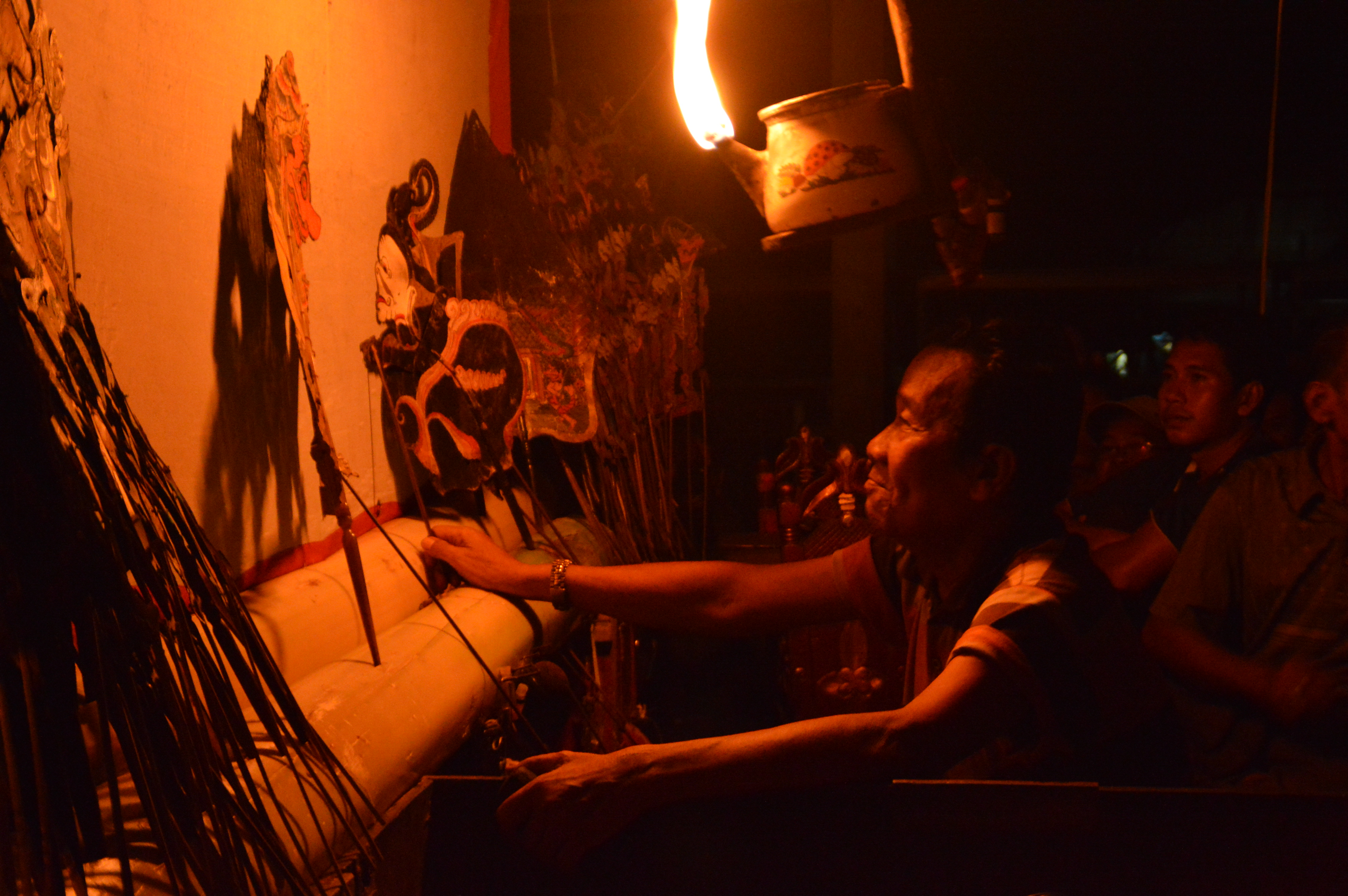
Wayang kulit Banjar performance in Central Hulu Sungai Regency of South Kalimantan

The Banjarese were also known for their unique wayang kulit Banjar (Banjarese leather puppet shadow theatre), a syncretic Hindu-Buddhist-Animist musical theatre form accompanied by gamelan music from Java with a blend of Javanese structural influences with distinct local Banjarese stories, characters, and language which has been around since the 14th century. It serves as both entertainment and a moral guide, often performed at weddings and traditional ceremonies and to fulfil vows. The form of Banjar shadow puppets is generally smaller than their Javanese counterpart, with the material used in the making usually from cow's or goat's hide. The characteristic of Banjar shadow puppets is that they have puppet names that represent affluent and bad persons, with the Banjarese shadow puppets not recognising suluk like Javanese shadow puppets do, but rather focusing more on the dialogue. Various initiatives are being conducted by the South Kalimantan Education and Culture Office (Disdikbud) through the South Kalimantan Cultural Park on the preservation of Banjarese leather puppet shadow theatre, especially by attracting the interests of the younger Banjarese generation.

=== Ethnic dance and music ===
Banjarese music accompanies the Japin Sigam dance, which originates from Laut Island (Pulau Laut), Kotabaru Regency

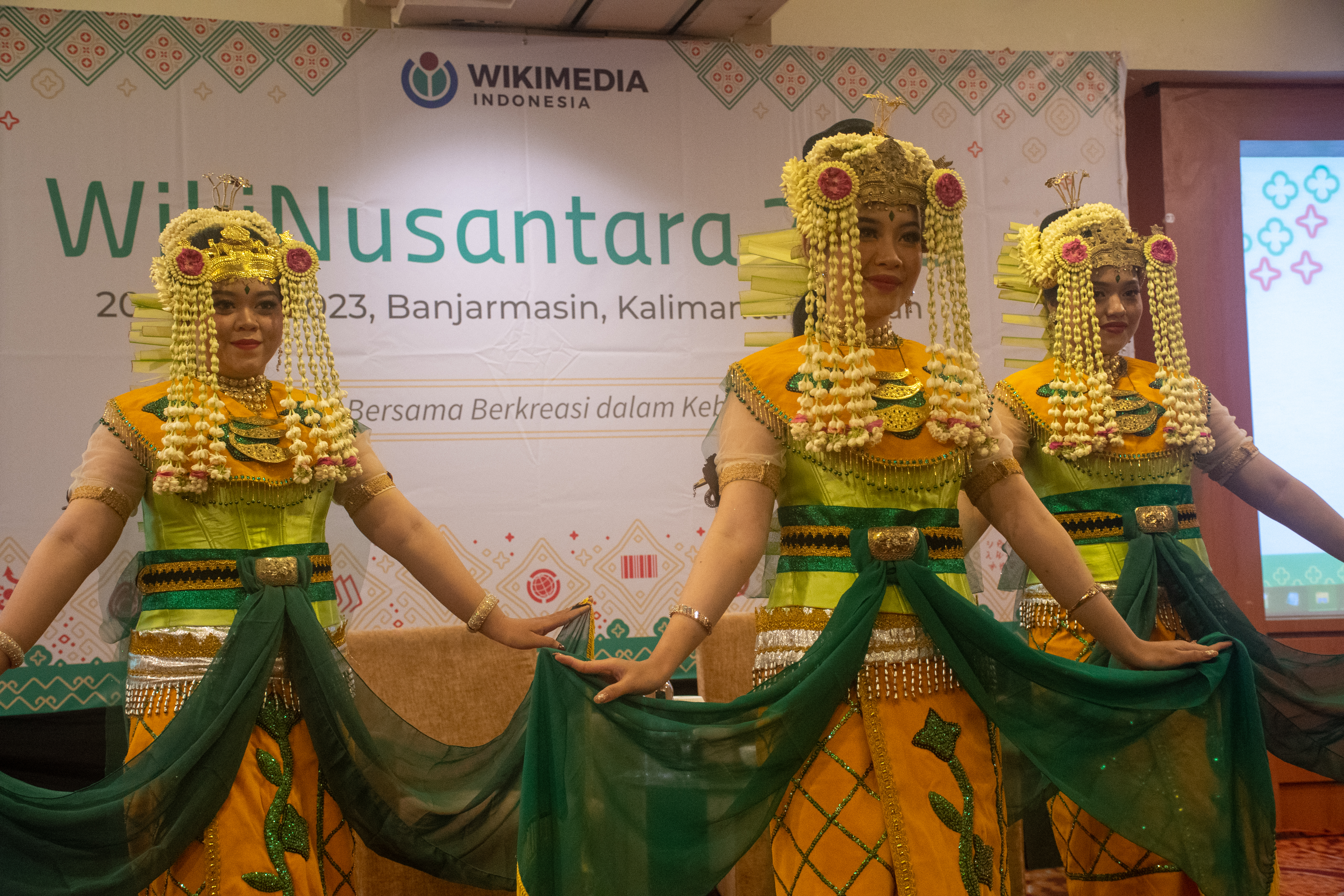
The Baksa kembang dance, a traditional dance of the Banjar once performed by the princesses of the Banjar palace to welcome guests

The Banjarese have their own Zapin dance known as the ''Japin Sigam'', which originated from the Kotabaru Regency. Danced by eight dancers (four men and four women), the dance combines the Japin Anak Delapan dance with the Sigam variety with the latter name refers to the name of a village in the regency of South Kalimantan. It is a social dance among young people in the Banjarese coastal areas and is also performed in offerings to the royal family, although in the present day it is more commonly performed as a dance to honour guests on special occasions. Banjar dance art is divided into two types, the first involving dances developed in the royal palace (kraton) and dances developed by the Banjar people. Palace dance is characterised by the term "baksa", derived from the Javanese word "beksan", which signifies the refinement of movements in the choreography where it is performed within the Banjarese kingdom to welcome honoured guests and the royal family. These dances have existed for hundreds of years since the Hindu era, but their movements and costumes have been adjusted to fit the present-day context. For example, certain movements considered inappropriate according to Islamic customs have been slightly modified. The dance which is known as baksa kembang was not only a traditional dance but also the symbol of hospitality and refined manners of the people of South Kalimantan, where it further gave rise to several versions, such as lagureh, tapung tali, kijik, and jumanang. In present days, the dance is occasionally performed in public events such as weddings and has become a folk dance for the Banjars.

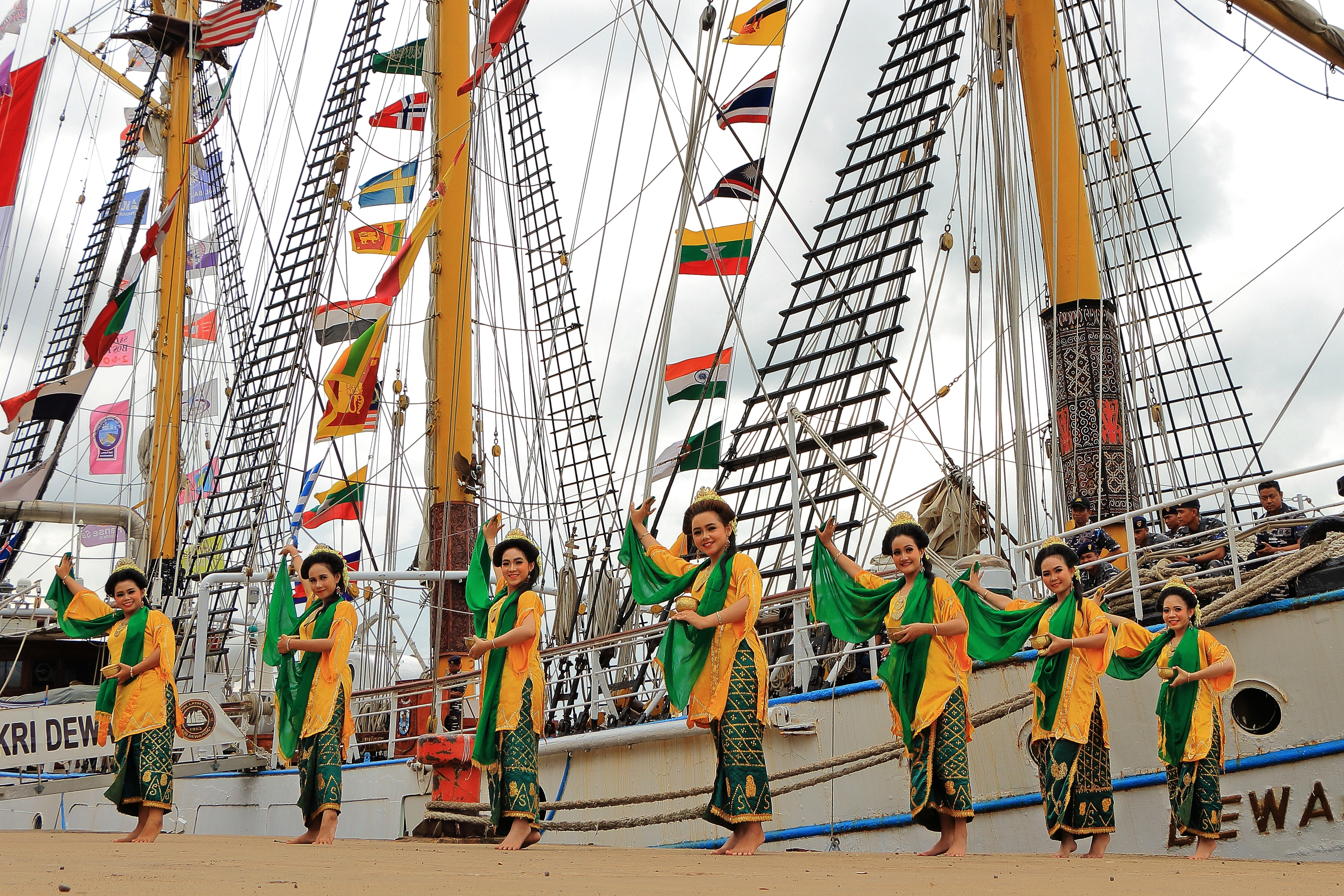
Radap Rahayu dance, a type of ritual dance commonly used for ethnic traditional rituals, such as weddings, bathing, and the erection of new buildings

The Radap Rahayu is a ritual dance performed by the Banjar ethnic group, especially in the Gambut District, Banjar Regency which is used for the ethnic traditional rituals, such as weddings, bathing, and the erection of new buildings. This type of dance is recorded in the Hikayat Lambung Mangkurat (Hikayat Banjar) which is a court dance originated from Banjarmasin that was originally performed by a group of adult female dancers in odd numbers. The artistic performances in the district of Gambut contain deep ancient religious connections of the Banjarese with values related to God, where each performance can be seen through the elements of the dance, music, and offerings. Through the dance elements, the opening part is presented by its form of worship movements, followed by a kneeling position, and the head is slightly bowed with both hands in prayer position toward the centre, then upwards, and then back to the centre, while the opening positions depict an act of worship to God. In the closing part, the dancers return to a sitting position as a form of gratitude for the successful performance, which emphasises that the movement of the upper region (chest to head) has a spiritual character.

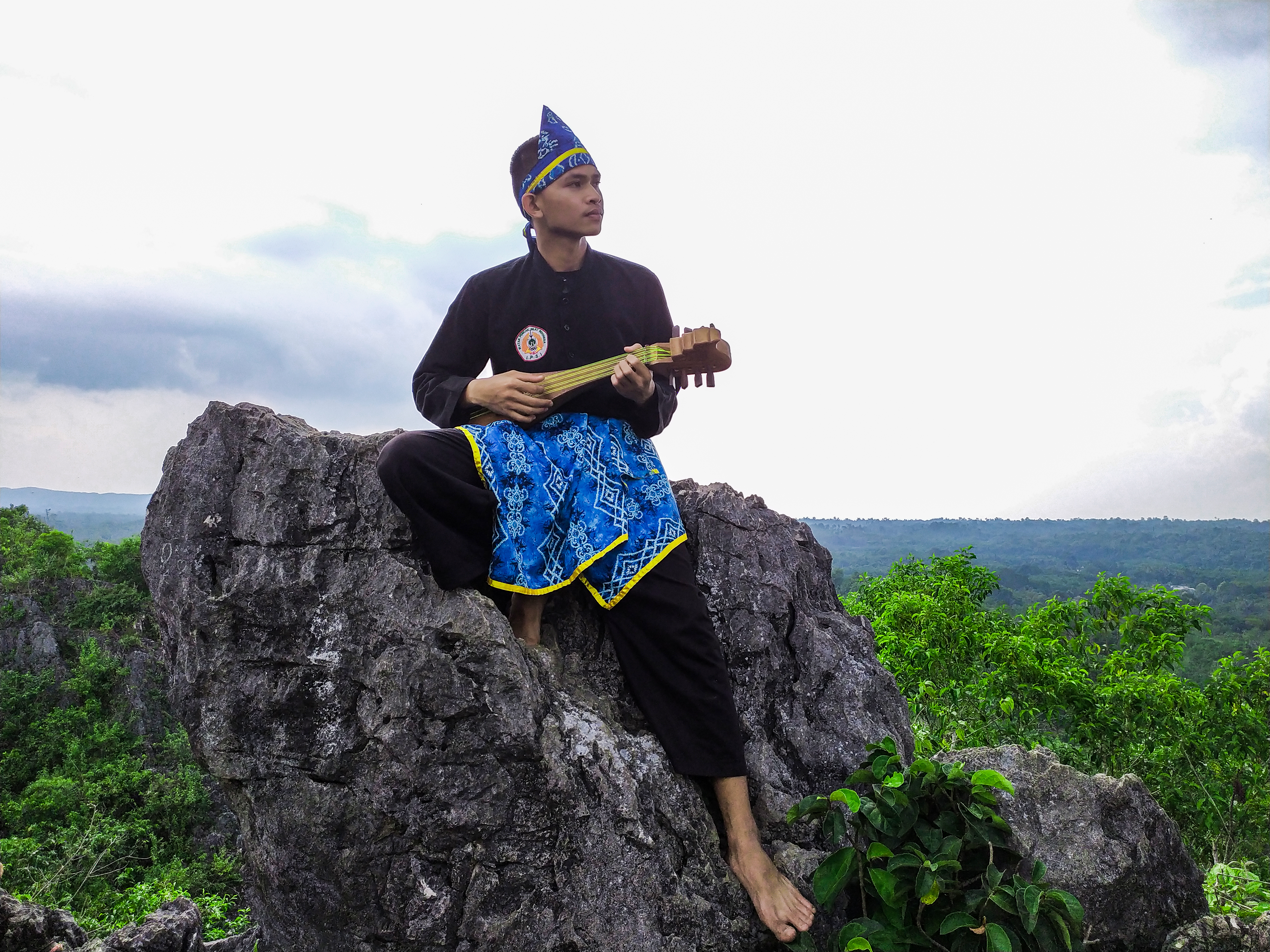
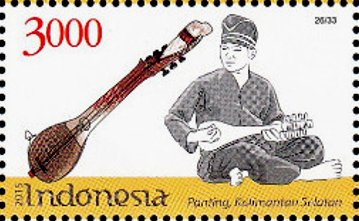
(Left) A Banjar man playing the panting musical instrument
(Right) The panting instrument appeared on the 2015 edition of Indonesian postage stamp

One of the traditional music arts of the Banjar people is musik panting, which is dominated by a chordophone musical instrument derived from the Dayak kecapi (zither) and later influenced by the Malay gambus (resembles the Arabic qanbūs, although smaller in size), with the instrument being called panting. The music originated from the Tapin region in South Kalimantan. In the past, it was played solo with only one person performing but as time progressed and musical tastes evolved, it was found that the music could be more captivating when played along with other instruments, and it is now commonly accompanied by other musical instruments such as the babun (gendang), agung (gong), and piul (violin), with several musicians performing together. The person who first gave it the name musik panting was A.W. Syarbaini, and until the present, the music remains a well-known traditional music form originating from the region and has become an inseparable part of the Banjarese cultural identity.

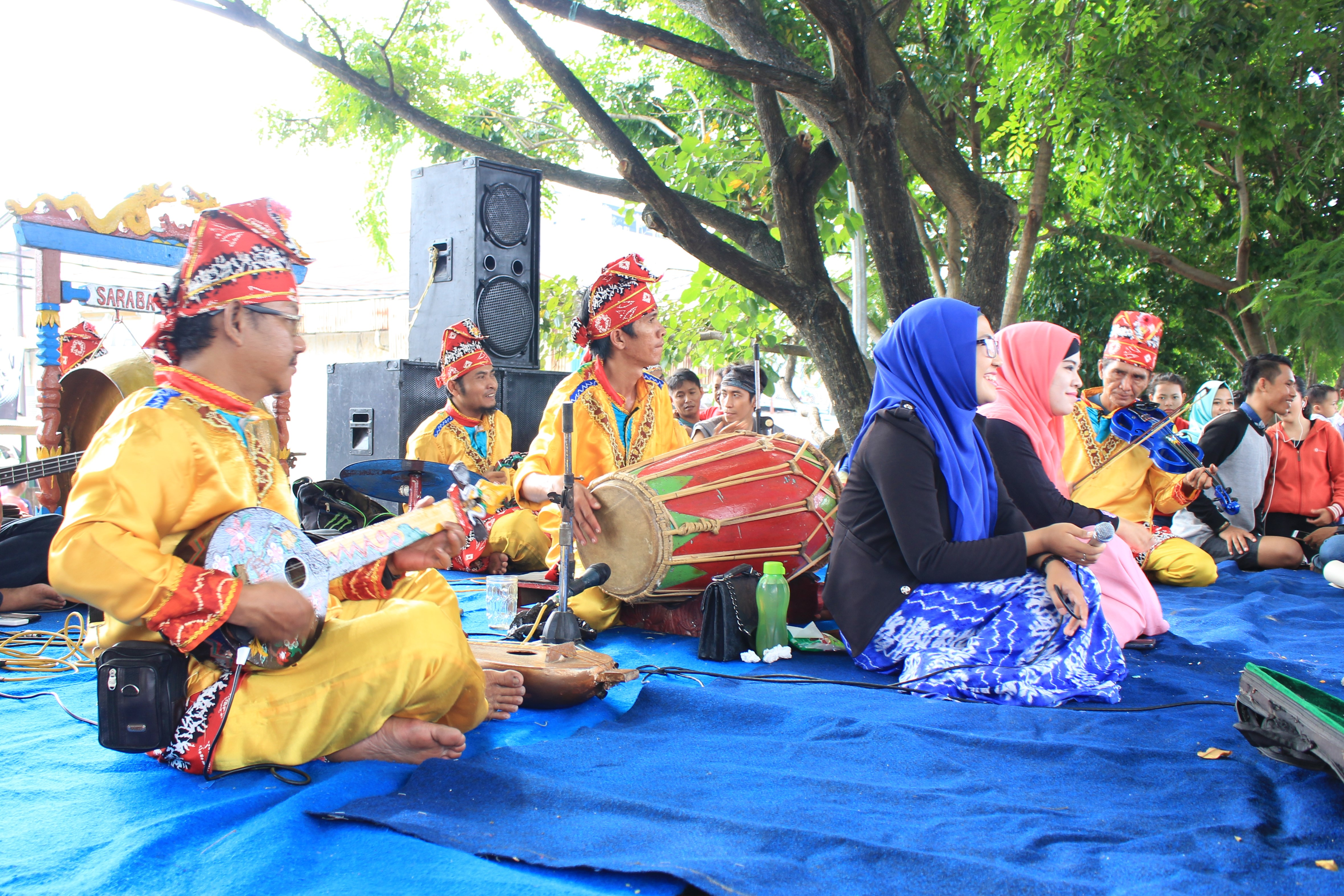
One of the Banjar panting music groups is performing in Banjarmasin

Another traditional music art of the Banjar people is called musik kintung which originates from the Banjar Regency, specifically from Sungai Alat village in Astambul and Bincau village in Martapura. It was adopted from the Bukit ethnic group (Meratus Dayak) and made from bamboo cut into three pieces called as kintung pieces. Usually the instrument consists of five pieces in one set, where it is played by taking them off one by one and ringing by hitting on the base made from round wood. The kintung consists of seven bamboo segments, each with a different section, and each of the segments has its own name, such as hintalu randah, hintalu tinggi, tinti pajak, tinti gorak, pindua randah, pindua tinggi, and gorak tuha. This form of musical art is, however, becoming increasingly rare due to modernisation, and in the past, it was especially played for rituals asking for rain. The musical art was also used in competitions in the past, with the result not only judged by the sound but also involving magical elements, such as whether the opponent's instrument would break or fail to produce sound during the contest. In recent times, the kintung musical instrument was usually played with other musical instruments, such as the agung, babun, and others, as accompaniment to traditional Banjar songs.

=== Traditional attire ===
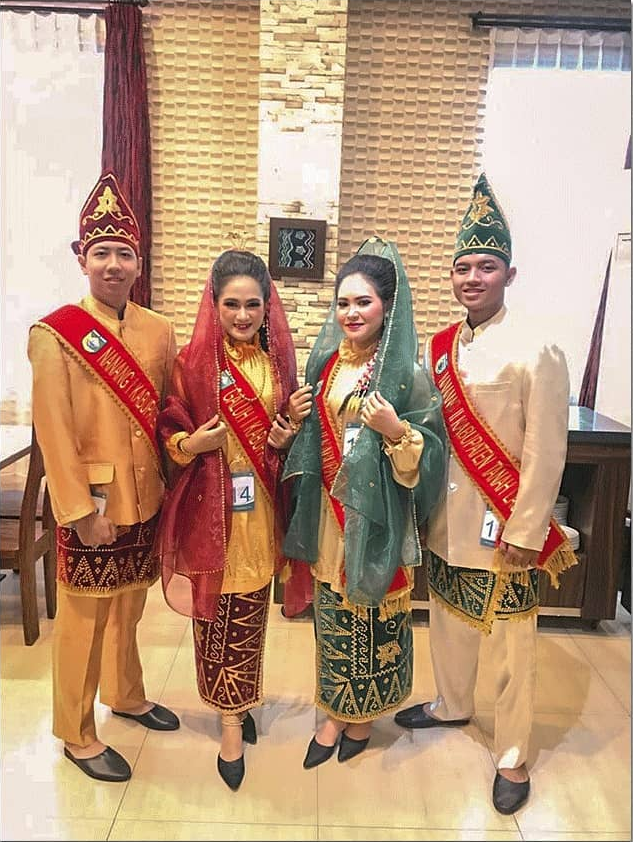
The annual youth Nanang Galuh Banjar event in Tanah Laut Regency, South Kalimantan, features the traditional attire of the Banjars

Traditional Banjar attire reflects the opulence and cultural acculturation of Dayak, Malay, Javanese, and Chinese cultures as well as the religious influence of Islam and Hinduism and is often worn at weddings and traditional ceremonies. The Banjarese are known for their specific textiles of Sasirangan, which originated from the word sirang or menyirang, which means to baste, a process that involves a basting stitch technique tied with raffia string before being dyed. Sasirangan motifs such as Gigi Haruan (snakehead fish), Hiris Gagatas (diamond shaped kue), or Kambang Sakaki are often worn as sarongs or as complementary scarves for the Kubaya Panjang (long shirt) and formal men's attire. During the time of the Banjarese sultanate era, the common clothing worn by males is the taluk balanga dress, while among females the neckless baju kurung is everyday clothing, similarly to the ethnic Malays. Among the most prominent are the Bagajah Gamuling Baular Lulut, Babaju Kun Galuh Pacinan, Baamar Galung Pancar Surya/Matahari, and Babaju Kubaya Panjang.

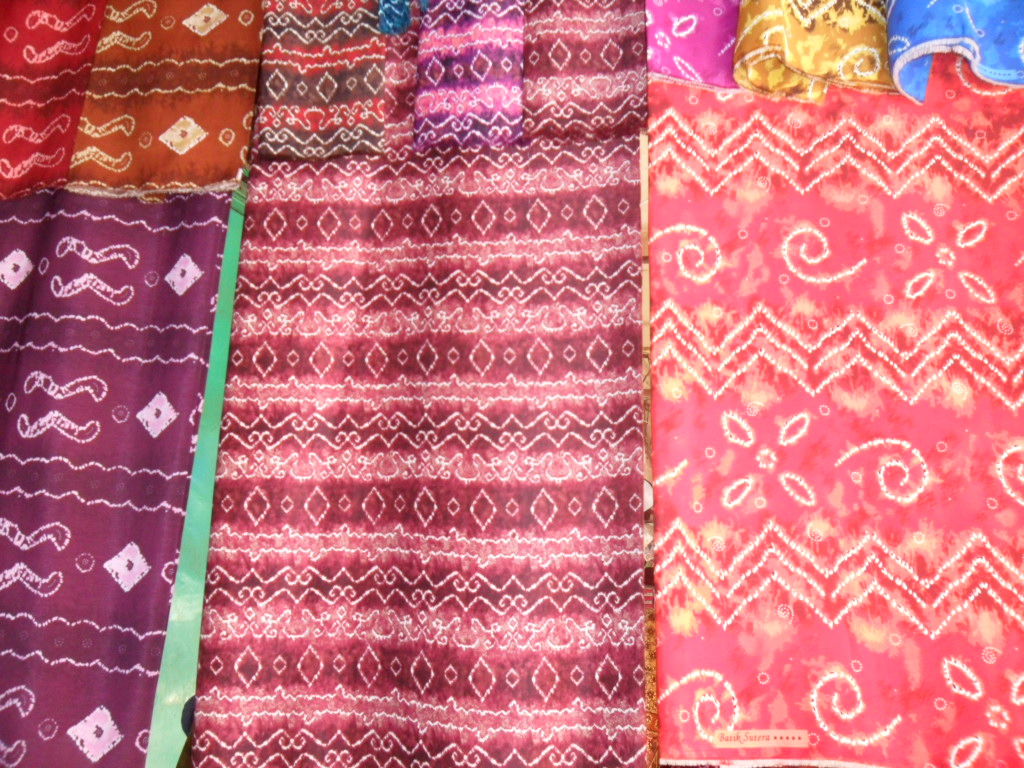
Sasirangan textiles of the Banjarese

Black velvet is often used to give a luxurious effect and contrast with gold jewellery, and the golden yellow colour symbolises nobility, while green symbolises coolness. The embroidered motifs of roses and jasmine symbolise the fragrance of virtue with common accessories such as the laung (hat) (male headband), sanggul (female bun), and gold jewellery. The Bagajah Gamuling Baular Lulut is wedding attire with heavy Hindu influences where the bride wears a kemben (udat) and her dress is adorned with sequins, wears a belt and a crown decorated with a garland of jasmine, rose, and clematis buds, while the lower part of the bride will wear a long cloth that transforms into a skirt; the groom, on the other hand, usually does not wear a pullover but only wears shorts combined with a cloth and belt; the Baamar Galung Pancar Surya/Matahari is a luxurious bridal attire influenced by both the Javanese and Hindu cultures, using velvet fabric with dragon or centipede-shaped beaded decorations; and the Babaju Kun Galuh Pacinan features a fusion of both Chinese and Middle Eastern cultures. The bride wears a cheongsam-style kebaya, while the man wears a robe and an laung sasirangan. Banjar traditional attire also includes various jewellery such as crowns, bracelets, rings, and belts, which are worn according to the type of clothing and the context in which they are worn and which contain specific symbolic meanings related to the wearer's image, authority, and social standing.

=== Marriage ===
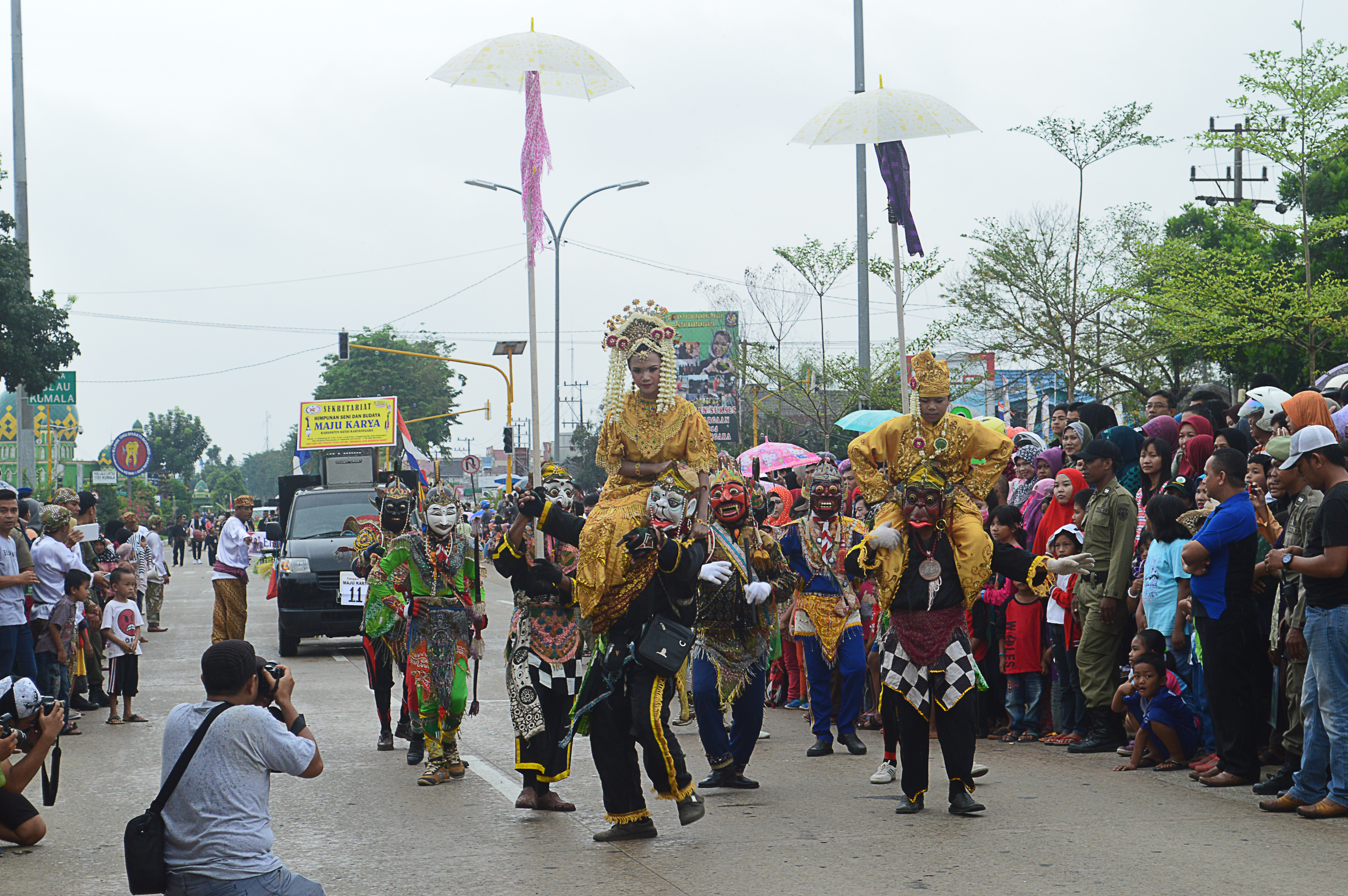
The Bausung with both the bride and groom being paraded, one of the six phases of Banjar marriage

In a traditional Banjar marriage, the dowry is featured on two distinct separations between mahar (religious dowry) and jujuran (customary money or goods), with the latter often being a substantial amount given by the groom to the bride's family to fund the wedding cost and the amount being negotiated based on their education, beauty, and social status, which often covers ceremony costs and household items. Banjar wedding traditions are rich with customs that combine the local culture with Islamic values, with phases such as basuluh (merisik or fact-finding), badatang (proposing marriage), maatar jujuran (dowry), bapapai (bathing in steam/scented water), as well and the peak customs of bausung (upholding the bride and groom) as well as batatai (sitting together on the bridal dais) with all the customs emphasising family respect and blessings.

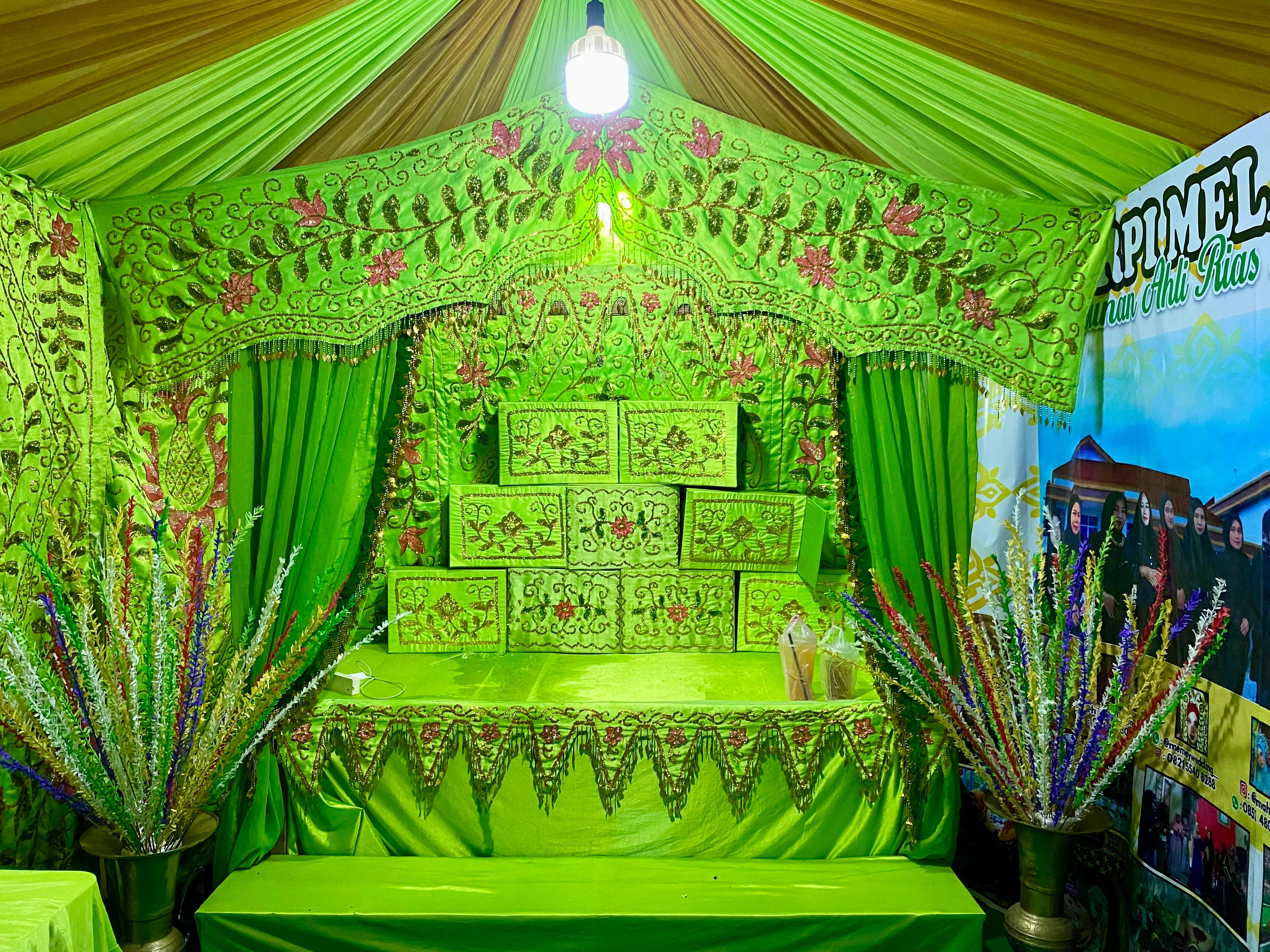
Banjar wedding stage (wedding dais) with air guci decorations

The Banjars had its own special wedding ritual called the batimung which is believed to cleanse and give blessings to the bride and groom, a ritual process that removes sweat from the body by steaming it with warm water infused with flowers and traditional Banjar spices, similar to a sauna or steam bath. The ritual is also a traditional treatment for patients with certain ailments since throughout the bathing session, prayers are recited. It is done to the bride and groom, who will soon be entering their wedding night, with both sitting on small chairs, wearing only sarongs with no underwear and exposing their entire bodies to the steam, which subsequently produces a healthy sweat due to the fragrance of flowers and spices during the processes. The ritual is usually performed a week or at least three days before the wedding to induce profuse sweating throughout their body so that the bride and groom will smell fragrant and sweat less, as well as to ensure both are healthier and more refreshed when they arrive at the wedding dais.

=== Cuisine ===
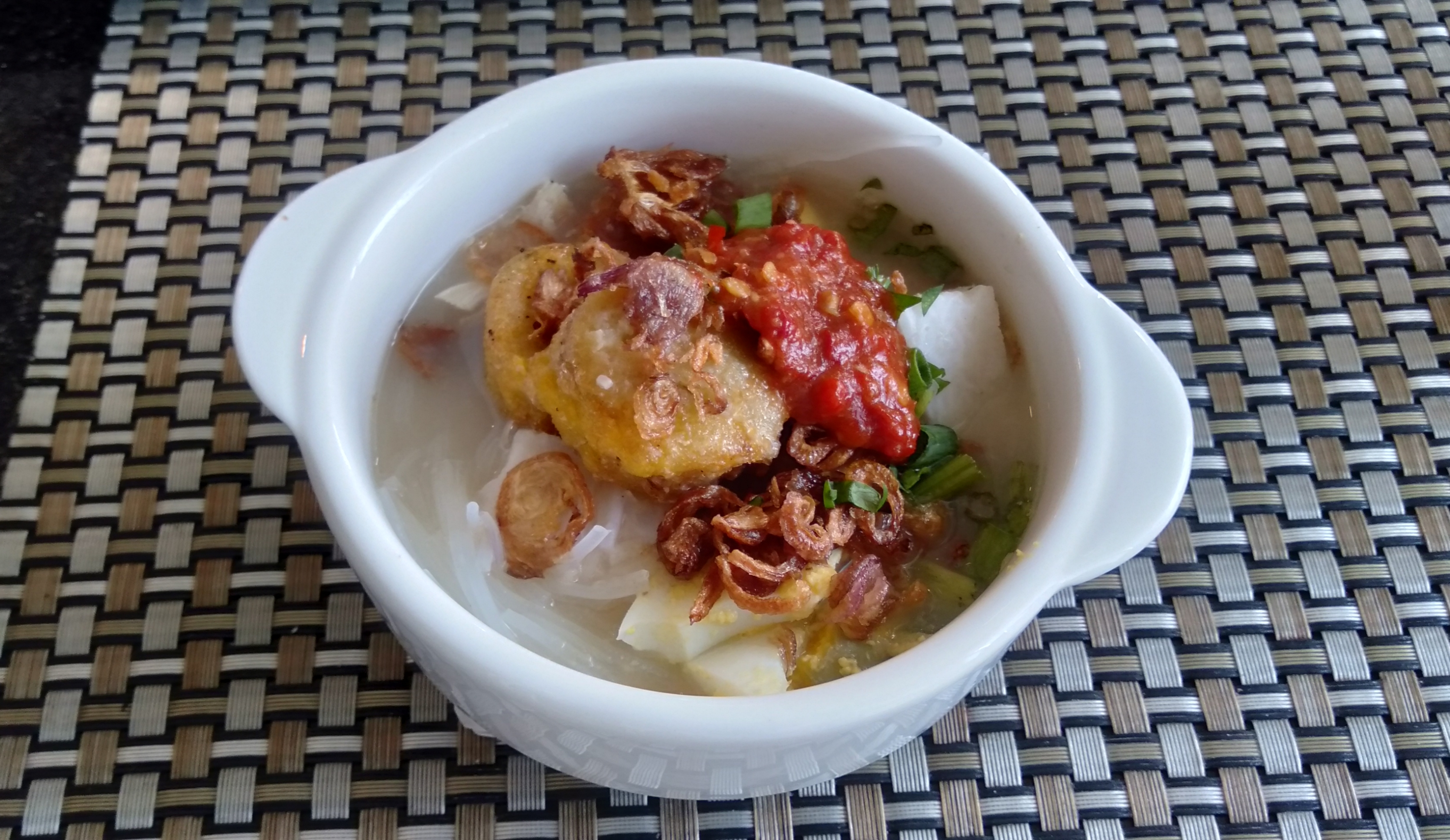
Soto Banjar, the main dish of the Banjarese

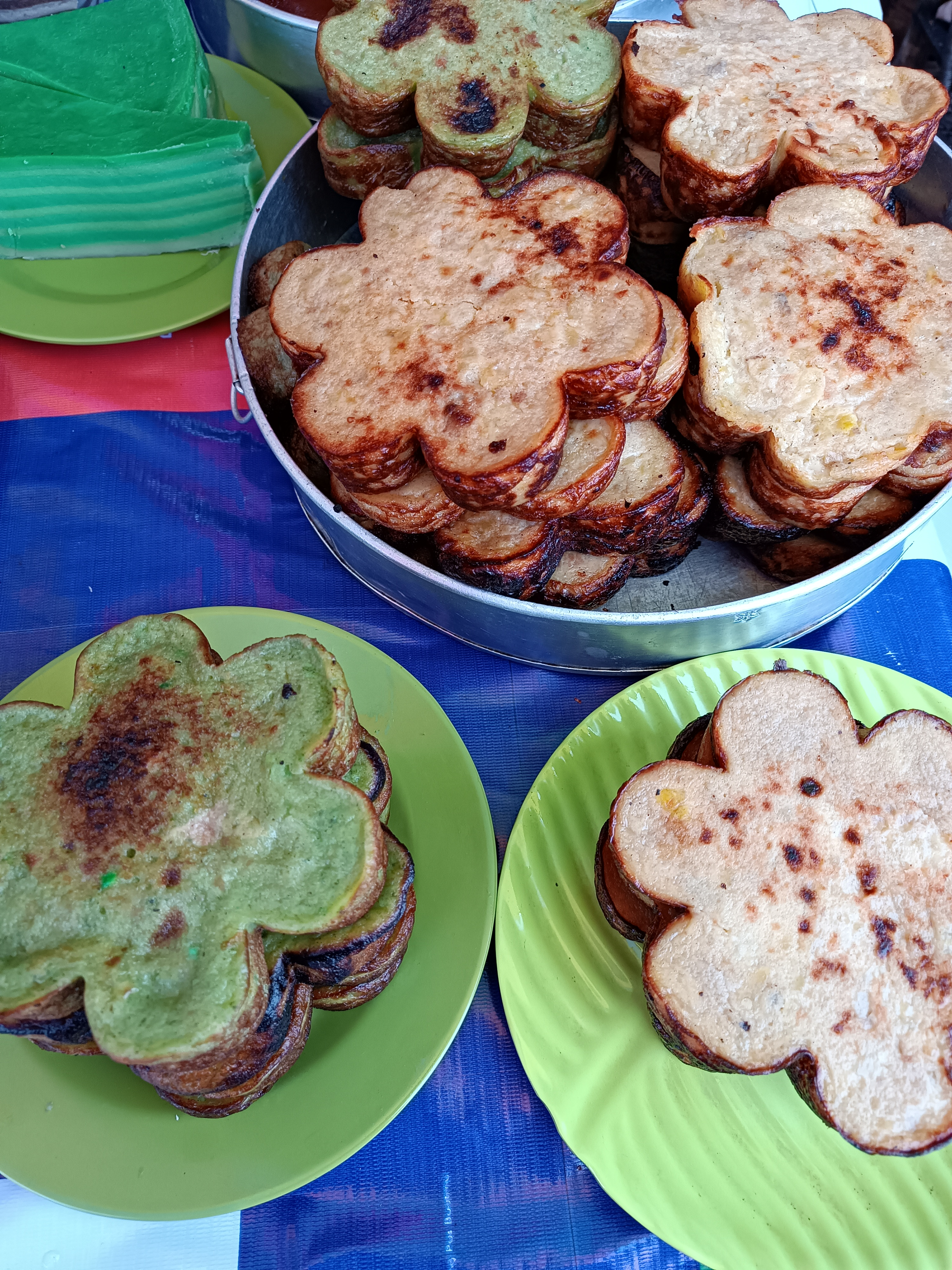
Bingka, a traditional kue of the Banjar people

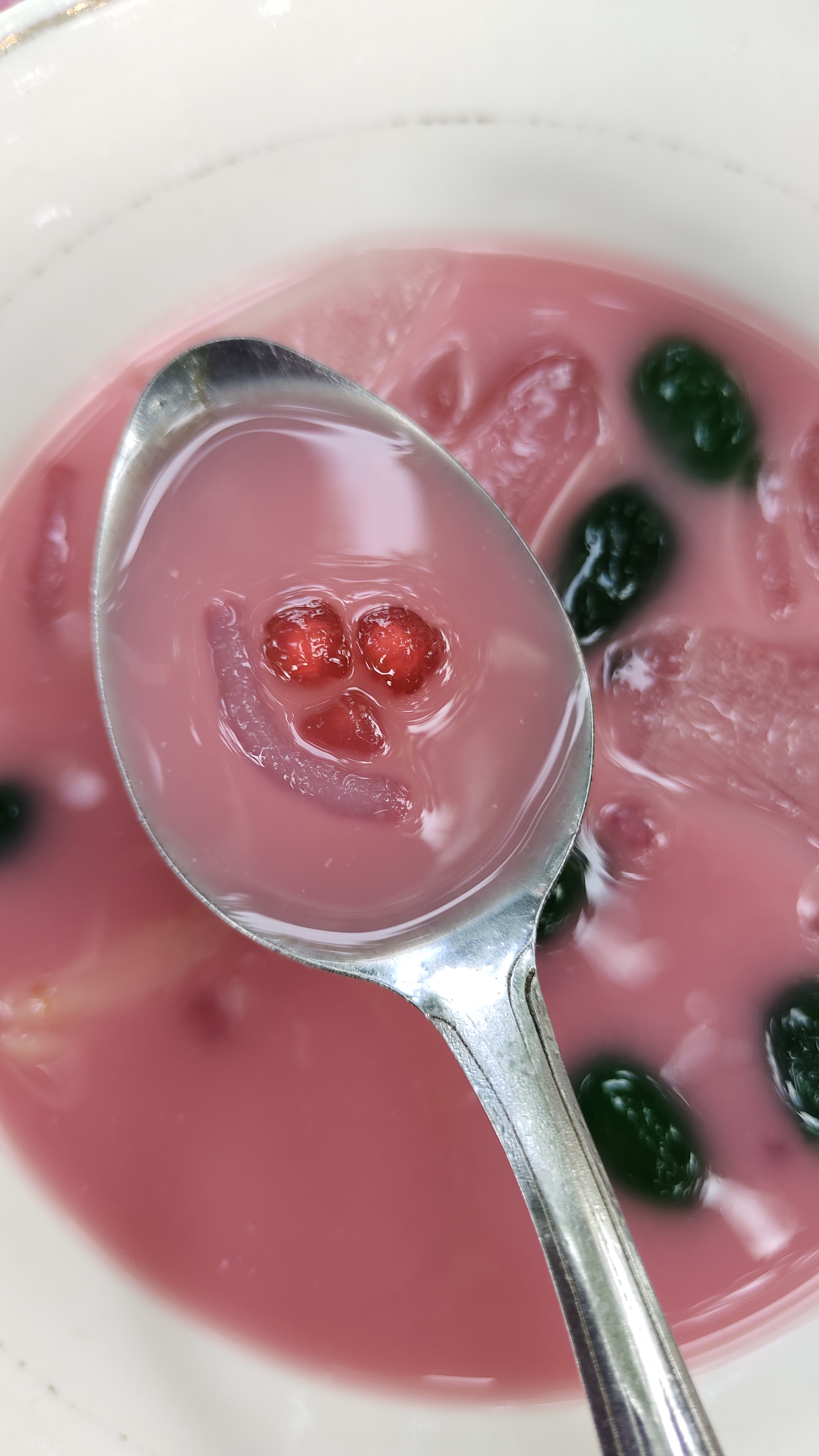
The Banjarese special es campur

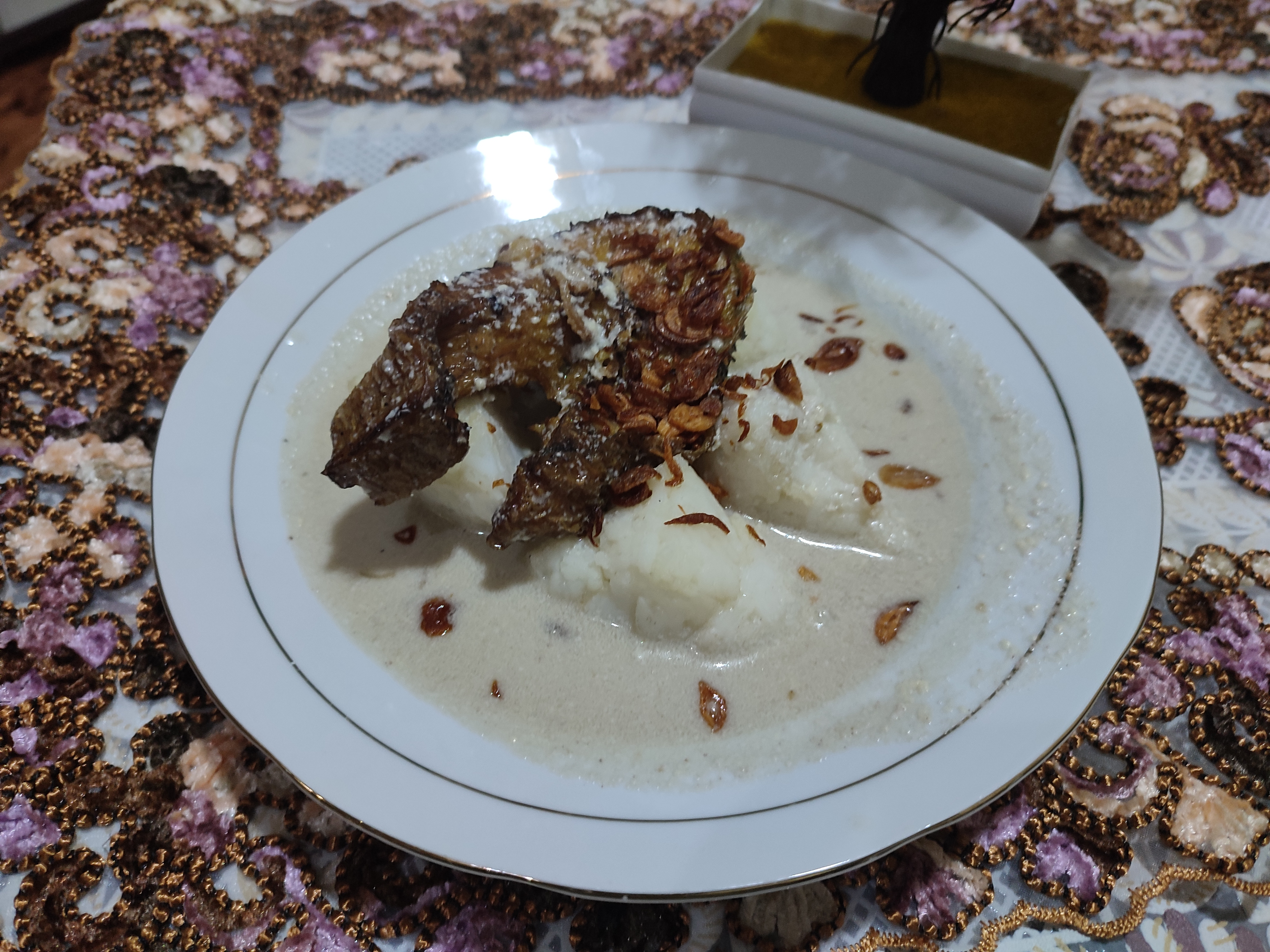
Ketupat kandangan of the Banjar

Banjar cuisine is known for its use of fragrant spices and a balance of sweet, fatty, and sour flavours. Main Banjarese dishes include the spicy Soto Banjar, ketupat kandangan, mandai (fermented Artocarpus integer (cempedak) skin), gangan paliat, lontong orari (also known as Banjar lontong), the sweet bingka kue, and the amparan tatak, reflecting a cultural fusion of Dayak, Malay, Javanese, Chinese, and Indian influences within Banjarese food culture. There are 41 types of Banjar kue (wadai) that are commonly served during Banjar traditional ceremony rituals, and bingka is one of them, where it is served during special celebrations, such as weddings, births, and Ramadan. There's a philosophy behind the bingka kembang goyang motif where "It depicts human life, which isn't always smooth sailing with ups and downs, happy times and sad times". Based on widely accepted stories among the Banjar community, the original bingka recipe was first created by the Banjarese Princess Junjung Buih of the Negara Dipa kingdom, who was the ancestor of Sultan Surianshah of the Sultanate of Banjar before their kingdom Islamisation. Among the Banjarese community in the Kerian District of Perak, Malaysia, a coconut bingka kuih known as kalakatar is popular throughout the month of Ramadan, and its name is a combination of two words, namely kala, which means "present", and katar, which carries the meaning of "hot" in the Banjar language. The wadai kipeng/kiping, which consists of glutinous rice pellets, is popular among the Banjarese in the southern part of the Malay Peninsula in Parit Jawa, Johor as well as Singapore. Another Banjar kue, the amparan tatak, is popular, especially in South, Central and East Kalimantan, where it is made from a mixture of rice flour, coconut milk, sugar and bananas (usually horn bananas or taro), producing a soft texture with a sweet and savoury taste.

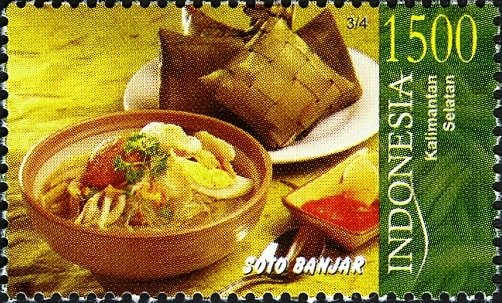
Banjarese symbolic cuisine in a 2005 Indonesian postage stamp edition

The Soto Banjar usually consists of rice vermicelli noodles with chicken meat, boiled egg, potato fritters, as well as ketupat, and when it is served with rice than ketupat, it becomes Sup Banjar (Banjar soup). The Banjarese version of soto has been around since the 16th century, influenced by Chinese cuisine through trade. The ketupat kandangan, which originated from Kandangan of South Hulu Sungai Regency, has been around since the 18th century and is made using the finest local rice of South Kalimantan with a thick spice sauce with coconut milk coupled with a piece of smoked snakehead fish. Within the Banjarese of South Kalimantan, the mandai, which is a fermented cempedak skin, gains more popularity than the fruit inside, where it can be stored for months and served fried or stir-fried. The gangan paliat is a special dish among the Banjarese people in Paliat village of Kelua Sub-district, Tabalong Regency, that uses various types of catfish such as hemibagrus (baung), snakehead fish, and even prawn mixed with coconut gravy, fresh lime juice, and turmeric. The lontong orari (Banjar lontong) is widely consumed and sold by the Banjar community, either in their restaurants or as street food. The region also has its own duck breed species called the Alabio duck (Itik banar), which is a crossbreed between local regional ducks and the Pekins, whose meat is often served grilled with various local spices and served boneless in small cuts. The Banjar ethnic group also features a drink called es campur Banjar, a delightful ice dessert featuring an assortment of toppings such as grass jelly, nata de coco, and various other fruit ingredients combined with coconut milk, evaporated milk, and condensed milk as a refreshment throughout a hot day.

=== Religion ===
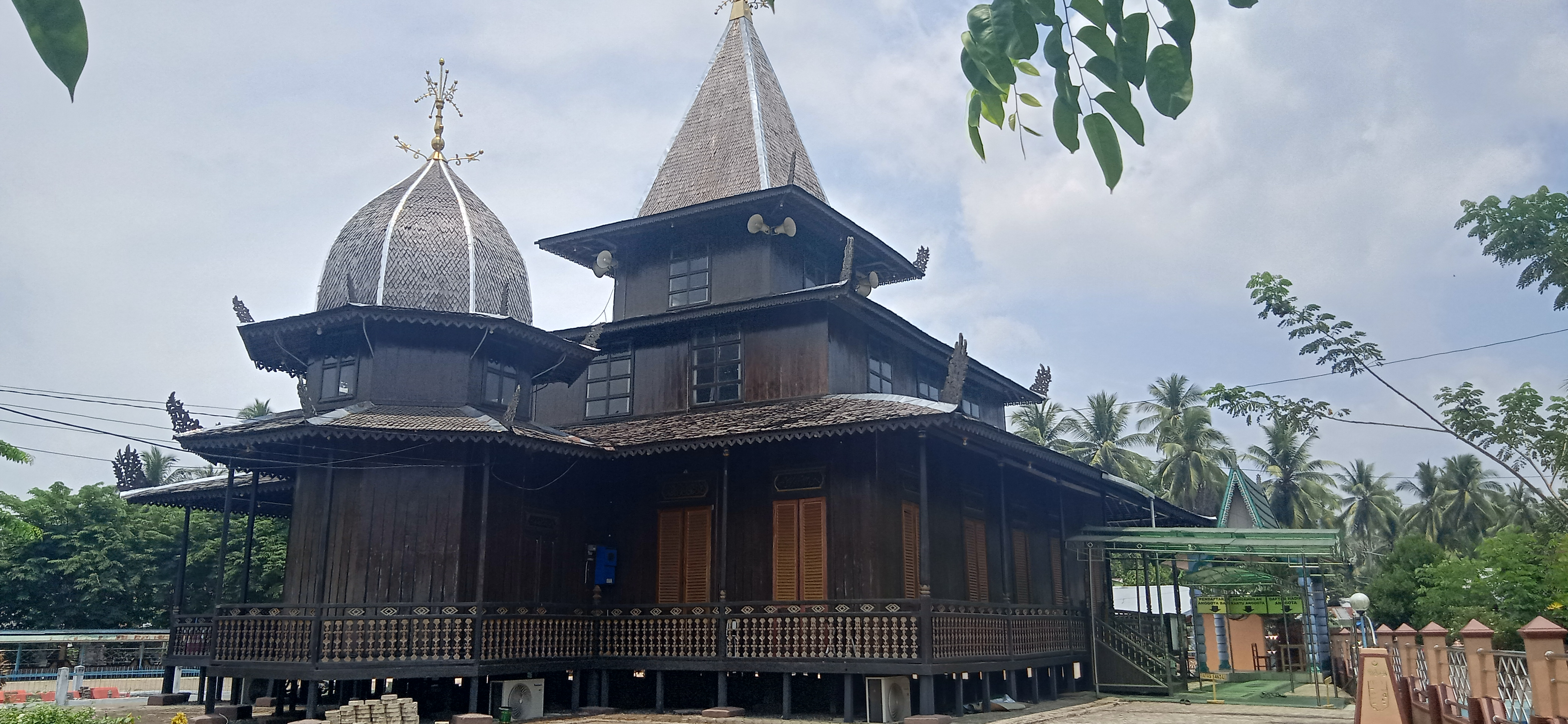
A traditional mosque with the stilt house architectural style of the Banjar people

The early ancestors of the present-day Banjar ethnic group followed either Animism, Buddhism or Hinduism. Since the Islamisation of the Banjarese kingdom in the 16th century, the majority of Banjarese are adherents of Islam, despite a minority of Banjarese also following Christianity of Roman Catholics. Islam has been a central pillar of social and spiritual life of the majority Banjarese ethnic since the massive Islamisation of their kingdom through Sultan Surianshah, replacing previous beliefs with Islamic values permeate the culture, such as the philosophy of baiman (faith in God), bauntung (having life skills), and batuah (benefiting others). One of the common branches of Islam partly practised by the Banjars was formerly Shia Islam, but after the return of the Banjar religious leader, Sheikh Muhammad Arsyad al-Banjari from Mecca of the Emirate of Diriyah in 1774, with subsequent religious systematisation and dawah, most Banjarese now adhere to Sunni Islam of the Shafi'i school. Present-day Banjar culture is steeped in Islamic values, including life-cycle ceremonies such as the badudus (bathing ritual to purify the bride and groom), batasmiah (giving name to newborn), baayun mulud (swaddling/swinging child during the month of Mawlid), and bakhitan (circumcision).

=== Traditional house ===
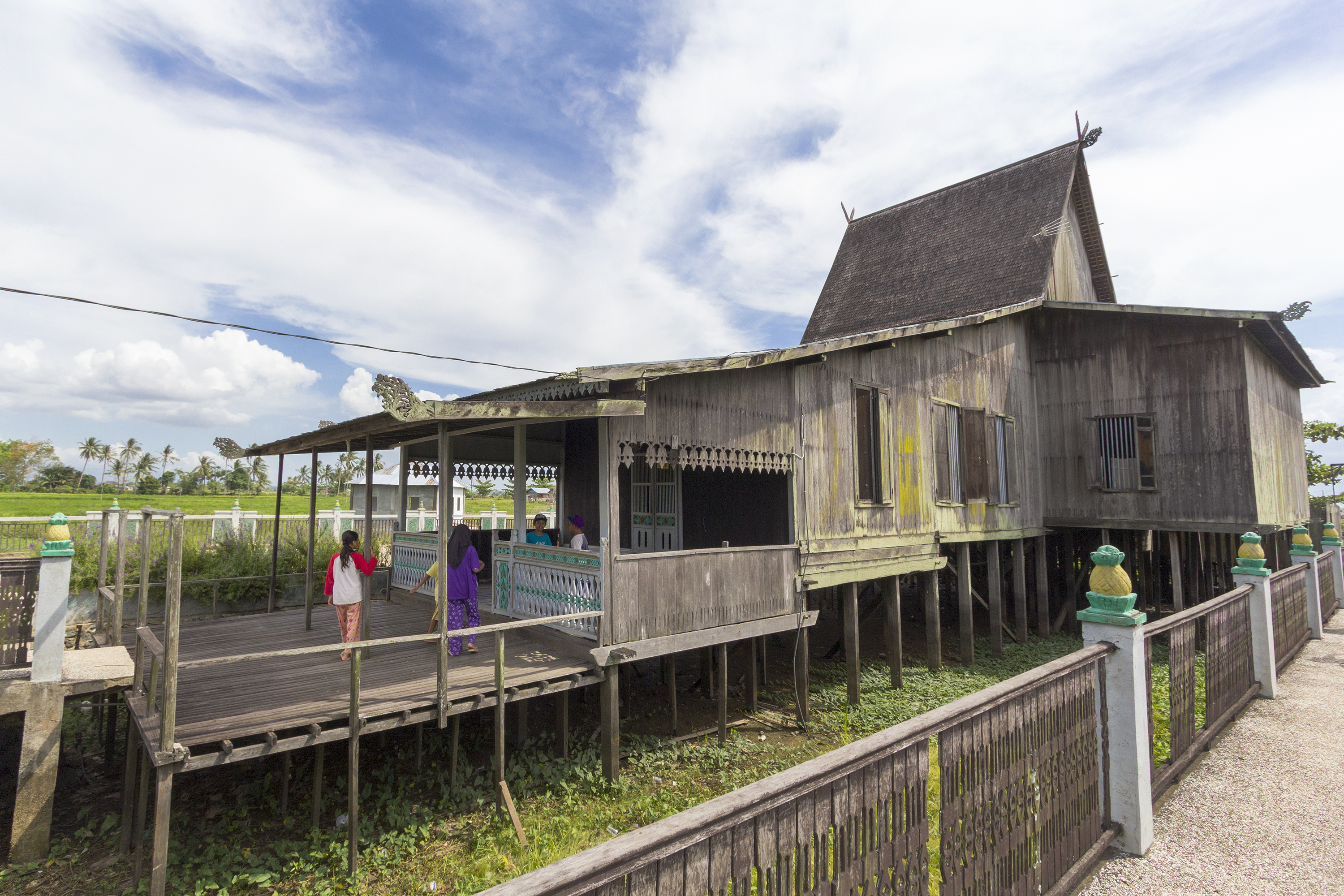
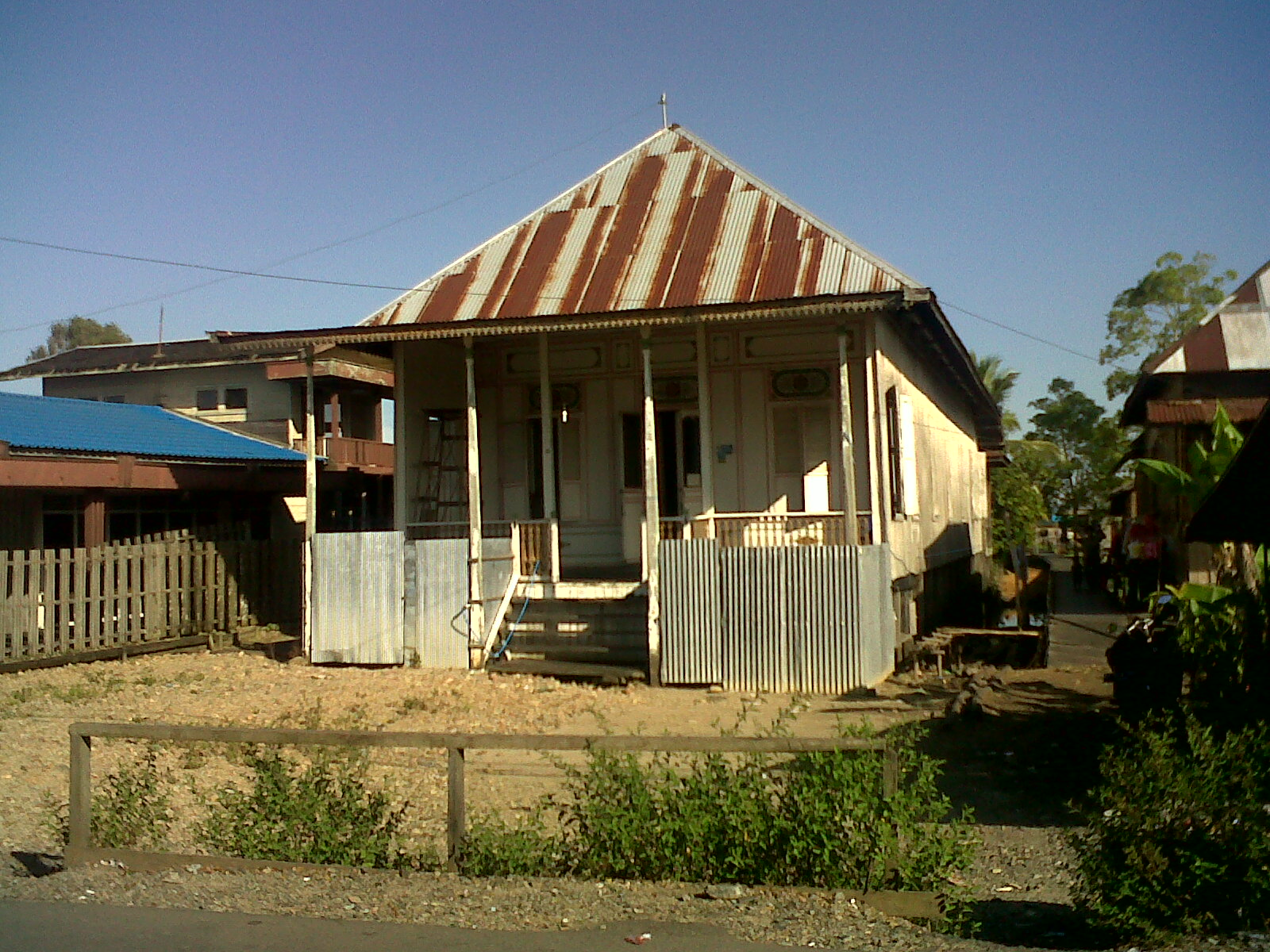
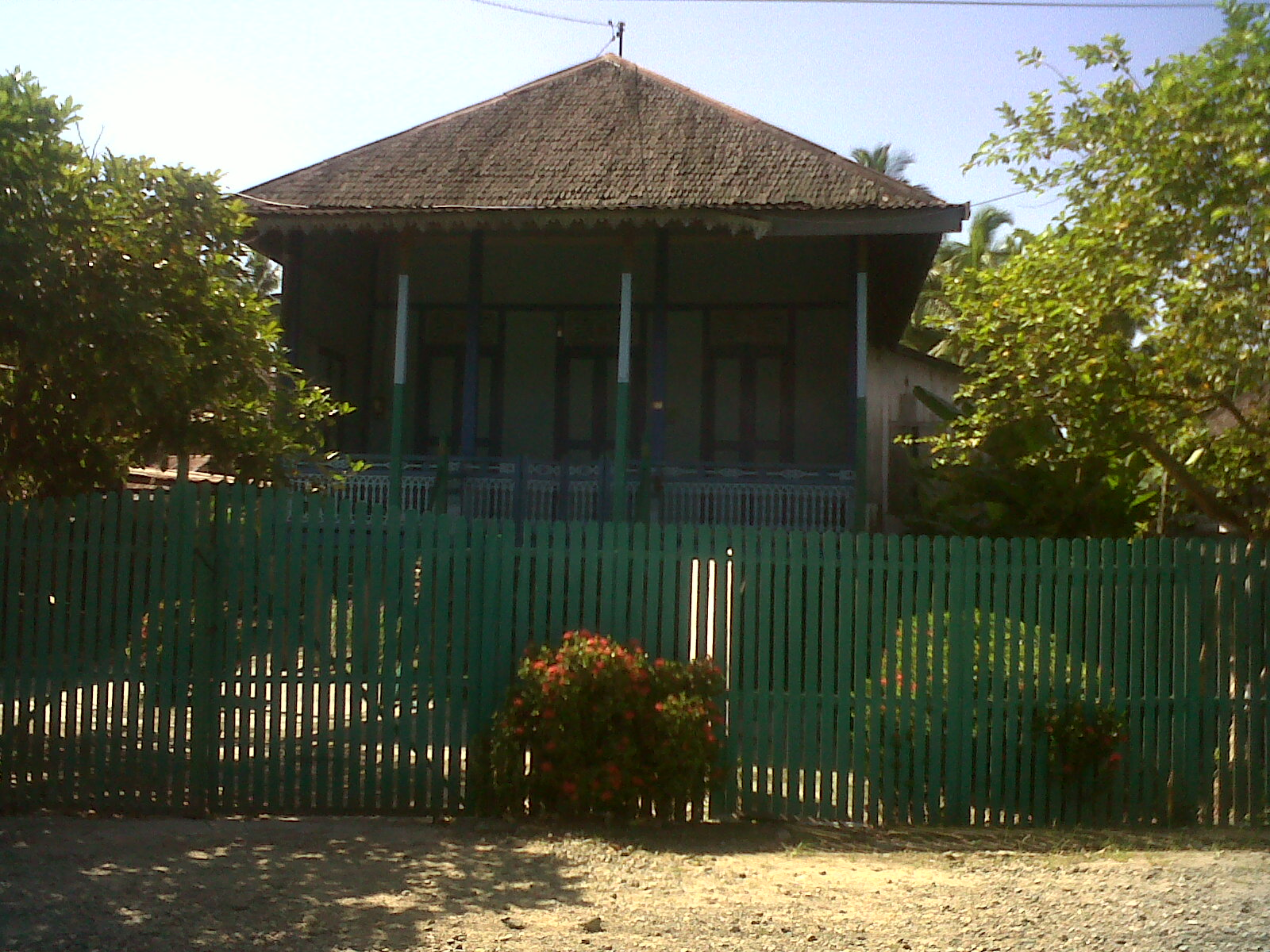
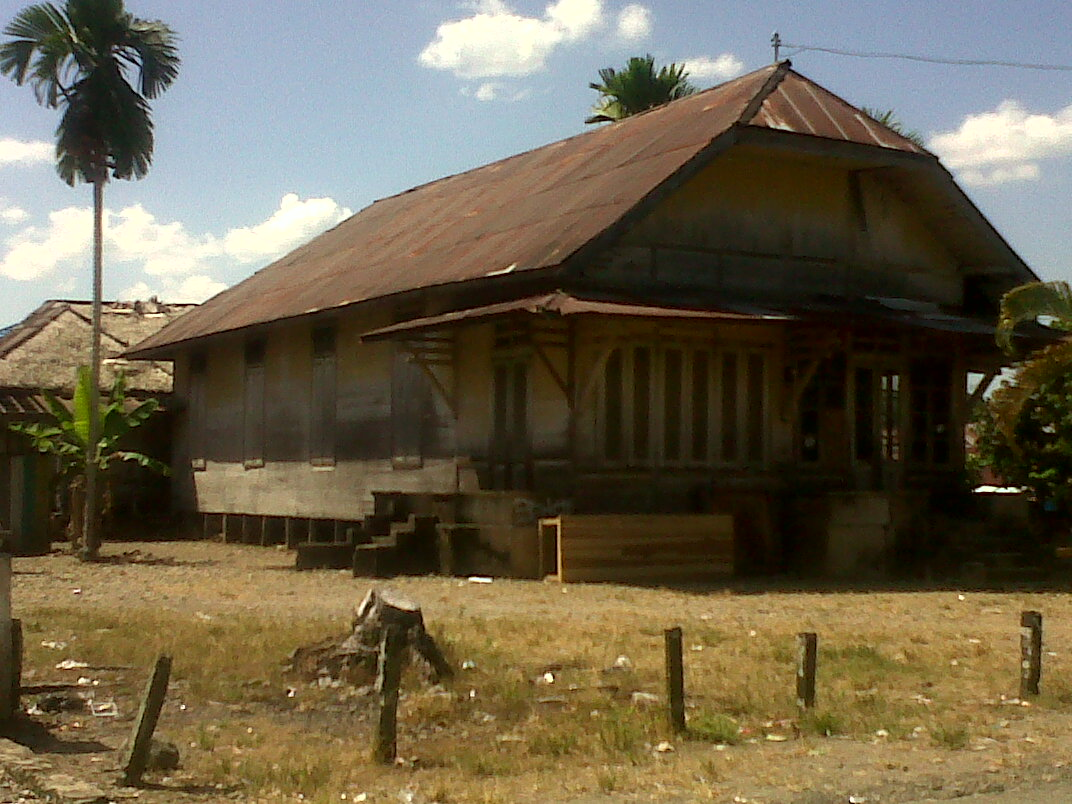
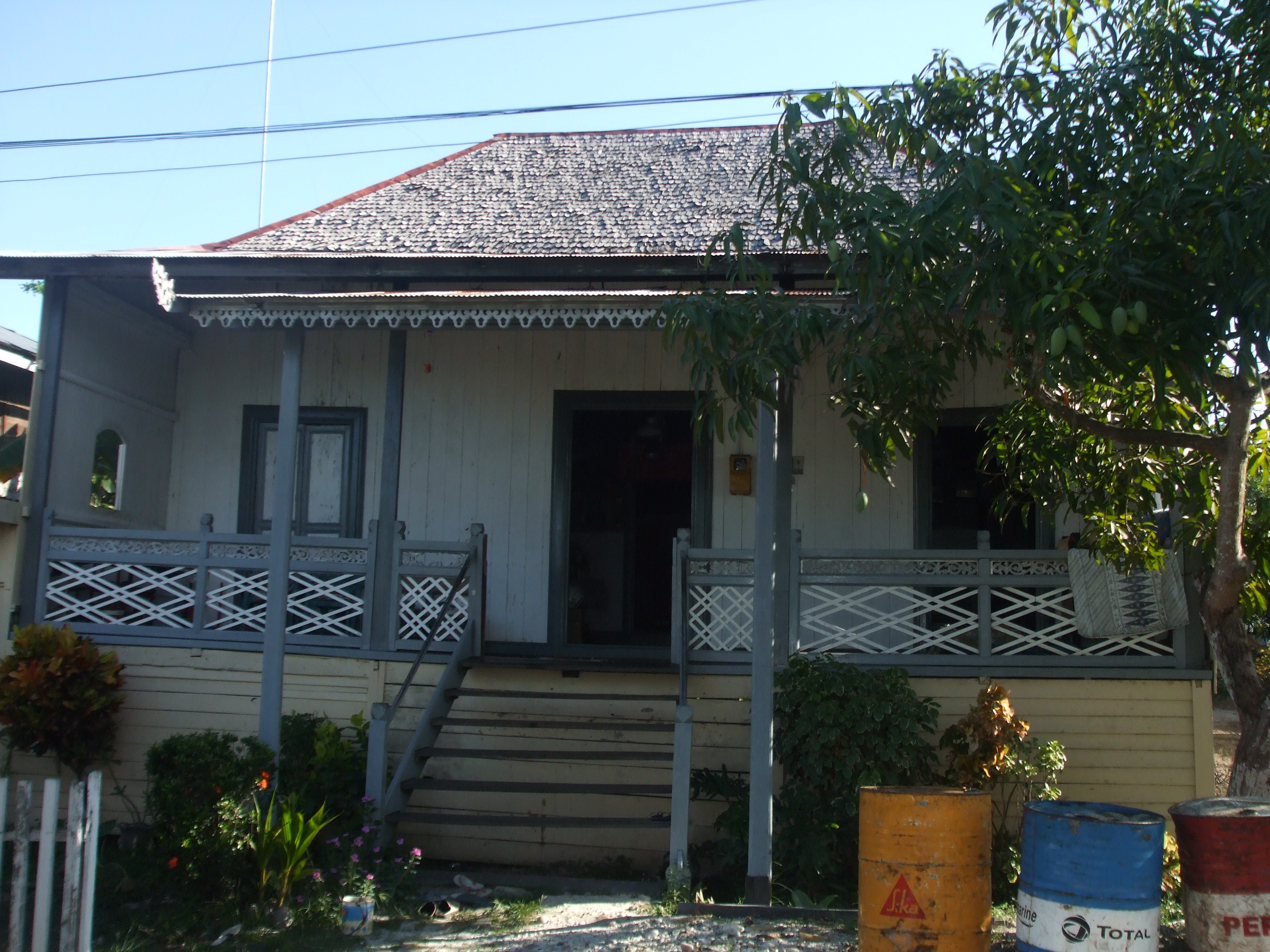
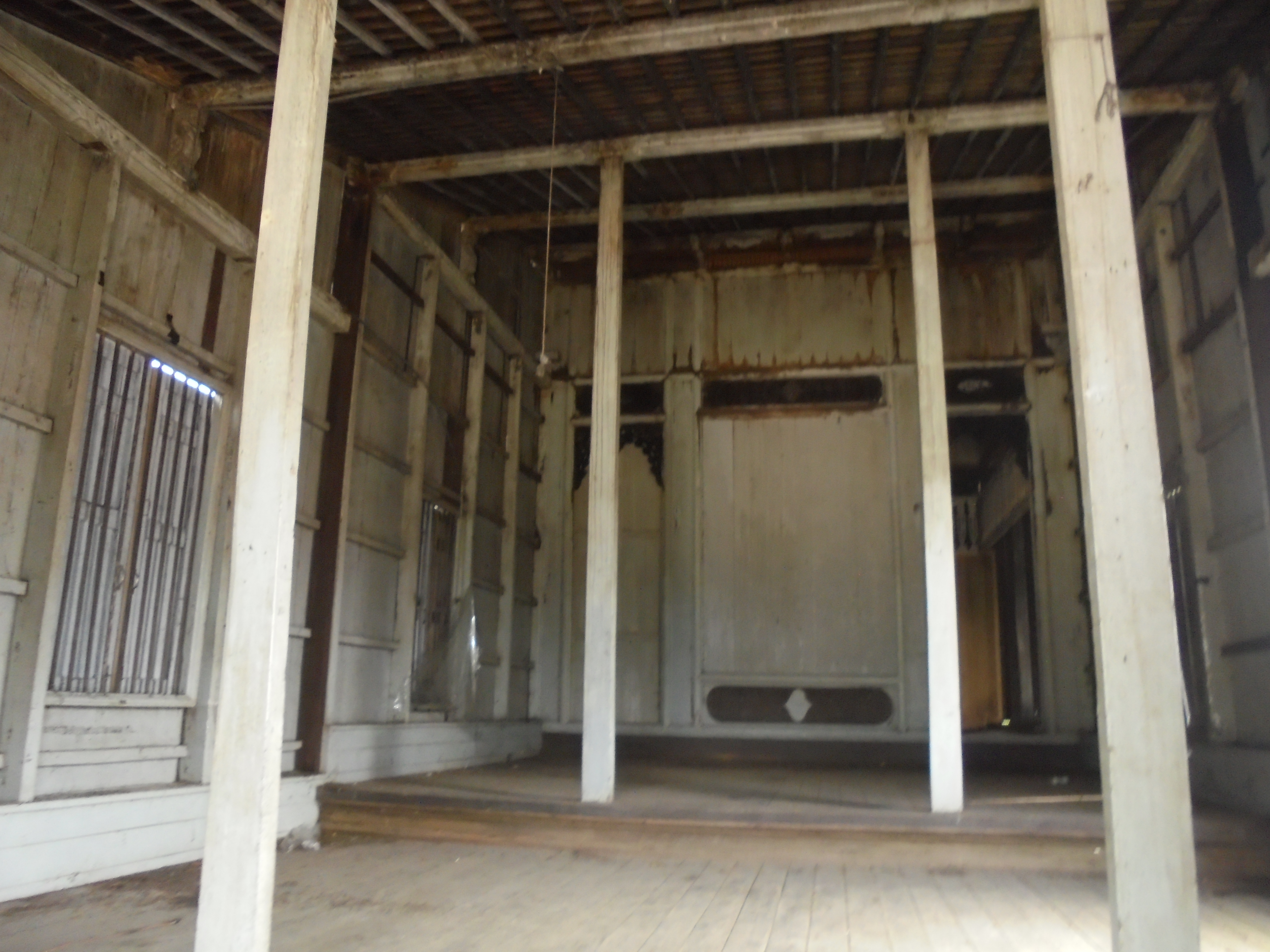
From clockwise: Palimasan (Gajah house) without porch (anjung) in Habirau, South Daha, South Hulu Sungai Regency, Gajah Manyusu house in Birayang, South Batang Alai, Central Hulu Sungai Regency, Joglo Gudang house in Marabahan, Barito Kuala, Balai Bini house with four pillars in Pamangkih, North Labuan Amas, Central Hulu Sungai Regency, Bubungan Tinggi house of Selong Ulu Bay, West Martapura, Banjar, and reception room of a Banjar traditional house

Traditional Banjar architecture is characterised by symbolic elements, emphasis on the roof, ornamental and decorative designs, the use of ulin (Eusideroxylon) wood as the primary building material, and a symmetrical layout. The elements are motivated by several indigenous tribal or group cultures that perform and shape the culture of the Banjarese tribe. It has distinct styles and carvings that began to develop before 1871 and continued until 1935, and among the various types of Banjar houses, the Bubungan Tinggi holds the highest status and is the most well-known with a high-pitched 45-degree roof, as it was once the residence of the Banjarese king and remains the iconic traditional house of the Banjar people. Other types of Banjar houses include the Anjung Surung, Balai Bini, Balai Laki, Gajah Baliku, Gajah Manyusu, Joglo Gudang, Lanting, Palimasan, Palimbangan, and Tadah Alas, among others. Many of the historical Banjarese traditional houses are continually being preserved by the East Kalimantan Cultural Heritage Conservation Centre (BPCB) team of the Kalimantan Work Area to ensure cultural preservation of the ethnic.

The Anjung Surung is characterised by its saddle roofs that push or extend forward and distinct side wings (anjung) featuring roofs positioned pushing forward, the Balai Bini by its rectangular structure with a high roof, an anjung on both the left and right and a roof that typically features two distinct tiers with the lower roof sloping down from the main structure where it is historically used as a residence for the king's daughters or for their close relatives, the Balai Laki which include a raised wooden structure and a large, open, central main hall built for official functions, the Gajah Baliku with symmetrical anjung, no exterior paint, and bioclimatic features such as cross-ventilation, shaded terraces, and elevated wood-based construction formerly used for royal relatives, the Gajah Manyusu is renowned for its distinctive design mimicking a mother elephant nursing her calf, Joglo Gudang features a Banjar house that incorporates Javanese architectural styles, the Lanting which is a floating house common among the Banjar who adapted to riverine life, the Palimasan that once served as homes for high officials suited for riverine or swamp environments with a pyramid-shaped roof (limas) with a rectangular layout, the Palimbangan which historically designated for religious leaders and wealthy merchant that offers cooling, with wind able to reach the interior and the Tadah Alas which resembles the Balai Bini house, featuring a stilted structure with a distinct roof layout that acts as a shelter.

=== Language ===
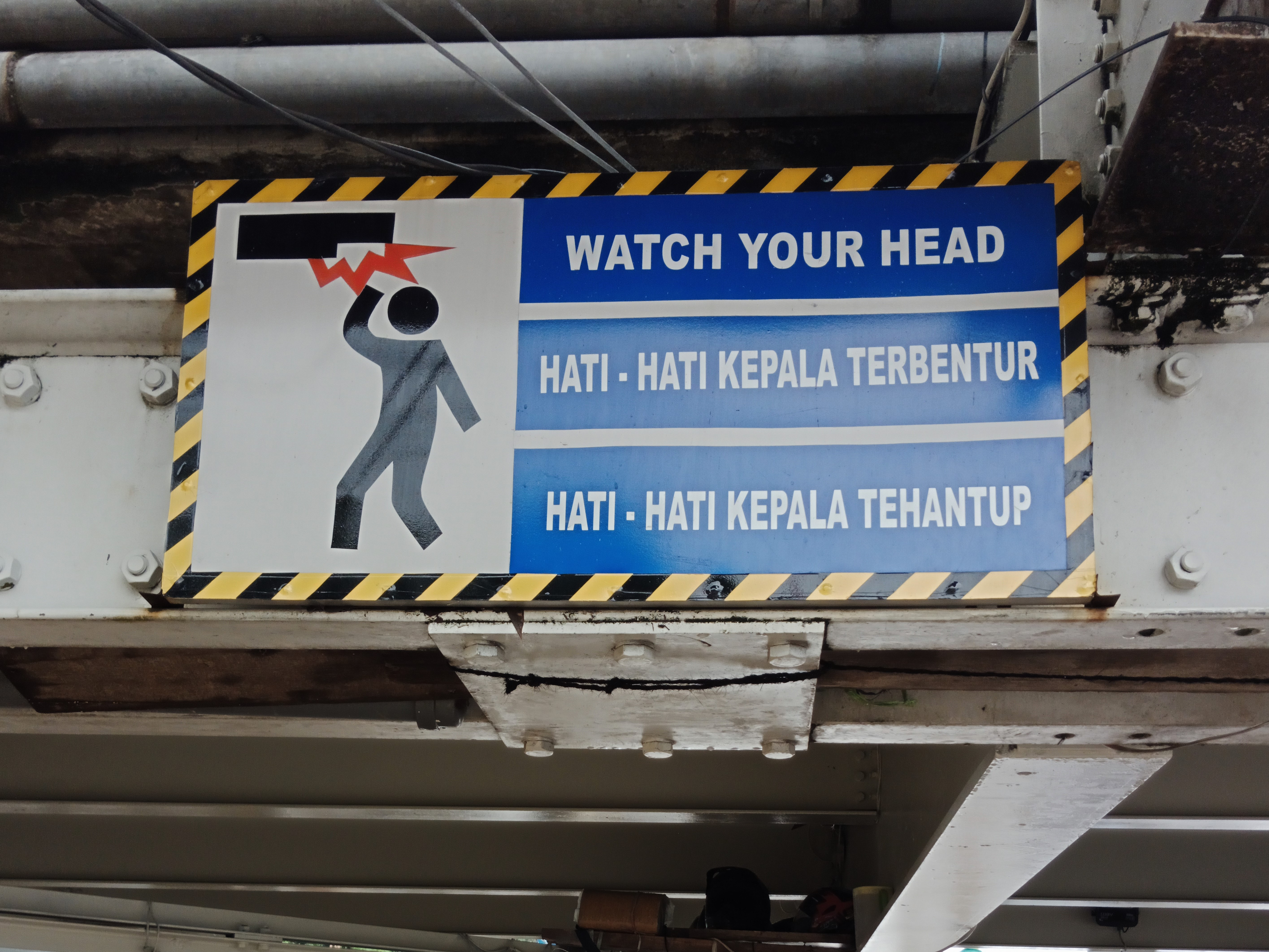
A trilingual English-Indonesian-Banjar sign in Banjarmasin of South Kalimantan

The native language of Banjarese people is Banjarese language (Basa Banjar; Jaku Banjar), it is an Austronesian language of the Malayic branch predominantly spoken in the southeastern Kalimantan regions. The Banjarese language is the de facto lingua franca for various indigenous community especially in South Kalimantan, as well as Central Kalimantan (notably in Seruyan Regency and Sukamara Regency) and East Kalimantan in general. The Banjar language is largely derived from Malay, while the Indonesian language also adopted a lot of Malay. The Banjar language of South Kalimantan is acknowledged to be heavily influenced by Malay and Dayak languages, which can be viewed from a phonological and morphological perspective, with Banjar within the region classified into two linguistic types: the Hulu Banjar and Kuala Banjar. The Hulu Banjar recognised three vowels, such as "a, i, and u", while the Kuala Banjar has six vowels of "a, i, u, e, o, and e`". The language of the Banjar people in Kutai of East Kalimantan is said to share more than 90% of the vocabulary with the Brunei Malay/Kedayan languages of northern Borneo, with the Banjarese separated from both the Brunei Malay and Kedayan for 400 years with similar adherence to Islam. Both the Kedayans and the Banjarese are related, to a certain extent, because of the similarities in their languages. The vocabulary of the Malagasy language also largely originated from the Ma'anyan, of whom 90% are found to be closely related, and from whom the Banjar are also descended.

The following texts are the Universal Declaration of Human Rights in Banjarese language along with the original declaration in English:

Banjarese

Sabarataan urang dilahirakan mardeka wan baisi martabat wan hak-hak nang sama.
Buhannya dibarii akal wan hati nurani wan saharusnya bagaul satu wan nang lainnya dalam sumangat parsaudaraan.

Translation:
English

All human beings are born free and equal in dignity and rights.
They are endowed with reason and conscience and should act towards one another in a spirit of brotherhood.

== Relations with Dayaks ==
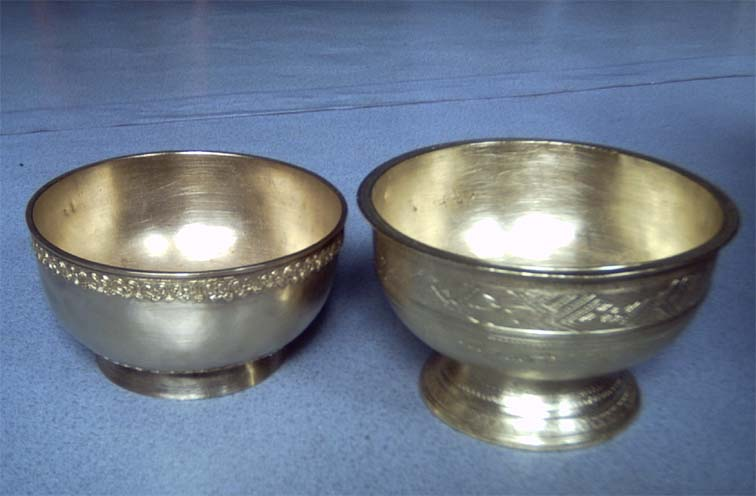
Sasanggan, a bronze bowl used by the Banjarese during a traditional ceremony

The relationship between the Banjar people and the indigenous Dayaks are closely related. Some Dayaks who had converted to Islam or migrated to coastal areas without converting their religion have also assimilated into the Banjar culture and call themselves Banjar. Both the Banjars and the Dayaks also think of themselves as brothers and sisters, despite the fact that the Dayaks are majority Christians while the Banjars are mostly Muslims. This is further strengthened by the fact there are many intermarriages between the Banjars and the Dayaks, even among the members of the royalty. For example, Biang Lawai, a wife of a Banjar king, was of Ngaju Dayak ethnicity, which subsequently resulted in some Banjarese kings and queens having Dayak lineage in their blood.

Based on the Meratus Dayak legends, Meratus and Banjarese are descendants of related brothers of Datung Ayuh or Sandayuhan, who was the ancestor of the Meratus Dayak, and Bambang Basiwara or Intingan, who was the ancestor of the Banjarese. In the legends, Sandayuhan is strong and good at fighting, while Intingan has a weaker physique but greater intelligence. Through the close relationship, this also reflects the recognition of Banjar authority among the Meratus Dayaks. This relationship grew strong when both ethnicities were affected by some policies throughout the colonisation by the Dutch in the 18th century. Some of the warriors involved in the Banjar War are of Dayak ethnicity or have Dayak lineage in their blood, with many of the Dayaks who adhere to animism of Kaharingan siding with the Banjarese, although other Christian Dayaks also sided with the Dutch.

== See also ==
- Banjar Malaysians
- Banjar Singaporeans

== Notes and references ==
=== Bibliography ===
- Selections from the Asiatic Journal and Monthly Register for British India and Its Dependencies: Vols 1-13, January 1816 to June 1822. Higginbotham & Company. 1875.
- Catholic Encyclopedia. Appleton. 1907.
- Wilkinson, R.J. (1908). An Abridged Malay-English Dictionary (romanized). F.M.S. government Press.
- Vogel, Dr. J.Ph. (1918). "The Yupa, Inscriptions of King Mulavarman, From Koetei (East Borneo)". Bijdragen tot de Taal-, Land- en Volkenkunde / Journal of the Humanities and Social Sciences of Southeast Asia. 74 (1): 167–232. doi:10.1163/22134379-90001650. " Text is licensed by Bijdragen tot de taal-, land- en volkenkunde / Journal of the Humanities and Social Sciences of Southeast Asia under CC BY NC 3.0"
- Nathan, J. E. (1922). The Census of British Malaya: (the Straits Settlements, Federated Malay States and Protected States of Johore, Kedah, Perlis, Kelantan, Trengganu, and Brunei), 1921. Waterlow.
- Great Britain Colonial Office (1936). Colonial Reports - Annual State of Brunei. Report.
- Shamsul Bahrin, Tunku (1967). The Pattern of Indonesian Migration and Settlement in Malaya (PDF). Vol. v (2 ed.). Diliman, Quezon City, Philippines: Asian Studies. Archived (PDF) from the original on 20 March 2026 – via Asian Center, University of the Philippines Diliman.
- Ukur, Fridolin (1971). Tantang-djawab suku Dayak: suatu penjelidikan tentang unsur2 jang menjekitari penolakan dan penerimaan Indjil dikalangan suku-Dajak dalam rangka sedjarah geredja di Kalimantan, 1835-1945 [The Dayak Tribe's Challenge and Responsibility: An Investigation of the Elements Surrounding the Rejection and Acceptance of the Gospel among the Dayak Tribe in the Framework of Church History in Kalimantan, 1835-1945] (in Indonesian). BPK Gunung Mulia.
- Idwar Saleh, M. (1975). "Agrarian Radicalism and movements of native insurrection in South Kalimantan (1858-1865)". Archipel. 9: 135–153. doi:10.3406/arch.1975.1225 – via Persée.
- Clammer, John (1981). "Malay Society in Singapore: A Preliminary Analysis". Southeast Asian Journal of Social Science. 9 (1/2): 19–32. doi:10.1163/156853181X00020. JSTOR 24490837.
- Kawi, Djantera; Ismail, Abdurachman; Ranrung, Willem (1984). Struktur bahasa Maanyan [Maanyan language structure] (in Indonesian). Centre for Language Development and Fostering, Department of Education and Culture, Indonesia.
- Kajian etnografi Sabah: laporan [Sabah ethnographic study: report] (in Malay). National University of Malaysia. 1985.
- Lontaan, J. U. (1985). Menjelajah Kalimantan [Exploring Kalimantan] (in Indonesian). Baru.
- Nawawi, H. Ramli; Ruslan, Tamny; Aziddin, Yustan (1986). Sejarah kota Banjarmasin [History of Banjarmasin City] (in Indonesian). Department of Education and Culture, Directorate of History and Traditional Values, National Historical Inventory and Documentation Project, Indonesia.
- Kipp, Rita Smith (1987). Indonesian Religions in Transition. University of Arizona Press. ISBN 978-0-8165-1020-7.
- Usman, Ahmad Gazali (1989). Urang Banjar dalam sejarah [Banjar people in history] (in Indonesian). Lambung Mangkurat University Press. ISBN 978-979-8128-16-5.
- Leake, David (1989). Brunei: The Modern Southeast-Asian Islamic Sultanate. McFarland. ISBN 978-0-89950-434-6.
- Syarifuddin, Drs.; Kasuma, B.A Attabranie; Hermantedo, Sabrie; Syahrir (1993). MAKANAN : WUJUD, VARIASI DAN FUNGSINYA SERTA CARA PENYAJIANNYA DAERAH KALIMANTAN SELATAN [FOOD: FORM, VARIATIONS AND FUNCTIONS AS WELL AS HOW IT IS SERVED IN SOUTH KALIMANTAN] (PDF) (in Indonesian). Department of Education and Culture, Directorate General of Culture, Directorate of History and Traditional Values, Research Project on the Study and Development of Cultural Values, 1993. Archived (PDF) from the original on 4 April 2026 – via Institutional Repository, Ministry of Primary and Secondary Education, Indonesia.
- Nicholl, Robert (1995). From Buckfast to Borneo: Essays Presented to Father Robert Nicholl on the 85th Anniversary of His Birth, 27 March 1995. University of Hull. ISBN 978-0-85958-836-2.
- Turner, Peter (1995). Indonesia: A Lonely Planet Travel Survival Kit. Lonely Planet Publications. ISBN 978-0-86442-263-7.
- Kisah dari kampung halaman: masyarakat suku, agama resmi, dan pembangunan [Stories from the hometown: tribal society, official religion, and development] (in Indonesian). Interfidei. 1996. ISBN 978-979-8726-05-7.
- Sjarifuddin, Drs.; Abbas; Mardiana; Iskandar (1996). KOLEKSI KESENIAN TRADISIONAL MUSEUM NEGERI PROPKALSEL LAMBUNG MANGKURAT HUBUNGANNYA DENGAN MUATAN LOKAL KURIKULUM 1994 [TRADITIONAL ARTS COLLECTION OF THE STATE MUSEUM OF SOUTH KALIMANTAN PROVINCE LAMBUNG MANGKURAT IN ITS RELATIONSHIP WITH THE LOCAL CONTENT OF THE 1994 CURRICULUM] (PDF) (in Indonesian). Department of Education and Culture, Directorate General of Culture, Directorate of Museums, Museum Development Project Division, South Kalimantan, 1995/1996. Archived (PDF) from the original on 3 April 2026 – via Institutional Repository, Ministry of Primary and Secondary Education, Indonesia.
- Walujo, Kanti W. (2000). Dunia wayang: nilai estetis, sakralitas, dan ajaran hidup [The world of wayang: aesthetic values, sacredness, and life lessons] (in Indonesian). Pustaka Pelajar.
- Hawkins, Mary (2000). "Becoming Banjar [Identity and ethnicity in South Kalimantan, Indonesia]". The Asia Pacific Journal of Anthropology. 1 (1) (Essays in Honour of Paul Alexander ed.): 24–36. doi:10.1080/14442210010001705830 – via Taylor & Francis.
- Aziddin, Yustan (2000). Banjarmasin: Folktales from South Kalimantan (in Indonesian). Grasindo. ISBN 978-979-669-942-1.
- Kartomi, Margaret (2002). "Meaning, Style and Change in Gamalan and Wayang Kulit Banjar Since Their Transplantation from Hindu-Buddhist Java to South Kalimantan". The World of Music. 44 (2) (Body and Ritual in Buddhist Musical Cultures ed.). VWB - Verlag für Wissenschaft und Bildung: 17–55. JSTOR 41699425.
- Mujitat; Sondari, Koko (2002). "ALBUM WAYANG KULIT BANJAR" [BANJAR SHADOW PUPPET ALBUM] (PDF). Cultural Utilitation Project Directorate of Traditions and Belief Deputy for Cultural Preservation and Development Cultural and Tourism Development Agency Jakarta, Ministry of Culture and Tourism, Culture and Tourism Development Board, Indonesia (in Indonesian). p. 9. Archived (PDF) from the original on 24 March 2026 – via Repositori Institusi, Ministry of Primary and Secondary Education, Indonesia. " Text is licensed by Ministry of Primary and Secondary Education, Indonesia under CC BY NC 4.0"
- Adelaar, K. Alexander; Himmelmann, Nikolaus (25 November 2004). The Austronesian Languages of Asia and Madagascar. Routledge. ISBN 978-1-136-75509-5.
- Ideham, M. Suriansyah; Sjarifuddin, H.; Ariffin Anis, M. Zainal; Wajidi (2005). Urang Banjar dan kebudayaannya [Banjar people and their culture] (PDF) (in Indonesian). South Kalimantan Provincial Government. ISBN 978-979-98892-1-8. Archived (PDF) from the original on 3 April 2026.
- Munoz, Paul Michel (2006). Early Kingdoms of the Indonesian Archipelago and the Malay Peninsula. Editions Didier Millet. p. 281. ISBN 981-4155-67-5.
- Kahn, Joel S. (2006). Other Malays: Nationalism and Cosmopolitanism in the Modern Malay World. NUS Press. ISBN 978-9971-69-334-3.
- Obyek wisata Nusantara [Indonesian tourist attractions] (in Indonesian). Fery Agung Corporation in collaboration with the Department of Culture and Tourism of Indonesia. 2006. ISBN 978-979-3824-15-4.
- Oostindie, Geert (1 January 2008). Dutch Colonialism, Migration and Cultural Heritage: Past and Present. BRILL. ISBN 978-90-04-25388-9.
- Tiwary, Shiv Shanker; Kumar, Rajeev (2009). Encyclopaedia of Southeast Asia and Its Tribes. Anmol Publications. ISBN 978-81-261-3837-1.
- Prasetyo, Deni (2009). Mengenal Kerajaan-Kerajaan Nusantara [Getting to Know the Kingdoms of the Nusantara Archipelago] (in Indonesian). Pustaka Widyatama. ISBN 978-979-610-309-6.
- Kleden-Probonegoro, Ninuk (2010). "Mamanda theatre, the play of Banjar culture". Wacana, Journal of the Humanities of Indonesia. 12 (1). Jakarta, Indonesia: 162–180. doi:10.17510/wjhi.v12i1.82. eISSN 2407-6899. " Text is licensed by Wacana, Journal of the Humanities of Indonesia under CC BY NC 4.0"
- Mujiburrahman; Alfisyah; Syadzali, Ahmad (2011). Badingsanak Dayak-Banjar: Identitas Agama dan Ekonomi Etnisitas di Kalimantan Selatan [Badingsanak Dayak-Banjar: Religious Identity and Ethnic Economy in South Kalimantan] (in Indonesian). Religious and Cross-Cultural Studies Program, Graduate School, Gadjah Mada University, CRCS. ISBN 978-602-96257-4-5.
- Walujo, Kanti W. (2011). Wayang sebagai media komunikasi tradisional dalam diseminasi informasi [Wayang as a traditional communication medium in information dissemination] (in Indonesian). Ministry of Communication and Informatics of the Republic of Indonesia, Directorate General of Public Information and Communication.
- The Hidden Beauty of South Borneo. Youth, Sport, Culture, and Tourism Office, South Kalimantan Province. 2011.
- Minahan, James (30 August 2012). Ethnic Groups of South Asia and the Pacific: An Encyclopedia. Bloomsbury Academic. ISBN 978-1-59884-659-1.
- Mohamed, Noriah; Basri, Ghazali (2012). Masyarakat banjar Johor [Johor banjar community] (in Malay). Johor Heritage Foundation. ISBN 978-983-2440-50-5.
- Rafiek, M. (2012). "Pantun Madihin: Kajian Ciri, Struktur Pementasan, Kreativiti Pemadihinan, Pembangunan, dan Pembinaannya di Kalimantan Selatan" [Madihin Poem: Study Of Characteristic, Performance Structure, Creativity of Madihinan, Design And Development in South Kalimantan] (PDF). Malay Language Education Journal – MyLEJ (in Malay). 2 (2): 106–117. ISSN 2180-4842. Archived (PDF) from the original on 2 December 2020 – via UKM Journal Article Repository.
- Maimanah, M.Ag; Norhidayat, MA (2012). "TRADISI BAAYUN MULUD DI BANJARMASIN" [THE BAAYUN MULUD TRADITION IN BANJARMASIN]. Al-Banjari (in Indonesian). 11 (1): 51–76. ISSN 1412-9507. Archived from the original on 5 April 2026 – via UIN Antasari Open Journal System.
- Hiroyuki, Yanagihashi (28 October 2013). The Concept of Territory in Islamic Law and Thought: A Comparative Study. Routledge. ISBN 978-1-136-18453-6.
- Ikbar, Yanuar (2014). Perang fi-sabilillah di Kalimantan, 1859-1863: menguak peranan Sultan Hidayatullah [Fi-sabilillah war in Kalimantan, 1859-1863: revealing the role of Sultan Hidayatullah] (in Indonesian). Department of Youth, Sports, Culture, and Tourism, South Kalimantan Provincial Government. ISBN 978-602-18772-0-3.
- Hall, Kenneth R. (2014). "European Southeast Asia Encounters with Islamic Expansionism, circa 1500-1700: Comparative Case Studies of Banten, Ayutthaya, and Banjarmasin in the Wider Indian Ocean Context". Journal of World History, University of Hawaii Press. 25 (2/3): 229–262. JSTOR 43818481.
- Jamalie, Zulfa (2014). "AKULTURASI DAN KEARIFAN LOKAL DALAM TRADISI BAAYUN MAULID PADA MASYARAKAT BANJAR" [ACCULTURATION AND LOCAL WISDOM IN THE BAAYUN MAULID TRADITION IN THE BANJAR COMMUNITY]. El Harakah, Journal of Islamic Culture (in Indonesian). 16 (2): 234–254. doi:10.18860/el.v16i2.2778. eISSN 2356-1734. Archived from the original on 31 March 2026 – via Universitas Islam Negeri Maulana Malik Ibrahim Malang E-Journal. " Text is licensed by El Harakah, Journal of Islamic Culture under CC BY NC SA 4.0"
- Nur Rahmawati, Neni Puji; Musfeptial; Syarifuddin, R (2014). Makna simbolik dan nilai budaya kuliner "wadai Banjar 41 macam" pada masyarakat Banjar Kalsel [The symbolic meaning and cultural value of the culinary "41 kinds of Banjar wadai" in the Banjar community of South Kalimantan] (PDF) (in Indonesian). Kepel Press. pp. 1–114. ISBN 978-602-1228-94-4. Archived (PDF) from the original on 5 April 2026 – via Institutional Repository, Ministry of Primary and Secondary Education, Indonesia.
- Shapiah (2015). "Nilai-Nilai Pendidikan Islam Dalam Tradisi Kelahiran Pada Adat Banjar" [Islamic Educational Values in the Birth Tradition of Banjar Custom]. Mu'adalah, Jurnal Studi Gender dan Anak (in Indonesian). 3 (1): 67–83. ISSN 2354-6271. Archived from the original on 5 April 2026 – via UIN Antasari Open Journal System.
- Juliani Noor, Hj. Aisjah; Fajriah, Noor (2015). "BASIC GEOMETRY SKILLS AT RUMAH BUBUNGAN TINGGI OF BANJARESE IN SOUTH KALIMANTAN". Mathematics Education Department of Teachers Training and Education Faculty, Lambung Mangkurat University. Banjarmasin, Indonesia: 1–9. Archived from the original on 6 April 2026 – via ResearchGate.
- Othman, Normala (2016). "Sejarah dan Latar Belakang Masyarakat Kedayan" [History and Background of the Kedayan Community] (PDF). Al-Hikmah (in Malay). 8 (2): 3–18. ISSN 1985-6822. Archived from the original (PDF) on 16 May 2018 – via UKM Journal Article Repository.
- Anderiani, Lupi (2016). "Musik Panting di Desa Barikin Kalimantan Selatan: Kemunculan, Keberadaan dan Perubahannya" [Panting Music in Barikin Village, South Kalimantan: Its Emergence, Existence, and Changes]. Resital: Jurnal Seni Pertunjukan (in Indonesian). 17 (3): 140–157. doi:10.24821/resital.v17i3.2229. Archived from the original on 24 March 2026 – via Jurnal Online, Indonesia Institute of the Arts Yogyakarta.
- Emawati, Emawati (2016). "RITUAL BAAYUN ANAK DAN DINAMIKANYA" [CHILD BAAYUN RITUAL AND ITS DYNAMICS]. Al-Murabbi Journal of Educational and Islamic Studies (in Indonesian). 2 (2): 158–179. ISSN 2406-775X – via Institute for Research, Publication and Community Service (LP3M), STIT Islamiyah Karya Pembangunan Paron, Ngawi. " Text is licensed by Al-Murabbi Journal of Educational and Islamic Studies under CC BY SA 4.0"
- Vania Michiani, Meidwinna; Asano, Junichiro (2016). "Influence of inhabitant background on the physical changes of Banjarese houses: A case study in Kuin Utara settlement, Banjarmasin, Indonesia". Frontiers of Architectural Research. 5 (4): 414–424. doi:10.1016/j.foar.2016.09.005 – via ScienceDirect. " Text is licensed by Frontiers of Architectural Research under CC BY NC ND 4.0"
- Indonesian Islamic Culture in Historical Perspectives. Directorate of History, Directorate General of Culture, Ministry of Education and Culture, Indonesia. 2017. ISBN 978-602-1289-40-2.
- Hussin, Nurussobah; Mohd Yunus, Nurul Husna; Suhaila Juharei, Nur; Wan Mohd Saman, Wan Satirah (2017). "Sosiobudaya Masyarakat Banjar di Malaysia" [Socioculture of the Banjar community in Malaysia] (PDF). Jurnal Sejarah Lisan Malaysia (in Malay). 1 (1): 48–61. ISSN 2600-7088. Archived (PDF) from the original on 30 March 2026 – via Universiti Teknologi MARA Institutional Repository.
- Jauhari Ali, Mahmud; Anik Mayani, Luh (2017). Mengenal Rumah Tradisional di Kalimantan [Getting to Know Traditional Houses in Kalimantan] (PDF) (in Indonesian). Agency for Language Development and Cultivation, Ministry of Education and Culture, Indonesia. ISBN 978-602-437-293-4. Archived (PDF) from the original on 10 April 2026.
- Abdullah, Nurul Farhana Low; Pakri, Mohd Rashidi (2017). Dynamism of Local Knowledge Revisiting History and Culture. Penerbit USM. ISBN 978-967-461-202-3.
- Lah, Salasiah Che; Ramakrishna, Rita Abdul Rahman (2019). Research Mosaics of Language Studies in Asia Differences and Diversity (Penerbit USM). Penerbit USM. ISBN 978-967-461-379-2.
- B, Ahmad Barjie; Jumbawuya, Aliansyah (2019). Mozaik sejarah Banjar [Banjar historical mosaic] (in Indonesian). Library and Archives Service, South Kalimantan Province. ISBN 978-602-0785-94-3.
- Abdurrahman, H.; Abduh, Muhammad (2019). "Banjarese: Self-Concept, Identity and River Culture". Khatulistiwa Journal of Islamic Studies, Institute of Research and Community Service (LP2M). 9 (2): 43–64. doi:10.24260/khatulistiwa.v9i2.1480. eISSN 2502-8499. Archived from the original on 22 March 2026 – via Jurnal IAIN Pontianak. " Text is licensed by Khatulistiwa Journal of Islamic Studies under CC BY NC ND 4.0"
- Rafiek, M. (2019). "Madihin of John Tralala and Hendra: A Study of Presentation, Structure, Form, Value, and Function" (PDF). Celt: A Journal of Culture, English Language, Teaching & Literature. 19 (2). Notre Dame, Indiana, United States: 256–186. doi:10.24167/celt.v19i2. ISSN 2502-4914. Archived (PDF) from the original on 23 March 2026 – via The Distant Reader, University of Notre Dame.
- Anwar, Khairil (14 July 2020). Teologi Al Banjari [Al Banjari Theology] (in Indonesian). Airlangga University Press. ISBN 978-602-473-439-8.
- Christian-Muslim Relations. A Bibliographical History Volume 16 North America, South-East Asia, China, Japan, and Australasia (1800-1914). BRILL. 29 June 2020. ISBN 978-90-04-42990-1.
- Frassetya Astiyanto, Windy (2020). DESAKRALISASI TARI BAKSA KEMBANG (Pembuatan Film Dokumenter Tentang Berkurangnya Kesakralan Tari Baksa Kembang Banjarmasin Provinsi Kalimantan Selatan) [DESACRALISATION OF THE BAKSA KEMBANG DANCE (Making a Documentary Film About the Declining Sanctity of the Baksa Kembang Dance in Banjarmasin, South Kalimantan Province)] (PDF). Communication Studies Program, Faculty of Psychology and Social and Cultural Sciences (Thesis) (in Indonesian). p. 1–47 – via Islamic University of Indonesia DSpace Repository.
- Muttaqin, Zainal (2020). "HISTORISITAS, SETTING SOSIAL, POLITIK, DAN KARAKTER HUKUM ISLAM DI KALIMANTAN SELATAN" [HISTORICITY, SOCIAL SETTING, POLITICS, AND CHARACTER OF ISLAMIC LAW IN SOUTH KALIMANTAN]. Al-Banjari (in Indonesian). 19 (2): 287–303. ISSN 2527-6778. Archived from the original on 1 April 2021 – via UIN Antasari Open Journal System.
- Muthoifin; Putri, Pristila (2021). "Social Level Parameters of Banjar Society in the Tradition of Jujuran Islamic Law Perspective" (PDF). Proceedings of the International Conference on Engineering, Technology and Social Science (ICONETOS 2020). Advances in Social Science, Education and Humanities Research. Vol. 529 (Proceedings of the International Conference on Engineering, Technology and Social Science (ICONETOS 2020) ed.). pp. 87–90. doi:10.2991/assehr.k.210421.014. ISBN 978-94-6239-368-4. ISSN 2352-5398. Archived (PDF) from the original on 14 April 2026 – via Atlantis Press. " Text is licensed by Advances in Social Science, Education and Humanities Research under CC BY NC 4.0"
- Hendra Saputra, Imam; Krismanti, Ninuk; Lestary, Agustina (2021). "Banjar Language Shifting in Ecolinguistics Perspective". Jurnal Ilmiah Lingua Idea. 12 (1): 207–224. doi:10.20884/1.jli.2021.12.2.4770. eISSN 2580-1066. Archived from the original on 18 September 2023 – via Jurnal Online Soedirman.
- Wilson, Wilson (2021). "Relasi Islam-Dayak di Kota Palangka Raya Kalimantan Tengah" [Islam-Dayak relations in the city of Palangka Raya, Central Kalimantan]. Jurnal Pendidikan Tambusai (in Indonesian). 5 (3): 11105–11122. ISSN 2614-3097. " Text is licensed by Jurnal Pendidikan Tambusai under CC BY 4.0"
- Gumelar, Faujian Esa; Darmawan, Wawan; Winarti, Murdiyah; Yulianti, Iing (2021). "The Value of Local Wisdom in Mamanda Traditional Arts in South Kalimantan" (PDF). Proceeding the 6th International Seminar on Social Studies and History Education (ISSHE) (Promoting Local Wisdom and Globalism towards Sustainable Development in the Pandemic and Post Pandemic Era ed.). Bandung, Indonesia: 73–80. Archived (PDF) from the original on 24 March 2026 – via Indonesia University of Education.
- Hadi Imawan, Dzulkifli (2021). "The Contribution of Shaykh Muhammad Arsyad Al-Banjari in Spreading Islam in Nusantara". Santri: Journal of Pesantren and Fiqh Sosial. 2 (2): 133–144. doi:10.35878/santri.v2i2.328. eISSN 2722-8223. Archived from the original on 27 March 2026. " Text is licensed by Santri: Journal of Pesantren and Fiqh Sosial under CC BY SA 4.0"
- Hermawan, Dedy (2021). KOLABORASI PERPUSTAKAAN DAN SENIMAN LOKAL DALAM DISEMINASI INFORMASI SENI MUSIK TRADISIONAL KALIMANTAN SELATAN (Studi Pada Program Badarau Musik Etnik Di Dinas Perpustakaan Dan Kearsipan Kabupaten Tanah Laut) [COLLABORATION BETWEEN LIBRARIES AND LOCAL ARTISTS IN DISSEMINATION OF INFORMATION ON TRADITIONAL MUSIC ART IN SOUTH KALIMANTAN (A Study of the Badarau Ethnic Music Program at the Library and Archives Service of Tanah Laut Regency)] (PDF). Master of Arts (M.A.) Degree in the Interdisciplinary Islamic Studies Study Program, Concentration in Library and Information Science (Thesis) (in Indonesian). Yogyakarta, Indonesia. p. 1–119. Archived (PDF) from the original on 3 April 2026 – via Sunan Kalijaga State Islamic University Institutional Repository.
- Yusoff, Yusmawati; Abdul Wahab, Mohd Khaidir (2021). "Kata Sapaan dan Rujukan dalam Kalangan Masyarakat Banjar Terpilih di Daerah Kerian Perak" [Greetings and References Among Selected Banjar Communities in the Kerian District of Perak]. International Journal of Language Education and Applied Linguistics (in Malay). 11 (2): 6–22. doi:10.15282/ijleal.v11i2.6536. eISSN 2289-9294. Archived from the original on 30 March 2026 – via Universiti Malaysia Pahang Al-Sultan Abdullah Journals. " Text is licensed by International Journal of Language Education and Applied Linguistics under CC BY 4.0"
- Rachmawati, Meida; Nugroho, Fibry Jati; Supriyanto, Eko Eddya; Saksono, Herie; Cahyo, Aji Nur; Natalia, Frisca; Silviana, Shinta; Windy, Elpino (5 May 2021). ICLSSEE 2021: Proceedings of the 1st International Conference on Law, Social Science, Economics, and Education, ICLSSEE 2021, March 6th 2021, Jakarta, Indonesia. European Alliance for Innovation. ISBN 978-1-63190-301-4.
- Aupa, Nur Aziza; Sarjiwo; Raharja, Budi (2021). METODE PEMBELAJARAN TARI JAPIN SIGAM DI SANGGAR SENI PUSAKA SAIJAAN KABUPATEN KOTABARU KALIMANTAN SELATAN [JAPIN SIGAM DANCE LEARNING METHOD AT THE HERITAGE SAIJAAN ARTS STUDIO, KOTABARU REGENCY, SOUTH KALIMANTAN] (PDF). Bachelor of Performing Arts Education Study Program, Department of Performing Arts Education, Faculty of Performing Arts (Thesis) (in Indonesian). p. 1–9. Archived (PDF) from the original on 12 June 2024 – via Indonesia Institute of the Arts Yogyakarta Institutional Repository.
- Huzairin, M D; Oktaviana, A (2021). "Typology of foundation in Banjar traditional architecture: The solution for house foundation in swamp land in Banjarmasin". IOP Conference Series: Earth and Environmental Science. 780 (012024) (3rd International Seminar on Livable Space ed.): 1–9. doi:10.1088/1755-1315/780/1/012024. Archived from the original on 11 April 2026 – via IOP Publishing. " Text is licensed by IOP Publishing under CC BY 3.0"
- Faidah, Mutimmatul; Maulidiyah, Rizkiani; Rusmanto, Hery (2021). "Islamic Values in Banjar Bridal Makeup: Developing Local Wisdom as Character Education" (PDF). Humanus, Jurnal Ilmiah Ilmu-ilmu Humaniora. 20 (1). West Sumatra, Indonesia: 84–97. doi:10.24036/humanus.v20i1.111417. Archived (PDF) from the original on 13 April 2026 – via Centre for Humanities Studies Faculty of Languages and Arts, State University of Padang/Neliti. " Text is licensed by Humanus, Jurnal Ilmiah Ilmu-ilmu Humaniora under CC BY NC 4.0"
- Lasambouw, Carolina; Sutjiredjeki, Ediana; Nuryati, Neneng (2022). "Excellence Ethnic Characters in Strengthening the Country National Values Identity: An Experience of Indonesia" (PDF). Advances in Social Science, Education and Humanities Research. 636 (Annual Civic Education Conference (ACEC 2021) ed.): 641–647. Archived from the original (PDF) on 20 March 2026 – via Atlantis Press. " Text is licensed by Advances in Social Science, Education and Humanities Research under CC BY NC 4.0"
- Rahmawati, Siti; Prihartanti, Nanik; Purwandari, Eny (2022). "The Philosophical Values of the Bapukung Tradition of the People of South Kalimantan". Proceedings of the International Conference on Communication, Policy and Social Science (InCCluSi 2022). Advances in Social Science, Education and Humanities Research. Vol. 682. doi:10.2991/978-2-494069-07-7_34. ISBN 978-2-494069-07-7. ISSN 2352-5398 – via Atlantis Press. " Text is licensed by Advances in Social Science, Education and Humanities Research under CC BY NC 4.0"
- Rahimah, Hidayati; Hakim, Luchman; Azrianingsih, Rodiyati (2022). "Community Perspective on the Banjarese Cuisine and the Strategy for Culinary Tourism Development in Kuin Village, Banjarmasin". Journal of Indonesian Tourism and Development Studies. 10 (1): 49–57. doi:10.21776/ub.jitode.2022.010.01.07. eISSN 2338-1647. Archived from the original on 4 April 2026. " Text is licensed by Journal of Indonesian Tourism and Development Studies under CC BY SA 4.0"
- Braginsky, V. I. (20 June 2022). The Heritage of Traditional Malay Literature: A Historical Survey of Genres, Writings and Literary Views. BRILL. ISBN 978-90-04-48987-5.
- Deddy Huzairin, Muhammad; Nadya Andini, Dila (2022). "Wood Structure System in Traditional Banjar Houses in Indonesia". Journal of Architectural Research and Education. 4 (2): 141–152. doi:10.17509/jare.v4i2.51360. Archived from the original on 7 April 2026 – via Indonesia University of Education Journal. " Text is licensed by Journal of Architectural Research and Education under CC BY NC SA 4.0"
- Kamariah; Kisyani; Mintowati (2022). "Banjar Archaic Vocabulary: An Anthropological Linguistic Studies". Tradition and Modernity of Humanity. 2 (3). Medan, Indonesia: 25–33. doi:10.32734/tmh.v2i3.10147. eISSN 2807-3118. Archived from the original on 19 April 2026 – via University of North Sumatra. " Text is licensed by Tradition and Modernity of Humanity under CC BY SA 4.0"
- Zakia Sani, Muhammad Budi; Wadiyo, Wadiyo; Sayuti, Suminto A.; Syakir, Syakir (2025). "Pengekalan dan Peralihan Bahasa Banjar di Lokasi Terpilih di Mukim Bagan Serai, Perak". Jurnal Antarabangsa Alam Dan Tamadun Melayu (in Malay). 9 (1) (ISET ed.). Semarang, Indonesia: 524–527. doi:10.17576/jatma-2025-1301-04. ISSN 2964-4291. Archived from the original on 23 March 2026 – via Proceeding State University of Semarang.
- Vee, Katrin (13 September 2024). Encyclopedia of National Heroes: Kalimantan. Penerbit Andi.
- Harpriyanti, Haswinda; Fahmi Mubaraq, Yasyir; Lestary, Agustina (2023). "The Role of Mamanda Traditional Theatre in Building the Character of the Youth Generation in South Kalimantan". International Proceeding on Religion, Culture, Law, Education, and Hindu Studies. 1: 138–153. doi:10.47233/jpst.v5i1.4249. ISSN 2985-7821. Archived from the original on 24 March 2026 – via IAHN-TP Palangka Raya. " Text is licensed by International Proceeding On Religion, Culture, Law, Education, and Hindu Studies under CC BY NC SA 4.0"
- Yayuk, Rissari; Ris Riana, Derri; Jahdiah (2023). "Localggggggggggggggggggggggggggggggggggggggggggggggggggggggggggggggggggg Gastronomic Identification in Traditional Lontong Banjar Food in South Kalimantan" (PDF). Proceedings of the Critical Island Studies 2023 Conference (CISC 2023). Advances in Social Science, Education and Humanities Research. Vol. 818 (Proceedings of the Critical Island Studies 2023 Conference (CISC 2023) ed.). pp. 74–92. doi:10.2991/978-2-38476-186-9_9. ISBN 978-2-38476-186-9. ISSN 2352-5398. Archived (PDF) from the original on 5 April 2026 – via Atlantis Press. " Text is licensed by Advances in Social Science, Education and Humanities Research under CC BY NC 4.0"
- Anggraini, Vera; Segita, Ketrin; Aulia, Rika; Novita; Hadibowo Sangalang, Ronald (2023). "The Batasmiah Tradition in the Banjar Tribe Society of South Kalimantan". Journal of Education Technology Information Social Sciences and Health. 2 (2): 972–979. doi:10.57235/jetish.v2i2.921. eISSN 2964-2507. Archived from the original on 5 April 2026. " Text is licensed by Journal of Education Technology Information Social Sciences and Health under CC BY NC 4.0"
- Arum Pertiwi, Aula Sekar; Murti Nugroho, Agung (2023). "Lanting House Preservation Based on River Culture In Sasirangan Village, Banjarmasin" (PDF). Civil and Environmental Science Journal (CIVENSE). 6 (1). Malang, East Java, Indonesia: 65–70. doi:10.21776/ub.civense.2023.00601.8. eISSN 2620-6218. Archived from the original on 20 March 2026 – via Brawijaya University. " Text is licensed by Civil and Environmental Science Journal (CIVENSE) under CC BY NC 4.0"
- Fatma, Atol; Umairoh, Nazwa; Aulia Putri, Nur (2024). "Melodi Musik Panting Melayu Banjar: Eksplorasi Keunikan dan Identitas dalam Seni Musik Tradisional Masyarakat Banjar" [Banjar Malay Panting Music Melody: Exploring the Uniqueness and Identity of the Traditional Musical Art of the Banjar Community]. Jurnal Agama, Sosial, Dan Budaya (in Indonesian). 3 (3): 266–271. eISSN 2963-7139. Archived from the original on 24 March 2026 – via CV. Maryam Sejahtera.
- Valentina Kanty, Juwita; Pratiwi Yahya, Arini Putri; Firda Syahtari, Adinda (2024). "Tari Radap Rahayu: Eksplorasi Keindahan dan Makna dalam Gerakan Tradisional" [Radap Rahayu Dance: Exploring Beauty and Meaning in Traditional Movements]. Jurnal Agama, Sosial, Dan Budaya (in Indonesian). 3 (3): 65–77. eISSN 2963-7139. Archived from the original on 2 April 2026 – via CV. Maryam Sejahtera.
- Mangenda, Yoris (18 November 2024). Dayak Architectural Heritage: The Diversity of Architecture and Historical Traces. Realrich Architecture Workshop. ISBN 978-623-89171-1-2.
- Yanuar Nugraheni, Edlin; Dyah Artaria, Myrtati; Sutinah; Lukens-Bull, Ronald (2024). "The Social Construction of the Banjar Ethnic Society Toward the Radap Rahayu Dance". Jurnal Ilmiah Peuradeun, the Indonesian Journal of Social Sciences. 12 (1): 49–70. doi:10.26811/peuradeun.v12i1.1029. eISSN 2443-2067. Archived from the original on 31 March 2026. " Text is licensed by Jurnal Ilmiah Peuradeun, The Indonesian Journal of Social Sciences under CC BY SA 4.0"
- Zaki, Muhammad; Ratnaningsih, Nani; Marwanti (2023). "KETUPAT KANDANGAN: A SYMBOL OF ISLAMIC VALUES IN BANJAR CUISINE AND ITS IMPLICATIONS FOR CULTURAL IDENTITY AND THE LOCAL ECONOMY". Al-Banjari : Jurnal Ilmiah Ilmu-Ilmu Keislaman. 23 (2): 209–233. doi:10.18592/al-banjari.v22i1.7417. eISSN 2527-6778. Archived from the original on 4 April 2026 – via UIN Antasari Open Journal System. " Text is licensed by Al-Banjari : Jurnal Ilmiah Ilmu-Ilmu Keislaman under CC BY SA 4.0"
- Asriani, Febrianti; Salzabila Almas, Maitsa (2024). "SEJARAH RELIGIUSITAS MASYARAKAT SUKU BANJAR : TRADISI LOKAL BATASMIAH DAN IMPLIKASINYA TERHADAP KEAGAMAAN" [THE HISTORY OF THE RELIGIOSITY OF THE BANJAR TRIBE: LOCAL TRADITIONS OF BATASMIA AND THEIR IMPLICATIONS FOR RELIGIOUSNESS]. Al-Furqan: Jurnal Agama, Sosial, Dan Budaya (in Indonesian). 3 (6): 2516–2523. eISSN 2830-7755. Archived from the original on 5 April 2026 – via Yayasan Maslahatul Ummah Illah Jannah. " Text is licensed by Al-Furqan: Jurnal Agama, Sosial, dan Budaya under CC BY 4.0"
- Amelia, Syifa; Yuningsih, Siska; Jayanti, Meliya; Yanto, A Nuri; Fachriby, M Ridwan; Hafiz, R Rahman (2024). "Eksplorasi Rumah Adat Tradisional Bubungan Tinggi Sebagai Ikon Pariwisata Kalimantan Selatan" [Exploring the Traditional Bubungan Tinggi House as a Tourism Icon of South Kalimantan]. Prosiding Seminar Nasional LPPM UMJ (in Indonesian) (Seminar Nasional LPPM UMJ 2024 ed.): 1–9. eISSN 2714-6286. Archived from the original on 7 April 2026 – via Journal Online Muhammadiyah University of Jakarta.
- Wirawan Dharmatanna, Stephanus; Shanggrama Wijaya, Elvina; Cahyadi Wijaya, Budi (2024). "Passive Cooling Design Opportunities: Lessons Learned from Traditional Banjar Houses" (PDF). International Symposium and Workshop on Sustainable Buildings, Cities, and Communities (SBCC). Surabaya, Indonesia: 1–8. Archived (PDF) from the original on 10 April 2026 – via Petra Christian University.
- Benítez-Burraco, Antonio; Moran, Steven (18 March 2024). The Adaptive Value of Languages: Non-linguistic Causes of Language Diversity, volume II. Frontiers Media SA. ISBN 978-2-8325-4646-8.
- Kamalia, Nor; Aryani, Rida; Hafizah, Siti; Patimah, Siti; Rafi'ah, Siti; Atiyah; Efendy, Noor (2024). "Tradisi Perkawinan Adat Suku Banjar" [Banjar Tribe's Traditional Wedding Traditions]. Indonesian Journal of Islamic Jurisprudence, Economic and Legal Theory (in Indonesian). 2 (3): 1654–1670. doi:10.62976/ijijel.v2i3.703. eISSN 3031-0458. Archived from the original on 14 April 2026. " Text is licensed by Indonesian Journal of Islamic Jurisprudence, Economic and Legal Theory under CC BY NC SA 4.0"
- Abdul Wahab, Mohd Khaidir; Shin, Chong; Harun, Karim (2025). "Pengekalan dan Peralihan Bahasa Banjar di Lokasi Terpilih di Mukim Bagan Serai, Perak" [The Retention and Transition of the Banjar Language in Selected Locations in Mukim Bagan Serai, Perak] (PDF). International Journal of the Malay World and Civilisation (in Malay). 13 (1): 38–50. doi:10.17576/jatma-2025-1301-04 – via UKM Journal Article Repository.
- Dwi Sulistiyani, Endah; Mahrita; Yuliana, S. (2025). "The Distinctive Banjar Art of Balamut". ICCCM Journal of Social Sciences and Humanities (ICCCM JSSH). 4 (Special Issue): 181–185. doi:10.53797/icccmjssh.v4.sp.30.2025. eISSN 2811-4469. Archived from the original on 23 March 2026. " Text is licensed by ICCCM Journal of Social Sciences and Humanities (ICCCM JSSH) under CC BY NC SA 4.0"
- Maulidia, Zalda; Zakiah, Kiki; Sabila, Rezandi; Fajriyanti, Desi; Habilah, Muhammad; Bahar, Syairul; Alfarauq, Farkhan Abdurochim (2025). "MAKNA SOSIAL DAN NILAI BUDAYA DALAM ALAT MUSIK PANTING MASYARAKAT BANJAR" [SOCIAL MEANING AND CULTURAL VALUES IN THE PANTING MUSICAL INSTRUMENT OF THE BANJAR SOCIETY]. Al-Furqan: Jurnal Agama, Sosial, Dan Budaya (in Indonesian). 4 (6): 2516–2523. eISSN 2830-7844. Archived from the original on 24 March 2026 – via Yayasan Maslahatul Ummah Illah Jannah. " Text is licensed by Al-Furqan: Jurnal Agama, Sosial, dan Budaya under CC BY 4.0"
- Muhamad Shadiq, Gusti; Harisuddin, Ahmad (2025). "KEBUDAYAAN BANJAR, DAYAK, MELAYU DAN INTERELASI ISLAM TERHADAP BUDAYA DI KALIMANTAN SELATAN" [BANJAR, DAYAK, MALAY CULTURE AND THE INTERRELATION OF ISLAM WITH CULTURE IN SOUTH KALIMANTAN]. Indonesian Journal of Islamic Jurisprudence, Economic and Legal Theory (in Indonesian). 3 (3): 2756–2786. eISSN 3031-0458. Archived from the original on 30 March 2026. " Text is licensed by Indonesian Journal of Islamic Jurisprudence, Economic and Legal Theory under CC BY NC SA 4.0"
- Adhadi Akbar, Muhammad (2025). "Kepercayaan Terhadap Kapuhunan Di Masyarakat Banjar" [Belief in the Kapuhunan in Banjar Society]. Indonesian Journal of Islamic Jurisprudence, Economic and Legal Theory (in Indonesian). 3 (1): 463–470. doi:10.62976/ijijel.v3i1.950. eISSN 3031-0458. Archived from the original on 30 March 2026. " Text is licensed by Indonesian Journal of Islamic Jurisprudence, Economic and Legal Theory under CC BY NC SA 4.0"
- Subhan Sujudinur, Muhammad Rahman (2025). "Tradisi Badudus Dan Bamandi-Mandi Pada Masyarakat Banjar Hulu Sungai" [The Badudus and Bamandi-Mandi Traditions of the Banjar Community of the Hulu Sungai]. Indonesian Journal of Islamic Jurisprudence, Economic and Legal Theory (in Indonesian). 3 (1): 202–209. doi:10.62976/ijijel.v3i1.910. eISSN 3031-0458. Archived from the original on 5 April 2026. " Text is licensed by Indonesian Journal of Islamic Jurisprudence, Economic and Legal Theory under CC BY NC SA 4.0"
- Zainol, Noorliza; Razali, Mohamad Azli; Syed Hamzah, Syarifah Atifah; Abdullah, Siti Khadijah (2025). "Traditional Kalakatar dessert in Perak" (PDF). Newsletter Bulletin. 1: 1–8. eISSN 2231-7422. Archived (PDF) from the original on 11 April 2026 – via Universiti Teknologi MARA Repository.
- Hidayatur Rafiqoh, Putri Ayu (2025). "ETHNOGRAPHY OF COMMUNICATION: THE WAY OF SPEAKING IN BANJAR COMMUNITY OF SOUTH KALIMANTAN". Common: Jurnal Program Studi Ilmu Komunikasi FISIP UNIKOM. 9 (1): 1–13. doi:10.34010/5z0szw26. eISSN 2580-6386. Archived from the original on 19 April 2026.
- Sholihat, Desma; Yasnel (2026). "Seni Pertunjukan Melayu di Provinsi Riau: Kajian Literatur tentang Jenis dan Fungsinya" [Malay Performing Arts in Riau Province: A Literature Review of Their Types and Functions]. Al-Amin: Journal of Educational Sciences and Social Humanities (in Indonesian). 3 (2): 215–232. eISSN 3024-8965. Archived (PDF) from the original on 24 March 2026 – via ResearchGate.
- Mahfuzah, Ghina Sofia; Jamalie, Zulfa; Wibowo, Fasih (2026). "Budaya Mamanda, Konsep, Filosofi, Identitas Dan Nilai-Nilai Pendidikan Islam" [Mamanda Culture, Concepts, Philosophy, Identity and Values of Islamic Education]. Jurnal Pendidikan, Sains Dan Teknologi (in Indonesian). 5 (1): 53–60. doi:10.47233/jpst.v5i1.4249. eISSN 2963-5373 – via Jurnal Minartis. " Text is licensed by Jurnal Pendidikan, Sains dan Teknologi under CC BY 4.0"
- Hein, Olivier (2026). Borneo: The History of an Enigma. Oxford University Press. ISBN 978-1-80526-423-1.
- Widjono, Roedy Haryo. Sejarah Gereja Katolik di Kutai Barat [History of the Catholic Church in West Kutai] (in Indonesian). Nomaden Institute. ISBN 978-602-51007-2-7.
- H. M. Tahir, S. Ag. Sejarah Dakwah Islam di Kalimantan (Studi Pendekatan dan Jaringan) [History of Islamic Preaching in Kalimantan (A Study of Approaches and Networks)] (in Indonesian). Bening Media Publishing. ISBN 978-623-8006-41-0.
