= Tahmidullah II of Banjar =

15th Sultan of Banjar (1761–1801)

Tahmidulah II تحميد الله ٢
- Susuhunan; Panembahan Ratu; Prince Nata Mangkubhumi
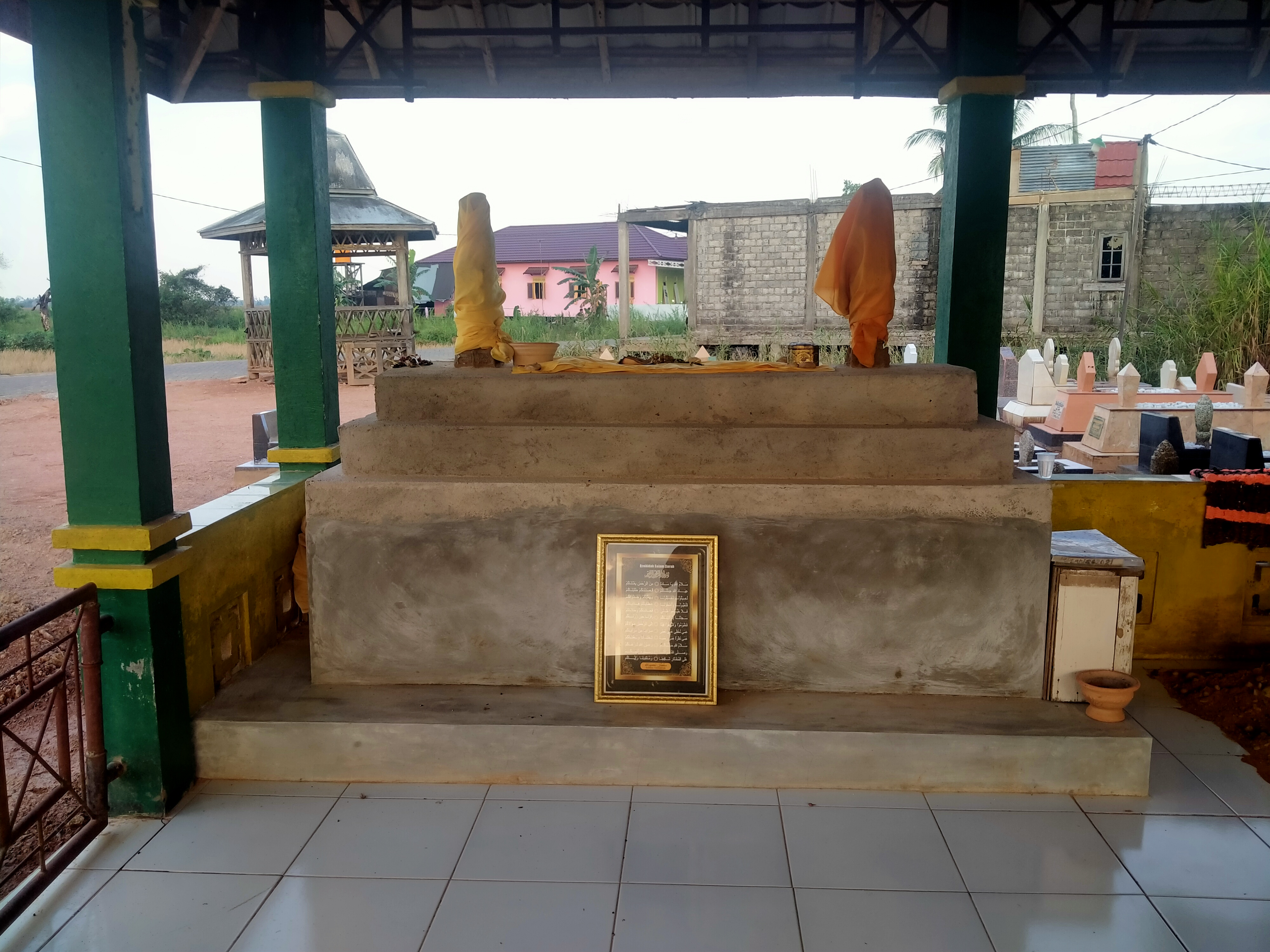
- The tomb of Tahmidullah II in Martapura, Banjar Regency.

Sultan of Banjar
- Reign: 16 January 1761 – 19 April 1801
- Predecessor: Muhammad
- Successor: Sulaiman

Mangkubhumi of Banjar
- Reign: 3 August 1759 – 16 January 1761
- Predecessor: Prince Nullah
- Successor: Ratu Anom Kasuma Yuda
- Born: Prince Wira Nata Dilaga; 1727; Martapura, Sultanate of Banjar
- Died: 19 April 1801 (aged 73–74) see #Death
- Spouses: The Grand Empress Dowager Lawiyah; Syarifah Queen Raudah Maimunah of Prambanan; Queen Umi Suryani; Syarifah Queen Aminah
- Issue: List: Prince Sulaiman; Prince Ismail Mangku Dilaga; Princess Siti Air Mas; Ratu Maimunah; Princess Zaleha; Prince Nata Kesuma; Princess Kanifah; Prince Muhammad di Margasari; Prince Tata Negara; Prince Daud; Princess Ishaq; Princess Salamah; Princess Mahmud; Princess Shafiyah; Princess Tapa Ratu Bulan; Princess Siti Nur Sepuh Panjang; Princess Hanimah; Princess Qasim Mardiah; Princess Aminah
Regnal name
- كبوه دولي يڠ مها مليا سري سلطان تحميد الله ڤانمبهان قاهر الدين حلليل الله أكم الدين سعيد الله نات عالم دلاڬ; Kebawah Duli Yang Maha Mulia Seri Sultan Tahmidullah Panembahan Kaharuddin Halilullah Akamuddin Saidullah Nata Alam Dilaga (see #Titles)
Posthumous name
- ڤانمبهان باتو; Panembahan Batu سوسوهونن نات عالم; Susuhunan Nata Alam
- House: House of Tutus Anum
- Father: Sultan Tamjidillah I
- Mother: Ratu Mas
- Religion: Sunni Islam

Tahmidullah II, (1727 – 19 April 1801) also known as Tamjidillah III, (Note: Dutch sources sometimes refer to Tahmidullah II as "Tamjidillah III". This is because his predecessor, Sultan Muhammad is sometimes considered "Tamjidillah II", as he succeeded Sultan Tamjidillah I. However, Muhammad and Tahmidullah II never used the title Tamjidillah. Eventually, 90 years after them, Gusti Wayuri became the first sultan to be titled "Tamjidillah II".) Sulaiman Saidullah I, and Sunan Nata Alam was the Sultan of Banjar who ruled from 1761 to 1801, succeeding his cousin, Muhammad of Banjar. His reign succeeded in maintaining the sovereignty and absolute influence of the sultan, which led to his recognition as one of the best Banjar Sultans.

At first, he was only appointed as Sultan while waiting for Sultan Muhammad's young sons to reach a suitable age. However, his ambition for the throne and the murder of Sultan Muhammad's sons caused him to be confronted with a rebellion from Prince Amir, Sultan Muhammad's third son who claimed the throne and intended to take revenge. Despite not receiving support from the people due to his cruelty, Prince Amir was supported by the alliance of the Bugis and Paser, which forced Tahmidullah II to ask for help from the Dutch East Indies to crush Prince Amir's rebellion.

After Prince Amir's rebellion was put down with a little help from the Dutch, the Dutch demanded that the Sultan make Banjar a protectorate of the Dutch East India Company (VOC). In return, the Sultan handed over a number of territories to the Dutch as a favor for their assistance during Prince Amir's rebellion, an act that was fundamentally unpopular with the Sultan himself. Tahmidullah II, a distinguished diplomat, made an agreement with the Dutch that the Banjar region would remain intact and the ruler of the sultanate would remain in his line. This ended the succession dispute between the descendants of Sultan Hamidullah and Tamjidillah I. However, due to his dislike of the Dutch, Tahmidullah II hired pirates and river bandits, and reduced pepper production to slowly disrupt VOC trade and eventually forced the VOC to abandon Banjar in 1797.

The success of Tahmidullah II's ambition to rule the throne, by ensuring that the ruler of the sultanate was in his line, and his success in expelling the Dutch who had dominated Banjar's economic policies for years, made him recognized as one of the best Sultans of Banjar. Even though he was not a sultan who led the golden age, Tahmidullah II's diplomatic achievements are believed to be one of the achievements that almost no other kingdoms in the Nusantara archipelago could achieve at that time.

== Mangkubhumi ==
Initially, he was appointed as mangkubumi by Sultan Muhammad of Banjar from 1759 until the Sultan's death in 1761, with the title "Pangeran Nata Mangkubumi". Since the death of Sultan Muhammad of Banjar in 1761, he became the Guardian of the Sultan's children with the title "Panembahan Kaharuddin Halilullah".

During his reign in the month of Ramadhan 1186 H corresponding to 1772 AD, the Banjar scholar Sheikh Muhammad Arsyad al-Banjari arrived after 30 years of studying in Mecca.

== Reign (1761–1801) ==
=== Accession ===
After the death of Sultan Muhammad Aminullah on January 16, 1761, Prince Nata became the King's Guardian. After several years, he then appointed himself as Regent and Guardian of Prince Abdullah, Crown Prince of Sultan Muhammad. Prince Nata only crowned himself as Sultan in 1201 AH or 1785 CE, but before that he already had absolute influence.

Prince Nata Dilaga used the title Akamuddin Saidullah for the first time in October 1762, previously he had used the title Panembahan Kaharuddin Halilullah since 1761.

In 1767, Tahmidullah II initiated the construction of the Bumi Kencana Palace in Martapura. However, this palace was later destroyed shortly after the Banjarmasin War ended.

==== Titles ====
According to Anggraini Antemas, Prince Nata or Sunan Nata Alam had the title Sultan Tahmidillah II, this is an officially recognized title. However, according to Helius Sjamsuddin, Prince Nata had the title "Tamjidillah II", or according to other sources, especially Dutch sources, called "Tamjidillah III".

The other titles used by Tahmidullah II are as follows:

1. Panembahan Kaharuddin Halilullah (since 1761)
2. Akamuddin Saidullah (since October (1762 until 1772)
3. Prince Abd Allah
4. Amir al-Mu'minin Abdullah
5. Susuhunan Nata Alam (since 1772)
6. Sunan Nata Alam
7. Prince Wira Nata
8. Prince Nata/Pangeran Nata Dilaga
9. Nata Nagara (Note: Title used when aged 20 years.)
10. Panembahan Batuah.
11. Panembahan Ratu.
12. Panembahan Batu (since 1798, posthumous name)
13. Sultan Batu
14. Panembahan Nata
15. Prince Tahmidillah (since 1785, official title)
16. Sulaiman (1792)
17. Sulaiman Saidullah I (1787–1797)
18. Tuan Sunan Sulaiman Saidullah/Sultan Soliman Shahid Alla

=== Appointment of heir ===
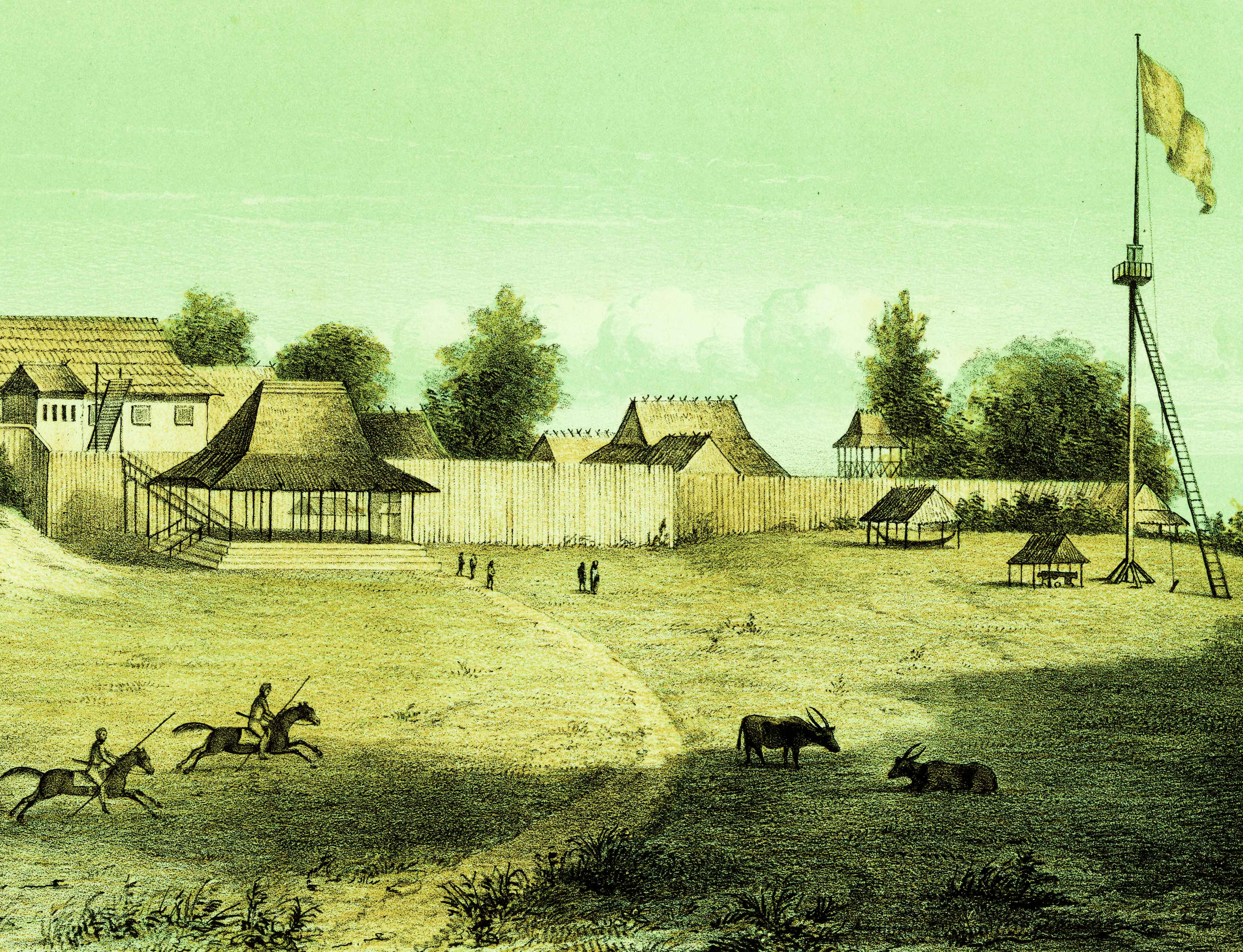
Lithograph of the Bumi Selamat Palace complex (previously called Bumi Kencana) in Martapura which was completed in 1766.

In 1767, Sultan Tahmidulah II appointed his 6-year-old son born in 1761 which was the year of Sultan Muhammad's death, January 16, 1761. Prince Sulaiman with the title Prince Ratu Sulaiman as his successor. Prince Sulaiman who was considered the heir to Queen Lawiyah, the daughter of Sultan Muhammad of Banjar. So, or Tahmidullah II is the Son-in-law of Sultan Muhammad of Banjar. This appointment was carried out to ensure that the successor to the throne of the Banjar Sultanate remains in his direct line of descent. Sultan Tahmidulah II then gave his eldest son the title "Sultan Sulaiman Saidullah II" and he himself then had the title sunan which he considered a higher title, thus becoming "Sunan Sulaiman Saidullah I"

Fifteen years later, in 1782, Sultan Tahmidilah II again elevated his grandson who was born in 1782 with the title "Pangeran Ratu Adam al-Watsiq Billah". This title was given to Prince Adam as the heir or Crown Prince of Banjar since 1782. This appointment process, according to Tahmidullah II, shows the importance of maintaining the continuity and stability of the dynasty in the Banjar Sultanate, by ensuring that the successor to the throne has been prepared early on.

=== Prince Amir's Rebellion ===
==== Background ====
In 1759, news of the arrival of Prince Muhammad who would attack Martapura shocked the palace family, but Sultan Tamjidillah I remained calm over the critical situation. Based on the consideration that there would be no bloodshed between the families themselves, especially since Prince Muhammad was his own nephew and son-in-law, Tamjidillah I handed over the throne of the Banjarmasin Sultanate, so that Prince Muhammad had power over the Banjarmasin Sultanate. Outwardly, Tamjidillah I was happy to hand over the throne to his nephew, Prince Muhammad, but secretly, Tamjidillah I was not happy about the throne being transferred from his hands, especially since most of the nobles supported him as Sultan. This is what caused Prince Tamjidillah to make a cunning strategy, to return the throne to his hands. When Tamjidillah I handed over the throne to Prince Muhammad, in front of the nobles he said: "Let the throne be seized by Ratu Anom (Prince Muhammad), anyway he will die soon anyway".

Some time later, Sultan Muhammad suffered from continuous illness and in 1761 he died leaving behind a young crown prince, it is suspected that the Sultan died of poisoning.

Tamjidillah I's strategy was successful, because when Sultan Muhammad died, he left the Crown Prince still a child, because of that Mangkubumi was back in his hands as the guardian of the Sultan who was not yet an adult, and he appointed his son Prince Nata Alam as the Guardian of the Sultan. The old story that Prince Muhammad experienced after his father, Sultan Kuning died, was repeated after Sultan Muhammad died. The Sultan's Guardian Nata Alam tried to keep the throne and the heir was in his line. Nata Alam began to plan a strategy to carry out his ambition. First he tried to gain the support of the nobility, and it turned out that support was easily obtained. Then he appointed his son as his successor with the title Sultan Sulaiman Saidullah who was only 6 years old at that time (1767). This action was the realization of his strategy to maintain the throne of his lineage and gain support from the nobility which he easily obtained.

==== Rebellion ====
Sultan Muhammad left behind sons who were entitled to succeed him as Sultan when he died, namely Prince Abdullah, Prince Rahmat and Prince Amir. The children who were entitled to the throne died one by one, Prince Abdullah died of poisoning and strangulation, possibly on the orders of Tahmidullah II, then followed by Prince Rahmad killed on the orders of Sultan Tahmidullah II. The third son, Prince Amir realized what happened to his brothers, therefore before it was too late he asked to be allowed to leave the Banjar Sultanate on the grounds of performing the pilgrimage to Mecca. Tahmidullah II allowed it, because it meant that the only heir to the throne was no longer there. It turned out that Prince Amir did not go to Mecca to perform the hajj but he stopped at Paser to his uncle Arung Tarawe's place. Arung Tarawe agreed to provide assistance to Prince Amir, to attack Martapura, to seize the throne from Prince Nata Alam. This agreement caused the war and was the worst event for the Banjarmasin Sultanate, because in this war for the throne the Dutch and the Bugis people intervened. Thus, this war involved conflict between tribes, namely the Banjar people and the Bugis people, also involving the Dutch as a nation that wanted domination over Banjar.

In 1785, Prince Amir with the help of Arung Tarawe attacked Martapura. His troops with 3000 Bugis people with a strength of 60 boats departed from Paser via Cape South and landed at Tabanio, the largest pepper port of the Banjarmasin Sultanate. In Tabanio, Bugis troops killed commoners, destroyed pepper plantations, a potential source of trade for the Banjarmasin Sultanate and a source of income for the people, captured people and then made them into slaves by the Bugis people, this caused tribal conflict between the Bugis and Banjar tribes. Hal ini pula menyebabkan hilangnya simpati rakyat Banjar terhadap Pangeran Amir, sehingga rakyat Banjar tidak ada yang membantu perjuangan Pangeran Amir, suatu siasat yang merugikan Pangeran Amir sendiri. Although Prince Amir's attack was aimed at realizing revenge for the deaths of his father and brothers. This attack by Prince Amir caused Tahmidullah II to make a new contract with the VOC in 1787 to maintain the stability of his power so that it would remain in his hands and his lineage. The important things in the agreement were 4 points:

1. The Sultan handed over his areas of authority over Paser, Kingdom of Laut Island, Tabanio, Mendawai, Sampit, Pembuang, Kotawaringin to the VOC.
2. The Banjar Kingdom was a vassal of the VOC and the Sultan was quite satisfied with the "annual money".
3. The appointment of the crown prince and Prince Mangkubumi had to receive the approval of the VOC.
4. The Banjar Kingdom can only be ruled by the descendants of Tahmidullah II.

Tahmidullah II realized that due to the attack by Prince Amir with the Bugis troops, only the VOC could save him, therefore there was no other choice for Tahmidullah II, that he had to ask for help from the VOC to expel the Bugis troops. Tahmidullah II planned that the Netherlands should be used as a shield to protect its sovereignty, remaining tied to the Sultanate but not as a ruler.

These agreements were written in two languages, namely Dutch and Malay written in Jawi script. The contents of the agreement describe an important political situation, namely the time of the Bugis invasion led by Prince Amir. The name of Prince Amir was not found in the invasion that shook the kingdom, but the invasion of the Bugis people was the assistance of Prince Tarawe, Prince Amir's uncle. The presence of the Dutch Company troops to help Tahmidullah II, was a savior against the destruction of Tahmidullah II's government. That is why in the points of the agreement the position of the Dutch Company shows a dominant position. Even more tragic is the position of the Banjar Sultanate as only a borrowed kingdom from the Dutch East Indies Company. In the Acte van Afstand it is stated that the position of the Banjar Sultanate as a borrowed kingdom, was actually the result of deliberations of all the kingdom's dignitaries.

The royal dignitaries who witnessed all the agreements made and signed them, apart from Tahmidullah II, Prince Ratu Sultan Sulaiman and Prince Prince Adam were:

1. Prince Mangku Dilaga
2. Prince Aria Mangku Negara
3. Prince Isa
4. Prince Zainal
5. Prince Marta
6. Gusti Tasan
7. Mangkubhumi Ratu Anom Ismail

Meanwhile, the leaders of the Kiai group also signed:

1. Kiai Surengrana (Note: Kyai Ingabehi Surengrana came from Margasari and held the position of Puspawana, an officer who took care of livestock, hunting fields, and rivers for fish supplies for the palace residents).)
2. Kiai Tumenggung
3. Kiai Martadangsa
4. Kiai Maesa Jaladeri
5. Kiai Rangga
6. Kiai Jayengpati
7. Kiai Durapati
8. Kiai Surajaya
9. Kiai Jayadirana
10. Kapitan Kartanegara.

==== Kotawaringin's Involvement ====
Prince Prabu (mangkubhumi of Ratu Bagawan Muda, King of Kotawaringin) had taken part of the war launched by Prince Amir against the Banjarmasin government by siding with Tahmidullah II. Prince Prabu had also helped Tahmidullah II in the war against the Sultanate of Sambas.

==== Dutch aid and the capture of Prince Amir ====
The Dutch sent aid under the leadership of Hoffman, in addition to being the Dutch representative in the newly made contract issue, also as the leader of aid to expel the Bugis troops from the Banjarmasin Sultanate. Tahmidullah II's troops together with the Banjar people and assisted by the VOC troops succeeded in expelling the Bugis troops, and capturing Prince Amir and then exiled to Ceylon. The victory of this war meant victory for Tahmidullah II to obtain the inheritance rights for the lineage of Sultan Kuning. The end of the war against Prince Amir also meant the end of the conflict during the 18th century between the descendants of Sultan Kuning and the descendants of Tamjidillah I of Banjar in the Banjar Sultanate. The victory of this war for the Dutch, was also a great advantage because, the Dutch aid was not in vain and the prize of the victory for the Netherlands was very large. Political rights were in the hands of the Dutch over the Sultanate of Banjarmasin even the Sultanate of Banjar was no more than a vassal of the Dutch. The exile of Prince Amir and political support for Tahmidullah II in 1787 was the first evidence of direct Dutch intervention in the kingdom. Although in reality, the victory that the Dutch obtained was only temporary, because Prince Nata now began to plan a strategy to expel the Dutch power from the Sultanate of Banjarmasin. Not with armed force but with trade tactics.

=== Agreements with the Netherlands ===
In the Treaty of 13 August 1787, which consisted of 36 articles, the position of the Banjar Sultanate as a borrowed kingdom was further detailed, so that the territory of the Banjar Sultanate was not as large as the previous territory. In the Treaty it is also explained that the Banjar Sultanate releases the lands of Pasir with its conquered areas; Pulau Laut along with all that is in the vicinity; Tabaniau along with its coast, mountains and half of Dusun, Tatas (Banjarmasin) and Tanah Dayak with Mendawai, Sampit, Pembuang, Kotawaringin.

Foreigners other than Europeans are people who are not children of Banjar people. The Chinese people, Bugis people, Makassar people, Mandar people and Balinese people in the agreement are grouped as foreigners and they are subject to the Law of the Dutch East India Company. Thus, if these foreigners committed crimes, they were punished based on the laws of the Dutch East Indies Company, even though their actions were within the Banjar Sultanate. Especially for Chinese who had conducted trade with Banjar people and within the Banjar Sultanate. While other foreigners had to obtain approval from the Dutch East Indies Company first.

The Tract of 13 August 1787 contained an agreement of friendship for mutual safety and was signed by Tahmidullah II, Prince Sulaiman, and Prince Adam. While the seal was signed by Mangkubhumi Ratu Anom Ismail. In this Tract, Tahmidullah II stamped the name "Sunan Nata Alam". The Tract dated 13 August 1787 was written using Arabic-Malay letters in Malay language and using Latin letters in Dutch language.

==== Proclamation of October 1, 1787 ====
Tahmidullah II's diplomatic victory that the ruler of the Kingdom was a descendant of Tahmidullah II, was further strengthened in the Proclamation of October 1, 1787.

The proclamation, apart from stating that the Banjar Kingdom was a kingdom borrowed from the Dutch East India Company, also emphasized that the descendants of Tahmidullah II had the right to rule the kingdom.

... Lagipula tahta kerajaan itu Tuan Yang Maha Bangsawan Gurnadur Jenderal dan Raden van Indie menyerahkan pula dari pihak mana Kompeni Wilanduwi seperti ariyati barang pinjaman yang baka tiada boleh mati kepada Tuan yang Maha Mulia Paduka Seri Sultan Soleman Sa'idallah agar diperintah dan menyelenggarkan tahta kerajaan ...
... Moreover, the royal throne was an eternal loan given by the Most Noble Lords Gurnadur General and Raden van Indie to the Most Noble Lord Paduka Seri Sultan Soleman Sa'idallah to rule and manage the kingdom. ...

In this agreement, Tahmidullah II referred to himself as "Paduka Seri Sultan Soleman Sa'idallah", while his grandson was "Sultan Adam Alwasikubillah", all of whom signed the agreement. In the Treaty of 1 October as an explanation of the Proclamation of 1 October, Mangkubumi is referred to as "Wazir mu'adlam". In this Declaration/Proclamation of 1 October 1787, Tahmidullah II was referred to as "the Most High Lord, Paduka Seri Sultan Salehman Sa'idallah I" and his son as "Prince Ratu Sultan Salehman" and his grandson as "Sultan Adam".

The proclamation was subsequently signed by Tahmidullah II.

Original

Bahwa Paduka Gurnadur Djenderal Mister Willem Arnold Alting dan Segala Tuan2 Raden van India sudah melihat dan sudah membatja surat waad perdjandjian sahabat bersahabat dan berkasih-kasihan jang selama-lamanja pada antara Kompeni Welanduwi dengan Radja jang sangat mulia Paduka Seri Sultan Soleman Sa'idallah Radja atas tachta keradjaan negeri Bandjar didirikan serta dikuntjikan oleh Kristopel Hopman jang telah beroleh kuasa dan wakil akan itu daripada pihak musjawarat jang maha tinggi dalam India jaitu pada suatu pihak dan Radja jang sangat mulia jang tersebut Paduka Seri Sultan Salehman Sa'idallah dan Sultan Salehman jang akan Ganti kedudukan ajahandahnja Radja jang tersebut beserta dengan jang maha mulia ampunja tjutju Sultan Adam tambahan lagi dengan Wazir mu'adlam Ratu Anum Isma'il beserta dengan lain radja2 dan orang besar2 dari tachta dan istana keradjaan negeri Bandjar jaitu pada pihak lain. Maka Paduka Gurnadur Djenderal dan Raden van India dengan surat ini mengatakan sebagaimana berbunji surat kontrak jang tersebut dengan bahasa Welanduwi sebegitu juga dikabulkan dan ditakadkan itu seperti mana dikabulkan dan mentakadkan itu dengan surat ini. Maka dari sebab itu djuga diperdjandjikan kontrak itu akan dipeliharakan dan akan turut pada segenap bunjinja dari pada pihak Kompeni dengan tiada berkeputusan tambahan lagi segala orang takluk kepada perintah Kompeni akan disuruh peliharakan dan menurut itu. Maka diraklat itulah surat perdjandjian sahabat-bersahabat dan berkasih-kasihan itu jang kami ini kabulkan dan mentakadkan kami ini tetapkan dan teguhkan dengan kami ini ampunja tapak2 tangan sendiri beserta Kompeni jang Maha Mulia ampunja tjap besar adanja. Tamat alkalam.

Diputuskan dalam Kota Intan beserta dalam perhimpunan bitjara kami pada dua hari bulan Oktober tahun seribu tudjuh ratus delapan puluh tudjuh.

English

That His Majesty the Governor General Willem Arnold Alting and gentlemen Raden van Indie have seen and read the letter of agreement on forever friendly relations between the Dutch Company and the Mulu King Paduka Seri Sultan Sulaiman Saidullah I, the reigning king on the throne of the Banjar Kingdom as established and stipulated by Christopher Hoffman. As has been discussed by a party and His Majesty the King, His Majesty Sultan Sulaiman Saidullah I, regarding Sultan Sulaiman Saidullah II who will replace his father as king, along with his grandson, Sultan Adam, plus the Wazir mu'adlam Ratu Anom Ismail along with other kings and important people from the throne and palace of the Banjar kingdom. Therefore, His Majesty the Governor-General and Raden van India with this letter declare, as the part that reads in Dutch, that is what is upheld. Therefore, also, the contract will be maintained and will be obeyed by people who are subject to the company. So a letter of agreement on friendly relations has been signed which has been established with the palm of our own hands together with the palm of the Most Noble Company. The End.

Signed at Kota Intan by our delegation of spokesmen on October 2, 1787.

As a continuation of this Proclamation, the Sep. Article het Treaty of 13 August 1787, 22 April 1789 was then signed.

=== Conflict with the Dutch ===
Since the agreement of 1787 to 1797 was the biggest political drama of the Banjar Sultanate with Tahmidullah II as the main actor. All VOC trade plans were sabotaged, river bandits were organized to rob Dutch ships, free trade with the nation went more crowded so that the VOC did not succeed in obtaining monopoly as mentioned in the 1787 contract. The most successful strategy carried out by Tahmidullah II was to destroy the pepper plantations so that the pepper production population was at a minimum.

By 1793 the pepper trade had declined significantly, coupled with pirates closing the mouth of the Barito River, thus crippling VOC trade. Regarding the failure of Dutch trade in Banjarmasin, the following is stated:

... Betul-betul licin orang-orang Banjar itu terhadap suatu "Grootmacht" seperti VOC yang telah berpengalaman dua abad lebih mengenai soal-soal Banjar, begitu lamanya mereka dengan diam-diam menyembunyikan sebab-sebab sebenarnya daripada kegagalan pengluasan kekuasaan VOC. Baru lama kemudian setelah perlawanan diam-diam ini tak perlu dirahasikan lagi, VOC mengerti bahwa dia telah bertahun-tahun ditipu.
... The Banjar people had acted very cunningly towards a "Grootmacht" like the VOC which had had two centuries or more of experience in interacting with the Banjar. They secretly hid the real cause of the failure of the VOC expansion efforts for a very long time. After a while, this kind of silent resistance was no longer useful. The VOC had realized that they had been deceived for years.

For the Dutch, Banjarmasin was merely an expense item and did not generate any profit at all, in fact it caused losses, so that for the Dutch, maintaining continued relations with Banjarmasin became a heavy burden. After seeing the success of the politics carried out, Tahmidullah II sent an envoy to Penang, the trading center of the British Empire to jointly expel the Dutch from the Banjarmasin kingdom. Likewise, an envoy was sent to Batavia, bringing a request for the VOC to leave Banjarmasin.

=== Final years ===
In 1797, the Dutch East India Company (VOC) sent commissioner François van Boekholtz to Banjarmasin and made the 1797 contract which was so humiliating for the VOC that the VOC finally left Banjarmasin. At that time, Francois van Boekholtz held talks with Prince Sulaiman, Prince Adam and Mangkubhumi Ratu Anom Ismail at the Bumi Kencana Palace, Martapura regarding issues concerning the contract made in 1787.

Boekholtz's arrival met the Sultan and officials of the royal palace because previously there were several negative issues regarding the 1787 agreement, especially on the part of the Banjar Sultanate, there was an attitude of ignoring all the contents of the agreement and an attitude of canceling all of the agreement. During the ten years of the agreement, it turned out that the Dutch Company made no profit at all. According to Commissioner van Boekholtz, the failure of the agreement was based on two main problems, namely:

1. The failure of the pepper trade monopoly which was previously expected to bring enormous profits to the Dutch East India Company, and
2. The Sultan's attitude was considered insincere in repaying the Dutch East India Company's kindness for helping the Banjar Sultanate to destroy Prince Amir's invasion with Bugis-Paser troops.

Discussions with the royal officials resulted in the conclusion that the Sultan and all the royal officials proposed that the Sultan hold the entire Banjar region absolutely and rule no longer on the basis of loans from the company. Considering that the implementation of the 1787 agreement resulted in losses for the Dutch East India Company, coupled with the difficulties faced by Europeans in supervising the implementation of the pepper and other trade monopolies, and difficulties due to different customs, especially regarding the practice of ngayau by the Dayak people, plus the fact that the journey was very long, finally the Dutch East India Company made an agreement in 1789 which was very detrimental and showed its diplomatic defeat. The agreement consisted of 13 articles and was signed at Bumi Kencana, the Sultan's palace and in Batavia. The palace dignitaries who also signed were: Prince Ratu Sulaiman Saidullah II, Prince Adam, Tahmidullah II, Mangkubhumi Ratu Anom Ismail, Prince Ishak and Prince Hasin. From the Dutch East Indies Company were: Van Boekholtz as Commissioner, A.W. Jorissen, Wm. Bloem, A.B. Dietz, S.H. Rose Seer and Pieter Gerardus van Overstraten.

The third article of the agreement stated that the Dutch East Indies Company determined that Sultan Sulaiman Saidullah II had the power to rule over the company's land and that the Sultan would also maintain the Kingdom as his own property. All profits from the kingdom's products, including all kinds of bird's nests and all trade commodities that were previously the rights of the Dutch East Indies Company, were now handed over to the Sultan.

The fourth article stipulates that sovereignty over the Paser and Pulau Laut areas that had been taken by the company, was returned to the Sultan. The costs incurred by the Dutch East India Company to fulfill the contents of the 1787 agreement were not comparable to the results that the Dutch had previously expected. In other words, in maintaining its position against the Banjar Sultanate, the Dutch East India Company was faced with the risk of incurring very large costs.

Tahmidullah II has played a very important role in the politics of the Banjarmasin kingdom and succeeded in maintaining the sovereignty and integrity of the Banjar Sultanate from the domination of Dutch colonialism. Although he was the one who handed over the sovereignty of the kingdom to the VOC, in its development he soon realized his mistake, so he then ordered the destruction of the pepper plantations controlled by the Dutch and immediately established relations with British Empire. The decline of the Dutch East Indies Company's economy and income can be seen from the contents of Article 10 which states that the Dutch East Indies Company's obligation to pay annually to Prince Prabu 250 reals and to Queen Prabu 50 reals as stipulated in the contract made by Commissioner Cr. Hoffman, the Dutch East Indies Company stated that it could not pay it. This situation closed with the death of Tahmidullah II in 1801.

== Death ==
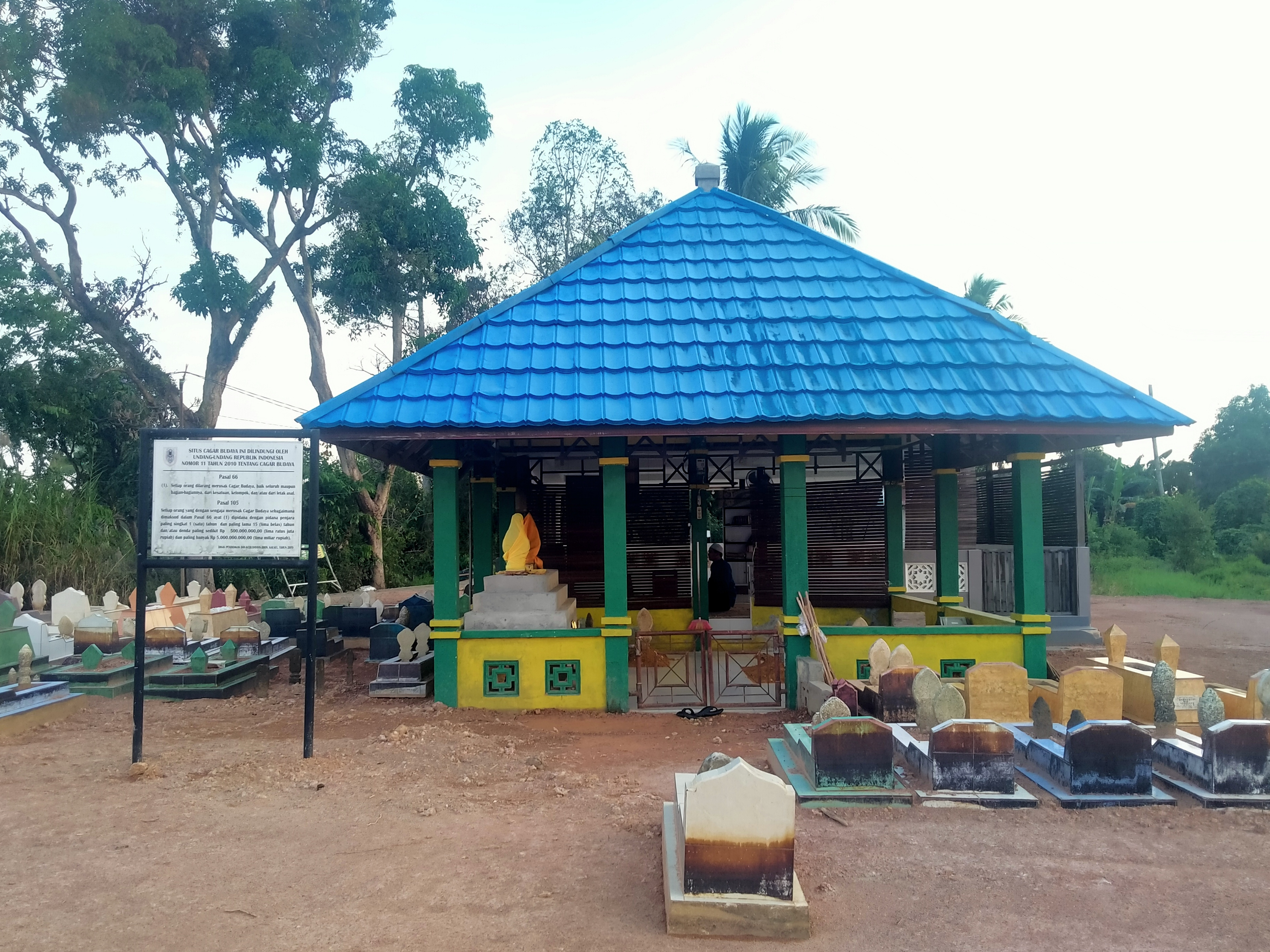
The tomb of Sultan Tahmidullah II in the village of Dalam Pagar, Martapura, Banjar Regency.

In some literature it is written that Tahmidullah II died in 1808. But in fact, Tahmidullah II had died in 1801 (c. 1216 AH). In the Acte Van Renovatie 19 April 1802, namely the deed of inauguration of Sulaiman of Banjar, son of Putra Tahmidullah in 1802, article 1 states that "Panembahan Batu", the posthumous name of Tahmidullah II, had died and was replaced by his son. (Note: ACTE VAN RENOVATIE as of 19 APRIL 1802 entitled: Acte van Renovatie en Vernieuwing der Contracten tergeleegenheid van de Installatie van den SULTAN SOLIMAN AMOH TAMIT ALALAH op den 19de April Anno 1802. (Law on Renovation and Renewal of Contracts for the Installation of Sultan Sulaiman Al-Mu'tamid 'Alâ Allâh dated April 19, 1802). In article 1, written in Jawi letters and in Malay language reads:... Paduka Seri Sultan Almo'tamid Aliallah dari dia punja Bapa Tuan Penembahan Batu meninggal dunia sudah dapat itu tachta keradjaan kuat kuasa sendiri dibawah Kompeni di Betawi Gubernur Komisaris Pransuis pan Bukul sudah dapat wakil kuasa dari orang besar di Betawi perangkat hormat Seri Sultan selamat pegang itu tachta keradjaan berwaad setiawan dengan perkara2 djandji2 jang terang dalam kontrak2 dan sumpah diatas setia sumpah jang didjandjikan dahulu ...... Father of His Majesty Seri Sultan al-Mu'tamid Ala Allah, Panembahan Batu has passed away and inherited the royal throne under the representation of the Company, Commissioner François van Boekholtz paid their respects and congratulated Seri Sultan for holding the throne faithfully for the things promised in previous contracts ...) The tomb of Sultan Tahmidullah II is located in Dalam Pagar, East Martapura, Banjar Regency.

== Notes ==
Tahmidullah II of Banjar House of Banjarmasin Born: 1727 Died: 1801
Preceded by Muhammad of Banjar	Sultan of Banjar; 1761 – 1801	Succeeded by Sulaiman of Banjar
Political offices
Preceded by Prince Nullah	Mangkubhumi; 1759 – 1761	Succeeded by Ratu Anom Kasuma Yuda
