= Battles of Mount Pamaton =

- Part of Banjarmasin War
Date	19 June 1861 – 2 March 1862 (8 months, 1 week and 4 days)
Location	Sultanate of Banjar, Borneo
Result	Dutch victory

Belligerents
Sultanate of Banjar	Dutch Empire

Commanders and leaders
Hidayatullah II (surrendered); Demang Lehman; Tumenggung Gamar; Raksapati; Kiai Cakrawati	Mayor Koch; Lieutenant Grimm †

Strength
5,400+	Unknown

Casualties and losses
Unknown	Unknown

The Battles of Mount Pamaton consisted of two fierce engagements between the Sultanate of Banjar and the Dutch colonial empire on Pamaton mountain in Borneo.

== Background ==
On June 1861, the Banjarmasin forces, under the command of Hidayatullah, were on Mount Pamaton. The Dutch planned to attack Pamaton. After that, they countered the attack on Martapura by Hidayatullah and also captured the fort on Martapura which was used by Banjar forces.

== Battles ==
The Banjarmasin had come to Pamaton Mountain where they were welcomed by the native people on the mountain and planned to attack Dutch, but the plan was leaked to Dutch and the Dutch prepared to attack them instead.

The attack occurred on the fort of Pamaton, where the Dutch had many soldiers and weapons to attack. But the attack failed, and many commanders were killed or wounded. This attack resulted in a loss for the Dutch and a Banjarmasin victory.
