= List of rulers of Banjar =

The following is a list of the rulers of Banjar, which is a list of figures who have led Banjar people and the whole of South Kalimantan, both traditionally and officially. This list is compiled based on a comparison of the timeline between each traditional and administrative power.

Traditionally, the ruler of Banjar is the 22nd Sultan of Banjar, al-Mu'tasim Billah. While administratively, the Banjar region is under Indonesian occupation, and is led by the Governor of South Kalimantan.

== Ancient kingdoms ==
Nan Sarunai was an ancient civilization of the Ma'anyan Dayak people that was founded in 1309 until its collapse in 1389. This kingdom was annexed by Majapahit in 1354.

- Raden Japutra Layar (1309–1329)
- Raden Neno (1329–1349)
- Raden Anyan (1349–1355)

The King of the Kuripan Kingdom (?–1387) who is recorded only as the "Last King of Kuripan", who was the adoptive father of Ampu Jatmaka.

== Hindu–Buddhist kingdoms ==
=== Negara Dipa ===
The following is a list of rulers who ruled Negara Dipa:

- Ampu Jatmaka or Maharaja di Candi (1387–1450)
- Lambung Mangkurat (1450–1460)
- Princess Junjung Buih (1460–1470)
- Maharaja Suryanata
- Maharaja Suryawangsa
- Maharaja Carang Laleyan
- Princess Kalungsu

The Negara Dipa was a protectorate of Majapahit after Nan Sarunai was annexed by Majapahit in 1354.

=== Negara Daha ===
Raden Sekar Sungsang changed the name of the country from "Negara Dipa" to "Negara Daha".

- Raden Sekar Sungsang, also known by his regnal name Maharaja Sari Kaburungan (1495–1500)
- Maharaja Sukarama or Ratu Anom
- Maharaja Mangkoe Boemi
- Prince Tumenggung (?–1520)

== Islamic kingdoms ==
=== Sultanate of Banjar ===
The Sultanate of Banjar was founded by Sultan Surianshah in 1526, when he converted to Islam and changed his kingdom system into a sultanate. The Banjar Sultans were usually given the title of Panembahan or Susuhunan posthumously. The following is a list of rulers who ruled during the sultanate era:

No.	Picture	Regnal name	Reign	Mangkubhumi
Sovereign Sultan
1		Surianshah of Banjar سوريان شاه متن بنجر	1520 (Note: As King of Banjar)/1526 – 1540	Patih Masih (1520–?); Prince Rahmatullah (?–1546)
2		Rahmatullah of Banjar رحمة الله متن بنجر	1540 – 1570	Prince Hidayatullah; Kiai Anggadipa (1570–1595)
3		Hidayatullah I of Banjar هداية الله ١ متن بنجر	1570 – 1595	Kiai Anggadipa; Kiai Jayanagara (1595–1642)
4		Mustain Billah of Banjar مستعين بالله متن بنجر	1595 – 1642	Kiai Jayanagara; Kiai Tumenggung Raksanagara (1595–1642); Prince Dipati Tuha I
5		Inayatullah of Banjar عناية الله متن بنجر	1642 – 1645	Prince di Darat
6		Saidullah of Banjar سعيد الله متن بنجر	1645 – 1660	Prince di Darat; Ratu Bagawan of Kotawaringin; Prince Dipati Mangkubumi
7		Rakyatullah of Banjar رعاية الله متن بنجر	1660 – 1663	Prince Mas Dipati; Prince Aria Wiraraja
8		Tahlilullah of Banjar تهليل الله متن بنجر	1663 – 1679	—
9		Sultan Agung of Banjar سلطان اڬوڠ متن بنجر	1663 – 1679	Prince Aria Wiraraja; Prince Purbanagara
—		Tahlilullah of Banjar تهليل الله متن بنجر	1679 – 1708; 2nd reign	Prince Suria Nagara
10		Tahmidullah I of Banjar تحميد الله ١ متن بنجر	1700 – 1717	Panembahan Kasuma Dilaga; Prince Purabaya
11		Panembahan Kusuma Dilaga ڤانمبهان كوسوم دلاڬ	1717 – 1730	Prince Hamidullah
12		Hamidullah of Banjar حامد الله متن بنجر	1730 – 1734	Prince Suria Dilaga; Prince Sepuh
13		Tamjidillah I of Banjar تمجيد الله ١ متن بنجر	1734 – 1759	Pangeran Nullah
14		Muhammad of Banjar محمد متن بنجر	1759 – 1761	Prince Nata Dilaga
15		Tahmidullah II of Banjar تحميد الله ٢ متن بنجر	1761 – 1801	Ratu Anum Kasuma Yuda; Prince Sulaiman Saidullah
16		Sulaiman of Banjar سليمان متن بنجر	1801 – 1825	Ratoe Anom Ismail; Prince Mangkoe Boemi Nata
Dutch Protectorate
17		Adam of Banjar آدم متن بنجر	1825 – 1857	Prince Mangkoe Boemi Nata; Ratoe Anom Mangkoeboemi Kentjana; Prince Tamjidillah II (Note: appointed by Dutch); Prince Prabu Anom
18		Tamjidillah II of Banjar تمجيد الله ٢ متن بنجر	1857 – 1859	Prince Hidayatullah
Opposition government
19		Hidayatullah II of Banjar هداية الله ٢ متن بنجر	1859 – 1862	Prince Wira Kasuma
20		Prince Antasari ڤڠيرن انتساري	1862	Panembahan Muhammad Said
Pagustian Government (1862–1905)
21		Muhammad Seman محمد سمن	1862 – 1905	Panembahan Muhammad Said; Prince Perbatasari; Gusti Berakit
Since the 2010 Restoration
22		al-Mu'tasim Billah المعتصم بالله	2010 – now	Prince Chairiansyah

=== Kusan and Laut Island ===
The following is a list of the ruling kings of Kusan Kingdom and Kingdom of Laut Island:

- Prince Amir bin Sultan Muhammadillah (King of Kusan)
- Prince Haji Muhammad (leader of Sela Selilau)
- Prince Haji Musa bin Prince Haji Muhammad as the king of Batulicin, Kusan (1830-1840).
- Pangeran Muhammad Nafis ibn Pangeran Musa Raja Batulicin, Kusan (1840-1845)
- Pangeran Jaya Sumitra bin Pangeran Musa (since 1845), King Kusan and the Sea Island
- Prince Abdul Khadir bin Prince Musa, King of the land of Kusan, Batulicin and Laut Island.
- Prince Berangta Kasuma bin Prince Abdul Kadir (1873-1881) Raja Pulau Laut
- Prince Amir Husin Kasuma bin Prince Berangta Kasuma (1881-1900) King of Laut Island
- Prince Abdurrahman Kasuma bin Berangta Kasuma (10 January 1900 - 7 January 1903) King of Laut Island
- Prince Muhammad Aminullah Kasuma bin Prince Amir Husin Kasuma (acting, 7 January 1903 - 3 April 1903)

=== Pagatan and Kusan ===
Here is a list of the Kings of Kusan and Pagatan:

1. Prince Amir bin Sultan Muhammadillah (Raja Kusan)
2. Prince Musa (1830-1840).
3. Prince Muhammad Nafis (1840-1845)
4. Prince Jaya Sumitra (since 1845), Raja Kusan dan Pulau Laut
5. Prince Abdul Khadir

Kings of Pagatan before unification:

1. Puwana Deke (1733-1784)
2. Hasan Pangewa (po 1784-?)
3. Radża Bolo/Arung Botto (regent ?-1838)
4. Arung Palewan Abd al-Rahim I (1838-1855) [anak Hasan]

Kings of the United Kingdom of Pagatan and Kusan:

- Radża Arung Abd al-Karim (1855-1871) [anak]
- Radża Arung Abd al-Dżabbar (1871-1875; regencja 1871-1875)
- Queen Arung Daeng Mengkau (1875-1883)
- Syarif Taha, as well as the King of Batulicin (regent 1883-1885)
- Prince Mangkoe Boemi Daëng Machmoed (regent 1885-1893)
- Radża Arung Abd al-Rahim II Andi Sallo (1893-1908)
- Kerapatan (regent) (1908-1912)

=== Kingdom of Tanah Bumbu ===
The following is a list of the rulers of the Tanah Bumbu Kingdom:

- Prince Dipati Tuha ibn Sultan Saidullah
- Prince Mangu bin Pangeran Dipati Tuha
- Ratu Mas of Tanah Bumbu

== Dutch East Indies ==
=== Gouvernur Borneo ===
No.	Photo	Governor	Start term	End term	Notes
Gouvernur Borneo
1		A. L. Weddik	1845	1846	Commissaris-inspecteur voor Borneo, Riouw en Lingga (1845) Gouvernur van Borneo en Onderhoorigheden (28 February 1846–1849)
2		Bauke Jan Haga	1938	1942	

== Japanese occupation ==
Initially, the military administration of Minami Borneo or Dutch Borneo was under the jurisdiction of the Southwest Area Fleet led by a commander-in-chief, who then appointed a superintendent general or chief civil administrator or 総官 (sōkan) for the civil administration. The sōkan supervised the Navy Civil Administration Office (Japanese: 民政府, romanized: minseifu) established in Makassar.

Japanese controls:

- Shū (州), former Residency, if a Residency overlaps with the position of the Minseibu, such as the Zuider-en-Oosterafdeeling van Borneo residency with Banjarmasin as its capital, then it becomes a "Direct Government Area" under the Minseibu, in this case, the Minseibu Borneo.
- Bunken (分遣, area) symbolizes the Dutch Afdeeling.

The indigenous people dominate:

- Gun (郡) or district, a new grouping of former onderdistricts
- Fukugun (副郡), representing the landscape of the outermost islands which is equivalent to an onderdistrict or assistant district in Java.
- Son (村) or Kampung (village), a former quasi-village level.

During the Japanese occupation, the Banjar region was specifically led by the Civil Government Leader (Indonesian: Pimpinan Pemerintahan Civil, PCC). On February 12, 1942, the Japanese Empire Military Command issued a proclamation that the city of Banjarmasin and its area were handed over to the PPC government, whose members were:

1. Pangeran Musa Ardi Kesuma
2. Sosodoro Djatikoesoemo
3. Mr. Roesbandi

PPC is headquartered in the former office of Governor Haga, the former governor of Borneo.

== United States of Indonesia ==
=== Bandjar Region ===
During the RIS government, Banjar became a state unit that stood alone as an autonomous region (not a state) of the RIS.

No	Picture	Name	Reign	Notes
1		Mohammad Hanafiah	1948–1950	Regional Mayor, governed in Banjarmasin from January to November 1948 until finally moving to Banjarbaru until 1950.

=== Governor of Kalimantan ===
The following is a list of governors of Kalimantan Province, which existed between 1945–1957 until it was divided again into South Kalimantan (Banjar), Central Kalimantan, West Kalimantan, and East Kalimantan (which was later divided again into North Kalimantan):

No.	Photo	Governor	Start term	End term	Notes
1		Prince Muhammad Noor	19 Agustus 1945	14 Agustus 1950	
2		Murdjani	19 Agustus 1950	1953	
3		Mas Subarjo	1953	1955	
4.		Raden Tumenggung Arya Milono	1955	23 May 1957	

== Indonesia ==
The Banjar region became the province of South Kalimantan in 1957, split off from Kalimantan Province. The following is a list of Governors and acting Governors who governed the Province of South Kalimantan.

Governor of South Kalimantan
No.	Image	Governor (birth–death)	Start term	End term	In office	Notes	Deputy Governor	
1		Syarkawi (1907–?)	1957	1959	1			
2		Maksid (1917–1996)	1959	1963	2			
3		Aberani Sulaiman (1925–2001)	1963	1968	3			
4		Jamani (?)	1968	1970	4			
5		Subardjo Surosarojo (1928–1999)	1970	1980	5			
5		Subardjo Surosarojo (1928–1999)	1970	1980	6			
6		Mistar Cokrokusumo (1926–1984)	1980	1984	7			
7		Muhammad Said (1936–2022)	1984	1995	8			
7		Muhammad Said (1936–2022)	1984	1995	9		Gusti Hasan Aman (1992–95)	
8		Gusti Hasan Aman (b.1938)	1995	2000	10		Bachtiar Murad	
9		Sjachriel Darham (1945–2014)	2000	March 2005	11		Husin Kasah	
10		Rudy Ariffin (b.1953)	5 August 2005	5 August 2010	12		Rosehan Noor Bahri	
10		Rudy Ariffin (b.1953)	5 August 2010	5 August 2015	13		Rudy Resnawan	
11		Sahbirin Noor (b.1967)	12 February 2016	12 February 2021	14		Rudy Resnawan	
11		Sahbirin Noor (b.1967)	25 August 2021	13 November 2024	15	(Note: Sahbirin Noor resigns.)	Muhidin	
12		Muhidin (b.1958)	16 December 2024	Incumbent	15	(Note: Inaugurated to fill the vacancies of Governor of South Kalimantan for the 2021-2024 Period)		
Acting interim
Portrait		Acting	Party	Start term	End term	Period	Definitive governor	Ref.
		Abu Jazid Bustomi (acting) (1910–1987)	ABRI	May 1963	September 1963	—	Transition (1963)	
		Tursandi Alwi (Penjabat) (b.1950)	Independent	March 2005	9 August 2005	—	Transition (2005)	
		Tarmizi Abdul Karim (Penjabat) (b.1956)	Independent	10 August 2015	12 February 2016	—	Transisi (2015–2016)	
		Rudy Resnawan (tasks executor) (b.1961)	Independent	26 September 2020	5 December 2020	14	Sahbirin Noor	
		Roy Rizali Anwar (daily executor)	Independent	12 February 2021	15 February 2021	—	Transition (2021)	
		Safrizal Z.A. (acting) (b.1970)	Independent	15 February 2021	25 August 2021	—	Transition (2021)	
		Roy Rizali Anwar (daily executor)	Independent	13 November 2024	23 November 2024	15	Sahbirin Noor	(Note: The position should have been filled by Deputy Governor Muhidin as Acting Governor, but Muhidin is on campaign leave for the 2024 South Kalimantan Gubernatorial Election.)
		Muhidin (tasks executor) (b.1958)	PAN	24 November 2024	16 December 2024	15	Sahbirin Noor	(Note: Replacing Sahbirin Noor who resigned)
