= Mohammad Noor =

Indonesian politician

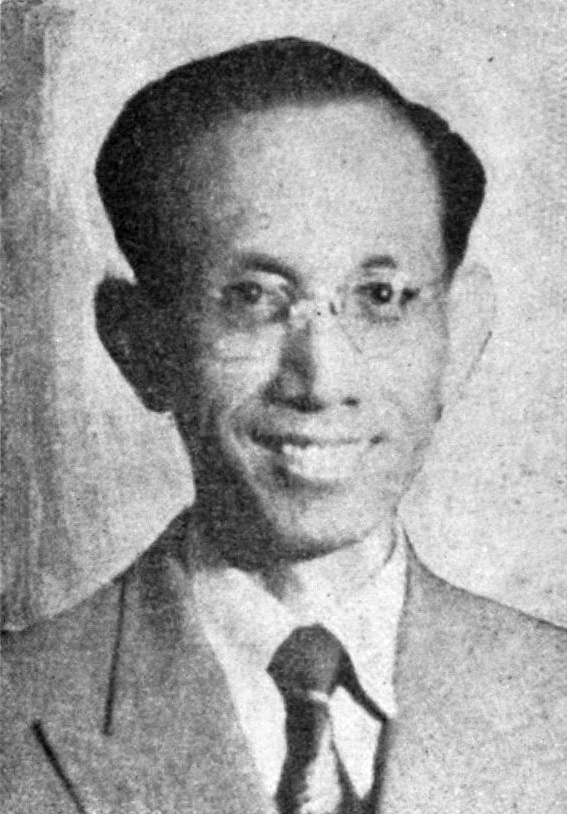
- Noor in 1954

13th minister of public works
- In office 24 March 1956 – 10 July 1959
- President: Sukarno
- Prime Minister: Ali Sastroamidjojo; Djuanda Kartawidjaja
- Preceded by: Soeroso
- Succeeded by: Sardjono Dipokusumo

Member of the Provisional House of Representatives
- In office 16 August 1950 – 24 March 1956

1st governor of Kalimantan
- In office 19 August 1945 – 14 August 1950
- Preceded by: Office established
- Succeeded by: Moerdjani

Personal details
- Born: 24 June 1901 Martapura, Dutch East Indies
- Died: 15 January 1979 (aged 77) Jakarta, Indonesia
- Party: Masyumi
- Spouse: Gusti Aminah
- Awards: National Hero of Indonesia

Mohammad Noor (24 June 1901 – 15 January 1979), known by his Indonesian name Pangeran Mohammad Noor (Note: This is the official name from the minister of social affairs, although most of the media writes it as "Pangeran Muhammad Noor".) and also written as P. M. Noor, was an Indonesian politician, independence fighter and first governor of Kalimantan. He was also member of the Investigating Committee for Preparatory Work for Independence and served as the minister of public works between 1956 and 1959.

== Early life ==
Mohammad Noor was born on 24 June 1901, in Martapura, South Kalimantan, from an aristocratic family of the Sultanate of Banjar. Mohammad Noor was the great-great-grandson (intah) of the 17th sultan of Banjar, Adam of Banjar. His father Prince Ali, was a district head, called kiai, moving from one city to another. When he reached adulthood, he received a title "Prince" (Pangeran).

After graduating from Hollandsch-Inlandsche School in 1917, he continued to Meer Uitgebreid Lager Onderwijs and graduated in 1921, then graduated from Hoogere Burgerschool in 1923, and in 1923 entered the Technische Hoogeschool te Bandoeng (THS) - a high technical school in Bandung. In 1927, he received the title of Engineer within four years, a year after Sukarno (the first president of the Republic of Indonesia) graduated as an engineer.

== Career ==
Pre-independence

After graduating Mohammad Noor worked at the Dutch East Indies, Ministry of Transport, Public Works and Water Management in the Irrigation Department at Tegal from 1927 to 1929, Malang from 1929 to 1931 and Batavia from 1931 to 1933.

Returning to Banjarmasin, he replaced his father as a member of Volksraad, for the region of Banjarmasin.

In 1942 during the Japanese occupation of the Dutch East Indies he was appointed as head of the irrigation department and in 1945, Deputy Secretary General of the Department of Transportation and Public Works.

== Death and honours ==
Noor died in Jakarta on 15 January 1979, 17 days after his wife, Gusti Aminah died. They were buried in Karet Bivak Cemetery before being moved to Sultan Adam Cemetery Complex, Martapura in June 2010. He was awarded the Mahaputera Star Class III in 1973 and declared a National Hero of Indonesia in 2018.

== Legacy ==
P. M. Noor is also used in a street name in several cities in Kalimantan, such as Samarinda, Palangka Raya, and Banjarbaru. A hydroelectric power station in Riam Kanan Reservoir was named after him.
