= Muhammad Seman =

Muhammad Seman محمد سمن
- Susuhunan Pagustian
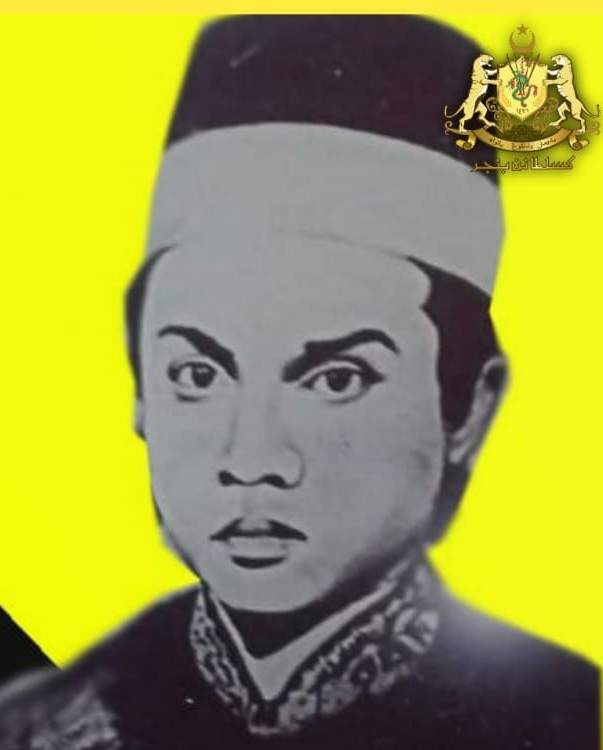
- Muhammad Seman, c. 1880.

Sultan of Banjar
- Reign: 8 November 1862 – 24 January 1905
- Predecessor: Prince Antasari
- Successor: al-Mu'tasim Billah (since restoration in 2010)
- Born: Gusti Mat Seman; 1836; Martapura, Banjar Sultanate
- Died: January 24, 1905 (aged 68–69); Baras Kuning, Dusun Ulu, Dutch East Indies
- Spouses: Nyai Banun; Nyai Salmah; Nyai Karsah; Nyai Koepan
- Issue: Pangeran Banjarmas; Ratu Dijah Intan; Ratu Zaleha; Pangeran Berakit; Pangeran Berkek
Regnal name
- كبوه دولي يڠ مها مليا ڤدوك سري سلطان محمد سمن; Kebawah Duli Yang Maha Mulia Paduka Seri Sultan Muhammad Seman
- House: Banjarmasin Dynasty
- Father: Pangeran Antasari
- Mother: Nyai Fatimah
- Religion: Sunni Islam

Muhammad Seman (1836 – 24 January 1905) was the Sultan of Banjar who led the temporary Pagustian government of the Banjar Sultanate in Murung Raya, from the death of his father Prince Antasari in 1862 until he was killed in 1905.

== Early life ==
His birth name was Gusti Matseman, he was born in 1836. He was the son of Prince Antasari who was called Pagustian, as the successor to the Banjar Sultanate which had been abolished by the Dutch. In the era of Sultan Muhammad Seman, the Banjar government was in Muara Teweh, at the head of the Barito river. Sultan Muhammad Seman is the son of Prince Antasari and Nyai Fatimah. Nyai Fatimah is the sister of Tumenggung Surapati. Sultan Muhammad Seman is the Sultan of Banjar who is of Dayak blood on his mother's side.

== Reign (1862-1905) ==
=== Accession ===
On March 3, 1862, Hidayatullah II was exiled to Cianjur, and eleven days after that, on March 14, 1862, Prince Antasari, who moved to the upper reaches of the Barito River, was crowned as the highest government leader in the Banjar Sultanate, in the presence of the Dayak tribal chiefs and the ruling dukes of the Dusun Atas, Kapuas and Kahayan. However, seven months after his coronation, Prince Antasari died on October 11, 1862, due to chicken pox.

Approximately a month after Prince Antasari death, on November 8, 1862, Muhammad Seman formed a kingdom with the capital city of Muara Teweh. The Dutch also used Muara Teweh as a defensive fort.

=== Resistance against the Dutch ===
Sultan Muhammad Seman at the end of August 1883 carried out operations in the Dusun Hulu area. He and his troops then moved to Telok Mayang and repeatedly attacked the Dutch post at Muara Teweh. Meanwhile, Pangeran Perbatasari, Sultan Muhammad Seman's nephew and son-in-law, held resistance against the Dutch in Pahu, Kutai area. However, the defeat he suffered caused him to be arrested in 1885.

Sultan Muhammad Seman tried to build a fort in the downstream area of the Taweh River. This effort made the Dutch then strengthen their post in Khayalan by adding new troops, and establishing another emergency post in Tuyun. In December 1886, Sultan Muhammad Seman's troops tried to sever ties between the two Dutch posts. Meanwhile, the fighter stronghold in Taweh was further strengthened by the arrival of relief troops and additional food transported through the forest. But on the other hand, Muhammad Seman's post is in danger. To the north and south of the fort new Dutch strongholds appeared which tried to block the entry of food into the fort. The situation around Muhammad Seman's fort is increasingly critical.

=== Battle of Baras Kuning Fort (1905) and death ===
At the Battle of Baras Kuning Fort, Sultan Muhammad Seman died as a martyr after defending the fort from the Dutch invasion. The death of Muhammad Seman quickly crushed the spirit of the sultanate's troops. The nobles who supported Muhammad Seman such as Gusti Acil, Gusti Arsyad, and Antung Durrakhman then surrendered to the Dutch government a few days later. Although the remnants of the sultanate's rebels such as Tumenggung Gamar who tried to rebel in Lok Tunggul, but failed, he and his troops were forced to retreat to Tanah Bumbu, where the final battle took place and resulted in the total defeat of the sultanate's troops.

Muhammad Seman House of Banjarmasin Born: 1836 Died: 1905
Preceded by Pangeran Antasari	Sultan of Banjar; 1862 –1905	Succeeded by al-Mu'tasim Billah of Banjar
