= Tamjidillah II of Banjar =

Tamjidillah II تمجيد الله ٢
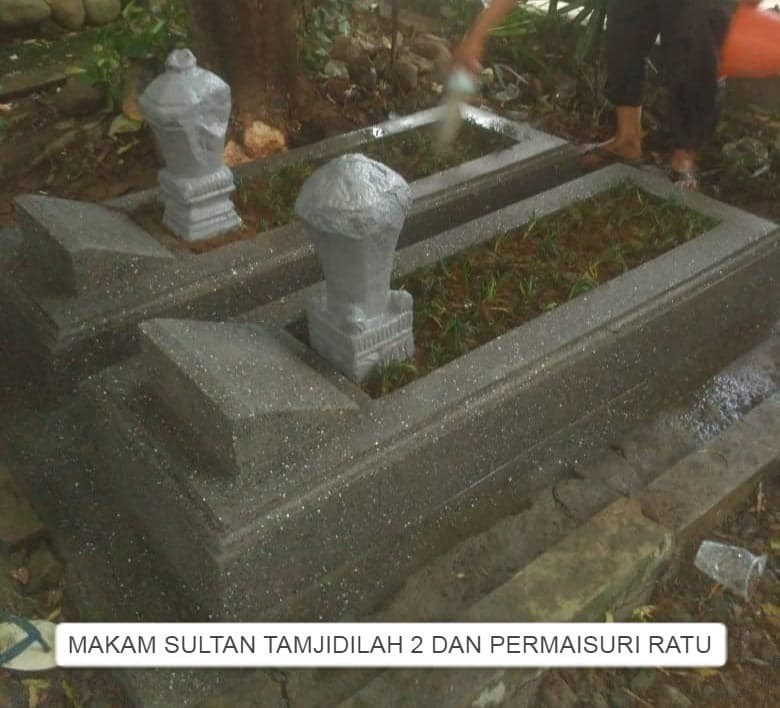
- Tomb of Tamjidillah II in Bogor, West Java

Sultan of Banjar
- Reign: 3 November 1857 – 25 June 1859
- Predecessor: Adam
- Successor: Hidayatullah II

Mangkubumi Banjar
- Reign: 7 September 1851 – 9 October 1856
- Predecessor: Ratoe Anom Mangkoeboemi Kentjana
- Successor: Prince Hidayatullah
- Born: Gusti Wayuri; 1819; Martapura, Banjar Sultanate
- Died: Unknown; Bogor, Dutch East Indies
- Spouses: Ratu Bandjer maas
- Issue: Pangeran Muhammad Amin; Goestie Sitie Ayer Maas; Pangeran Muhammad Amir; Pangeran Mahmud; Pangeran Abdul Karim; Ratu Ainun Jariah; Putri Saha
Regnal name
- توان كبوه دولي يڠ مها مليا ڤدوك سري سلطان تمجيد الله الواثق بالله; Tuan Kebawah Duli Yang Maha Mulia Paduka Seri Sultan Tamjidillah al-Watsiq Billah
- House: House of Banjarmasin
- Father: Crown Prince Abdur Rahman
- Mother: Nyai Besar Aminah
- Religion: Sunni Islam

Tamjidillah II was the Sultan of Banjar who ruled from 1857 to 1859, succeeding his grandfather, Adam of Banjar. His reign was opposed by his brother, Hidayatullah II of Banjar, which then led to the Banjarmasin War. He is the last Sultan of Banjar in the Dutch version.

== Early life ==
Prince Tamjidillah is the eldest son of Crown Prince Abdurrahman of Banjar with Nyai Biyar with the birth name Gusti Wayuri.
