= Tahlilullah of Banjar =

Tahlilullah تهليل الله
- Suria Angsa; Suriansyah II
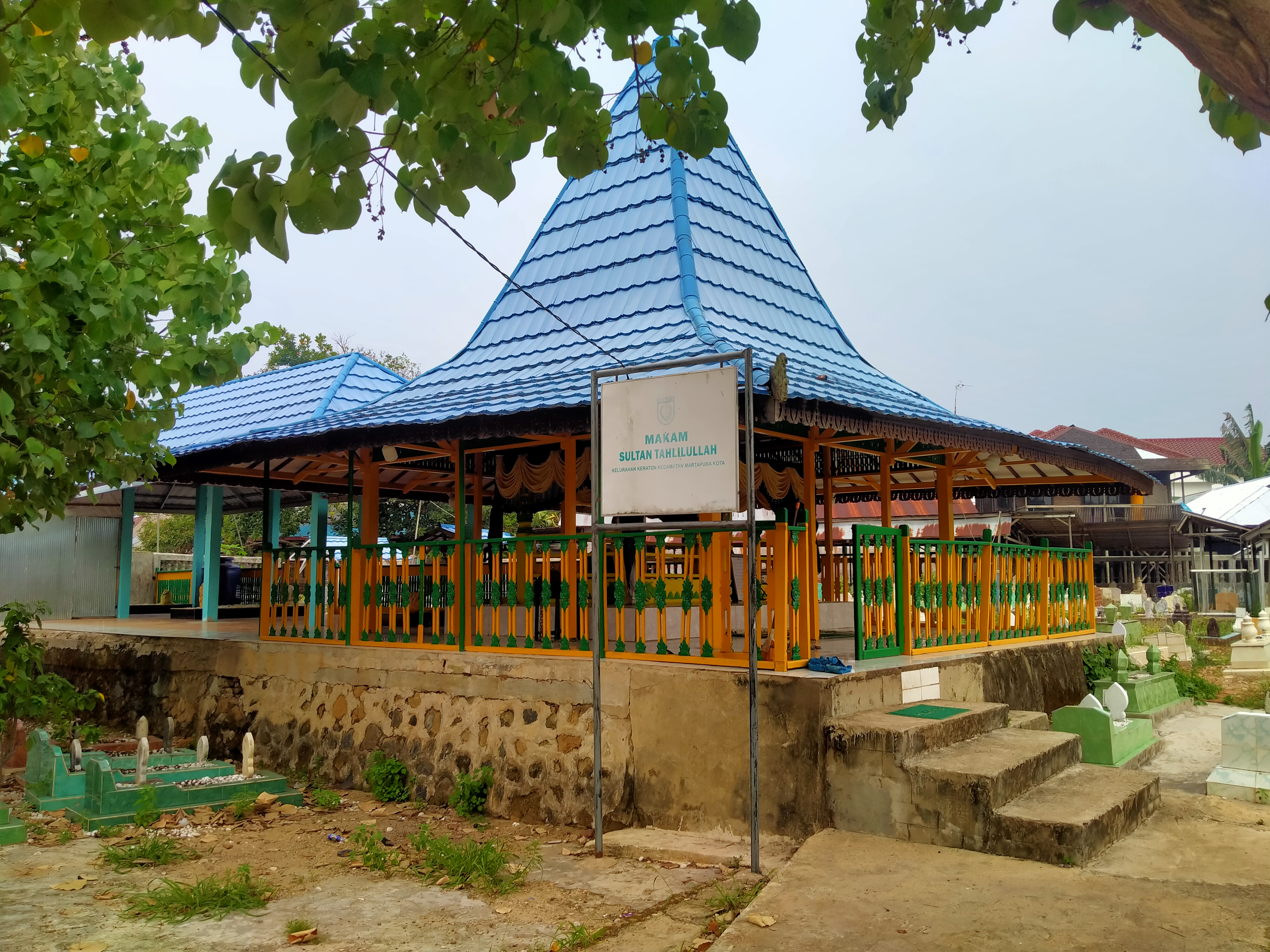
- Tahlilullah's Tomb at the Palace, Martapura, Banjar Regency.

Sultan of Banjar First Reign
- Reign: 1663 – 1679
- Predecessor: Rakyatullah
- Successor: Sultan Agung

Second Reign
- Reign: 1679 – 1708
- Predecessor: Sultan Agung
- Successor: Tahmidullah I
- Born: Raden Bagus c. 1654/55; Martapura, Banjar
- Died: 1708; Martapura, Sultanate of Banjar
- Burial: Dalam Pagar, Sultanate of Banjar
- Issue: List: Suria Alam; Panembahan Kesuma Dilaga; Pangeran Purba Negara
Regnal name
- توان يڠ مها مليا ڤدوك سري سلطان تهليل الله امرو الله باڬوس كاسوم; Tuan Yang Maha Mulia Paduka Seri Sultan Tahlilullah Amrullah Bagus Kasuma
Posthumous name
- امرو الله; Amrullah طاهر الله; Tahirullah
- House: House of Banjarmasin
- Father: Saidullah of Banjar
- Religion: Sunni Islam

Tahlilullah (c. 1654/55 – 1708), also known as Surianshah II and Amrullah, was the Sultan of Banjar who ruled from 1663 to 1708, his first reign lasted from 1663 to 1679, coinciding with the reign of his rival sultan, Sultan Agung of Banjar. After the assassination of Sultan Agung in 1679, Tahlilullah then became the sole ruler of Banjar who ruled until his death in 1708.

== Early life ==
Raden Bagus was the son of Saidullah of Banjar. When Sultan Saidullah died in 1660, Prince Ratu was appointed as the interim sultan until Raden Bagus was considered old enough to inherit the throne. According to the Hikayat Banjar, at the time of Sultan Saidullah's death, Raden Bagus was said to have passed the age of kepinggan or lost his milk teeth, while Raden Basus had just reached the age of kepinggan. So it is estimated that Raden Bagus was six to seven years old at the time of Saidullah's death, so his birth is estimated to have been between 1654 and 1655.
