= Sulaiman of Banjar =

16th Sultan of Banjar

Sulaiman سلیمان
- Sultan; Pangeran Ratu
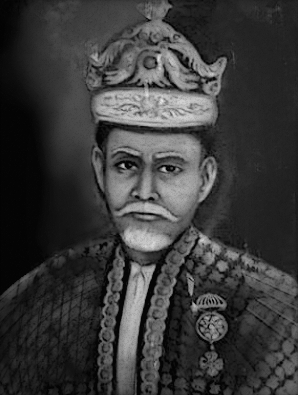
- Modern depiction of Sulaiman, painting by an unknown painter.

Sultan of Banjar
- Reign: 19 April 1801 – 3 June 1825 (24 years, 45 days)
- Predecessor: Tahmidullah II
- Successor: Adam
- Born: 16 Januari 1761; Karang Intan, Sultanate of Banjar
- Died: 3 June 1825 (aged 64); Lihung Langkar, Sultanate of Banjar
- Spouse: Empress Ratu Siti Gading (isteri tertua); Nyai Ratu Intan Sari (ibu suri); Nyai Rumangi; Nyai Unangan; Nyai Ratna; Nyai Ratu Kencana Kamala Sari; Nyai Sari Argi; Nyai Minah; Nyai Taesah; Nyai Cina
- Issue: Prince Adam, Prince Mangkoe Boemi Nata; Princess Hadji Moesa Salamah; Prince Perbatasari; Prince Kassir; Princess Soengging Anoem; Prince Dipati di Mahang (HST); Prince Ahmad; Prince Wahid; Prince Muhammad; Prince Kusairi; Prince Hasan; Prince Achmid; Prince Kasoema Widjaja (Berahim); Prince Tasin; Prince Singhasari; Prince Hamim; Queen Kartasari; Queen Syarif Marta; Queen Salamah; Queen Sjerief; Queen Hadijah
Regnal name
- كبوه دولي يڠ مليا سري سلطان سليمان سعيدالله ٢ رحمة الله المعتمد على الله; Kebawah Duli Yang Mulia Seri Sultan Sulaiman Saidullah II Rahmatullah al-Mu'tamid Ala Allah
Posthumous name
- ڤانمبهان سڤوه; Panembahan Sepuh
- House: Banjarmasin
- Father: Sulaiman Saidullah I
- Mother: Princess Lawiyah bint Muhammad

Sulaiman (16 January 1761 – 3 June 1825), also known as Sulaiman Saidullah II or al-Mu'tamid Ala Allah, was the Sultan of Banjar who ruled between 1801 and 1825, replacing Tahmidullah II of Banjar. His reign is known as one of the best Banjarese governments, with the re-take of areas previously handed over to the Dutch, although with Dutch influence growing stronger towards the end of his reign. He was the last Banjarese sultan to receive absolute power.

Sulaiman of Banjar House of Banjarmasin Born: 1761 Died: 1825
Preceded by Tahmidullah II of Banjar	Sultan of Banjar; 1801 –1825	Succeeded by Adam of Banjar
Political offices
Preceded by Muhammad Aliuddin Aminullah	Crown Prince; 1761 – 1801	Succeeded by Prince Ādam
