= Muhammad of Banjar =

14th Sultan of Banjar from 1759 to 1761

Muhammad محمد
- Ratu Anom; Seri Sultan

Sultan of Banjar
- Reign: 3 August 1759 – 16 January 1761
- Predecessor: Tamjidillah I
- Successor: Tahmidullah II
- Born: c. 1730; Kayu Tangi, Sultanate of Banjar
- Died: 16 January 1761 (aged 30–31); Martapura, Sultanate of Banjar
- Spouses: Queen Consort Muhammad; The younger sister of Gusti Aroeng Trawee
- Issue: Princess Lawiyah; Prince Kusin; Prince Abdullah; Prince Tumenggung; Princess Rabiah; Prince Amir
Regnal name
- كبوه دولي يڠ مها مليا ڤدوك سري سلطان محمد علي الدين امين الله; Kebawah Duli Yang Maha Mulia Paduka Seri Sultan Muhammad Aliuddin Aminullah
Posthumous name
- محمد الله; Muhammadillah; إحياء الدين; Ihya al-Din
- House: House of Tutus Tuha
- Father: Hamidullah
- Religion: Sunni Islam

Muhammad (c. 1730 – 16 January 1761), full title as Muhammad Aliuddin Aminullah was Sultan of Banjar who ruled from 1759 until his death in 1761. He ruled after carrying out a coup against his father-in-law, Tamjidillah I.

== Early life ==
=== Crown Prince ===
Prince Muhammad was probably born in 1730 or slightly later. As the eldest son of the reigning Sultan, Muhammad naturally held the position of Crown Prince. However, in 1734, Muhammad's father, Sultan Hamidullah died suddenly. Because he was not yet 18 years old, not even 5 years old, Muhammad could not be appointed as Sultan. Hamidullah's sudden death caused a conflict of interest in the struggle for power because his crown prince was not yet an adult when the Sultan died. According to tradition, Muhammad's uncle or Hamidullah's younger brother, Tamjidillah I of Banjar, was appointed as regent, so that when Muhammad came of age, the throne would be handed over to Muhammad.

However, it turned out that Prince Tamjidillah I as regent had a further strategy, namely he wanted to make the Sultan's power rights in his bloodline. For that, he married one of his daughters to Muhammad who had grown up. With the marriage, the crown prince certainly did not have the heart to ask for or even seize power from his father-in-law, who was the same as his own father. This marriage caused Muhammad to not be so eager to ask for the right to the throne of the Sultanate. Therefore, Tamjidillah I was able to rule for 25 years and appointed himself Sultan, while Muhammad maintained his status as Crown Prince.

During his time as Crown Prince, Prince Muhammad was known to have taken part in the Contract of 18 May 1747 made between the VOC and the Banjar Sultanate which was signed by Sultan Tamjidillah I. In the agreement, the Crown Prince signed with the name "Ratu Anom". This agreement later became the basis for the VOC to establish trade and political relations with the Banjar Sultanate until 1787.

=== Escape from the capital ===
Although not so eager for the throne, Muhammad still had ambitions for the throne, because he was the Crown Prince. This was realized by Sultan Tamjidillah I, who actually wanted only his direct line to inherit the position of sultan. Therefore, Tamjidillah I tried hard to keep Muhammad close to him, in order to be able to monitor him.

Muhammad, who felt constrained, wanted to take back his rights to the throne as the legitimate permanent heir of Sultan Hamidullah. He then contacted the Dutch East India Company (VOC) in Batavia for help. In response, the VOC held an agreement at Fort Tatas on October 27, 1756, the contents of which included recognizing and being ready to assist Muhammad, on the condition that Banjar become a Dutch protectorate. In addition, as a protectorate, Muhammad had to hand over 1000 pikuls of black pepper, 10 pikuls of white pepper, 11 carats of diamonds, and 100 fine reals as tribute to the Dutch. This condition was agreed to by Muhammad, but the uncertainty of the continuation of this agreement made Muhammad think that the VOC could not be relied on. Therefore, perhaps in early 1757, on his own initiative, Muhammad fled from the capital of Kayu Tangi when the Sultan was off guard. Prince Muhammad fled to Tabanio, an important pepper trading port in the south of the Banjar Sultanate.

Afterwards, Muhammad joined a group of pirates, robbing merchant ships and gathering his strength, while monitoring the situation and waiting for a good time to reclaim the throne from his uncle. Tabanio, was used as the main base of his group, and the records of a Western trader named Ring Holm mention Tabanio as the largest black market in Kalimantan. Meanwhile, Sultan Tamjidillah I became closer to the VOC, with other agreements signed afterward.

== Reign (1759–1761) ==
=== Coup d'etat ===
Muhammad joined the pirates for only two to three years, but in a short time he had led a pirate fleet and soon became a threat to the Sultanate's forces. Even though Tamjidillah I had sent a number of expeditions to crush them, even working with the VOC, the pirates had become increasingly strong, so that they were able to ward off their expeditions. On August 1, 1759, Muhammad saw an opportunity to seize the throne from Tamjidillah I, and immediately commanded his pirate fleet to enter the Barito River, follow the Martapura River and besiege the capital Kayu Tangi. Tamjidillah I and the Sultanate family were surprised by this sudden siege, and ordered troops to confront the pirates, but the pirates easily crushed the opposing troops. A major battle occurred within the city on 2 August, but the Sultanate's forces were later defeated and Tamjidillah I declared his surrender.

On August 3, Muhammad entered the city accompanied by his pirate fleet crew, while Sultan Tamjidillah I was waiting for them in his palace with the dignitaries and the Sultanate Family. Tamjidillah I agreed to step down from his position, under the pretext of avoiding bloodshed between the families, especially since Muhammad was his own son-in-law. The ceremony of the transfer of the throne was held calmly, marking the beginning of Sultan Muhammad's reign.

=== Titles ===
The title recorded in ancient Banjar texts during his reign is "Muhammad Aliuddin Aminullah" (محمد علي الدين امين الله). According to Yusni Antemas (1971:54), Sultan Muhammad had the title "Tahmidullah I", while Prince Nata had the title Sultan "Tahmidullah II". In the book Sabilal Muhtadin, Sultan Muhammad has the title "Tamhidullah" (تمهيد الله).

In early Dutch sources, Sultan Muhammad is also referred to as "Tamdjidillah II", possibly because he was the successor of Tamjidillah I, while his successor, Prince Nata was called "Tamjidillah III". This naming is incorrect because neither Muhammad nor Prince Nata ever used the title "Tamjidillah" during their reign.

=== Relations with the VOC ===
Although he continued to accept trade relations with the VOC, Sultan Muhammad was more assertive towards the VOC compared to other foreign traders. Perhaps because he had a bad experience regarding the agreement at Fort Tatas, Sultan Muhammad became distrustful of the VOC. During his reign, the VOC was very careful because the Banjar people paid close attention to Sultan Muhammad's attitude towards foreign traders, and when they saw the Sultan being harsh, they also became more cynical towards Western traders affiliated with the VOC. This is evidenced by the report of one of the Western traders to the Resident de Lile at that time,

Residen jangan mengira bahwa di Banjar ini sama halnya dengan di Banten atau Jawa. Orang Banten atau Orang Jawa walaupun dia dipukul kompeni dengan cambuk di kepalanya, sekali-kali tak berani mengatakan bahwa pukulan itu sakit, tapi orang Banjar mendengar kata-kata yang keras saja sudah marah dan bila sampai terjadi begitu maka seluruh Banjar akan merupakan buah-buahan yang banyak pada satu tangkai.
Resident should not equate Banjar people with Bantenese or Javanese people. A Bantenese or Javanese person, if the Company hit him on the head, would not dare say that the blow hurt. However, even just by hearing a loud tone of voice, the Banjar people will become angry, and when they are angry, they will be like fruit gathered on one stalk.

Around June 17, 1760, Sultan Muhammad severed his ties with the VOC and completely opposed VOC influence in Banjar. This is as recorded by the National Archives of Indonesia.

== Death ==
Muhammad died on January 16, 1761, after reigning for only approximately one year and one hundred and sixty-six days. The cause of his death is still mysterious, the most famous conspiracy theory is that he was poisoned by Tamjidillah I's supporters, or even on Tamjidillah I's own orders to further his throne ambitions. This theory is based on reports that when Muhammad's convoy and his pirate fleet entered Kayu Tangi, a noble asked Tamjidiilah I why he was willing to surrender, to which Tamjidillah I is said to have replied, "Let the throne be seized by Ratu Anom, anyway he will die soon anyway." This remark was seen as Tamjidillah I's cunning intention to get rid of Sultan Muhammad.

Some literature mistakenly writes that Sultan Muhammad's death occurred in 1780, even though Sultan Muhammad had died before the death of his heir, Prince Abdullah, on March 17, 1776 due to poisoning.

== Family ==
Sultan Muhammad is the son of Sultan Hamidullah. According to the manuscript Tutur Candi, Muhammad's first wife was the daughter of Sultan Tamjidillah I, who was married for political reasons, she was titled as "Queen Muhammad", whose real name is unknown. While his second wife was a sister of Arung Turawe, who was the Bugis King in Paser. Thus, he was also the brother-in-law of Sultan Tahmidullah II, although in a number of Dutch sources Muhammad is mistakenly referred to as the half-brother of Sultan Tahmidullah II, also one of the sons of Tamjidillah I.

From his two wives, Sultan Muhammad had a number of children, four sons and three daughters:

1. Princess Lawiyah
2. Prince Abdullah, ia married to Queen Siti Air Mas, son of Tahmidullah II. He was the permanent heir of Sultan Muhammad. Prince Abdullah died of poisoning on the orders of his own father-in-law on March 17, 1776.
3. Prince Tumenggung, his real name is uncertain: some sources give his real name as Muhammad or Rahmad, while others give it as Achmad. He was killed in the mountains of Pelaihari also on the orders of Tahmidullah II.
4. Prince Amir, grandfather of later Prince Antasari, who would later rebel against Tahmidullah II, but his rebellion failed and he was captured and exiled to Sri Lanka.
5. Princess Rabiah
6. Prince Kusin

== Legacy ==
=== Succession dispute ===
Sultan Muhammad Aliuddin Aminullah is the 10th generation if counted from Sultan Surianshah as the 1st generation, his lineage is called Tutus Tuha dynasty. Meanwhile, the lineage of the sultanate family from Tamjidillah I is called Tutus Anum dynasty.

For years after Muhammad's death, Tamjidillah I and his son, Tahmidullah II attempted to assert the legitimacy of the Tutus Anum line as rulers of Banjar. In 1776, Tahmidullah II poisoned Crown Prince Abdullah, Muhammad's son and his own son-in-law. Some time later, another son of Muhammad, Prince Tumenggung, was killed in the mountainous region in what is now Tanah Laut. Muhammad's third son, Prince Amir, realizing what had happened to his brothers and that he was next, asked Tahmidullah II for permission to perform the hajj to Mecca. After the Sultan gave permission, Prince Amir instead diverted his ship to Paser, where he colluded with the Buginese King there to help him seize the throne from his uncle. Unfortunately, this rebellion failed and Prince Amir was exiled to Sri Lanka.

Tensions between the Tutus Tuha and Tutus Anum dynasties continued throughout the reign of Tahmidullah II. These tensions began to ease after Sultan Sulaiman, the heir of Tahmidullah II, decided to marry off several of his daughters to members of the Tutus Tuha dynasty. In this way, Sulaiman slowly reunited Tutus Tuha and Tutus Anum into one dynasty.

=== Removed from the Sultan list ===
After the death of Sultan Muhammad, the Tutus Anum dynasty, especially during the reigns of Tamjidillah I and Tahmidullah II, had repeatedly attempted to remove the names of Sultan Muhammad and Hamidullah from the list of Banjar Sultans. Notulen van de Algemeene en Directie-vergaderingen van het Bataviaasch Genootschap van Kunsten en Wetenschappen (1864:315) states:

Original
„De 8ste sulthan van Bandjermasin, Tahhmid Illah I‚ liet bij zijn overlijden twee zonen na, de oudste genaamd sulthan Hhamid Illah of sulthan Koening, en de jongste genaamd pangeran Sepah. Hhamid Illah werd bij het overlijden zijns vaders sulthan, doch regeerde slechts zeer korten tijd en liet eenen minderjarigen zoon na, genaamd sulthan Mohamad Amin Ollah.

„Gedurende de minderjarigheid van dezen laatste werd pangeran Sepah waarnemend sulthan, onder den naam van sulthan Tamdjid Illah I.

„Sulthan Mohamad Amin Ollah, meerderjarig geworden zijnde, nam zelf de teugels van het bewind in handen en Tamdjid Illah trad als waarnemend sulthan af; het volk bleef hem echter steeds sulthan Sepah of den ouden sulthan noemen.

„Nadat sulthan Mohamad Amin Ollah 7 jaren over Bandjerrnasin geregeerd had, stierf ook hij, drie zonen achterlatende (pangeran Rahhmat, pangeran Abdoellah en pangeran Amir), waarvan de oudste nog te jeugdig was om zelf te regeren.

„Tamdjid- Illah I trad toen wederom als waarnemend sulthan op, en nadat de beide pangerans Rahhmat en Abdoellah op zijnen last vergiftigd en geworgd waren, verhief hij zich tot werkelijk sulthan, zijnde inmiddels pangeran Amir gevlugt, en later door kracht van wapenen, en met behulp der O. I.compagnie gevangen genomen en naar Ceylon verbannen.

„Ofschoon Hhamid Illah en Mohamad Amin Ollah (hiervoren genoemd), de wettige troonsopvolgers, eenigen tijd over Bandjermasin hebben geregeerd, werden zij echter nimmer in de rij der vorsten opgenomen, en Tamdjid Illah I dus als de 9de sulthan van Bandjermasin besehouwd.

„Na zijnen dood in 1175 volgde zijn zoon Tahhmid lllah II hem als 10de sulthan op.

English translation
„The 8th sulthan of Bandjermasin, Tahhmid Illah I, left two sons at his death, the eldest named sulthan Hhamid Illah or sulthan Koening, and the youngest named pangeran Sepah. Hhamid Illah became sulthan at the death of his father, but reigned only for a very short time and left behind a minor son, named sulthan Mohamad Amin Ollah.

„During the latter's minority, Pangeran Sepah became acting sulthan, under the name of sulthan Tamdjid Illah I.

„Sultan Mohamad Amin Ollah, having come of age, took the reins of government in his own hands and Tamdjid Illah resigned as acting sulthan; however, the people continued to refer to him as sulthan Sepah or the old sulthan.

„After Sultan Mohamad Amin Ollah had ruled Bandjerrnasin for 7 years, he also died, leaving behind three sons (pangeran Rahhmat, pangeran Abdoellah and pangeran Amir), the eldest of whom was too young to rule himself.

„Tamdjid-Illah I then again acted as acting sulthan, and after the two pangerans Rahhmat and Abdoellah had been poisoned and strangled on his orders, he elevated himself to actual sulthan, pangeran Amir having fled in the meantime, and later by force of arms and with the help of the East Indian Company being captured and banished to Ceylon.

„Although Hhamid Illah and Mohamad Amin Ollah (mentioned above), the legitimate successors to the throne, ruled Bandjermasin for some time, they were never included in the line of princes, and Tamdjid Illah I was therefore regarded as the 9th Sultan of Bandjermasin.

„After his death in 1175, his son Tahhmid lllah II succeeded him as the 10th Sultan.

Muhammad of Banjar House of Banjarmasin Born: 1730 Died: 1761
Preceded by Tamjidillah I of Banjar	Sultan of Banjar; 1759 – 1761	Succeeded by Tahmidullah II of Banjar
Political offices
Preceded by Prince Hamidullah	Crown Prince; 1730 – 1759	Succeeded by Prince Abdullah
