= Panembahan Kusuma Dilaga =

Panembahan Kusuma Dilaga ڤانمبهان كوسوم دلاڬ

Sultan of Banjar
- Reign: 1717–1730
- Predecessor: Tahmidullah I
- Successor: Hamidullah
- Born: Pangeran Suria Dilaga; Sultanate of Banjar
- Died: c. 1730
- House: House of Banjarmasin
- Father: Tahlilullah
- Religion: Sunni Islam

Panembahan Kusuma Dilaga, born Pangeran Suria Dilaga, was a regent of the Sultanate of Banjar who ruled from 1717 to 1730. He was a son of Sultan Tahlilullah (also known as Sultan Amrullah Bagus Kasuma). He is one of the most obscure rulers in Banjar history, with few records surviving regarding his reign and life.

== Reign ==
Panembahan Kusuma Dilaga assumed power following the death of Sultan Tahmidullah I in 1717. His title of Panembahan rather than Sultan suggests he may have served as a regent rather than as a fully enthroned monarch.

According to records from the Arsip Nasional Republik Indonesia (National Archives of the Republic of Indonesia), diplomatic correspondence between Panembahan Kusuma Dilaga and the Dutch East India Company (VOC) occurred between 3 December 1720 and 21 February 1730. This correspondence would have primarily concerned the pepper trade, which was the main commodity of commerce between the Banjar Sultanate and European traders during this period.

During the early 18th century, the Banjar Sultanate maintained trade relations with the VOC, having previously restored commercial ties in 1708 under Sultan Tahmidullah I when Lim Kim Ko, a Chinese captain from Banjar, visited Batavia as a trade envoy.

Upon his death around 1730, he was succeeded by Sultan Hamidullah (also known as Sultan Kuning), a son of Tahmidullah I.

== See also ==
- Sultanate of Banjar
- List of rulers of Banjar
