= Hidayatullah II of Banjar =

Hidayatullah II هداية الله ٢
- Seri Sultan
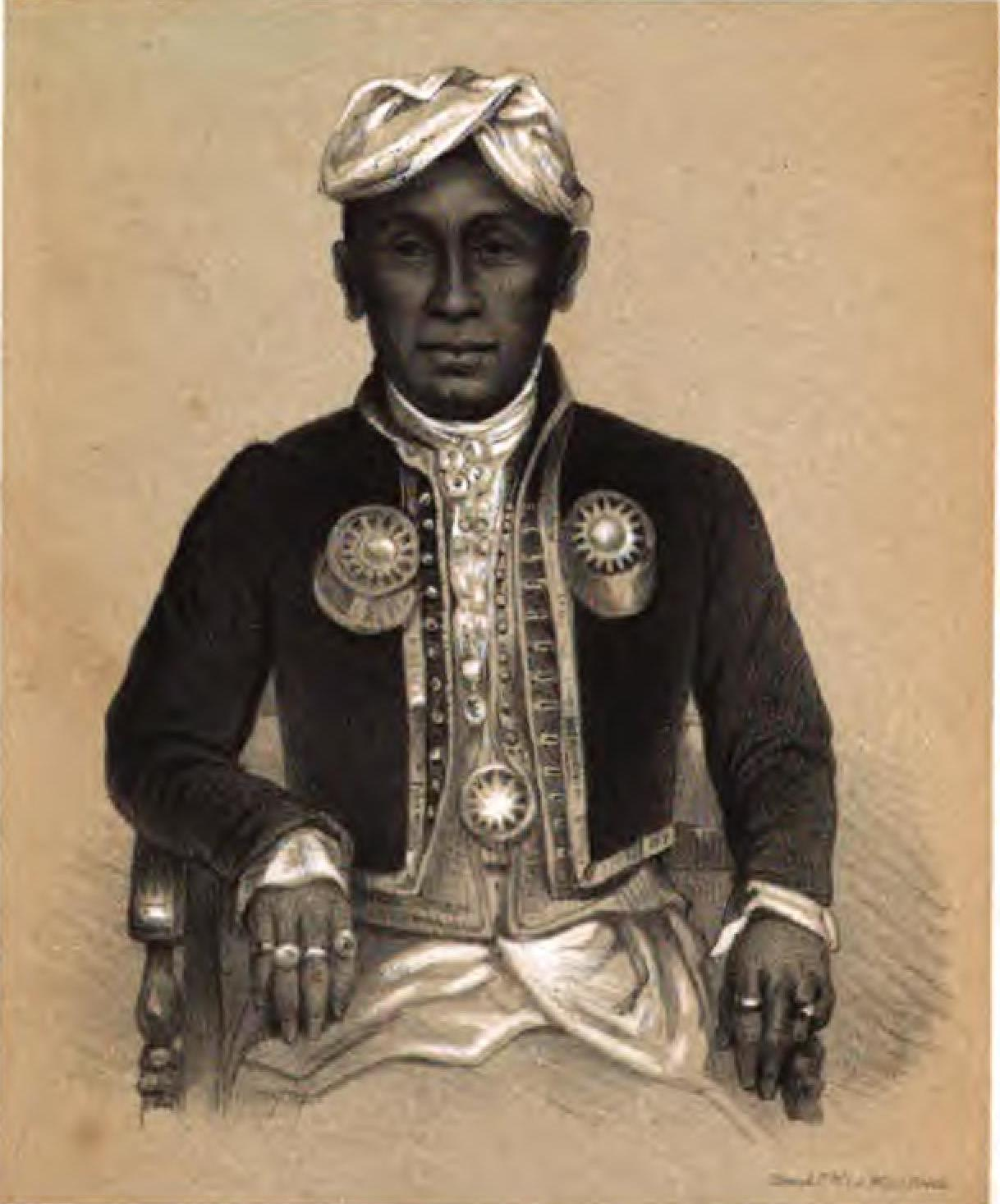
- Hidayatullah II painting, 1865.

Sultan of Banjar
- Reign: September 1859 – 2 March 1862
- Predecessor: Tamjidillah II
- Successor: Prince Antasari

Mangkubhumi of Banjar
- Reign: 9 Oktober 1856 – 5 Februari 1860
- Predecessor: Prince Tamjidillah
- Successor: Prince Wirakasuma
- Born: Gusti Andarun; 1822; Martapura, Sultanate of Banjar
- Died: 24 November 1904 (aged 81–82); Cianjur, Parahyangan, Dutch East Indies
- Spouses: Queen Consort Mas Bandara; Queen Mas Ratna Kediri; Queen Siti Aer Mas; Nyai Arpiah; Nyai Rahamah; Nyai Umpay; Nyai Putih; Nyai Jamedah; Nyai Ampit; Nyai Semarang; Nyai Noerain; Nyai Ratoe Etjeuh
- Issue: Prince Sasra Kasuma; Prince Abdul Rahman; Prince Muhammad Saleh; Princess Bulan; Princess Bintang; Princess Salamah; Ratu Saleh; Queen Sari Banun; Princess Ratna Wandari; Prince Amrullah; Prince Muhammad Alibasah
Regnal name
- توان كبوه دولي يڠ مها مليا ڤدوك سري سلطان هداية الله حلليل الله بن ڤڠيرن راتو سلطان مودا عبد الرحمن; Tuan Kebawah Duli Yang Maha Mulia Paduka Seri Sultan Hidayatullah Halilullah bin Pangeran Ratu Sultan Muda Abdurrahman
- House: House of Banjarmasin
- Father: Crown Prince Abdur Rahman
- Mother: Princess Siti Mariama
- Religion: Sunni Islam

Hidayatullah II (1822 – 24 November 1904) was the Sultan of Banjar who ruled between 1859 and 1862 and the main figure who led the opposition faction in the Banjarmasin War, a conflict between the Sultanate of Banjar and the Dutch East Indies which began with a struggle for the throne of the sultanate.

Born as the son of Crown Prince Abdur Rahman, Gusti Andarun was the prime candidate for heir to the throne of the Banjar Sultanate to succeed his grandfather, Adam of Banjar. However, the position was instead filled by his half-brother Tamjidullah II who received support from the Dutch East Indies government. This incident caused conflict within the sultanate family, where there was a camp supporting Tamjidullah who was close to the Dutch and a camp supporting Gusti Andarun who did not agree with the decision of the Dutch East Indies government. To reduce the tension, in 1856 the Dutch East Indies government appointed Gusti Andarun as mangkubhumi with the title Prince Hidayatullah.

However, this could not ease the tension between the noble families, the people, and the Dutch East Indies government. This tension also became the trigger for the start of the Banjarmasin War, where on April 18, 1859, Banjar troops led by Prince Antasari attacked the Oranje Nassau Coal Mine in Pengaron (now the north-central part of Banjar Regency). The colonial government then impeached Tamjidillah II and tried to crown Hidayatullah as sultan, but Hidayatullah refused the offer. He himself was crowned by the Banjar commanders as sultan in September 1859.

He led the Banjar War until 1862, when he and his family were captured by the Dutch East Indies. Sultan Hidayatullah II and his family and some of his followers were then exiled to Cianjur, where he spent the rest of his life until his death in 1904. For his anti-imperialist stance and his leadership in fighting the Dutch East Indies government in the Banjar War, in 1999 the government of the Republic of Indonesia awarded him the Bintang Mahaputera Utama.

== Personal life ==
Pangeran Hidayatullah was born in 1822 in Martapura. His father was Sultan Muda Abdurrahman son of Sultan Adam Al-Watsiq Billah, and his mother was Ratu Siti binti Pangeran Mangku Bumi Nata bin Sultan Sulaiman.

In 1852 the Sultan's heir-apparent died, and the Dutch replaced him by the illegitimate grandson Tamjied Illah. In vain, Sultan Adam and many nobles in 1853 sent an embassy to Batavia, pointing out iniquities perpetrated by the Dutch-designated heir and appealing for the Dutch to recognise instead Hidayatullah - a younger but legitimate son. Sultan Adam died in 1857 and was succeeded by Tamjied Illah. There ensued a struggle for power between Tamjied Illah and Hidayatullah, which divided the population, much of which stood behind Hidayatullah and highly resented the Dutch sponsoring of Tamjied Illah. In early 1859, a revolt against Tamjied's rule broke out and the Royal Netherlands East Indies Army intervened on his behalf, but in June 1859 Tamjied stepped down. Unable to find a suitable successor, the Dutch colonial government decided to annex the Sultanate of Banjar in June 1860. In early 1862, Hidayat surrendered to Dutch commander Verspijck in exchange for permission to settle on the island of Java. The last rebels surrendered in 1863.

Hidayat died in Cianjur, Jawa Barat, 24 November 1904.

== Sources ==
- 1936. Dr. J. Eisenberger. Kroniek der Zuider -en Oosterafdeling van Borneo. Liem Hwat Sing, Bandjermasin.
- 1892. Egbert Broer Kielstra. De ondergang van het Bandjermasinse Rijk. Overdruk uit de Indische Gids, jaargang 1891. E.J. Brill. Leiden.
- 1859. Wolter Robert van Hoëvell. De expeditie tegen Boni en de ramoen van Bandjermasin. Tijdschrift voor Nederlands Indie. 21 ste jaargang
- 1886. H.G.J.L. Meyners Bijdragen tot de geschiedenis van het Bandjermasinsche Rijk. 1863-1866. E.J. Brill. Leiden
- 1865. Willem Adriaan van Rees. De Bandjermasinse Krijg. 1859-1863. Twee delen. D.A. Thieme. Arnhem.
- 1867. W.A. van Rees. De Bandjermasinsche Krijg van 1859-1863 nader toegelicht. D.A. Thieme. Arnhem.
- 1897. J.P. Schoemaker. Verhalen uit de grote en kleine oorlog in Nederlands Indië. W.P. van Stockum & Zoon. Den Haag.
- 1865. Van Rees WA. De Bandjarmasinsche Krijg van 1859-1863, Arnhem: Thieme.
- 1989. Pangeran Shuria Rum. Riwayat Perjuangan Pangeran Hidayatullah. Martapura.
