= Hamidullah of Banjar =

Hamidullah حامد الله
- Sultan Kuning

Sultan of Banjar
- Reign: 1730 – 1734
- Predecessor: Panembahan Kusuma Dilaga
- Successor: Tamjidillah I
- Issue: Prince Muhammad; Gusti Wiramanggala
- House: House of Tutus Tuha
- Father: Sultan Tahmidullah I
- Religion: Islam Sunni

Hamidullah, known as Sultan Kuning (lit. 'Yellow Sultan'), was the Sultan of Banjar who ruled between 1730 until his death in 1734. His government was known as the most stable government, there was no conflict or power struggle, there was no interference from foreign nations, so it can be said that the Banjar Sultanate experienced its golden age during the reign of Sultan Hamidullah.
