= Adam of Banjar =

Sultan of Banjar (1776–1857)

Adam آدم
- Sultan van Bandjermasin; Sultan al-Watsiq Billah; Panembahan Adam; Raja Muda
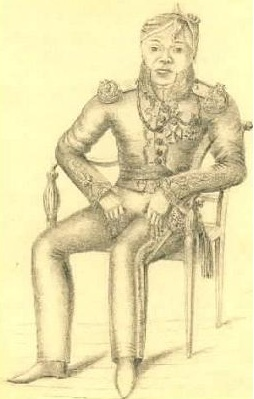
- Painting of Sultan Adam in 1844

Sultan of Banjar
- Reign: 3 June 1825 – 1 November 1857
- Predecessor: Sulaiman
- Successor: Tamjidillah II
- Born: 1776; Tambak Anyar, East Martapura, Sultanate of Banjar
- Died: November 1, 1857 (aged 80–81); Martapura, Sultanate of Banjar
- Issue: Prince Abdur Rahman; Prince Ismael; Prince Noh; Ratu Aminah Sjarief Hoesin; Ratu Salamah Ratoe Sjarief Ali; Ratu Khadijah Kramat Sjarief Abdoellah Nata Kasoema; Prince Soeria Mataram; Prince Praboe Anom; Ratoe Djantra Kasoema; Prince Nasaroedin; Ratu Idjah Antasari
Regnal name
- كبوه دولي يڠ مها مليا سري ڤدوك سلطان آدم الواثق بالله; Kebawah Duli Yang Maha Mulia Seri Paduka Sultan Adam al-Wathiq Billah
- House: Banjarmasin dynasty
- Father: Sulaiman Saidullah II
- Mother: Nyai Ratna
- Religion: Sunni Islam

Adam (1776 – 1 November 1857), with the title al-Wathiq Billah, was the Sultan of Banjar who ruled from 1825 until his death in 1857, succeeding his father, Sulaiman of Banjar. During his reign, Banjar became a Dutch protectorate in accordance with the agreement between the Dutch and his grandfather, Tahmidullah II and his father, Sulaiman. After his death, a succession crisis began and led to the long Banjarmasin War and ultimately brought down the sultanate.

== Early life ==
Sultan Adam was born in 1776 in Karang Anyar village, Karang Intan, Banjar Regency, South Kalimantan, Indonesia.

Adam was the eldest son of Sultan Sulaiman's 23 other sons. He received the title of Sultan Muda since 1782. When Adam died on November 1, 1857, a succession crisis occurred.
