= Tamjidillah I of Banjar =

Tamjidillah I تمجيد الله ا
- Panembahan Kesuma Alam

Sultan of Banjar
- Reign: 1734-1759
- Coronation: 1734
- Predecessor: Hamidullah
- Successor: Muhammad
- Born: Pangeran Amarullah Bagus Kasuma
- Died: 1767
- Spouses: 1. Ratu Mas of Tanah Bumbu
- Issue: 1. ♂ Prince Isa; 2. ♂ Prince Mangku Dilaga; 3. ♂ Prince Nata Dilaga; 4. ♂ Prince Aria Mangku Negara; 5. ♂ Prince Berahim; 6. ♀ Putri Sara; 7. ♂ Prince Mangkubumi; 8. ♂ Prince Prabu jaya Praba jangga 9. ♂ Pangeran Thoha Pangeran Thaha; 10. ♂ Prince Suria; 11. ♂ Prince Ahmad; 12. ♀ Ratu Syarif
Names
- 1. Panembahan Badarul Alam
- House: House of Tutus Anum
- Father: Tahmidullah I of Banjar
- Religion: Sunni Islam

Tamjidillah I (???-1767), was the Sultan of Banjar who ruled between 1734-1759. He was the younger brother of Sultan Hamidullah who is also called the Sultan Kuning.
