= Sultanate of Banjar =

Sultanate based in South Kalimantan (1526–1860/1905), restored in 2010

Coordinates: 3.322°S 114.77378°E

Sultanate of Banjar كسلطانن بنجر Kasultanan Banjar
- 1520-1905
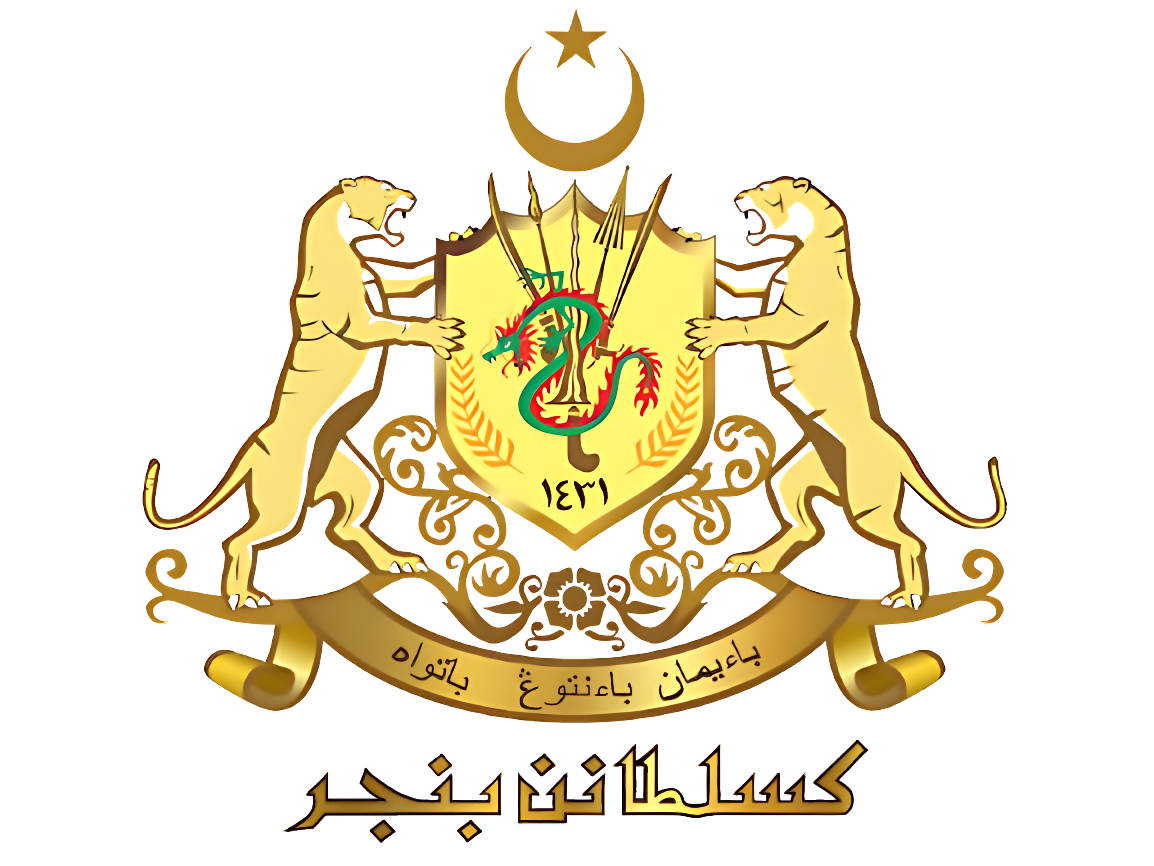
- Flag Coat of arms

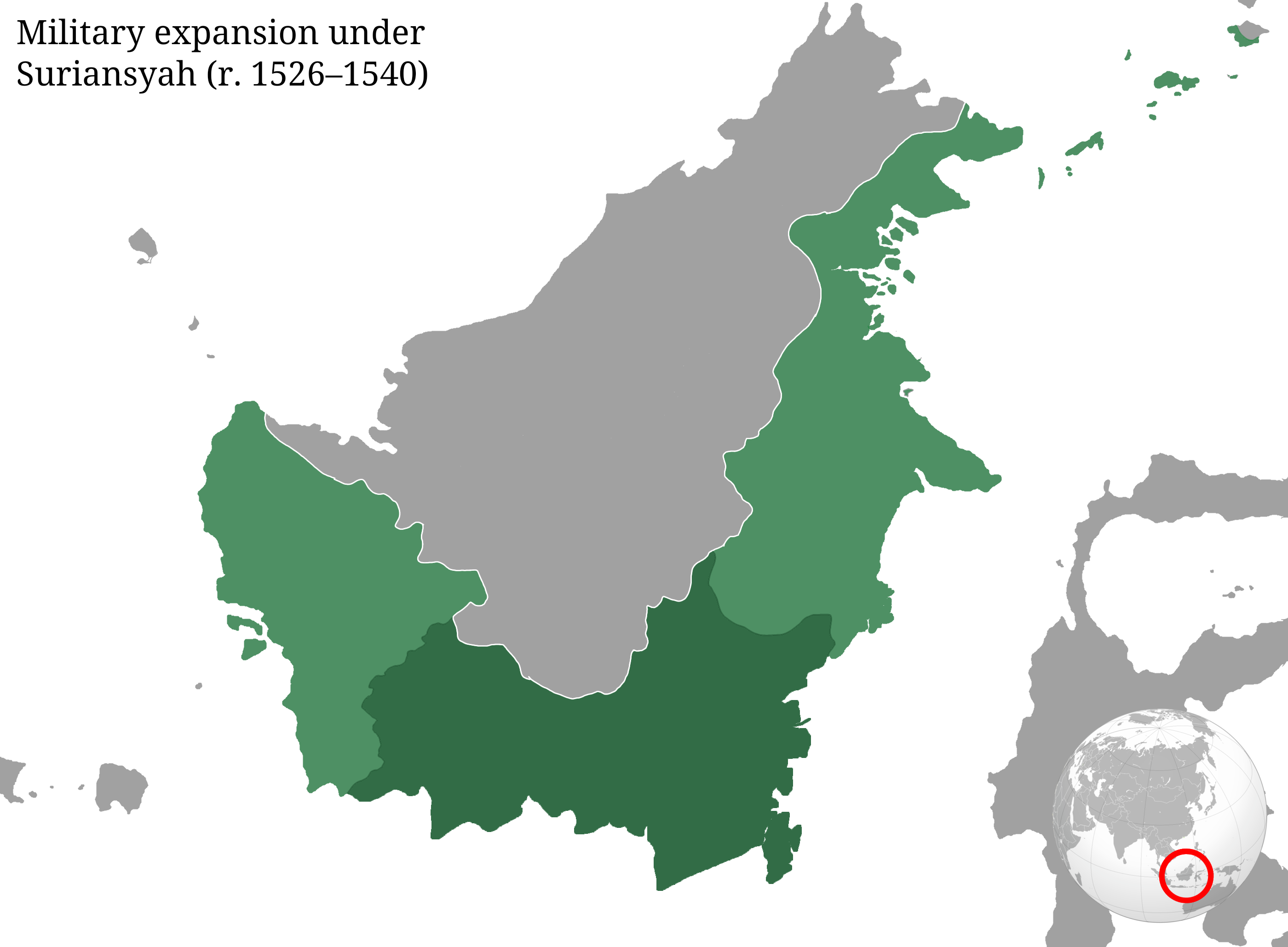
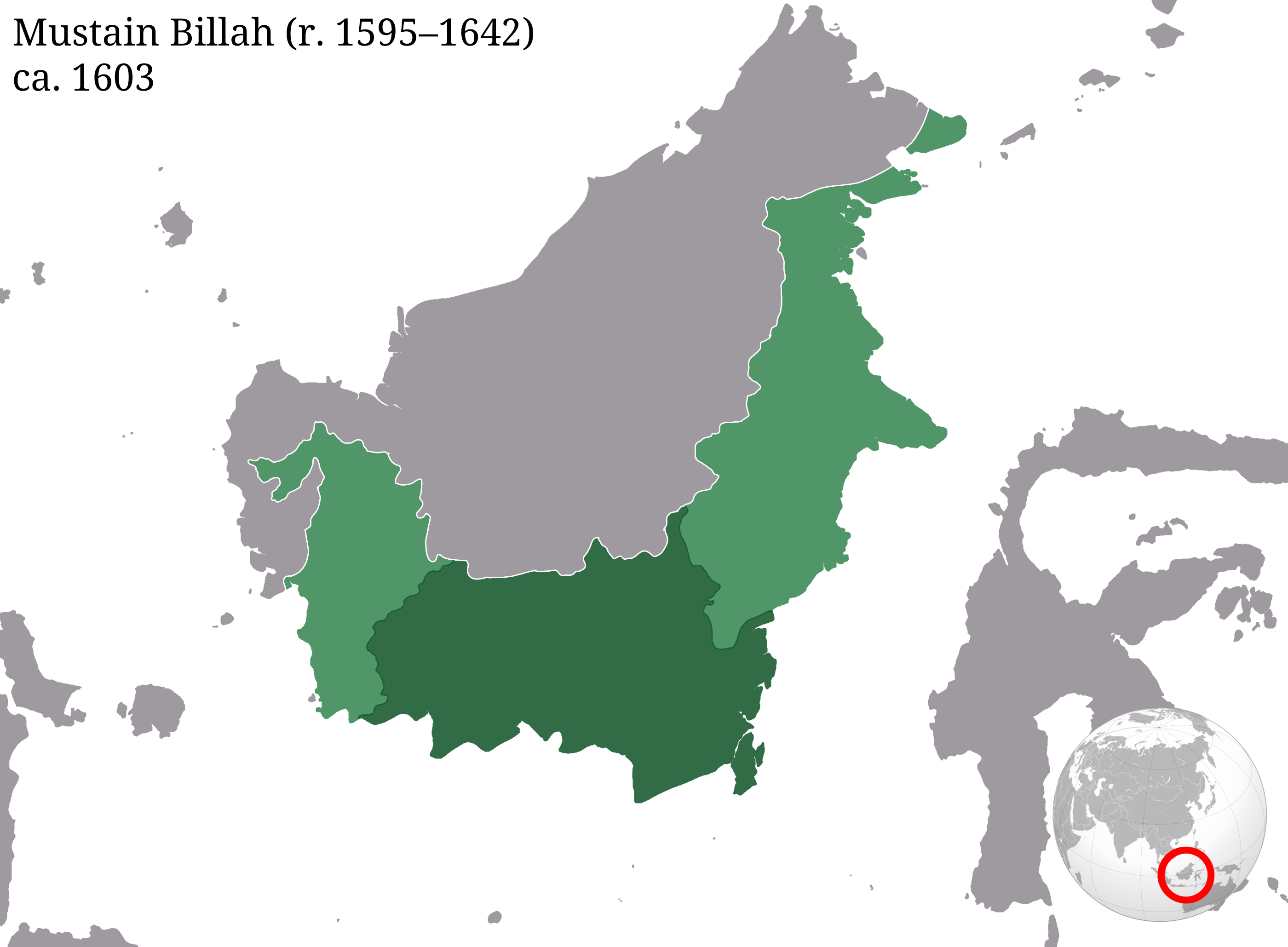
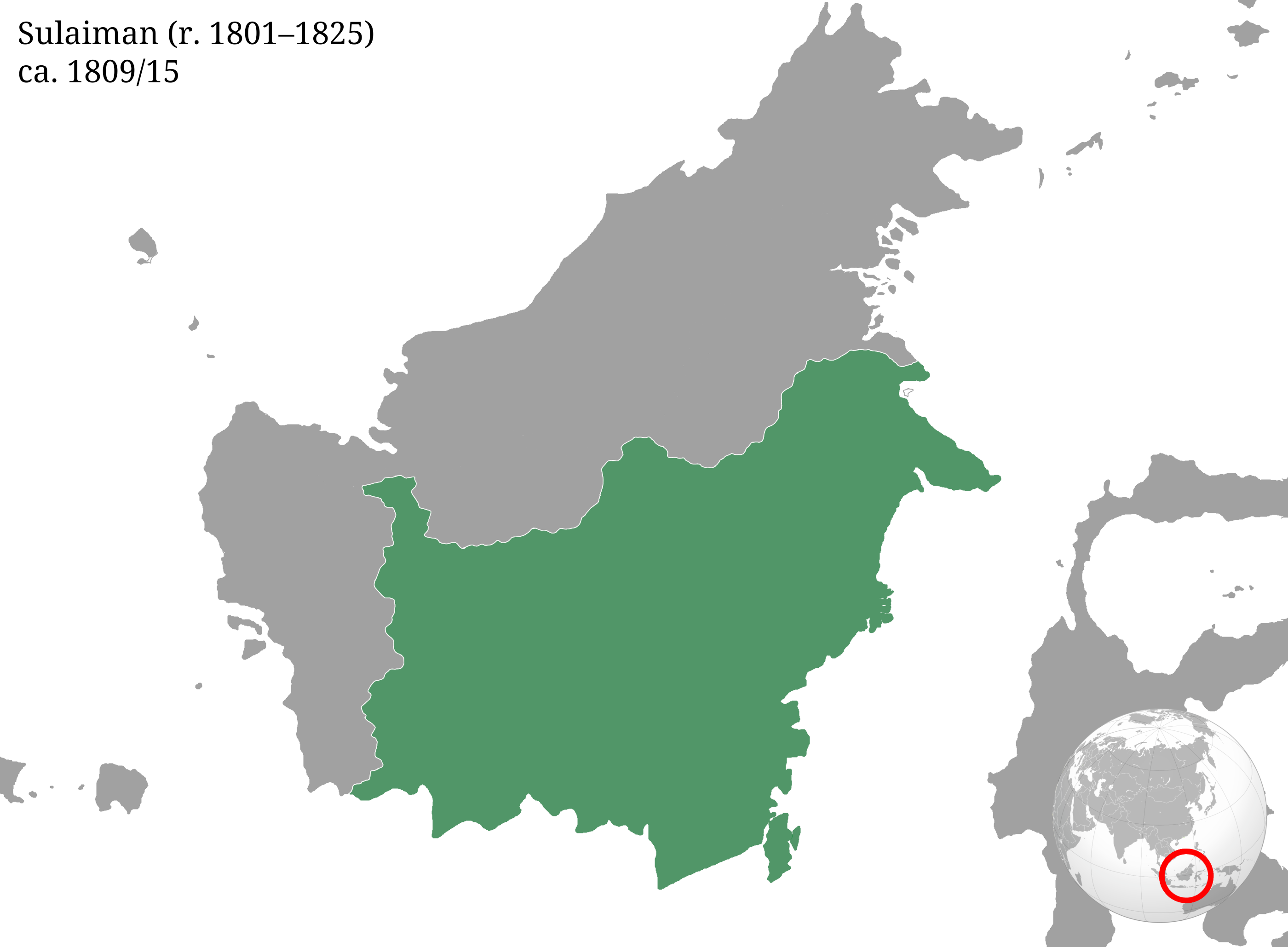
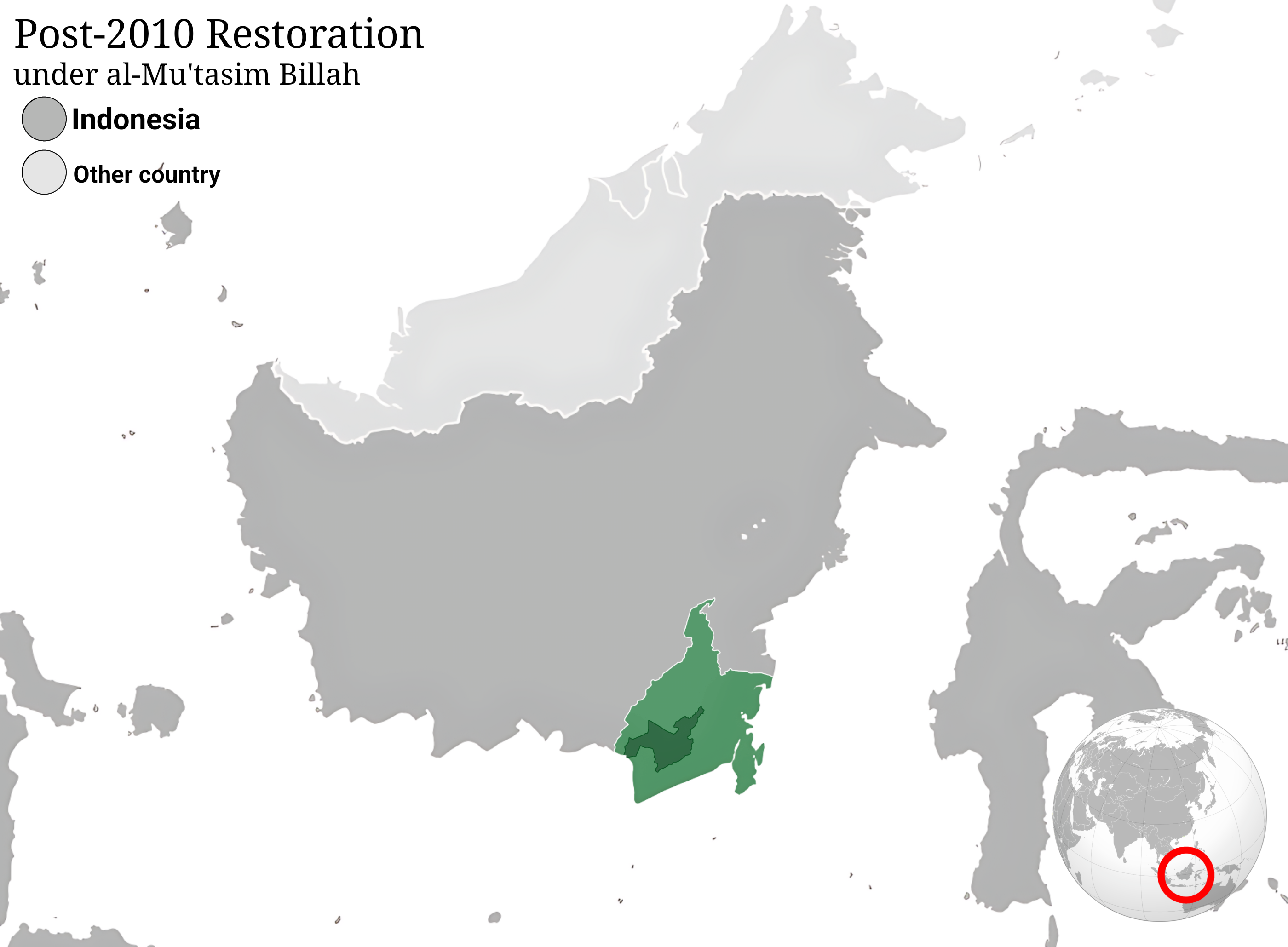
- Status: Tributary state of Demak Sultanate (1526–1548); Sovereign state (1548–1826), De facto 1859–1862); De jure Protectorate of the Dutch East Indies (1826–1960); Emergency government (1862–1905); Customary cultural institution under Indonesia (since 2010)
- Capital: Kuin (1520–1612); Pamakuan (1612–1622); Muara Tambangan (1622–1632); Batang Banyu (1632–1642); Old Martapura (1642–1663); Batang Alai (1663–1679); Banjarmasin (1663–1680); Kayu Tangi (1680–1771); Martapura (1771–1806) (Note: With the discovery of coal deposits in the area near Martapura, the Dutch East Indies government planned to take over Martapura and move the capital of the Banjar Sultanate to Kota Nagara, the former capital during the Negara Daha era.); Banjarmasin (1857–1860); Baras Kuning (1862–1905)
- Common languages: Banjar (official), Malay, Dayak languages (including Ngaju, Ot Danum, Ma'anyan, etc), Kutai.
- Religion: Sunni Islam (official); Kaharingan; Confucianism; Christianity
- Government: Monarchy; Sultanate based on mandala
- Maharaja-Sultan
  - 1520–1540: Surianshah/Raden Samudera (first)
  - 1862–1905: Muhammad Seman (last sovereign)
  - 2010–now: al-Mu'tasim Billah (restoration 2010)
- History
  - The Establishment of the Kingdom: 1520-1905
  - Transformed into a sultanate and inauguration Sultan Surianshah: 1526
  - Karang Intan agreement: 1826
  - Banjarmasin War: 1859–1906
  - Pagustian regency: 1862–1905
  - Annexation into the Dutch East Indies: 1905
  - Restoration: 2010
- Website kesultananbanjar.or.id
Preceded by	Succeeded by
Negara Daha	Dutch East Indies
- Today part of: Indonesia; Malaysia; Philippines

The Sultanate of Banjar (Banjar: كسلطانن بنجر, romanized: Kasultanan Banjar) was a nation-state of the Banjar in the form of an Islamic sultanate in Borneo which was founded as a Kingdom in 1520 and turned into a sultanate in 1526. This kingdom existed until its dissolution in 1860 by the colonial government of the Dutch East Indies and The fact is that the collapse really happened in the year 1905. The Banjar Sultanate was restored in the 2010 restoration, but without political power.

When the capital was in Kayu Tangi, the Sultanate was referred to as the "Kayu Tangi Kingdom". After a long civil war that destroyed the Negara Daha, Surianshah of Banjar/Raden Samudera (r. 1520–1540) emerged victorious and crowned himself as the first Sultan of Banjar, and founded the Banjar sultanate with its capital in Kuin. Soon after the stabilization of the new state, he ordered a massive expansion to Sambas and the Sulu Archipelago. The vast territory was maintained by his son, Rahmatullah of Banjar (r. 1540–1570).

Despite the loss of a number of territories, the reign of Mustain Billah of Banjar (r. 1595–1642) was the peak of Banjar's glory with the development of the pepper trade and Banjar's dominance over the surrounding seas, which became a strategic trading point from the Straits of Malacca and Brunei to Gowa and Maluku. At the end of his reign, Mustain Billah faced conflict with the Dutch East India Company (VOC) which culminated in a failed attack on Banjarmasin in 1633. This failed VOC attack strengthened Mustain Billah's position and the conflict continued during the reign of his son, Inayatullah of Banjar (r. 1642–1645). In the end, the Dutch agreed to sign a peace treaty during the reign of Rakyatullah of Banjar (r. 1660–1663).

From 1663 to 1679, there was a civil war between Sultan Agung of Banjar (r. 1663–1679) based in Banjarmasin and Tahlilullah of Banjar (r. 1663–1679; 1679–1708) based in Batang Alai. Dutch support for Tahlilullah and Tahlilullah's victory in the invasion of Banjar in 1679 gave the VOC more economic authority and slowly dominated Banjar. After extensive expansion and negotiations, Tamjidillah I of Banjar (r. 1734–1759) and his son-in-law, Muhammad of Banjar (r. 1759–1761) managed to recover most of the Banjar territory, the latter taking a tough stance against the Dutch. Tahmidullah II of Banjar (r. 1761–1801) succeeded in reducing the influence of the VOC in Banjar, although he again handed over many areas to the VOC, these areas were again controlled by Banjar during the time of Sulaiman of Banjar (r. 1801–1825). The Banjar Sultanate then became a Dutch protectorate during the reign of Adam of Banjar (r. 1825–1857), and the sultan's influence was suppressed.

The succession crisis of Adam of Banjar, and the unilateral appointment of Tamjidillah II of Banjar (r. 1857–1859) by the Dutch led to the outbreak of the Banjar War, in which opposition forces supporting Sultan Hidayatullah II of Banjar (r. 1859–1862) managed to win the succession battle. The Dutch, who did not accept this, dissolved the Sultanate in 1860 and exiled Hidayatullah II to Cianjur. Prince Antasari (r. 1862) was installed as Sultan of Banjar and led a brief resistance before dying of smallpox. Muhammad Seman (r. 1862–1905) led a government in exile in Puruk Cahu, known as Pagustian, before being killed in 1905, marking the collapse of the Banjar Sultanate. In 2010, the Banjar Sultanate was restored with the coronation of al-Mu'tasim Billah as Sultan of Banjar.

== History ==
The second king of Negara Daha, Maharaja Sukarama, had four commoner wives, and four sons and one daughter. As Maharaja Sukarama followed the traditional belief of Negara Dipa requiring the king to be of royal blood, he arranged the marriage of his sole daughter, Putri Galuh Baranakan, and the son of his brother, Raden Bagawan, with the name Raden Mantri. The goal of this union (of Mantri and Galuh) was to produce the ideal heir to rule Daha as they would have patrilineal and matrilineal royal blood. The union resulted in Raden Samudra, who was prepared by Sukarama to rule.

However, after Sukarama's death, this succession was challenged by his sons, Pangeran Mangkubumi and Pangeran Tumanggung, who usurped the throne. Raden Samudra escaped from the Kingdom of Daha to the Barito River area, because his safety was in danger, and established a new kingdom at Banjarmasin. With help from Mangkubumi Aria Taranggana, Raden Samudra converted to Islam on 24 September 1526, changing his name to Sultan Surianshah. Banjar at first paid tribute to the Sultanate of Demak. That state met its demise in the mid-16th century, however, and Banjar was not required to send tribute to the new power in Java, the Sultanate of Pajang.

Banjar rose in the first decades of the 17th century as a producer and trader of pepper. In the 16th to 17th century The Banjar Sultanate once conquered almost the entire island of Borneo, such as: The entire region of South Kalimantan, Dayak Besar The large area of Central Kalimantan, Kotawaringin, Sukadana, Sintang, Sanggau, Sekadau, Lawai, Landak, Sambas (southern and western regions), Paser, Kutai, Berau, Tawau Division, And Sulu Archipelago (eastern and northern regions). All conquered territories had to pay tribute to the Banjar Sultanate. were paying tribute to the sultanate. Sultan Agung of Mataram (1613–1646), who ruled north Java coastal ports such as Jepara, Gresik, Tuban, Madura and Surabaya, planned to colonise the Banjar-dominated areas of Kalimantan in 1622, but the plan was cancelled because of inadequate resources.

In the 18th century, Prince Tamjidullah I successfully transferred power to his dynasty and set Prince Nata Dilaga as its first sultan with Panembahan Kaharudin Khalilullah. Nata Dilaga became the first king of the dynasty as Tamjidullah I in 1772, on the day of his accession calling himself Susuhunan Nata Alam.

The son of Sultan Muhammad Aliuddin Aminullah named Prince Amir, a grandson of Sultan Hamidullah, fled to the Pasir, and requested the help of his uncle Arung Tarawe (and Ratu Dewi). Amir then returned and attacked the Sultanate of Banjar with a large force of Bugis people in 1757, and tried to retake the throne of Susuhunan Nata Alam. Fearing the loss of his throne and the fall of the kingdom to the Bugis, Susuhunan Nata Alam requested the assistance of the Dutch East India Company (VOC), who dispatched a force under Captain Hoffman. The combined force defeated the Bugis, sending Amir to flee back to Pasir. After a long time, he tried to meet with Barito Banjar nobles, who disliked the VOC. Following this, Amir was arrested and exiled to Sri Lanka in 1787, and Banjar became a Dutch protectorate.

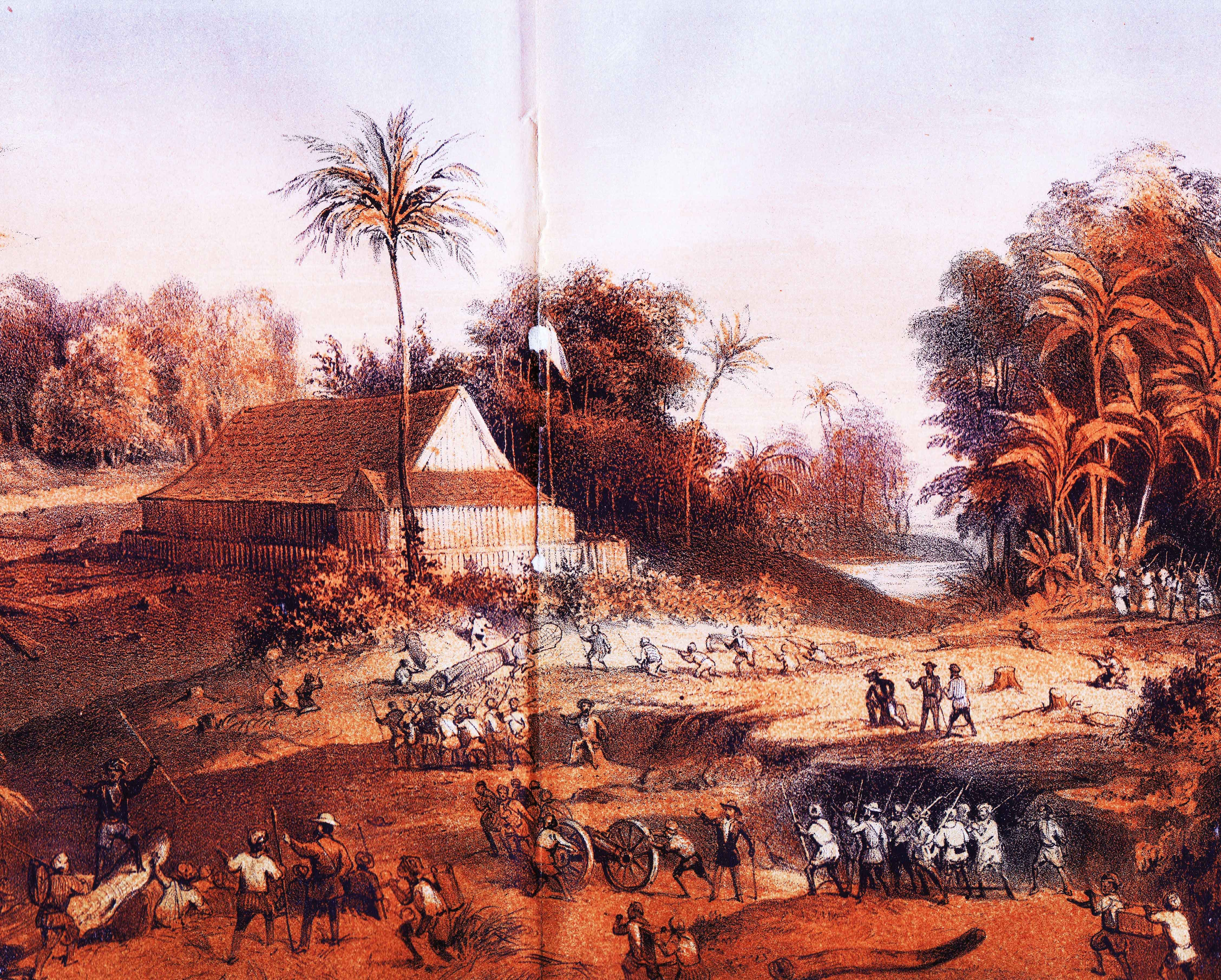
Banjarmasin War

The Dutch increased their presence in the 19th century, taking territory from the sultanate and interfering in the appointment of its rulers. Resistance led to the Banjarmasin War (1859–1905) and the abolition of the sultanate in 1860. Afterwards, the area was governed by regents in Martapura (Pangeran Jaya Pemenang) and in Amuntai (Raden Adipati Danu Raja). The regency was finally abolished in 1884. The last claimant to the throne died in 1905.

== Revival ==
As of 2010, the sultanate was revived for cultural purposes in Martapura by Ir. Haji Gusti Khairul Saleh, an Indonesian politician and regent of Banjar Regency who claimed to be a descendant of the royal family. He also planned to rebuild the Banjar royal palace using his own private fund.

== Family tree ==
Family Tree of Banjar Monarchs

Surianshah^{(1)} r. 1520–1540/6
Rahmatullah^{(2)} r. 1540/6-1570
Hidayatullah I^{(3)} r. 1570–1595
Musta'in Billah^{(4)} r. 1595–1636/42
Inayatullah^{(5)} r. 1636/1642-1645	Rakyatullah/ Ri'ayatullah^{(7)} r. 1660–1663
Sa'idullah^{(6)} r. 1645–1660	Sultan Agung^{(9)} r. 1663–1679
Tahlilullah^{(8)} r. 1660–1679, 1679–1700
Tahmidullah I^{(10)} r. 1700–1717	Kusuma Dilaga^{(11)} r. 1717–1730
Hamidullah^{(12)} r. 1730–1734	Tamjidillah I^{(13)} r. 1734–1759
Muhammad^{(14)} r. 1759–1761	Tahmidullah II^{(15)} r. 1761–1801
Prince; Amir	Sulaiman^{(16)} r. 1801–1825
Prince; Mas'ud	Adam^{(17)} r. 1825–1857	Prince; Singhasari
Antasari^{(20)} r. 1862	Crown Prince; Abdur Rahman	Prince; Abubakr
Muhammad; Seman^{(21)} r. 1862–1905	Tamjidillah II^{(18)} r. 1857–1859	Hidayatullah II^{(19)} r. 1859–1862	Prince; Omar
Prince; Jumri
al-Mu'tasim; Billah^{(22)} r. 2010–present

== See also ==
- Banjar people
