= Mangkubhumi =

Historically used term

Mangkubhumi (Javanese: ꦩꦁꦏꦸꦧ꧀ꦲꦸꦩꦶ; Sundanese: ᮙᮀᮊᮥᮘᮥᮙᮤ; Jawi: مڠكوبومي) is a term for prime minister which was historically used in kingdoms in Java, Sumatra and Borneo during Hindu–Buddhist civilizations in Nusantara. Elsewhere, Mangkubhumi is also referred to as Rijksbestuurder, Bendahara, Pepatih Dalem, Perdipati, Pabbicara Butta, Tuan Bicara, Rajabicara, and Tomarilaleng.

At first, the position of Mangkubhumi was given to lower-class people who were not nobles. However, over time the position of Mangkubumi was also held by the Majesty the King and Prince Dipati Anom (the King's brother or the second son of the reigning King), with the title "Prince of Mangkubhumi" and became the highest position under king.

== Etymology ==
The term mangkubhumi is a term found in Indonesian languages, for example in the manuscript Sanghyang Siksa Kandang Karesian which is in Old Sundanese, there is the following sentence fragment:

...wang tani bakti di wado, wado bakti di mantri, mantri bakti di nu nangganan, nu nangganan bakti di mangkubumi, mangkubumi bakti di ratu, ratu bakti di déwata, déwata bakti di hyang...

Translation:

...the farmers is devoted (submissive) to Wado, Wado is devoted to Mantri, Mantri is devoted to Nu Nangganan. Nu Nangganan is devoted to Mangkubumi, Mangkubumi is devoted to the King, the King is devoted to the devatas, the devatas are devoted to Hyang...

— Sanghyang Siksa Kandang Karesian (1518), II: 17--9

In the concept of state administration in the Kingdom of Sunda, apart from the level of prime minister, Mangkubumi can also mean harbor master. In carrying out his duties, Mangkubumi assisted the duties of the Prebu or King of the Sunda Kingdom, Mangkubumi was assisted by the Nu nangganan, Nu nangganan was assisted by the Mantri and the Mantri was assisted by the Wado who were in direct contact with the people. Mangkubhumi is also found in Javanese, and is referred to as Mahapatih Hamengkubumi often shortened to Mahapatih or simply Mangkubumi. In Banjarese, Mangkubhumi is referred to as Maharaja Mangkubumi.

== See also ==
- Wazir – A similar position parallel to Mangkubhumi.
- Hamengkubuwana I, which has another name "Mangkubumi".
- Gajah Mada, a famous Mahapatih Hamengkubumi of Majapahit.
- Princess Mangkubumi, heiress presumptive of Yogyakarta Sultanate.
