= Martapura, South Kalimantan =

City and Capital of Banjar Regency, South Kalimantan, Indonesia

Coordinates: 3°27′S 114°50′E

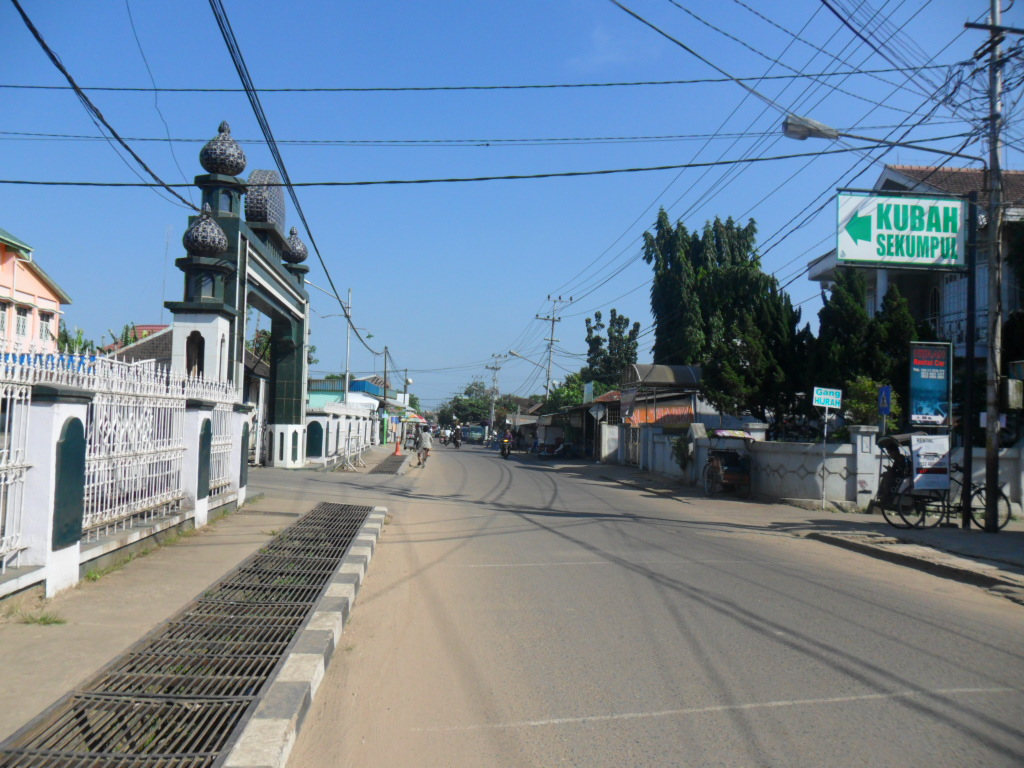
Martapura

Martapura is the capital of the Banjar Regency in South Kalimantan province, Indonesia. It is located immediately to the north of the city of Banjarbaru (with which it forms a continuous built-up area) and it consists of three districts within the Regency - Martapura, West Martapura and East Martapura, with a combined population at the 2020 Census of 169,356 people; the official estimate as at mid 2025 was 181,064.

Originally this town was named "Kayutangi", which was the last capital of the former Sultanate of Banjar. The famous Banjarese ulema Sheikh Muhammad Arsyad al-Banjari, author of Sabilal Muhtadin, comes from this town.

This town is famous as kota santri or the "city of santri (Muslim students)" in Kalimantan, because of the pesantren (Islamic boarding school) of Pondok Pesantren Darussalam Martapura. Martapura is often called "Veranda of Mecca" because there are many santris wearing white clothes in this town who walk up and down to study Islam, similar to Mecca in the hajj season.

This town is often visited by tourists because of its diamond industry center and the main diamond polishing in Kalimantan and provides many jewelry handicrafts.

== Administration ==
Martapura comprises three of the districts (kecamatan) of Banjar Regency, listed below with their areas and their populations at the 2010 Census and 2020 Census, together with the official estimates (for mid 2025).

Name	Area in km^{2}	Pop'n Census 2010	Pop'n Census 2020	Pop'n Estimate 2025	No. of villages (kelurahan)
Martapura	42.03	101,482	121,153	130,177	26
Martapura Timur (East Martapura)	29.99	29,200	29,370	31,113	20
Martapura Barat (West Martapura)	149.38	16,972	18,833	19,774	13
Totals	221.40	147,654	169,356	181,064	59
