= Warfare in post-Malacca Malay World =

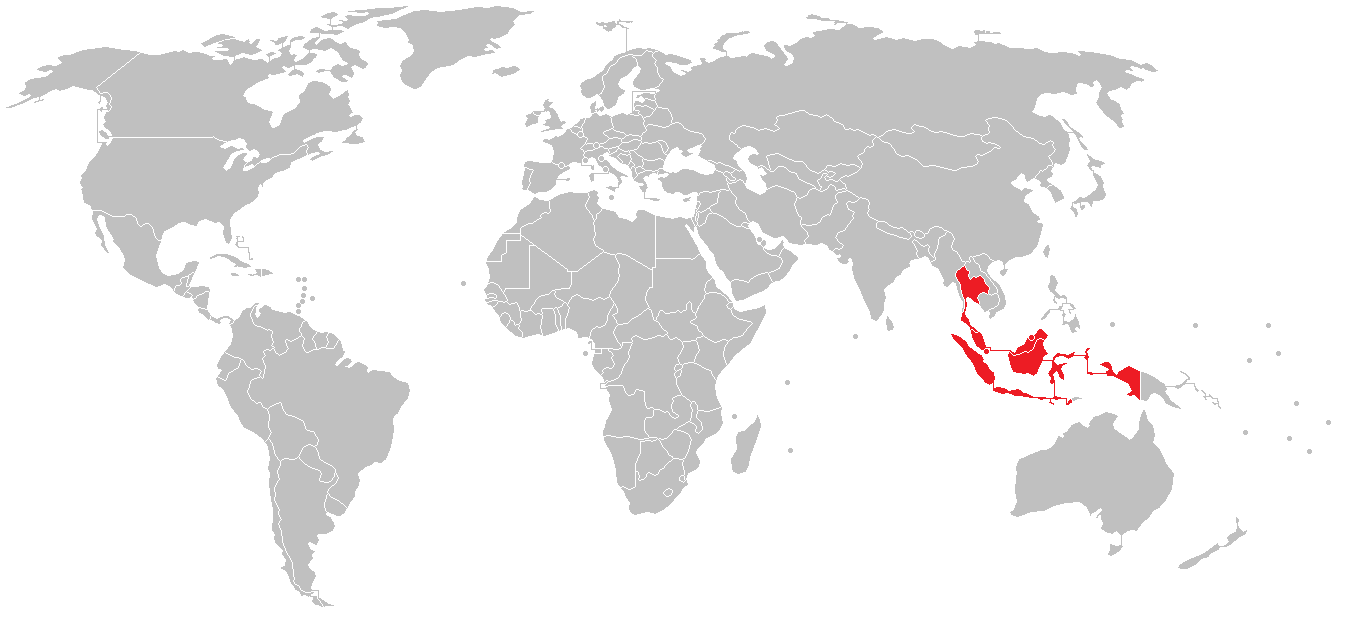
the Malay world

Warfare in post–Malacca Malay World generally called Malay warfare includes all forms of military activity in southern Thailand, Malaysia, Brunei, Singapore and Kalimantan and Sumatra between the Capture of Malacca to the Portuguese in the early sixteenth century and the military defeat of Haji Abdul Rahman Limbong's forces in the early twentieth century.

== Background ==
In the post-Malacca era, the Malays had their own forces, divided between the islands, each one with its own ruler. These forces were usually made up of ceteria (royal guards), hulubalang (knight), bentara (squire/herald/sergeant-at-arms) pendekar (skilled warriors), lasykar (foot sergeant), penjurit (mercenary), serah dan kerah (levies), slave soldiers, and sometimes war elephants or cavalry, depending on the region.

== Tactics and strategies ==
Many Malay armies used offensive attacks and sallies en masse. As noted by Manuel Godinho de Erédia:

The armed forces of the Malayos do not follow the ordered military tactics of Europe: they only make use of attacks and sallies in mass formation: their sole plan is to construct an ambush in the narrow paths and woods and thickets, and then make an attack with a body of armed men: whenever they draw themselves up for battle, they acquit themselves badly and usually suffer heavy losses.

— Manuel Godinho de Erédia

They also used wooden barricades and bushes as cover before charging into their opponents similar to the Janissaries of the Ottoman Empire though without the cover. With the cost of heavy casualties opposite of Iranun tactics during about the same time which avoided said amount of casualties.

== Military technology ==
Photograph of Malay firearms, armour and swords, showcased in the National Museum of Malaysia.

Post-Malaccan Malay armies used a mixture of armor, firearms, cannons and traditional weapons. Which were introduced initially by the Portuguese and Spanish before being reintroduced by the British and Dutch.

=== Traditional weapons ===
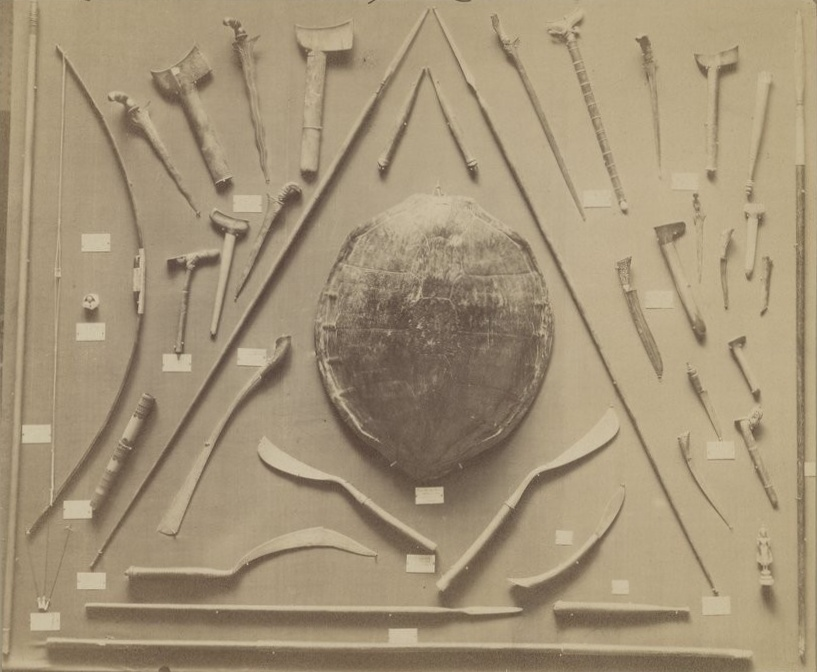
Malay weapons in the Malay peninsula.

Before the existence of the keris and the arrival of gunpowder they mainly used lembing spears. Though it is argued by historians whether or not the keris or spear came first.

In spite of popular imagery of small kerises, many Malay warriors used sundang or keris bahari most of the time as it had better range than the normal keris.

They also used rattan shields called a taming. This type of shield was suited to sword and spear combat in Malaysia and Indonesia. Malays used bows until at least until the 17th century when it was largely in warfare by musketry. They were described as larger than the bows of Persia by Manuel Godinho de Erédia.

=== Gunpowder weapons ===
==== Firearms ====
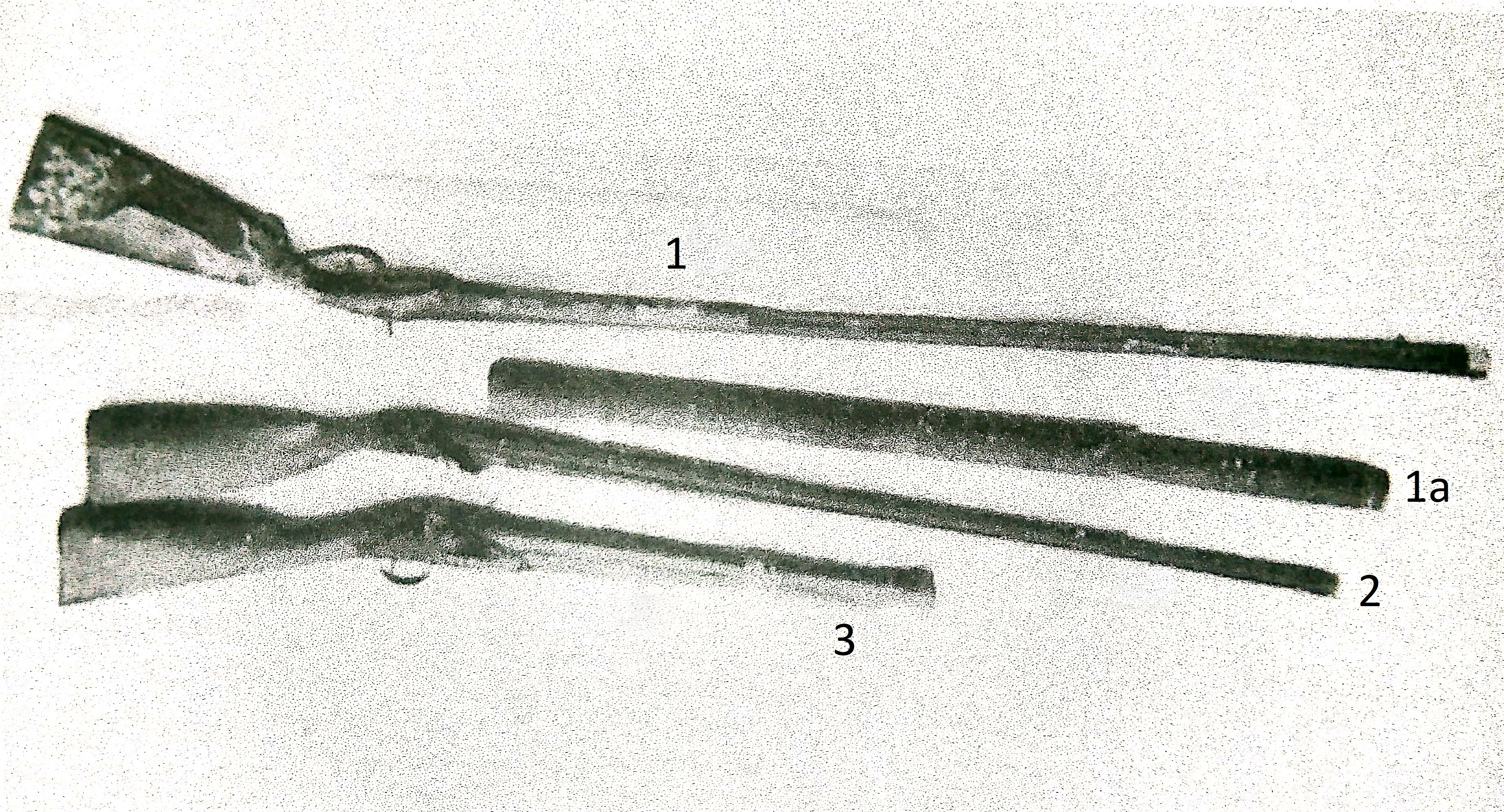
Photograph of Malay firearms: (1) Long ornamented flintlock gun (1a) Bamboo and rattan barrel cover. (2) Another flintlock gun. (3) Brass blunderbuss.

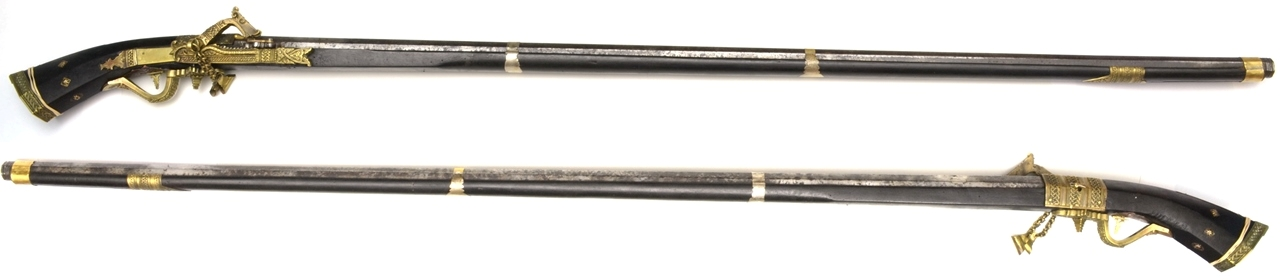
Malay istinggar, the first Malay gunpowder small arm in the 16th century.

After the Capture of Malacca by the Portuguese, the usage of muskets began to become common place in the Malay world especially during war time.

By the 16th century, the istinggar and the blunderbuss also known in the Malay world as pemuras became popular. Combined with traditional arms, they could be compared to the French army in the Siege of Orléans of 1428 to 1429. In 17th century the Dutch East India Company or the Bugis fleeing Sulawesi introduced the dragon, called the tarkoel or tarkul to the region.

Firearms with flintlock mechanisms would arrive from later in the same century, the Malays depended on European powers, as no local metalsmiths were capable of producing such complex components. Flintlock firearms were different weapons, also known as senapan or senapang, derived from the Dutch word snaphaan. In the gun-making regions of the Malay world, these senapan could be produced locally, with the barrel and wooden components crafted in the Malay world.

Bamboo and rattan barrel covering on top of their senapan were also exclusively used by Malays usually to keep them dry in wet weather. They would also be blessed by a alim to prevent for example, the gun from exploding on the operator's hand and to strengthen the gun.

In the late 19th century, European weaponry became increasingly popular amongst Malays to the point that the Martini-Henry was a "divine weapon" called the "Peteri Hernyn" sent by God through the Archangel Gabriel to the Prophet Muhammad with an silsila (spiritual lineage) tracing back to Muhammad and other prominent Sufis such as Abdul Qadir Jilani. (Note: It should noted not all Sufis believed in this, only a fringe group of Sufis believe in this and is seen as heretical belief and falls under bi'dah.)

==== Artillery ====
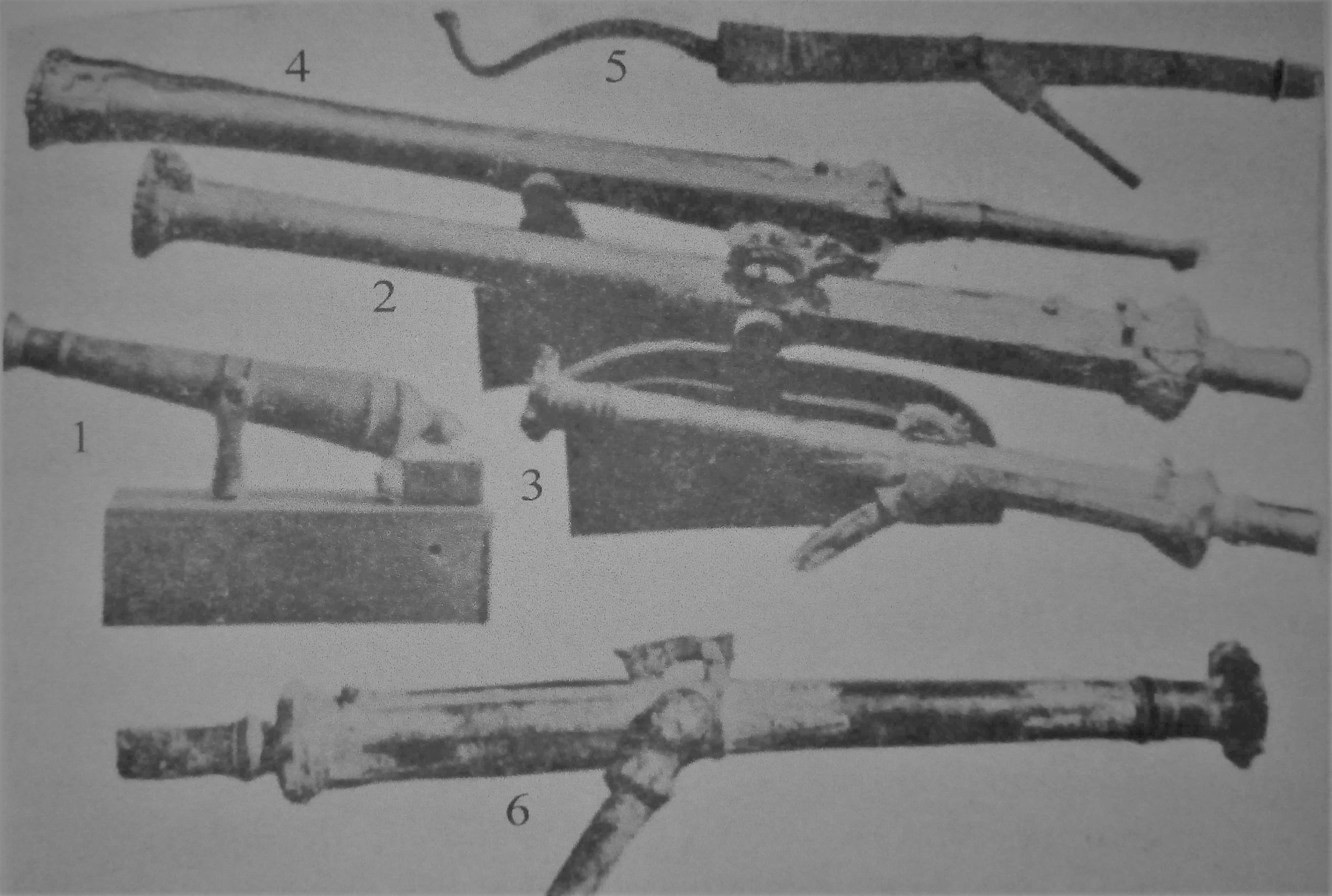
Variety of Malay cannons: (1) Meriam kalok, short and squat swivel gun. (2) Lela. (3) Lela (or rentaka). (4) Lela rambang (blunderbuss lela). (5) Ekor lotong. (6) Lela.

Malays likely did make their own cannons before 1509, but not to the extent as the Ottoman Empire. But just like muskets, they became widespread after 1511. With many recorded usages in the Anglo-Bruneian War, Perak War and et cetera. With most cannons were made of bronze or brass and the earliest ones were breechloaders. Michael Charney (2004) pointed out that early Malay swivel guns were breech-loaded. There is a trend toward muzzle-loading weapons during colonial times.

In 1600 CE, lela cannons were becoming more common in the archipelago. Several renowned foundries of the Malay World were Terengganu in the Malay peninsula and Brunei and Banjarmasin in Borneo.

Brunei was known for its foundries in the 19th century. Brass was the preferred metal as it was cheaper and easier to work compared to the related but harder alloy bronze, or iron. However, bronze is much stronger and was therefore more popular for use in making weapons. The process used was cire perdue using terracotta and a wax mould.

The types of the cannons used by Malays includes:

- Cetbang
- Lantaka
- Meriam kalok
- Lela
- Lela rambang
- Ekor lotong

=== Fortifications ===
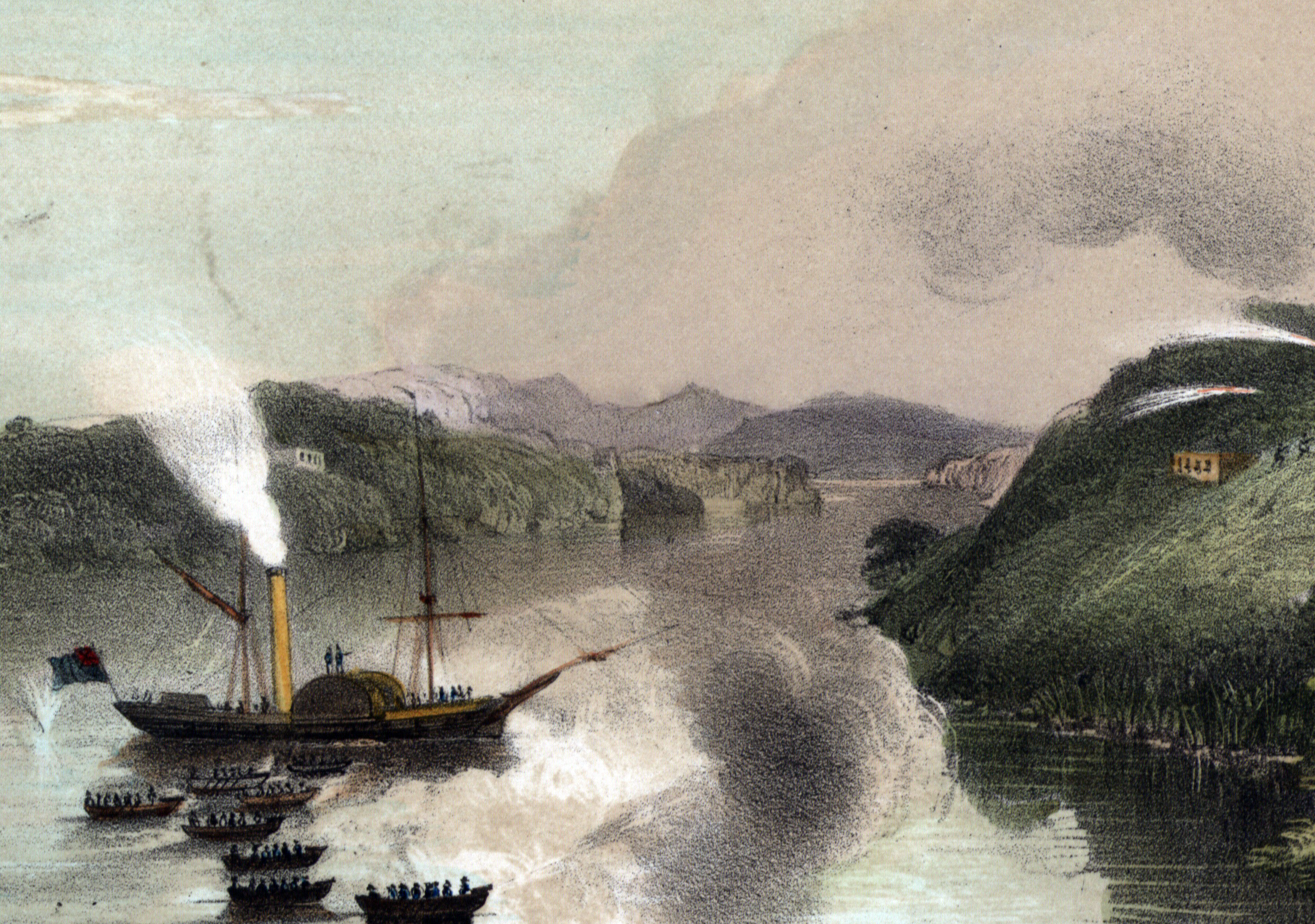
The HEIC Phlegethon repelling attacks from Bruneian fortifications during the Anglo-Bruneian War

Malays are recorded to use forts (kota) and stockades (kubu) which they commonly used the lela on the corners of a fort or stockade, so they could cover alternately two different walls. the lela were also used in defense of the stockades behind which the Malays usually fight. It should be noted however stockades were temporary and would only be erected during times of war.

They also used trenches and booby traps, often using the knowledge of the environment to their advantage especially against European forces, who were often better armed but not accustomed to the jungles.

They sabotaged routes usually by felling trees along the route as it would take a long time to remove a single tree.

=== Naval technologies ===
Post-Malacca Malay navies are known for their extensive use of perahu and apilan & kota mara ships however they also use penjajap, lancaran and later the ghali and ghurab.

Malays historically preferred to use shallow draught, oared longships similar to the galley. (Note: During the 1511 Portuguese attack on Malacca Sultanate, the Malays use lancaran (lanchara) and penjajap (pangajaoa). Kelulus (calaluz) was used on several expeditions before and after the fall of Malacca.) Which opposed the Javanese preference, which preferred long-range, deep-draught round ships such as jong and malangbang. The reason for this difference is that the Malays operated their ships in riverine water, sheltered straits zone, and archipelagic environment, while the Javanese are often active in the open and high sea. After contact with the Portuguese and Spanish, both the Javanese and Malay fleets began to use the ghurab and ghali more frequently.

Lela were also used in Banjarese fortified raft called kotta mara. The kotta mara could be used as floating battery or as a water castle. Rectangular kotta mara could be equipped with 12 lela, while the kotta mara with corner bastions could mount 16 lela.

Lela were mounted on the apilan (gunshield) of Malay war and piratical prahu. Sunting apilan is the name given to two lelas or light guns standing on the gun-shield of a heavy gun.

Lieutenant T.J. Newbold recorded about the Malay pirate prahu:

The prahus used by Malay pirates are from eight to ten tons burthen, extremely well manned and remarkably fast, particularly with the paddles commonly used. They are generally armed with swivels on their bows, centre, and stern, of small calibre, but long range. When preparing to attack, strong bulwarks of wood called Apilans are erected, behind which the crew ensconce themselves, fighting with their long guns until their prey is disabled; or till the gong sound the signal for boarding.

— Journal of the Asiatic Society of Bengal, Volume 5
