= Chase gun =

Cannon mounted in the bow or stern of a sailing ship

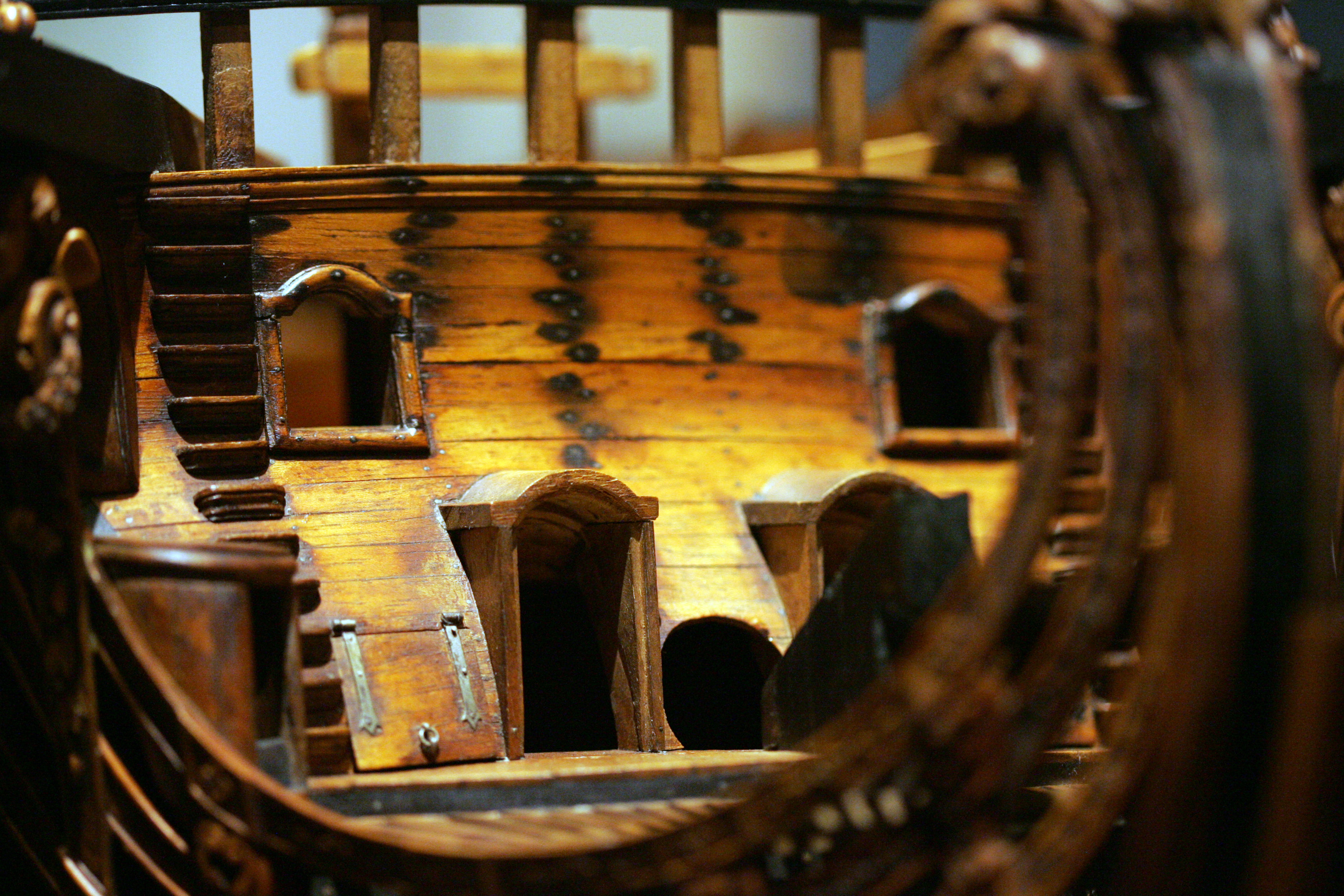
Gunports high on either side of the forecastle in this contemporary small-scale model of the bow of the Soleil Royal show that chase guns could be fired from either side of the bowsprit

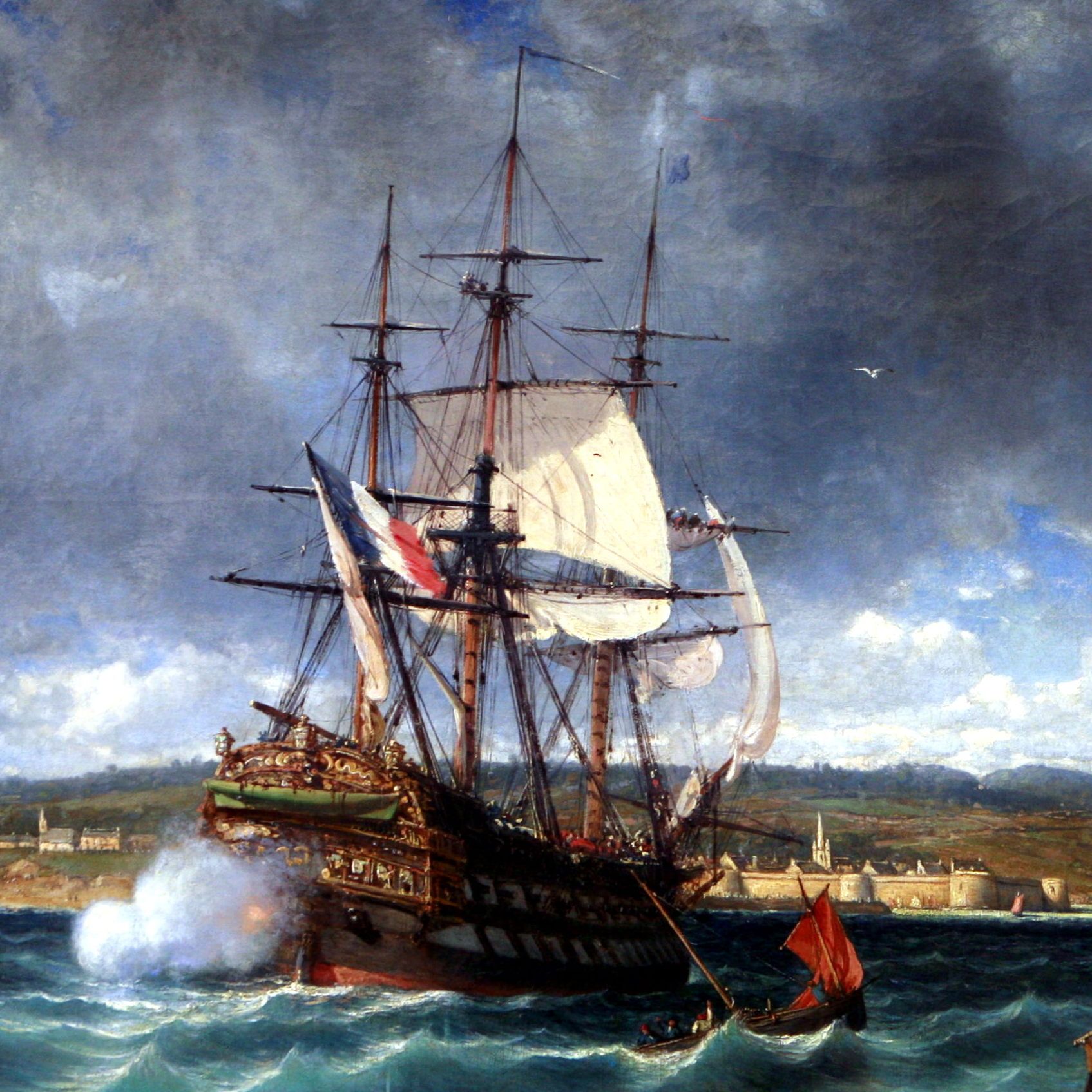
The Vétéran, chased by a British squadron, finds shelter in Concarneau harbour. The smoke cloud at her transom indicates that she is firing her port-side stern chase gun.

A chase gun (or chaser), usually distinguished as bow chaser and stern chaser, was a cannon mounted in the bow (aiming forward) or stern (aiming backward) of a sailing ship. They were used to attempt to slow down an enemy ship either chasing (pursuing) or being chased, when the ship's broadside could not be brought to bear. Typically, the chasers were used to attempt to damage the rigging and thereby cause the target to lose performance.

Bow chasers could be regular guns brought up from the gundeck and aimed through specially cut-out ports on either side of the bowsprit, or dedicated weapons made with an unusually long bore and a relatively light ball, and mounted in the bow. Stern chasers could also be improvised, or left permanently in the cabins at the stern, covered up and used as part of the furniture.

== Development ==
In the Age of Sail, shiphandling had been brought to a high art, and chases frequently lasted for hours or sometimes days, as each crew fine-tuned their sails to take advantage of small variations in the wind. Chase guns of this era were commonly made of brass rather than iron, as this improved their accuracy. A single lucky shot could cut through a critical line, or cause a sail to split if the wind was strong, so if the ships were within range the best gunners on each would use their chasers to make carefully aimed and timed shots at the other. Despite this, most chase guns were of limited accuracy even when aiming at the sizeable target of an enemy ship's rigging. In one eighteenth-century example, a British crew fired seventy-two shots from their vessels' bow chasers before hitting the sails of a fleeing enemy craft.

By the late eighteenth century, Royal Navy crews were progressively being trained in the use of artillery in chases. The cannons themselves were also modified to maximise their effectiveness as chase guns, including reshaping of their gun carriages to allow for greater elevation and longer range. From 1799 Royal Navy frigates were universally supplied with two bow and two stern chasers, as these were the vessels most likely to be engaged in the pursuit of fleeing enemies.

== Chase guns in World War II ==
Chase guns forward, or aft-facing naval guns were reintroduced during the Second World War in a modernised form aboard escort destroyers, corvettes, and motor gun boats. Their role was to provide immediate offensive capability against surfaced U-boats and fast E-boats without needing to manoeuvre or rely on depth charges. In this regard, being used from a high and weatherly bow against small targets with a very low profile, their tactical employment was intended to remove a blind spot through a vertical arc (below the prow at short range) rather than through a narrow horizontal arc at longer ranges.

=== Against U-boats ===
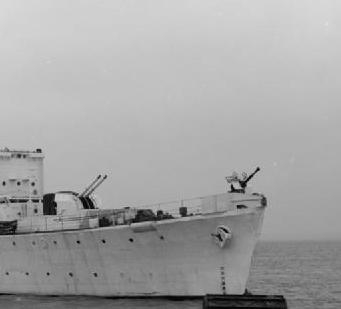
Chase gun of a Hunt-class destroyer

On convoy escorts, particularly Hunt-class destroyers and Flower-class corvettes, bow-mounted chase guns were used to engage surfaced U-boats. Ships would illuminate the submarine with searchlights, then open fire with chase-mounted weapons aimed at the conning tower or pressure hull, forcing the U-boat to dive and abort its attack. This tactic was effective before the widespread deployment of forward throwing anti-submarine weapons like the Hedgehog or Squid.

=== Against E-boats ===
German E-boats (Schnellboote), fast torpedo craft used in the English Channel and North Sea, posed a major threat to coastal convoys. To counter these, many British escorts, especially Hunt-class destroyers, were fitted with a bow-mounted QF 2-pounder "pom-pom" autocannons as chase guns. One example occurred during a 1945 patrol by HMS Cubitt, when her forward-mounted pom-pom opened fire on an approaching group of E-boats.

=== Summary ===
- Chase guns were adapted to modern naval warfare as a flexible defensive and offensive measure.
- Against U-boats, they allowed quick reaction to surfaced threats, preventing successful torpedo attacks.
- Against E-boats, bow-mounted autocannons like the QF 2-pounder naval gun disrupted enemy approach patterns.
- The concept, rooted in Age of Sail tactics, proved valuable in close-in, high-speed naval combat of the Second World War.

== See also ==
- Apilan and kota mara
- Gun shield
- History of gunpowder
- Naval artillery in the Age of Sail
- Naval tactics in the Age of Sail

== Bibliography ==
- Canney, Donald L. (2001). Sailing warships of the US Navy. Chatham Publishing / Naval Institute Press. p. 224. ISBN 1557509905.
- Willis, Sam (2008). Fighting at Sea in the Eighteenth Century: The Art of Sailing Warfare. The Boydell Press. ISBN 9781843833673.
