= Banjarmasin War =

War in the Dutch East Indies

- Part of military campaigns of the Dutch Empire
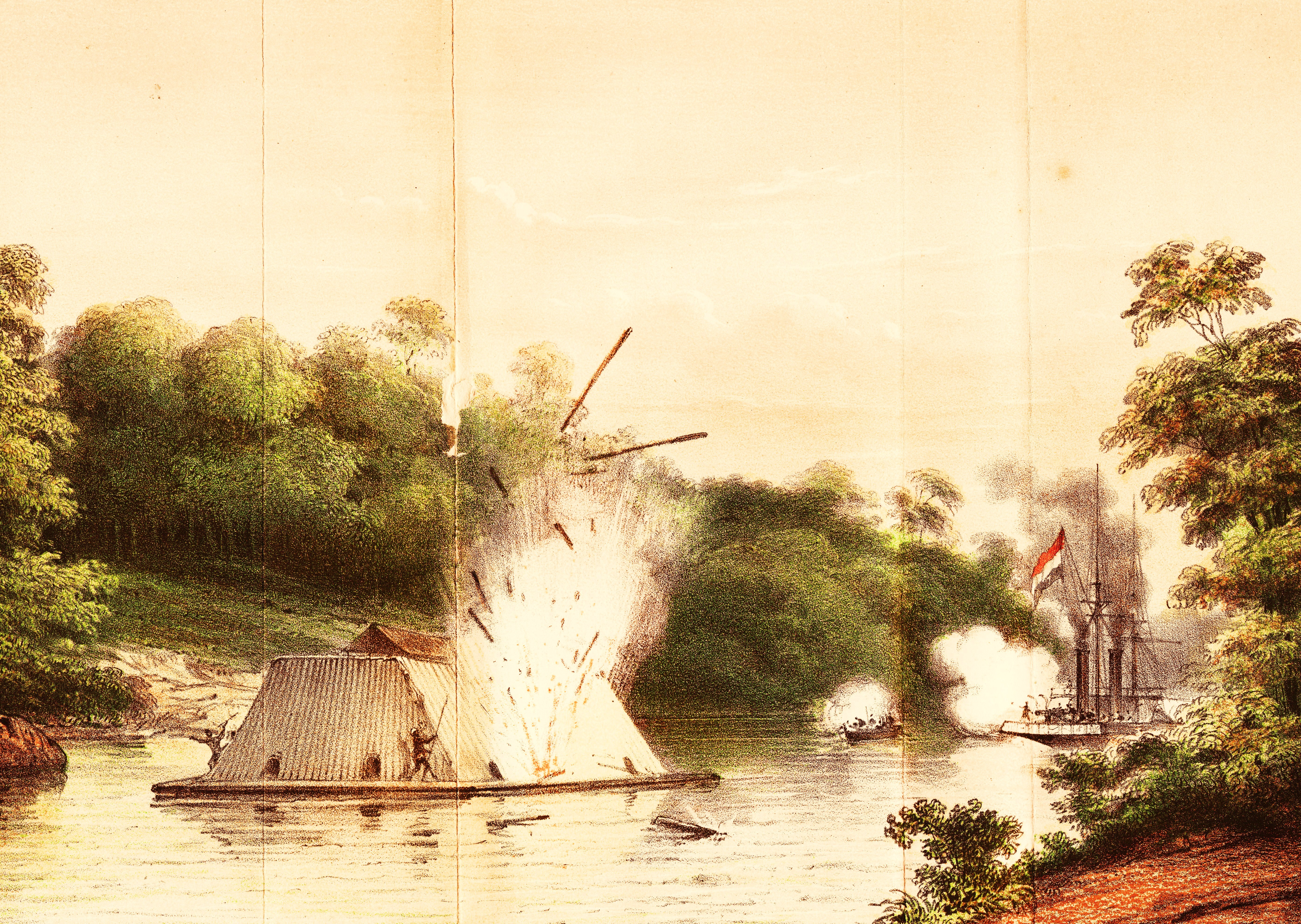
- The steamship Celebes fighting with armed Dayak vessel (kotta mara) using its aftside 30-pounder.
| Date | 1859 – 1863; Sporadic fighting until 1905 |
| Location | Kalimantan, Borneo |
| Result | Dutch victory; Hidayat II exiled to Cianjur |

Belligerents
| Sultanate of Banjar; (pro-Tamjid, 1859–60); Dutch Empire | Sultanate of Banjar; (pro-Hidayat) |

Commanders and leaders
| Tamjidillah II of Banjar; A.J. Andresen; Gustave Verspyck | Hidayatullah II of Banjar (surrendered); Demang Lehman (executed); Amin Ullah; Prince Antasari #; Muhammad Seman † |

Casualties and losses
| At least 5,000 killed (204 European); 2 Steamship sunk; Hundreds of Indo people and European civilians killed | more than 6,000 killed |

The Banjarmasin War (also known as Bandjermasin War; Banjar: ڤراڠ بنجر, romanized: Perang Banjar, Dutch: Bandjermasinse Oorlog, or formally Expeditie naar de Zuider- en Oosterafdeling van Borneo) (1859–1863) was a war of succession in the Sultanate of Banjarmasin, as well as a colonial war for the restoration of Dutch authority in the eastern and southern section of Borneo.

== War ==
A struggle for power ensued between Tamjid and Hidayat, which divided the population. In early 1859, a revolt broke out east of Martapura, and Hidayat was sent to quell it. He acquired a document, signed and sealed by Tamjid, which urged the rebels to 'wreak mischief in a manner that people will think it was caused by the governor.' Hidayat was furious at Tamjid, resigned as governor and retired from politics. Tamjid then informed him he and his supporters would be punished for insubordination by troops and steamships provided by the Dutch. Colonel Augustus Johannes Andresen landed his forces on Borneo at the end of April 1859, and on 29 April 1859 assumed military command at Bandjermasin. On 1 May he suspended the Resident and himself took up civil administration as well.

== Background ==
=== 17th century ===
Since 1606 the East United India Company maintained contacts with the island of Borneo. In 1635 the first contract was signed with the Sultanate of Banjarmasin for the provision of pepper - at the time, a luxury product in Europe and a major reason for the Dutch interest in this region.

In following decades there were several skirmishes and armed clashes, especially related to such pepper contracts being unfulfilled. One of the most serious was the 1638 killing of 64 Dutch and 21 of their Japanese partners, at Kota Waring in Bandjermasin.

=== Early 19th century ===
In 1809 Herman Willem Daendels, then governor of the Dutch East Indies, decided to abandon Bandjermasin, as maintaining a presence there was considered uneconomical. However, in 1811 the British, who took over the islands in the context of the Napoleonic Wars, established a presence there, notably in Alexander Hare who established an independent state of Maluka on the S.Maluka river which runs into the Java Sea not far S.E. of the Barito.

In December 1816, British authority returned to the Dutch, who signed a new contract with the Sultan. Though he continued to reign, in January 1817 the Sultan's flag was replaced by the Dutch one. Effective power in the Sultanate was increasingly taken up by the Dutch Resident.

Following years were marked by multiple small revolts, and by further unequal contracts being signed.

=== Succession crisis ===
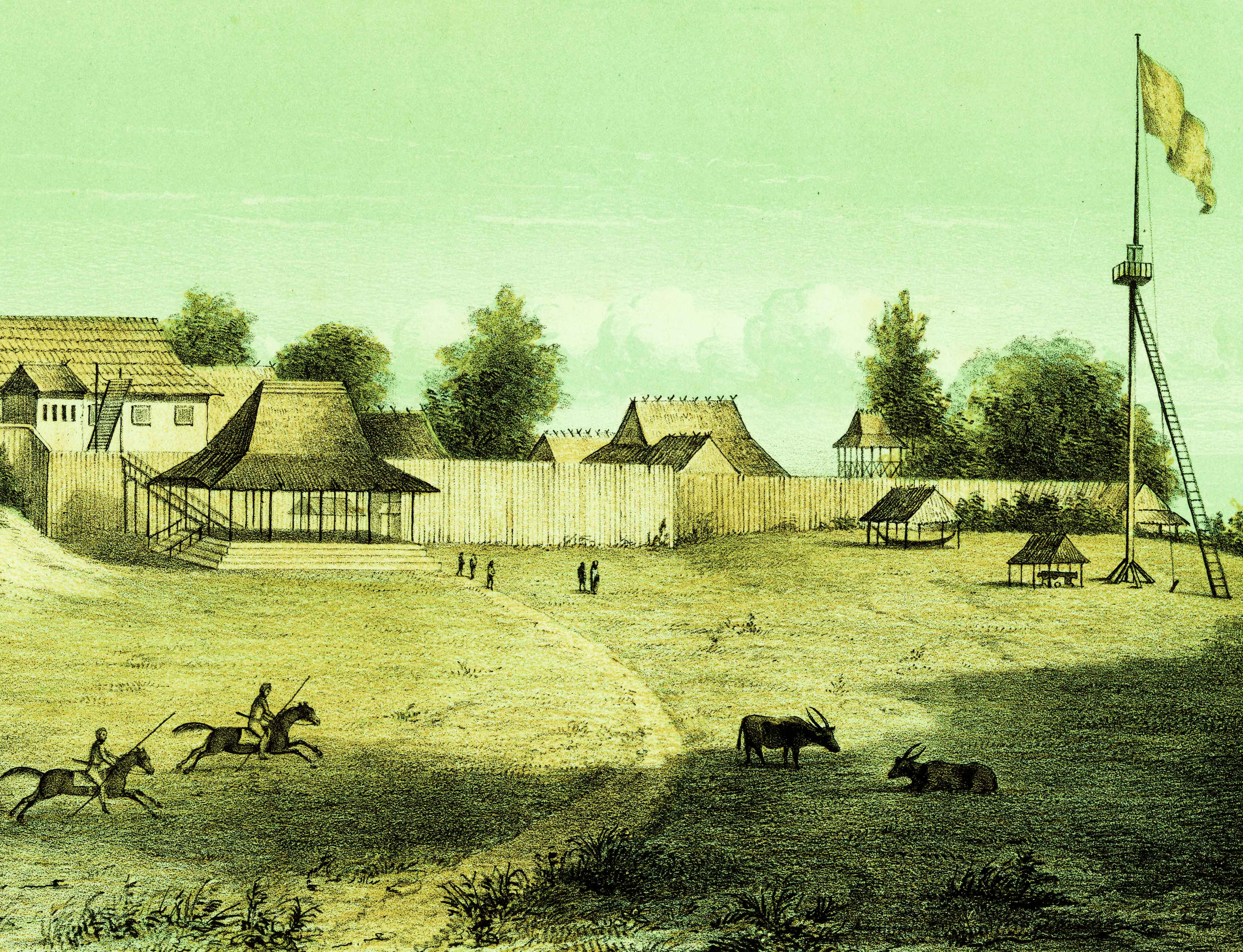
The Kraton (palace) of the Sultan of Bandjermasin

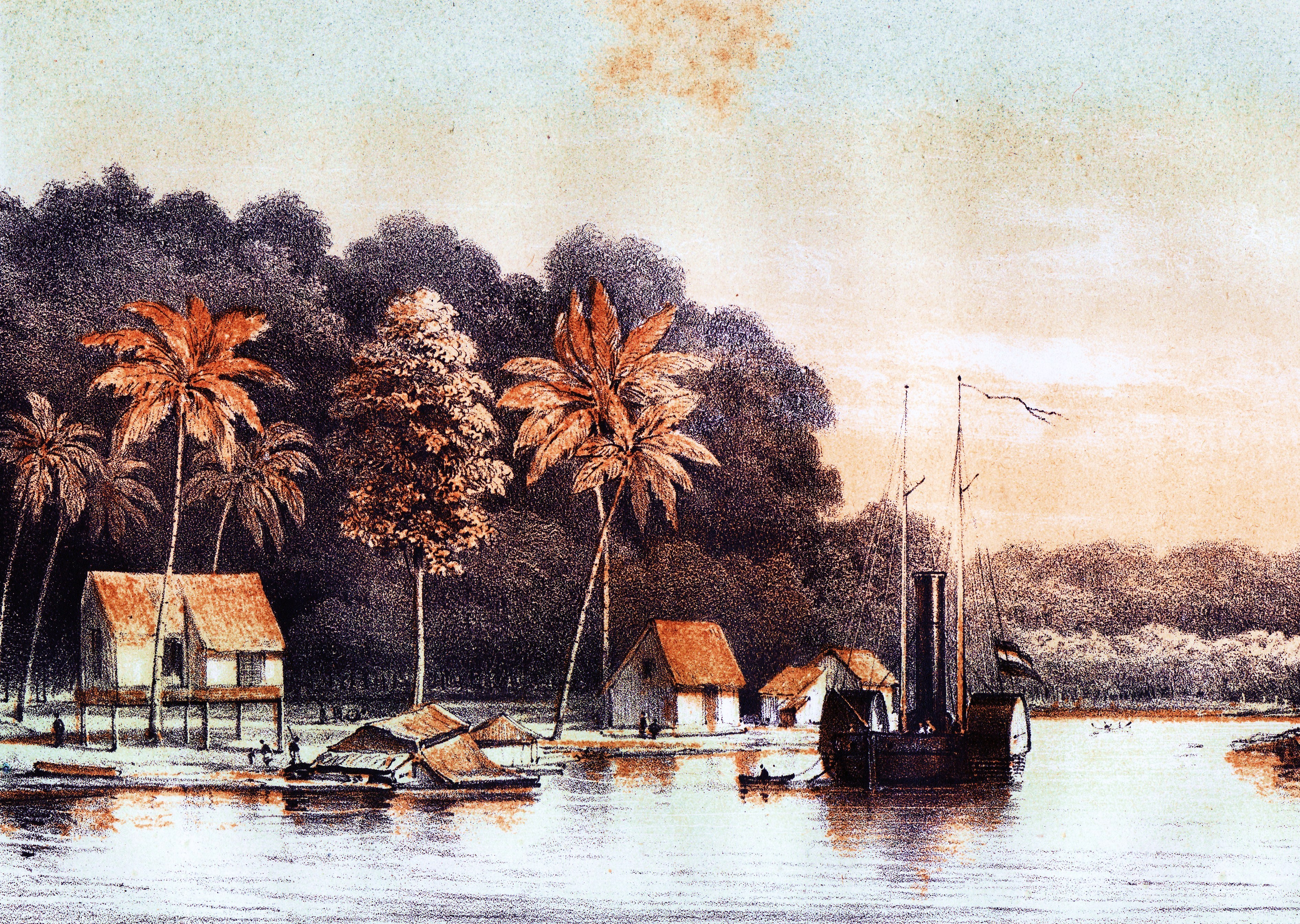
The Onrust in Lalutung Tuor.

In 1852 the Sultan's heir-apparent died, and the Dutch replaced him by the illegitimate grandson Tamjied Illah.

In vain, Sultan Adam and many nobles in 1853 sent an emissary to Batavia, pointing out iniquities perpetrated by the Dutch-designated heir and appealing for the Dutch to recognise instead Hidayat, a younger but legitimate son. In his testament, probably written in late 1853 or early 1855, Sultan Adam appointed Hidayat as his successor, and that anyone who failed to respect his wishes was to be put to death. The Dutch Indies Government continued to reject Hidayat's nomination, however, offering him the position of governor instead. In this impasse, a brother of the deceased heir-apparent, Prabu Anom, proclaimed himself the new sultan in Martapura in 1855, asserting that he was now a better candidate than the other two. The Government responded by sending a warship to Martapura in 1856, demanding Adam in a letter to respect the contract, the choice of governor, providing Tamjid with an act of recognition as successor, and imprisoning his rival Prabu Anom. Under this pressure, Adam agreed to name Tamjid his successor and support Hidayat's nomination for the governorship.

Sultan Adam died in November 1857 and was succeeded by Tamjid, formally installed by the Dutch resident van Bentheim in Martapura without incident. However, when he tried to hold a meeting with (the earlier released) Prabu Anom, he escaped. Van Bentheim ordered Hidayat to extradite Prabu Anom within 8 days, and after some hesitation, Hidayat complied when he was given assurances his uncle would retain his freedom. Nevertheless, the Government broke its promise, arrested and banished Prabu Anom to Java. In protest, Hidayat asked to resign as governor, but was refused. During the year 1858, Tamjid and Hidayat appear to have cooperated in their opposition to the Dutch Indies Government, but due to mutual mistrust, their collaboration was ineffective.

== Massacre of Europeans (1859) ==
On 1 May 1859, all the Europeans at the Julia Hermina coal mine at Kalangan were murdered, as were all at the missionary settlement near Poctor Petak. At the mine, Englishman James Motley, his wife, and three children, all died. Hidayat responded with loyalty to the Dutch: he was the first to alarm the Government of what had happened during the attack on the Pengaron mining complex three days earlier and the further attack plans of the rebels; when the mining complex at Kalangan was assaulted on 1 May, he tracked down the women and children who survived the attack and put them under protection in Bandjermasin, and he helped organise the defence.

== Abdication and sultanate's abolition ==
Tamjid abdicated the throne in June 1859 when he felt unable to continue his reign any longer amidst the escalating rebellion. After a thorough inquiry, Andresen trusted Hidayat completely, and pleaded with him to come to Bandjermasin to become the new sultan. However, Hidayat was unable to trust Andresen in return, hesitating to act on the latter's repeated requests to take the crown. Meanwhile, the Government in Batavia was dissatisfied with Andresen's policies and recalled him in October 1859.

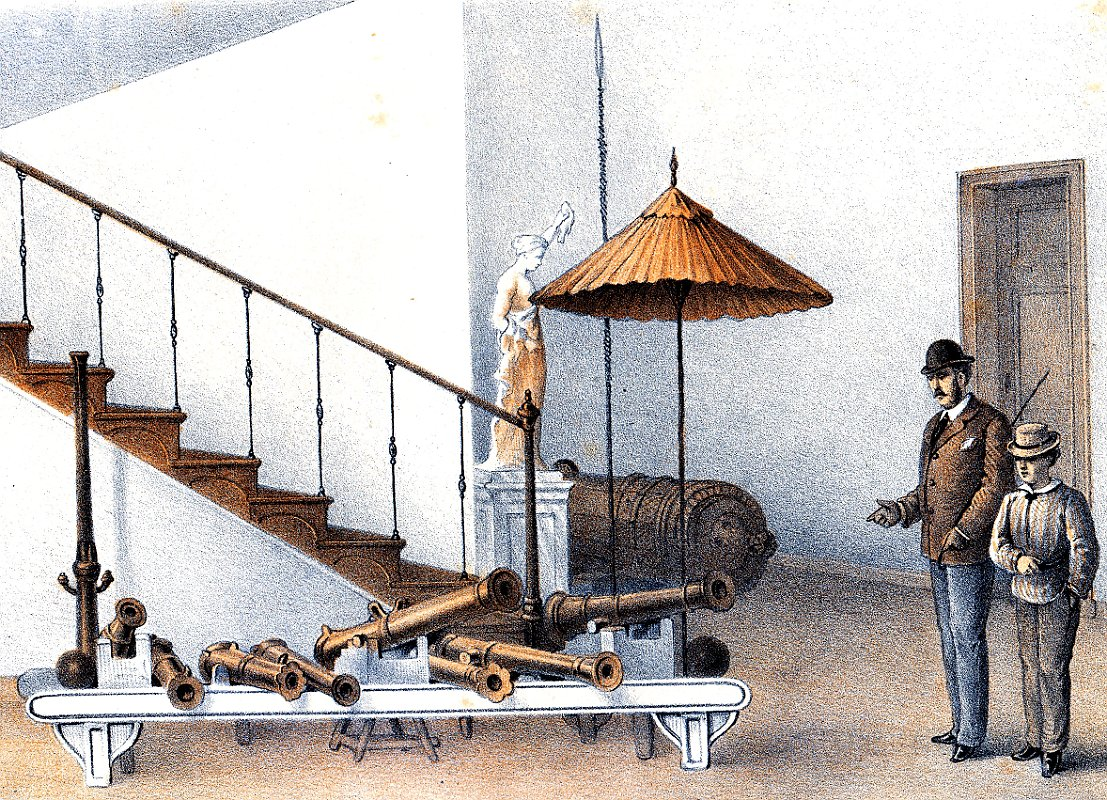
Largest cannon (right) that has been captured from the Kraton of Martapura, 1859. There are several small cannons that likely belongs to lela and rentaka type.

While fighting the rebels, the Dutch Indies Government declared Hidayat a renegade and stripped him of his gubernatorial position. Seeing no other candidate to succeed Tamjid, the Dutch abolished the Sultanate of Bandjermasin in its entirety, and put the territory under direct control of Batavia. There is little evidence to suggest Hidayat himself ever took part in the rebellion against the Dutch Government, although it was often said to have been fought in his name. After wandering from place to place, Hidayat surrendered himself to the Dutch in early 1862; he was given a house in Cianjur (Dutch: Tjandjoer) in West Java and a monthly subsidy of 1,000 guilders by the Dutch Indies Government, leading a peaceful life to the end of his days.

== Attack on Martapura (1859) ==
On June 30 1859, kiai Demang Leman attacked the Dutch post at the Martapura palace. In August 1859 together with Sheikh Buya Yasin and Kiai Langlang, Kiai Demang Lehman succeeded in capturing the Dutch fort in Tabanio.

== Battle of Fort Tabanio (1859) ==
Meanwhile, the Bone warship was sent by the Dutch to Tanah Laut to reclaim the Fort Tabanio which had been controlled by Demang Lehman in a terrible Dutch battle. When Marine Lieutenant Cronental's troops stormed the Tabanio fort, 9 Dutch soldiers were killed, and the remaining Dutch troops were forced to withdraw in defeat. A second attack by the Dutch was carried out, but the fort was defended bravely by Demang Lehman, Kiai Langlang, and Penghulu Sheikh Haji Buya Yasin and other figures. Because the Dutch soldiers' attack was supported by the navy which fired cannons from warships, while the land troops stormed the Tabanio fort, Demang Lehman and Habib Shohibul Bahasyim's troops escaped without leaving any casualties. The Dutch considered that the victory against the Tabanio fort was meaningless, if you take into account the number of facilities deployed, 15 cannons and a number of shiny weapons, it turned out that they were not successful in crippling the forces of Demang Lehman.

== Storming of Bumi Selamat Palace (1859) ==
On August 30, 1859, Demang Lehman left for the Bumi Selamat Palace with 3,000 troops and suddenly surprised the Dutch by carrying out a sudden attack, causing the Dutch to be confused about facing him, which almost killed Lieutenant Colonel Boon Ostade. In this sudden attack, Demang Lehman rode his horse bravely after Lieutenant Colonel Boon Ostade. The attack on the Bumi Selamat Palace failed because it was confronted by Dutch troops who were gathering to carry out a weapons inspection. Fierce fighting occurred, so that Demang Lehman members lost 10 people who became syahid, as well as dozens of Dutch who fell victim.

== Battle of Fort Gunung Lawak (1859) ==
On September 27 1859 a battle also took place at the Gunung Lawak fort which was defended by Kiai Demang Lehman and his friends. In this battle, Kiai Demang Leman's troop strength turned out to be smaller than the enemy's strength, so he was forced to resign. Because the people repeatedly carried out guerrilla attacks, after some time the Dutch occupied the fort, then damaged and abandoned it. While leaving the fort, the Dutch troops came under attack from Kiai Demang Lehman's troops who were still actively carrying out guerrilla warfare in the surrounding area.

== Storming of Fort Munggu Dayor (1859) ==
At the end of 1859 the people's troops led by Demang Lehman, Pangeran Antasari, Tumenggung Antaluddin gathered at Munggu Dayor fort. Demang Lehman was involved in heavy fighting around Munggu Dayor. The Dutch considered Demang Lehman as the most feared and most dangerous enemy and mobilized the power of the people as the right hand of Prince Hidayatullah. Demang Lehman invaded Martapura and murdered Dutch military leaders in the city of Martapura.

== Battle of Tundakan ==
On the 1861 the Dutch forces led by cpt .Van Langen and cpt. Van Heyden advanced through fort Tundakan. The Dutch attacked the fort with companion of 300 men,but the Banjar forces led by Djalil launched counterattack through Van Langen companion and forced the Dutch forces to retreated at Amutai.

== Barito River Campaign (1859) ==
At the end of 1859 the battlefield was spread across 3 locations, namely around Banua Lima, around Martapura and Tanah Laut and along the Barito River. The battlefield around Banua Lima was under the leadership of Tumenggung Abdul Jalil Kiai Adipati Anom, Wall Raja, the second field was under the leadership of Demang Lehman and Syarif Shohibul Bahasyim while the third field was under the leadership of Pangeran Antasari and Syarif Ali Al-Akbar Al-Aidid. and they won the battle.

== Battle of Fort Amawang (1860) ==
Demang Lehman and his troops planned to attack the Dutch fort in Amawang. Demang Lehman succeeded in smuggling two of his trusted men into the fort as Dutch workers. According to information from these two workers, Demang Lehman was determined to attack the Dutch fort. The Dutch received information that people had gathered at the Paring River to attack the Amawang fort. Based on this information, Dutch troops under the leadership of Munters took 60 soldiers and a cannon to the Paring River. When the troops left and were thought to have reached the Paring River, Demang Lehman attacked the Amawang fort at around 02.00 on the afternoon of March 31 1860, with 300 of his troops, Demang Lehman stormed the fort. When Demang Lehman's troops invaded, the two trusted men who were workers in the fort went berserk and caused chaos for the Dutch soldiers..

== Battle of Fort Tabanio (1861) ==
In the beginning of 1861, the Dutch commenced an assault on the Fortres of Tabaniau, which was previously captured by rebel forces. Even though Demang Lehman's forces were prepared for the assault, the attack quickly overwhelmed the defending forces after days of fighting .

== First Battle of Mount Pamaton (1861) ==
The First battle of Mount Pamaton was an military skrimishes between Dutch and Banjarmasin forces however tis skrimishes carried out after failed attack on martapura by the Banjar forces. However the dutch forces launched an military attack on Mount Pamaton but the attack were failed and many of the dutch commanders werw killed.

== Antasari versus Verspyck ==
Meanwhile, Prince Antasari and his rebels continued their revolt for three more years. As a distant descendant of a previous ruler, Antasari sought to restore the sultanate and reign over Banjar himself. However, Dutch major Govert Verspyck proved to be capable commander and managed to achieve a series of victories over the prince's forces. An outbreak of smallpox led to Antasari's death on 11 October 1862.

== Battle of Baras Kuning Fort (1905) ==
At the Battle of Baras Kuning Fort, Muhammad Seman died as a martyr after defending the fort from the Dutch invasion.

== Aftermath ==
The war ended with a Dutch victory in 1863. Occasional sporadic fighting continued until 1905.
