= Kotta mara =

Floating fort from Borneo

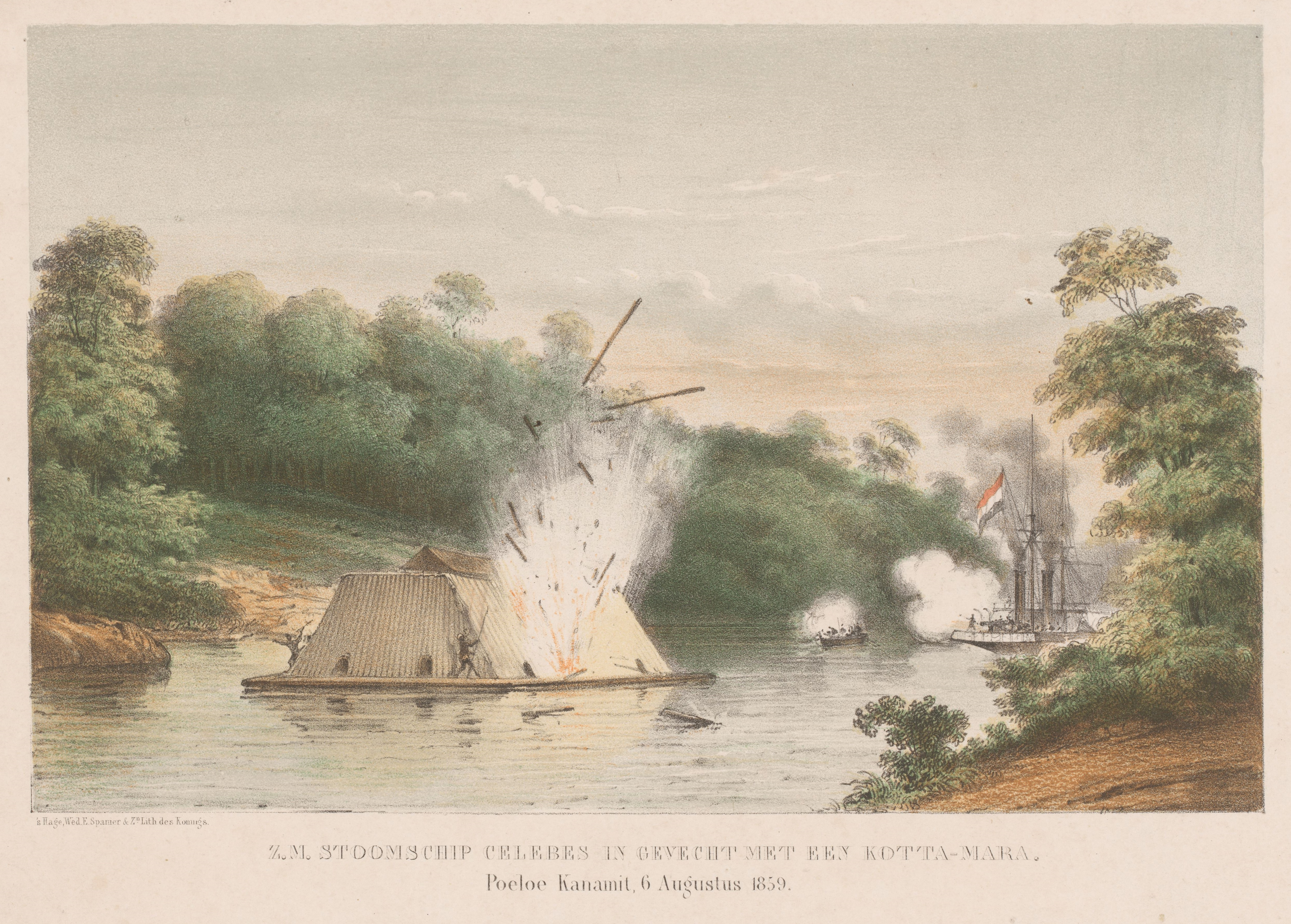
Z.M. Steamship Celebes fighting a kota mara, 6 August 1859 with its aftside 30-pounder.

Kotta mara is a type of floating battery or fortified raft from Borneo. It is used by native Bornean (Banjarese and Dayak) in warfare, its usage rose prominently during the Banjarmasin war (1859–1906). Kotta mara is used in riverine warfare, as an armed vessel or simply a blockhouse or fortification to prevent enemy advance in the river.

== Etymology ==
The word kotta comes from Malay word kota which in turn comes from the Sanskrit word कोट्ट (kota) which means fort, fortress, castle, fortified house, fortification, works, city, town, or place encircled by walls. Mara likely a corruption of Malay word muara which means estuary, thus the name kotta mara means estuary fort. In various publications it is also written as kotta-mara, kota mara, kotamara, and cotta mara. In Indonesian sources it is known as lanting kotamara, with the word "lanting" meaning raft house, a traditional Banjar floating house. According to the Great Indonesian Dictionary (KBBI), kota mara means (1) Wall on a ship to protect men mounting the cannon (2) Terrace or wall over a castle which a cannon is mounted. According to H. Warington Smyth, kota mara means transverse deck bulkhead at stem and stern (of a ship).

== Description ==
Kotta mara is shaped like a fort on a raft. The common shape is rectangular. However, there are version with bastion-like structure protruding on every corner.

The kotta mara with bastion, like the one seen by Jacob Jansz de Roy, is constructed from wooden logs of various size and diameter. The bastions had 4 cannons each, with the total of 16 cannons. The bastion is fortified with wooden wall of small sloping. Toward the center of the kotta mara is double row of palisade wall, one is higher than the other. At the center is the main structure of the "castle", about 12 feet (3.7 m) high to the top, over which 200 musket could fire. The main castle wall is not sloped.

The simpler kotta mara, is described as being similar to Banjar shore battery. It is rectangular in shape, with various size from as small as 5 Netherland ell (3.5 m) long to as large as to "fill the entire space of river passage". The general arrangement of the kotta mara was practically the same; the first one, from Sungai Kayu, was 5 Nd. ells (3.5 m) long, 5 Nd. ells wide and 3.5 Nd. ells (2.45 m) high, with 8 firing holes, which were situated just above the water level.

The large kotta mara (like that of Pulau Kanamit) is described with more accuracy: An elongated square window is located on a heavy raft, which is assembled from large trees. The inner space of this window is spacious in the length and width such that a deck can be laid from the split bamboo to form the floor and also to rig firm yokes and trestles against them, against which the top edge of the palisade will rest, while the feet of the posts are prevented by the above-mentioned window from slipping.

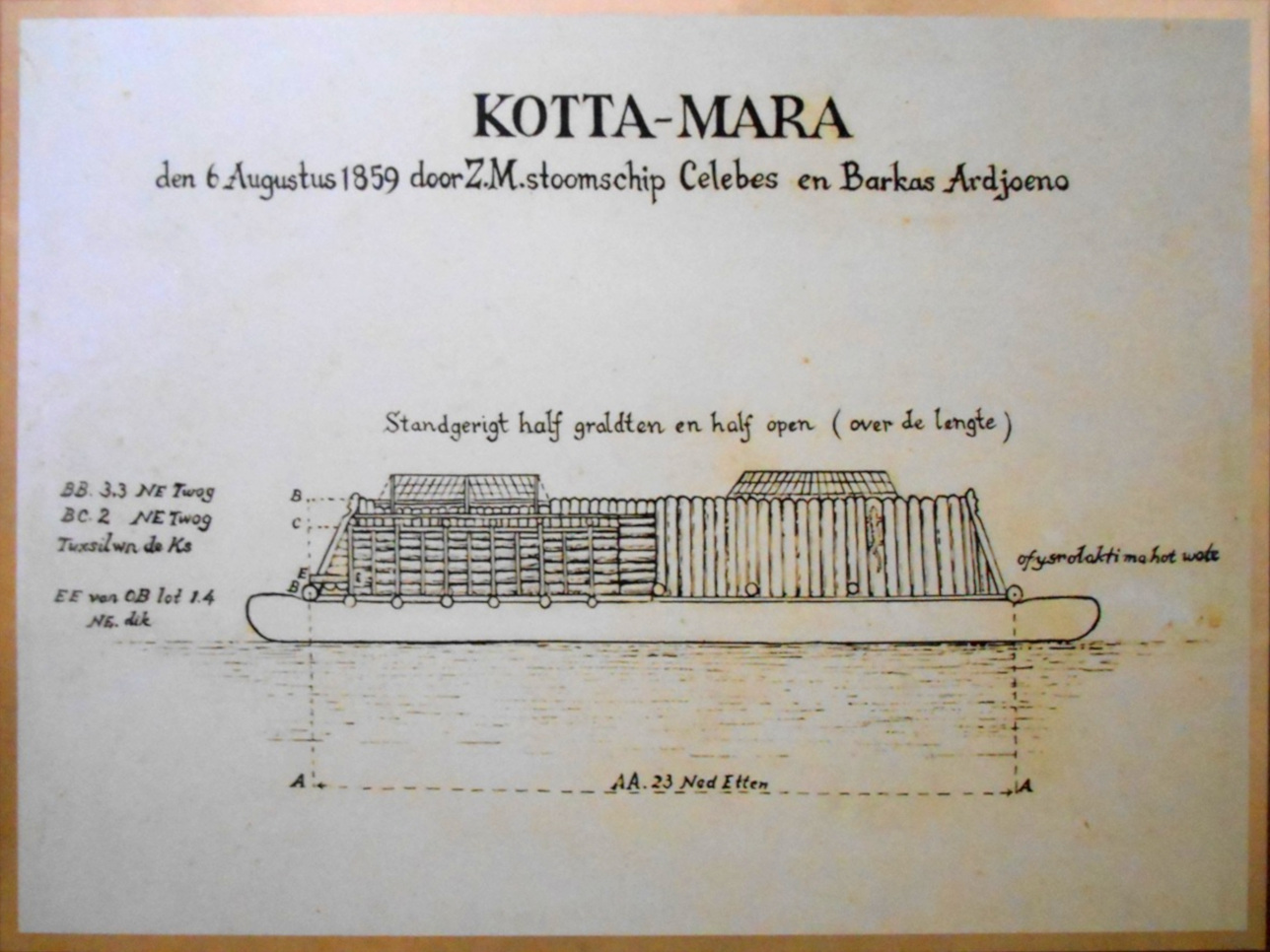
A sketch of the kotta mara encountered on 6 August 1859.

The wall of the fort is double; the outer covering consists of vertical, slight inwardly sloping trees which, placed against each other, are forming a parapet of nearly 5 Nd. palm (50 cm) thickness; a second wall of ironwood beams, similarly of a thickness of almost 0.5 Nd. ells (0.35 m) lies horizontally within this outer cover. This wall is prevented from falling backwards or loosened by means of anchoring and bracing. The raft is closed at the top by a cover of fairly heavy parts, was completely bomb-proof by an attic of beams.

There are 4 small alcove hole at equal distances in the long side, very low on the water and almost all with polders (heavy pieces of wood) on the inside to place lila (lela—Malay cannon) on it; in the short side there are 2 holes, so that the kotta mara could be armed with 12 lilas.

The outer covering was arranged in such a way that if a hole was made by a penetrating bullet, it would immediately closed again by the rolling of other parts or logs, which were set against the outer posts completely loosely.

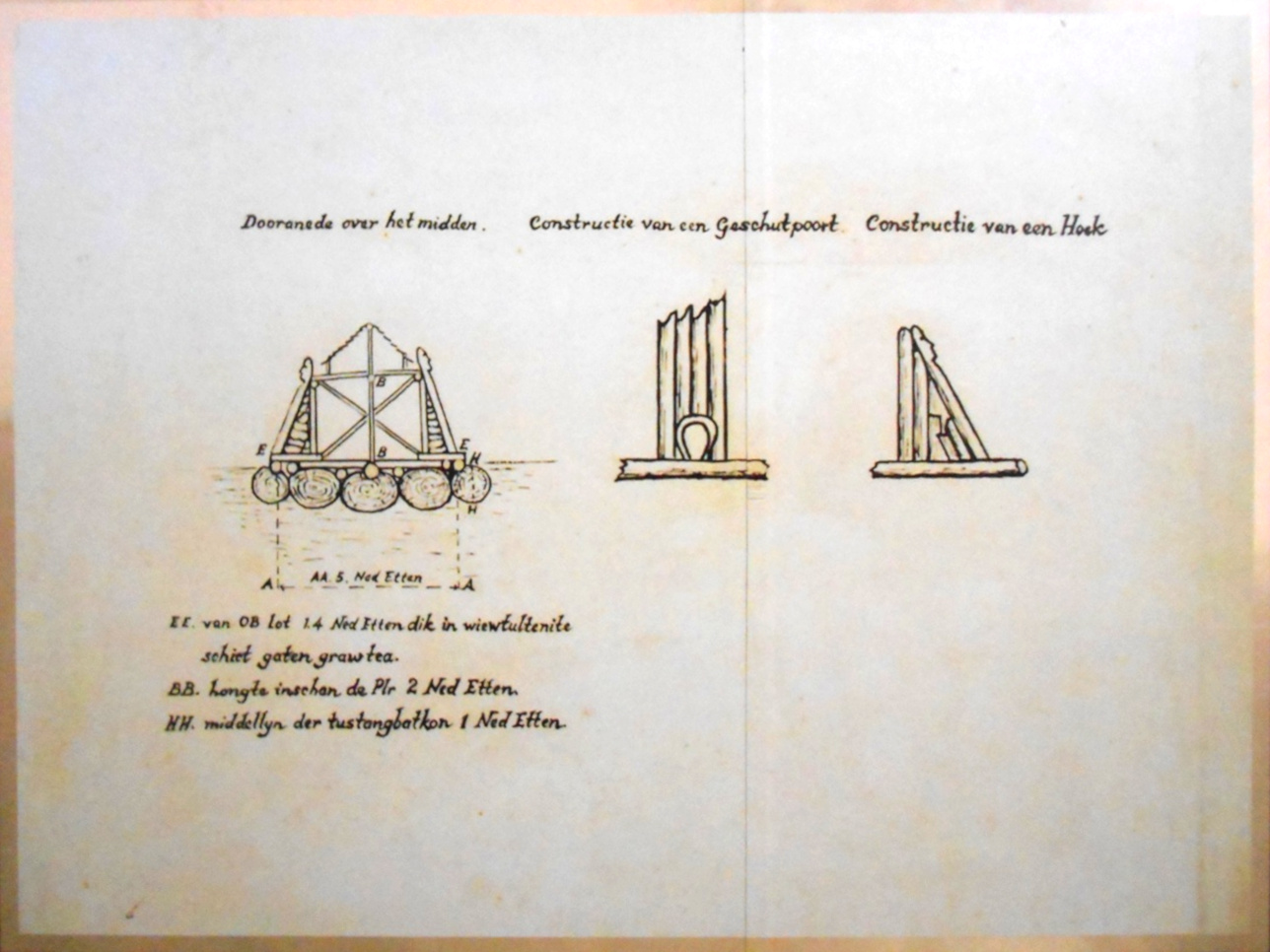
A sketch showing cross section of the raft from 6 August across the center, construction of a firing hole, and the construction of a corner post.

The upper deck is almost 0.75 Nd. ells (0.525 m) below the top edge of the palisade, which at that height has not been doubled with ironwood. On the deck were two small houses set up, in one of those houses a cell block was found, which could hold 5 or 6 prisoners. The spies assured the Dutch that Juragan Kuat had intended this block for the officers he would take prisoner. A magazine of foodstuffs, blocks and shackles to store prisoners of war, a roof to sleep in and many other conveniences were present.

When that kotta mara was taken, it was still not fully completed, so probably many more ornaments were missing. However, the 4 main posts of the building had already been carved in the shape of a man with an exceptionally large nose, mouth with sharp teeth, and the lower part of the body ending in the tail of a caiman.

There was enough room inside the building for about 50 people, however the operation of the artillery must have been difficult, since the braces and struts crossed each other frequently, but everything bore the signs of solid construction.

Here are dimensions of the raft encountered on 27 July 1859 from De Bandjermasinsche Krijg:

Length of the raft: 40 Nd. ells (28 m)

Width: 12 Nd. ells (8.4 m)

Long side of the palisade: 25 Nd. ells (17.5 m)

Short side of the palisade: 5 Nd. ells (3.5 m)

Height: 3.5 Nd. ells (2.45 m)

Thickness of the wall from below: 1 to 1.2 Nd. ells (0.7–0.84 m)

Thickness of the wall from above, below deck: 0.9 to 1 Nd. ells (0.63–0.7 m)

Average draft: 6 Rijnland feet (1.884 m)

== History ==
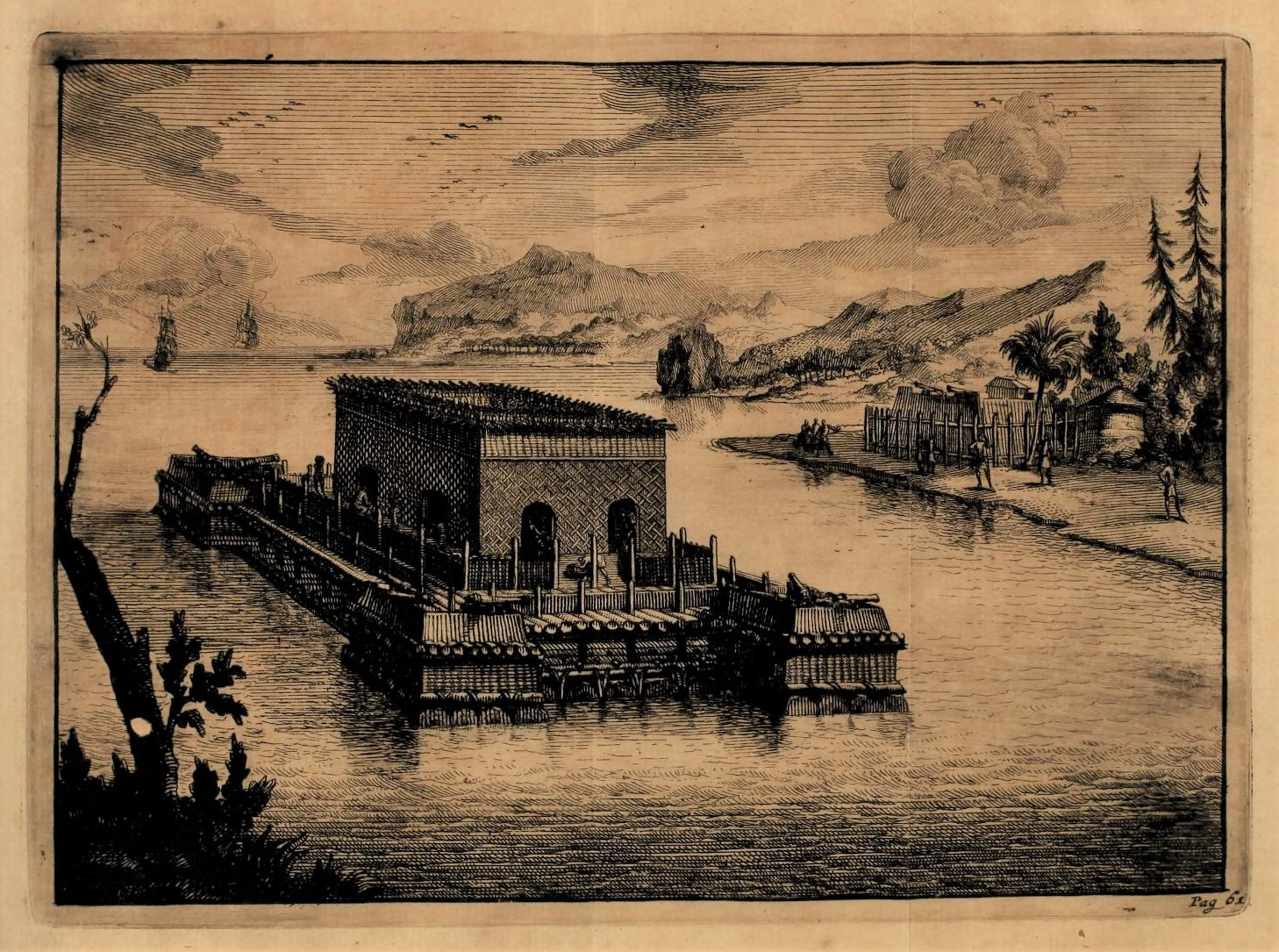
A drawing of a floating water castle (kotta mara) from Hachelijke reys-togt van Jacob Jansz de Roy.

According to W. A. van Rees, the kotta mara has been known by the Banjarese for centuries. The first kotta mara encountered by European is from 1691, being mentioned in the book "Hachelijke reys-togt van Jacob Jansz de Roy na Borneo and Atchin, in sijne vlugt of Batavia derwaards ondernomen in het jaar 1691 en vervolgens" as floating water castle (drijvend Water-Kasteel). This water-building was formidable that when the European shot a 8-pounder cannon to it, albeit with good charge, the cannon could not harm it.

During the Banjar war (1859–1906), there are several accounts of Kotta mara encounter by the Dutch, but only few are known to be written. According to Ahmad Barjie the kotta maras were ordered by Raden Jaya Anum of Middle Kapuas, also known as Juragan Kuat.

Among the most famous encounter is the one from 27 July 1859. The Dutch learned in Pulau Petak that a preparation of attack was being made at Sungai Kayu and three fortified rafts were being prepared; pembekkel (village chief) Soelil, who received his orders of prince Antasari, intended to launch a new attack on Pulau Petak, in which the rafts (kotta mara) would occupy the steamships, while the main attack with a large force on the land side would happen. On those occasions, the Celebes came to Pulau Petak and steamed (27 July) with the Tjipanas to the Sungai Kayu to stop the Banjar plan by an offensive act. They found (under the fire of new entrenchments) two kotta maras, one of which had not been completed. Only after a firefight of 4 hours could the rafts be taken over and dragged to Pulau Petak. The completed raft, which braved the fire of the 30-pounders for hours, was described by the Dutch in their report, mentioned earlier in this page.

At August 3, the Dutch was informed that there was still a kotta mara in Tongoehan or Pulau Palangkie. Steamship Celebes then steamed the Kapuas river to Palangka on 5 August, without finding any trace of a benting (Malay fort) or hostility anywhere. Second class sea lieutenant W. Steffens was sent in armed barkas (Note: Barkas in Dutch language may be translated as longboat or sloop. The modern indonesian word kapal bargas/kapal barkas means launch (boat).) on exploration, between Pulau Kanamit and the shore by rowing. After about half an hour, the officer returned and announced that the barkas had come across a kotta mara that filled the entire space of the passage, that large masses of people on that fortification had curiously stared at the barkas, without starting hostilities, and that it might be possible to get the Celebes backwards in the passage to shoot the kotta mara with the aftside 30-pounder cannon. Returning to Plankey in the evening, Mr. Maks informed that it would be impossible to enter the passage with the Celebes.

In the morning at 8:15 on August 6, 1859, Celebes was anchored before the passage. The armed barkas Ardjoeno, under the command of sea Lieutenant Clifford Kocq van Breugel, protected the troops, and exchanged some rifle and cartridge shot with the enemy hiding in the undergrowth. Finally the barkas came in the side of the kotta mara, releasing a cartridge shot from the 12-pound carronnade, but with no effect; the shot fell like grains of sand along the poles of the kotta mara's parapet.

The enemy shot guns on the sloops, but hastily left the fortification as soon as the steamship Celebes started to cooperate with the rear middle cannon. Probably it's because the Banjar and Dayak had been fighting with the Dutch's 30-pounder before, and at 35 ells (24.5 m) range (Note: There are also report that said the range is 50 ells (35 m).) the Banjar and Dayak didn't like it (because at this range the 30-pounder is able to penetrate the kotta mara). The first bullet shot took the head off one of the corner posts; a second shot destroyed a couple of plates. The third shot with a 16 duim (43.2 cm) grenade (exploding shell) struck in the middle of the long side, penetrated the outer casing and remained lodged against the inner casing of ironwood and exploded there. The outer poles were thrown apart over a length of almost 8 Nd. ells (5.6 m), the pieces also thrown high into the air, and a big hole emerged. Then the armed sloop under the command of W. Steffens was sent to take over the fortification. At about 11 o'clock the Dutch flag flew on the kotta mara and in the evening at 9 o'clock this fortification has been dragged to Plankey.

== See also ==
- Jong
- Melangbing
- Turtle ship
- Steamship
- City-class gunboat
