= Prince Antasari =

20th Sultan of Banjar (1862)

Prince Antasari ڤڠيرن انتساري
- Khalīfat al-Muʾminīn
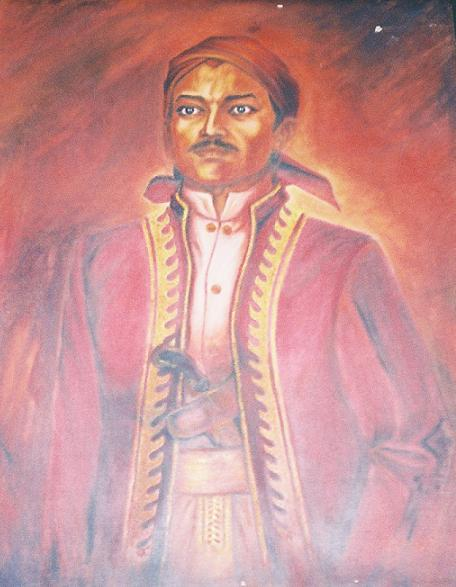
- Painting of Prince Antasari at the Lambung Mangkurat Museum.

Sultan of Banjar
- Reign: 14 March 1862 – 11 October 1862
- Predecessor: Hidayatullah II
- Successor: Muhammad Seman
- Born: Gusti Inu Kartapati; 1809; Kayu Tangi, Sultanate of Banjar.
- Died: 11 October 1862 (aged 52–53); Bayan Begok, Central Kalimantan.
- Spouses: Queen Idjah; Nyai Fatimah; Nyai Nala Nalaw
- Issue: Queen Hasiah; Panembahan Muhammad Said; Muhammad Seman; Princess Kaidah; Muhammad Gaoeng Mathias Gaung; Princess Selamah
Regnal name
- توان كبوه دولي يڠ مها مليا ڤدوك ڤانمبهان امير الدين خليفة المؤمنين ڤڠيرن انتساري; Tuan Kebawah Duli Yang Maha Mulia Paduka Panembahan Amiruddin Khalifatul Mukminin Pangeran Antasari
Posthumous name
- ڤانمبهان امير الدين; Panembahan Amiruddin
- House: Banjarmasin
- Father: Prince Mas'ud
- Mother: Ratu Khadijah
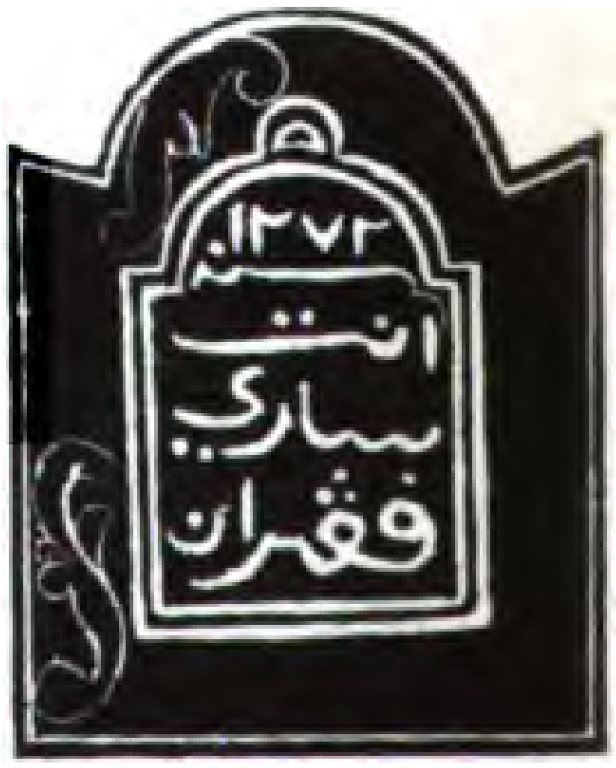
- Seal
- National Hero of Indonesia; S.K. President No. 06/TK/1968 dated 27 March 1968

Prince Antasari, (Banjar: ڤڠيرن انتساري, romanized: Pangéran Antasari; 1809 – 11 October 1862) titled Khalifatul Mukminin (lit. 'Caliph of the Believers') was 20th Sultan of Banjar who ruled in 1862, and is one of the important figures in the Banjarmasin War. In 1968, he was posthumously named a National Hero of Indonesia.

== Biography ==
Antasari was born in 1809. He was son of Prince Mashud and grandson of Prince Amir. He was a prince from a line of the royal family whose power had been usurped in the 18th century.

Antasari was concerned about the coronation of Sultan Tamjid (or Tamjidillah), instead of Prince Hidayat (or Hidayatullah), as the replacement to Sultan Adam in Banjar in 1859; Tamjidillah's coronation was backed by the Dutch colonials, who were looking to sow unrest and discord to make their attempts to take over Borneo easier. As Antasari wanted to repel the Dutch, he cooperated with the leaders of Martapura, Kapuas, Pelaihari, Barito, and Kahayan. He was also aided by Hidayatullah and Demang Leman.

On 18 April 1859, the Banjarmasin War broke out between Antasari's alliance, which was able to field some 6,000 armed men, and the Dutch. The war took place mainly in South and Central Kalimantan. Antasari's forces attacked the Dutch in Gunung Jabuk and also the Dutch coal mines in Pengaron. Meanwhile, his allies attacked other Dutch posts. They also attacked Dutch ships, killing Lieutenants Van der Velde and Bangert when they sank the ship Onrust in December 1859. Antasari rejected Dutch attempts to negotiate an end to the war, in which they offered him wealth and power in exchange for his surrender.

In early August 1860, Antasari's forces were in Ringkau Katan. They were defeated in a battle on 9 August, after Dutch reinforcements had arrived from Amuntai. Hidayatullah was exiled to Java, but Antasari, who succeeded him as Sultan, together with Prince Miradipa and Tumenggung Mancanegara, defended Tundakan fort on 24 September 1861. He also defended a fort in Mount Tongka on 8 November 1861 with Gusti Umar and Tumenggung Surapati.

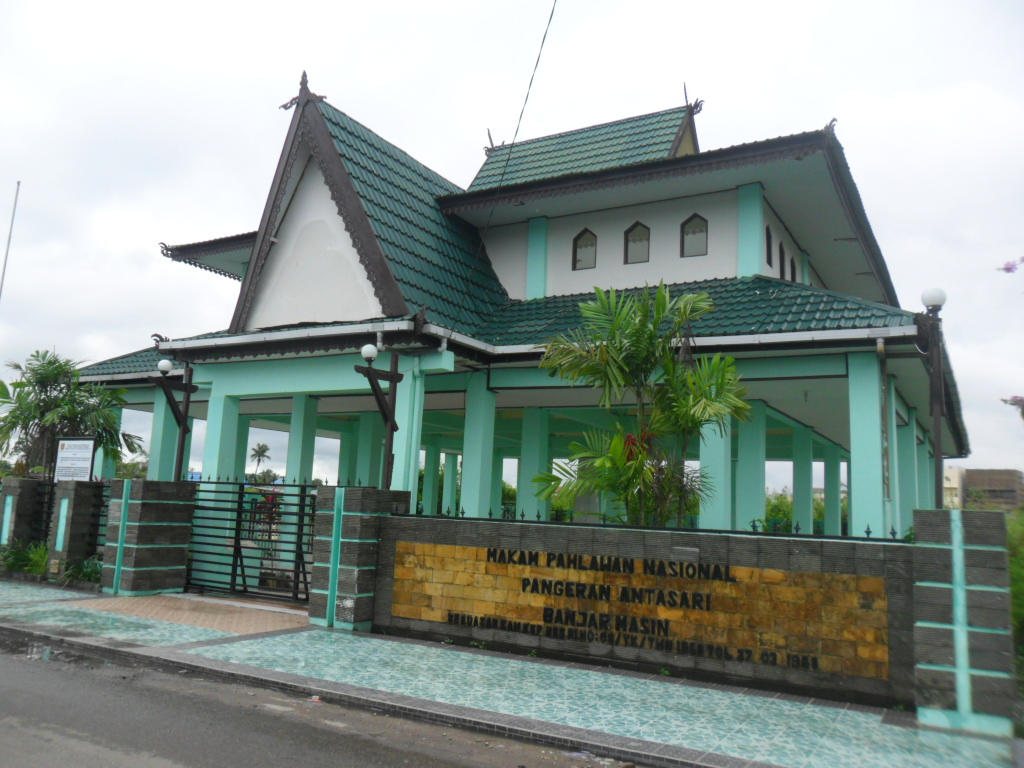
Antasari's burial site in Banjarmasin

In October 1862, Antasari was planning a big attack. However, an outbreak of smallpox led to his death on 11 October 1862. He was buried in Banjarmasin; and several other resistance leaders, from different periods, were later buried there; the place was later named the Antasari Heroes' Cemetery. After Antasari's death, his son, Muhammad Seman, continued his struggle against the Dutch. The resistance ended with Seman's death in 1905.

== Legacy ==
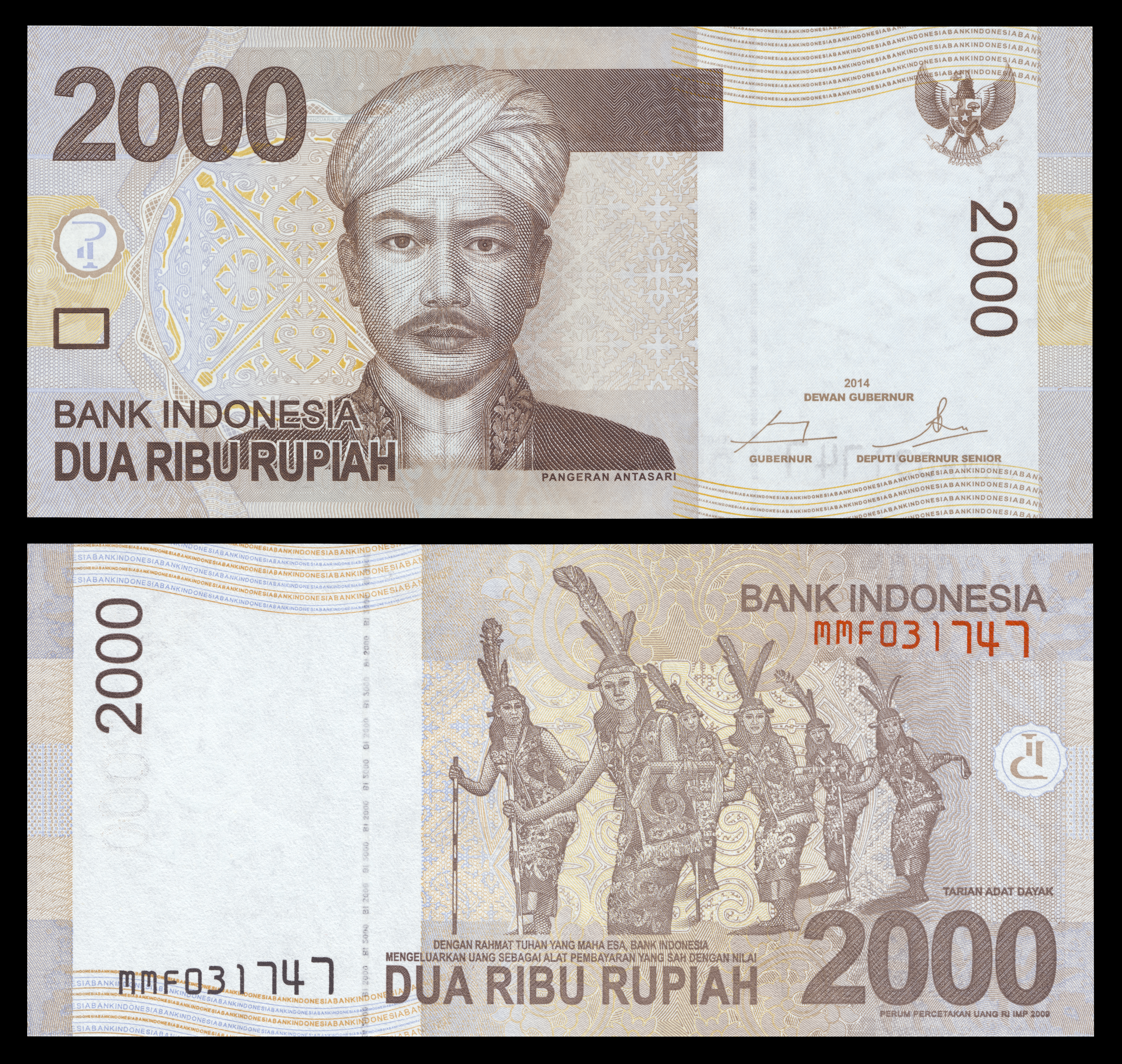
Antasari featured on a 2,000-rupiah banknote. Bornean dancers can be seen on the reverse.

Antasari was given the title 'Panembahan Amiruddin Khaliful Mukmin' on 14 March 1862 by his people, which made him a religious leader for his people. He was declared a National Hero of Indonesia in 1968 by President Suharto through presidential decree No. 06/TK/1968.

In the mid-1990s a documentary on Antasari's life was made. Antasari is featured on the obverse of the 2009 series 2,000 rupiah bill, which shows traditional Bornean dancers on the reverse.

== Bibliography ==
- Ajisaka, Arya (2008). Mengenal Pahlawan Indonesia (Revised ed.). Jakarta: Kawan Pustaka. ISBN 9789797572785.
- Komandoko, Gamal (2006). Kisah 124 Pahlawan dan Pejuang Nusantara. Yogyakarta: Pustaka Widyatama. ISBN 9789796610907.
- "Makam Pangeran Antasari" [Prince Antasari Graveyard]. Banjarmasin City Government. Archived from the original on 14 April 2012.
- Poesponegoro, Marwati Djoened; Notosusanto, Nugroho (2008). Kemunculan Penjajahan di Indonesia. Sejarah Nasional Indonesia. Vol. 4. Jakarta: Balai Pustaka. ISBN 9789794074107.
- Ricklefs, MC (2001). A History of Modern Indonesia since c. 1200 (3rd ed.). Stanford, California: Stanford University Press. ISBN 9780804744805.
- "Rp 2,000 bills most popular banknotes this season". The Jakarta Post. 8 September 2009. Archived from the original on 17 July 2014.
- Soedarmanto, J. B. (2007). Jejak-Jejak Pahlawan: Perekat Kesatuan Bangsa Indonesia. Jakarta: Grasindo. ISBN 9789797597160.
- Sudarman, Simon (22 January 2010). "Robert Germain Guilbert: Actor by accident". The Jakarta Post. Archived from the original on 4 March 2016.
