= Apilan and kota mara =

Structure for mounting cannons in Malay prahu

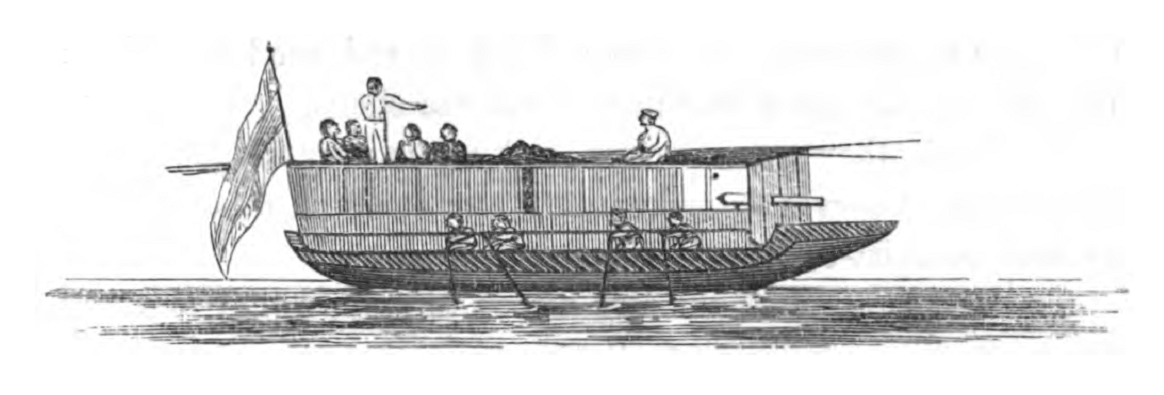
Malay prahu warboat (1863).

Apilan and kota mara are two Malay nautical terms which refer to the structure on a vessel where the cannon is installed. This term is used especially on Malay ships and boats.

== Apilan ==
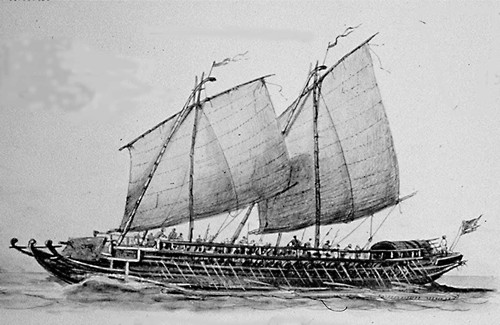
Iranun lanong warship with apilan mounting 2 guns.

Apilan (or ampilan) is the wooden gunshield found in Malay prahus where cannons are placed. It has a hole to place a long gun, and sometimes a swivel gun can be placed over the top of the apilan. An apilan is not permanent: it can be assembled, disassembled, and moved according to necessity. The crew of Malay prahu operated the long gun behind an apilan, which was usually situated at the bow of a prahu. This gun-shield was only put on when the ship went into action. Sunting apilan is the name given to two lelas or light guns standing on the gun-shield of a heavy gun.

=== Etymology ===
Apilan is a native Malay word, not descended from any foreign word. It is also a standalone word, because the syllable is api-lan instead of apil-an.

== Kota mara ==
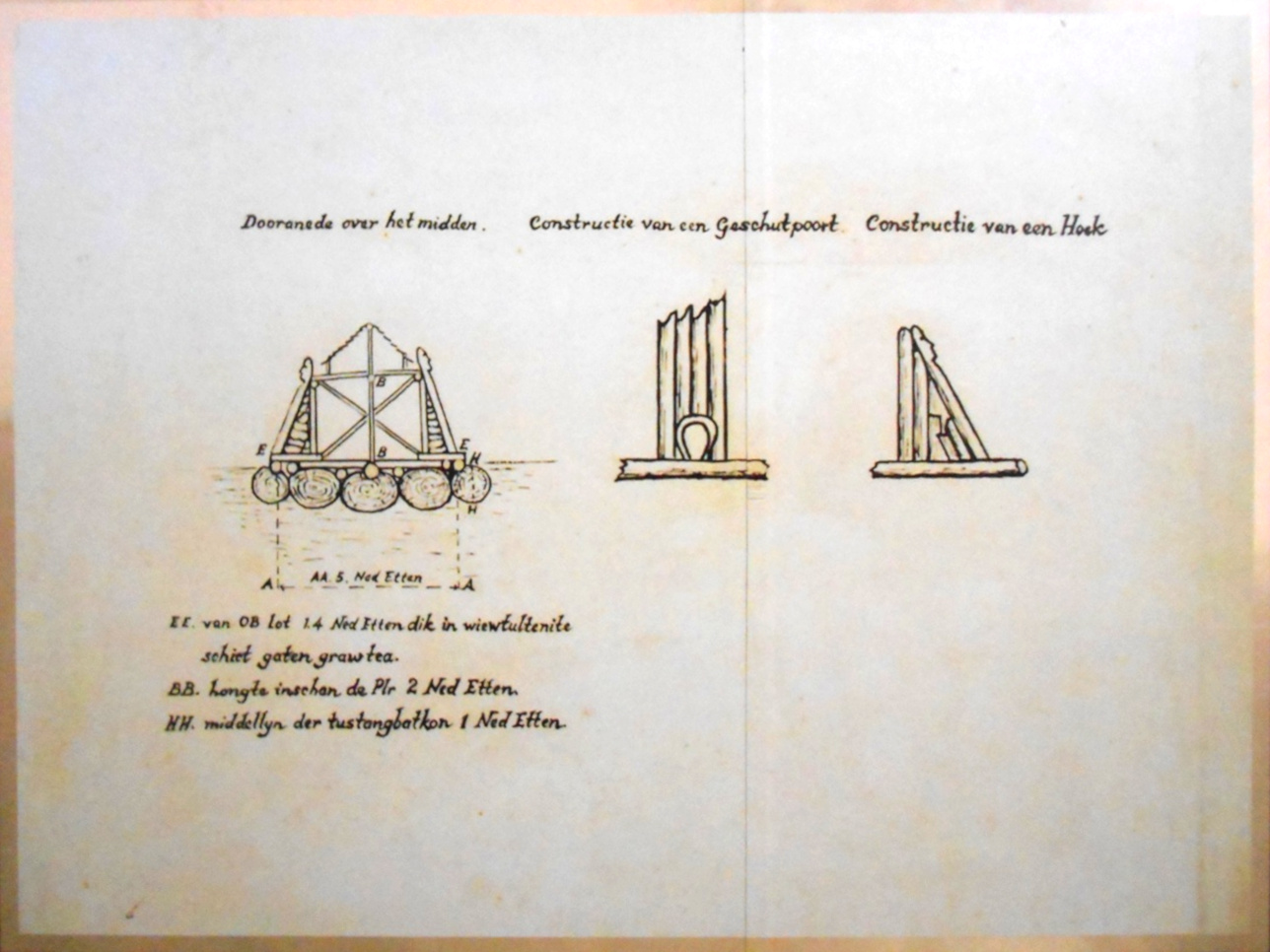
Sketch of a lanting kotta mara showing cross section across the center, construction of a firing hole, and the construction of a corner post.

Kota mara is the breastwork or casement of Malay prahus. The function is to protect the gunner. Contrary to apilan, the kota mara cannot be moved. It is the permanent bulwark of the battery in a Malay piratical ship. The term saga kota mara refers to a peculiar prop keeping the gun shield (apilan) in position. The word benteng is also used for this permanent breastwork. Ambong-ambong are blocks of wood forming part of the framework of the battery in a Malay piratical perahu. These blocks support the base of the benteng. The kota mara already existed since at least the 8th century A.D., being shown in Borobudur ship bas relief.

=== Etymology ===
The term comes from Malay word kota which in turn comes from the Sanskrit word कोट्ट (kota) which means fort, fortress, castle, fortified house, fortification, works, city, town, or place encircled by walls. The word mara may come from Malay word meaning "appear before", "forward", "come", "moved to the front", "forward", and "advanced". Thus it can be interpreted as "breastwork before a cannon" or "breastwork at the front". According to the Great Indonesian Dictionary (KBBI), kota mara means (1) Wall on a ship to protect men mounting the cannon (2) Terrace or wall over a castle which a cannon is mounted. According to H. Warington Smyth, kota mara means transverse deck bulkhead at stem and stern (of a ship). Benteng itself means fort, battery, or redoubt.

== Example on records ==
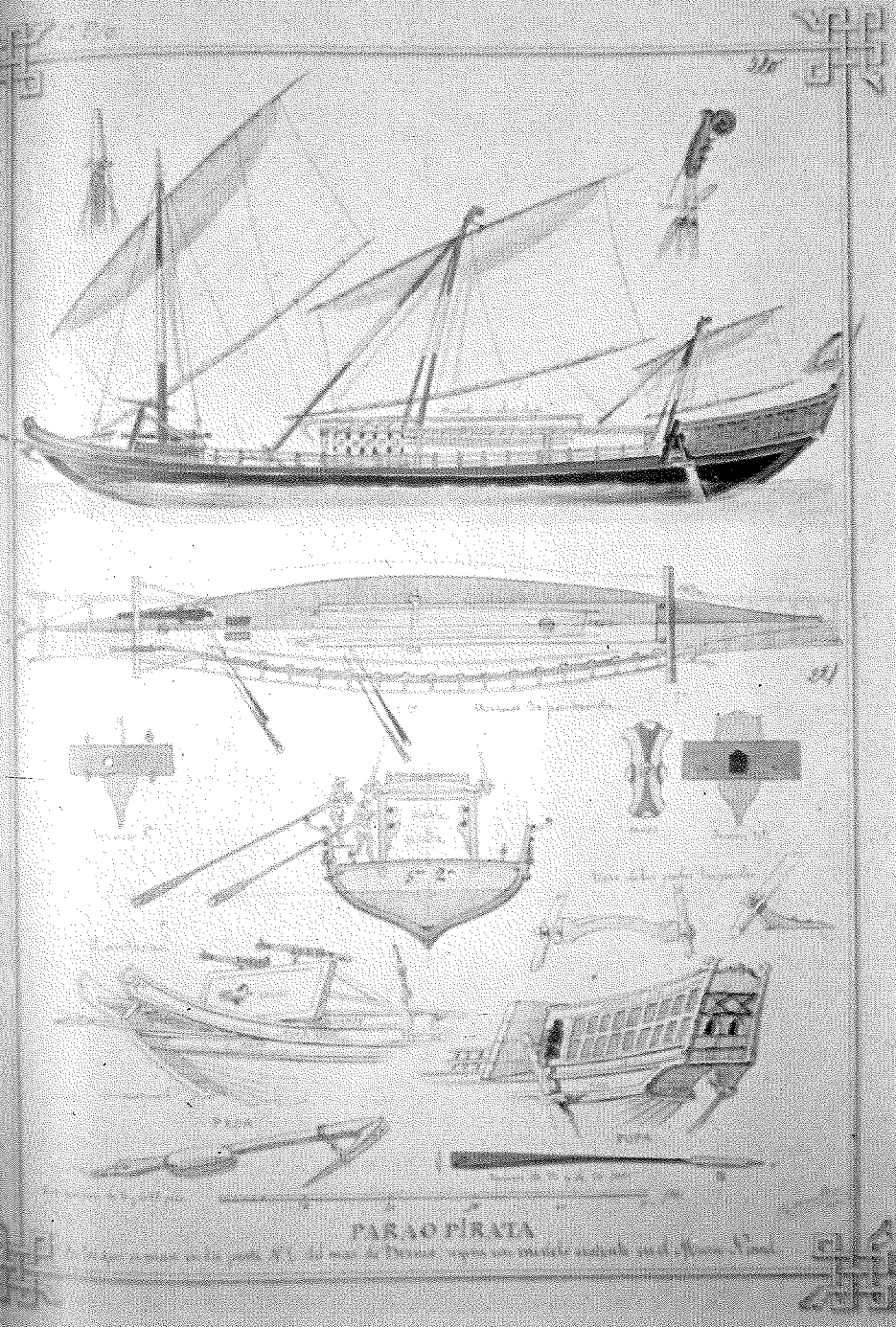
Detail of a lanong. Apilan and sunting apilan can be seen.

Singapore resident John Crawfurd recorded Malay piracy near Singapore waters. The Malay pirate ships of the time were 40–50 feet (12–15 m) long with 15-foot (4.6 m) beam. The decks were made of split nibong wood. Smaller pirate craft put up thick plank bulwarks [apilan] when fighting, while larger ones like those of the Lanun people had bamboo ledges hanging over their gunwales, with a protecting breastwork [kota mara] of plaited rattan about 3 feet (0.91 meters) high. A crew might consist of 20–30 men, augmented with oarsmen of captured slaves. Small craft would have nine oars per side; larger ones would be double-banked, with an upper tier of oarsmen seated on the bulwark projection hidden behind rattan breastwork. Pirate armament included a stockade near the bow, with iron or brass 4-pounders, and another stockade aft, generally with two swivel guns. They also might have four or five brass swivels, or rantaka, on each side. They have bamboo shields, and were armed with spears, keris, muskets and other firearms they could get.

H. H. Frese description of personal ship of the Sultan of Riau from 1883:

This fast and impressive ship is heavily armed to fend off pirates, a real danger at that time. Two heavy muzzle-loading brass guns mounted on carriages are placed on the foredeck pointing forward. A heavy shield, or apilan, for the protection of the gunners, is constructed of horizontal beams for which fresh wood had to be used to prevent dangerous splintering when hit by a ball or bullet.

— The Mariner's Mirror

Lieutenant T.J. Newbold record about the Malay pirate prahu:

The prahus used by Malay pirates are from eight to ten tons burthen, extremely well manned and remarkably fast, particularly with the paddles commonly used. They are generally armed with swivels on their bows, centre, and stern, of small calibre, but long range. When preparing to attack, strong bulwarks of wood called Apilans are erected, behind which the crew ensconce themselves, fighting with their long guns until their prey is disabled; or till the gong sound the signal for boarding.

— Journal of the Asiatic Society of Bengal, Volume 5

== See also ==
- Jong – Javanese sailing ship
- Malangbang – Indonesian medieval sailing ship
- Kotta mara – Floating fort from Borneo
- Lanong – Type of warship from the Philippines
- Bajak
- Salisipan
