= Surianshah of Banjar =

1st Sultan of Banjar (1526–1540)

Surianshah سوريان شاه
- Prince Jaya Sutera

Sultan of Banjar
- Reign: 1526 – 1540
- Coronation: 24 September 1526
- Predecessor: Himself (as King)
- Successor: Rahmatullah

King of Banjar
- Reign: 1520 – 1526
- Predecessor: Position established (Prince Tumenggung as king of Negara Daha)
- Successor: Himself (as Sultan)

Crown Prince of Negara Daha
- Reign: 1525 – 1526
- Born: Raden Raga Samudera; Negara Daha
- Died: 1540; Kuin, Sultanate of Banjar
- Burial: Sultan Surianshah Tomb Complex
- Spouses: Queen Sa'adah
- Issue: Prince Rahmatullah; Prince Dipati Anom
Regnal name
- توان كبوه دولي يڠ مها مليا ڤدوك سري سلطان سوريان الله شاه; Tuan Kebawah Duli Yang Maha Mulia Paduka Seri Sultan Suryanullah Shah
Posthumous name
- ڤانمبهان باتو هبنڬ; Panembahan Batu Habang سوسوهونن مات هبنڬ; Susuhunan Mata Habang
- House: Banjarmasin dynasty
- Father: Raden Mantri Alu
- Mother: Princess Intan Sari Galuh Baranakan
- Religion: Sunni Islam

Surianshah, also known as Suryanullah or Suria Angsa and Prince Jaya Sutera, was the founder of Kingdom of Banjar and first sultan of the Sultanate of Banjar who ruled from his coronation in 1520 until his death in 1540. He was probably the first Banjar ruler to embrace Islam.

== Early life ==
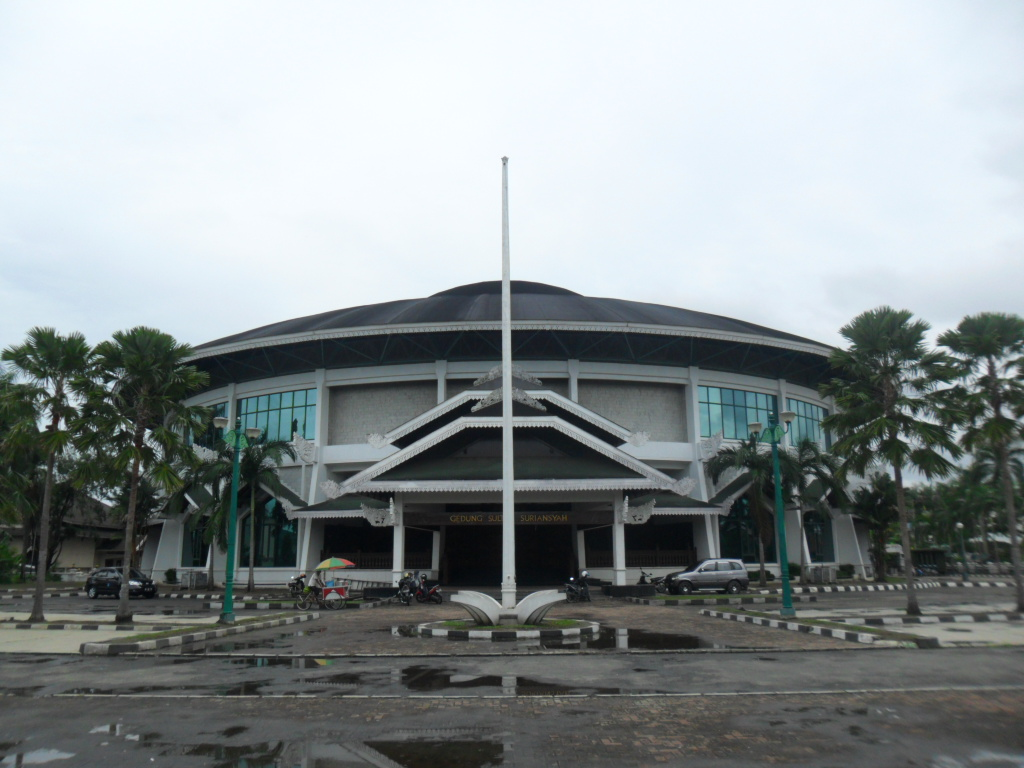
The meeting hall called the Sultan Surianshah Building in Banjarmasin.

Raden Samudera was the son of Puteri Galuh Beranakan (Queen Intan Sari), the daughter of Maharaja Sukarama from Negara Daha. And his father's name was Raden Mantri Alu, nephew of Maharaja Sukarama. The name "Surianshah" (in local writing: 'Suriansyah') is often used as a name for a boy in Banjar people.

According to the manuscript "The Story of the Heredity of the Kings of Banjar and Kotawaringin" aka "Hikayat Banjar Resension I", Surianshah was the 6th descendant of Lambung Mangkurat and also the 6th descendant of the couple Princess Junjung Buih and Maharaja Suryanata. Maharaja Suryanata was picked up from Majapahit as the match for Junjung Buih, the adopted sister of Lambung Mangkurat. Surianshah was also the 3rd descendant of Raden Sekar Sungsang.

=== Crown Prince of Negara Daha ===
The political legitimacy that emerged for the Banjar community was that a king or a candidate to replace the king must be the eldest son of the king born from a mother who was also of royal blood (putera gahara). This refers to the couple Suryanata and Junjung Buih as their idealization. The direct line descendants of the kings (in the Hindu conception) which also means the direct descendants of the nāgas (in the original religious conception), are believed to be the representatives of the gods on earth. This tradition in itself became a source of political legitimacy for every ruler who took turns on the throne. Although the Banjar Sultanate which emerged in the 16th century was an Islamic state, the political traditions inherited from the Dipa State era still strongly influenced the succession process, and this rule was also well understood by Maharaja Sukarama, the second king of Negara Daha.

It is told in the Hikayat Banjar, Maharaka Sukarama had four wives and four sons and one daughter. They were respectively Prince Mangkubumi, Prince Tumenggung, Prince Bagalung, Prince Jayadewa, and the youngest daughter named Princess Galuh Baranakan. The four wives of the king apparently were not of noble blood, so the king married Princess Galuh Baranakan to his own brother's son, Raden Bagawan, whose name was Raden Mantri Alu. This couple, Galuh and Mantri then gave birth to Raden Samudera. Because he was pure-blooded, Sukarama considered Raden Samudera to be more entitled to inherit the throne of Daha than the others. Even though his children opposed their father's decision, Sukamara still insisted that Raden Samudera was the heir to the throne.

After the death of Sukarama, Prince Mangkubumi and Prince Tumanggung, who wanted the throne, tried to get rid of Prince Samudera. This then triggered a civil war that brought the Kingdom of Negara Daha to its collapse.

== Reign ==
=== Accession ===
To avenge his uncles, Prince Samudera slowly gathered power, until finally he was recognized by a number of village chiefs downstream of the Barito River, and made the river the base of his power. By the village chiefs, he was appointed King in 1520.

On September 24, 1526 (6 Zulhijjah 932 H), Prince Samudera converted to Islam and chose the title Sultan Suryanullah Shah, from the words surya (sun) and shah (king) which are adapted to the title of Raden Putra (Rahadyan Putra) namely Suryanata, a founder of a dynasty during the previous Hindu kingdom. After his accession, he managed to defeat his rivals and became the sole ruler of Banjar.

=== Administrative policies ===
When Surianshah first ruled the kingdom, Patih Masih, one of the high officials of the State of Daha, served as Mangkubumi. He then formed the Four Patihs (Patih Ampat), which were held by the heads of the Barito villages who had supported him. Surianshah made Patih Masih to manage the Four Patihs consisting of four deputies:

1. The deputy of Pangiwa is held by the Patih of Balit
2. The deputy for Panganan is held by the Patih of Balitung
3. The deputy of Gampiran is held by the Patih of Kuin
4. The deputy for Panumping is held by the Patih of Muhur

Under Gampiran and Panumping there are 30 Mantri regions. These four deputies also have the authority as judges.

After the fall of the Negara Daha Kingdom, the oldest patih, Aria Taranggan was appointed as Mangkubumi with the authority to handle state administrative matters throughout the country, determine the final decision regarding someone sentenced to death, and determine the right to confiscate all property of the person sentenced.

The four deputies also have the authority as prosecutors and judges, but all their decisions are based on a legal codification called Kutara which was drawn up by Aria Taranggana when he served as Mangkubumi Negara Daha.

In addition, Surianshah also formed a number of ministries:

- Mantri Bandar or Kiai Palabuhan who is tasked with carrying out the collection of port customs duties.
- Mantri Tuhabun whose job is to serve the king, the king's family, such as, among other things, the team paddling the king's speed boat.
- Singabana, the ministry of defense and security which is each headed by two functions: Singantaka and Singapati.
- Great Mantri, who served as ambassadors and royal envoys within the country and abroad.

=== Military expansion ===
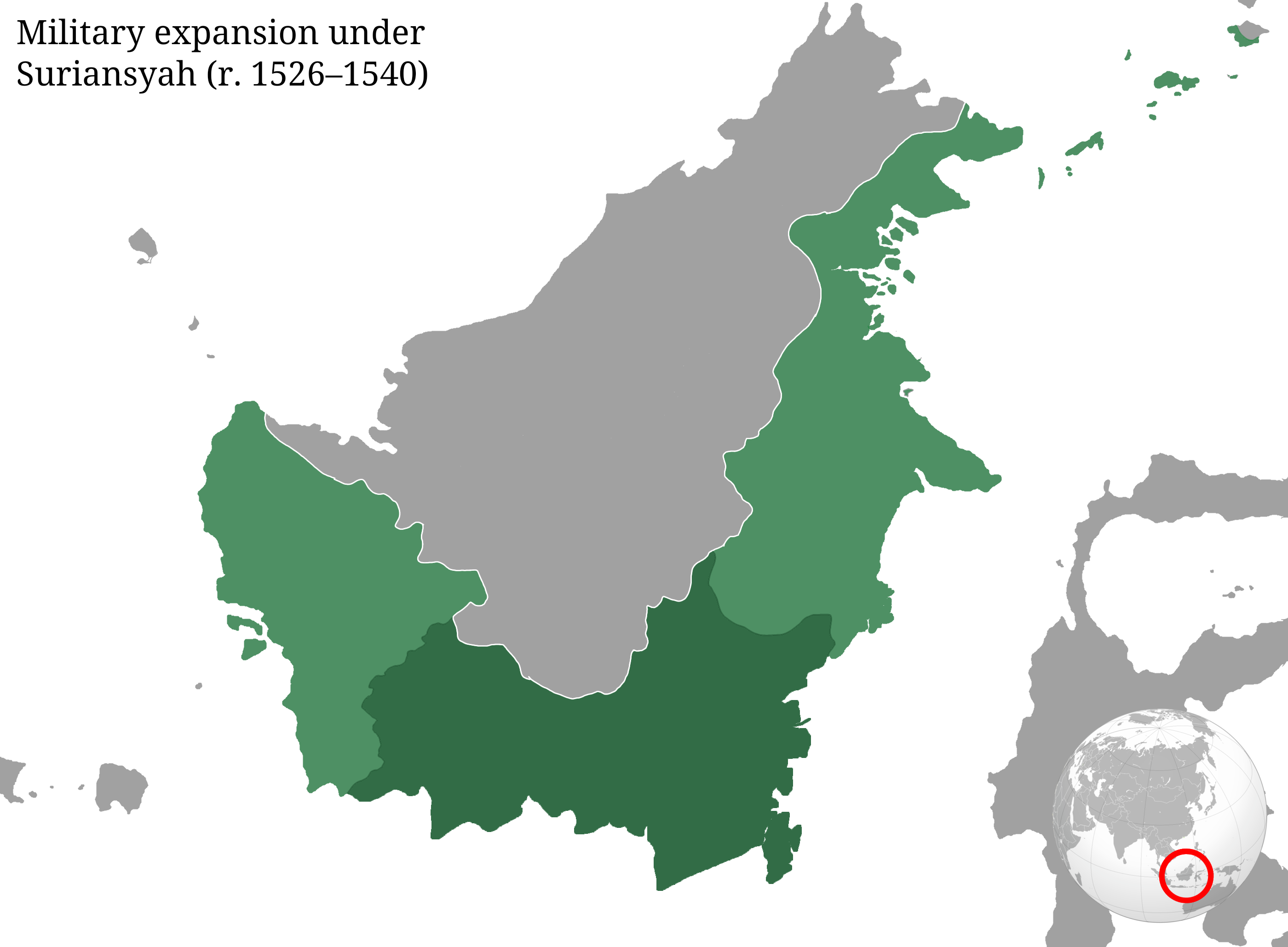
Banjar during military expansion by Surianshah.

Surianshah modified the military system for the sake of territorial expansion. Since his coronation in 1526, Banjar experienced a significant territorial expansion. The areas that were conquered during Surianshah's reign are mentioned in Hikayat Banjar:

Sudah itu maka orang Sebangau, orang Mendawai, orang Sampit, orang Pambuang, orang Kuta Waringin, orang Sukadana, orang Lawai, orang Sambas sekaliannya itu dipersalin sama disuruh kembali. Tiap-tiap musim barat sekaliannya negeri itu datang mahanjurkan upetinya, musim timur kembali itu. Dan orang Takisung, orang Tambangan Laut, orang Kintap, orang Asam-Asam, orang Laut-Pulau, orang Pamukan, orang Paser, orang Kutai, orang Berau, orang Karasikan, sekaliannya itu dipersalin, sama disuruh kembali. Tiap-tiap musim timur datang sekaliannya negeri itu mahanjurkan upetinya, musim barat kembali.
After that, the Sebangau people, the Mendawei people, the Sampit people, the Pembuang people, the Kotawaringin people, the Sukadana people, the Lawai people, and the Sambas people, they came one after another. Every western season they come to pay tribute, then the eastern season comes. Then the Takisung people, the Tambangan Laut people, the Kintap people, the Asam-Asam people, the Laut-Pulau people, the Pamukan people, the Paser people, the Kutai people, the Berau people, the Karasikan people, they came one after another. Every eastern season, they come to pay tribute, and the western season comes again.

== Death ==
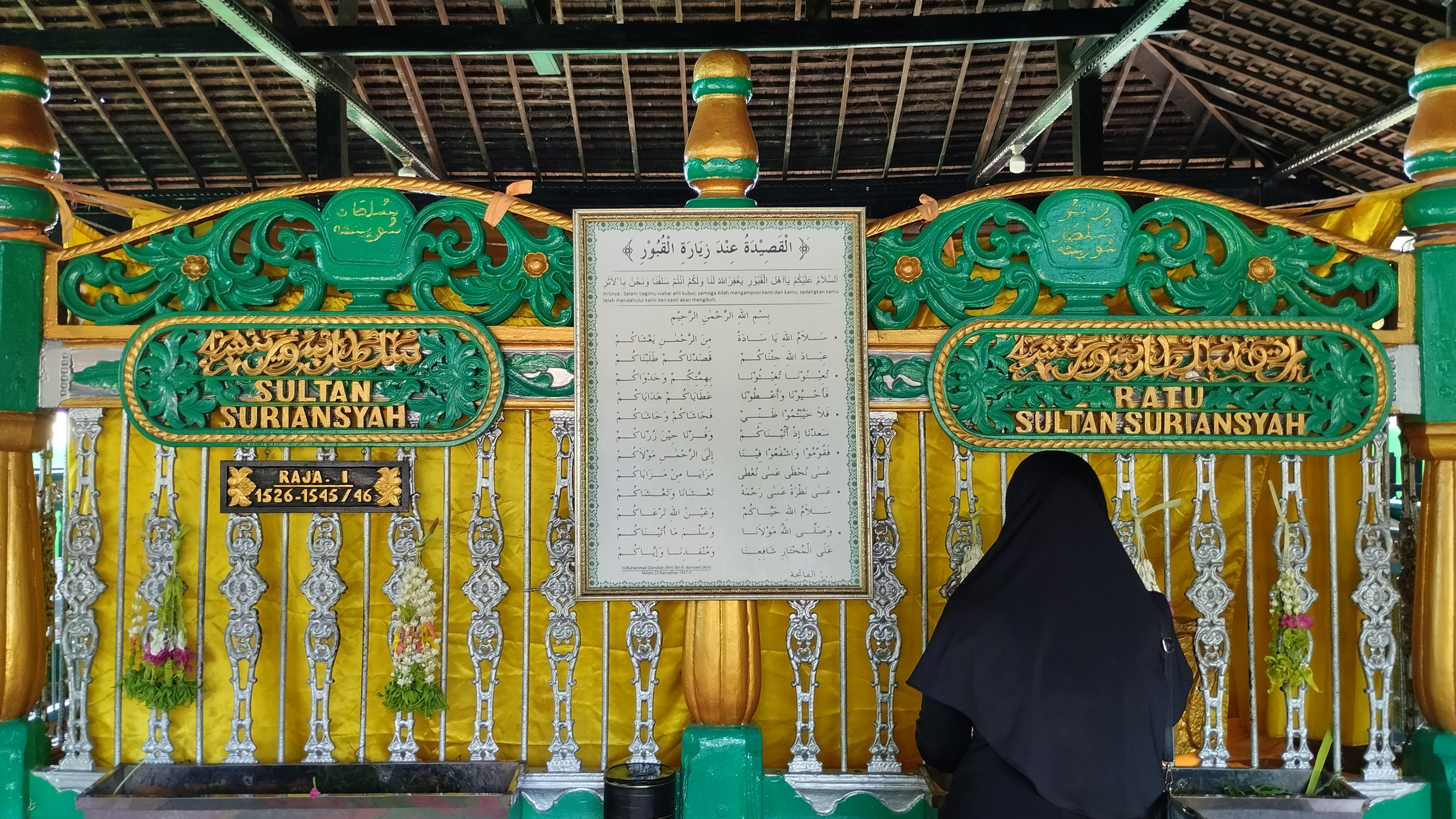
Tomb of Surianshah and his wife.

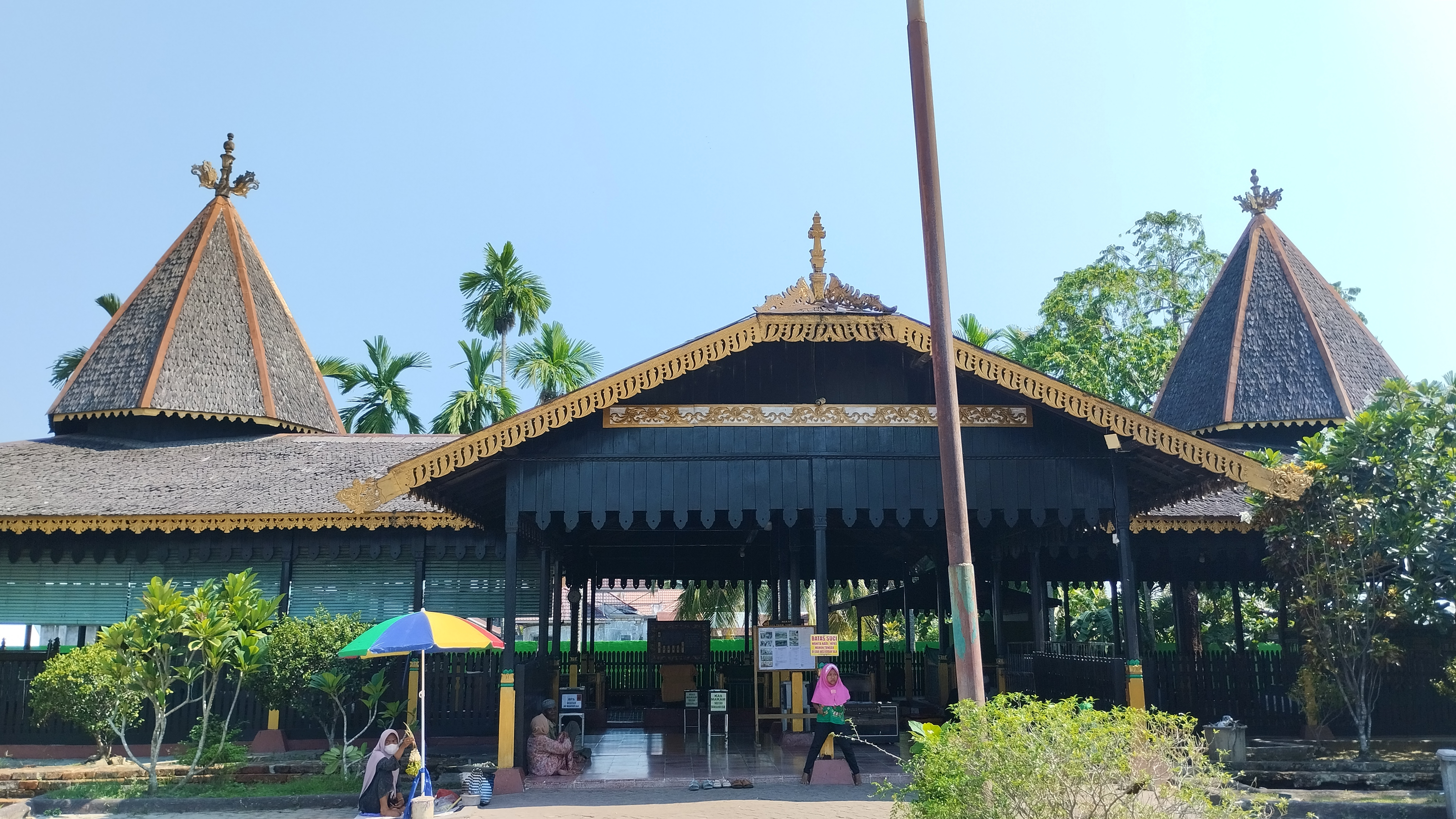
Building of the Tomb Complex of Sultan Surianshah.

Sultan Suryanullah is estimated to have died in 1540 or 1546, as written on his tombstone. After his death, the sultan received the posthumous title Panembahan Batu Habang and Susuhunan Batu Habang, named after the color of the red bricks (habang) covering his grave in the Sultan Surianshah Tomb Complex in Old Banjar, now North Kuin, South Kalimantan.

== Legacy ==
The date of Surianshah's coronation, September 24, 1526, is commemorated as the Anniversary of Banjarmasin, approximately 499 years ago.

Political offices
Preceded by Position established Prince Tumenggung as king of Negara Daha	Sultan of Banjar; September 1526 –1540	Succeeded by Rahmatullah of Banjar
