= Nan Sarunai =

- 1309–1389
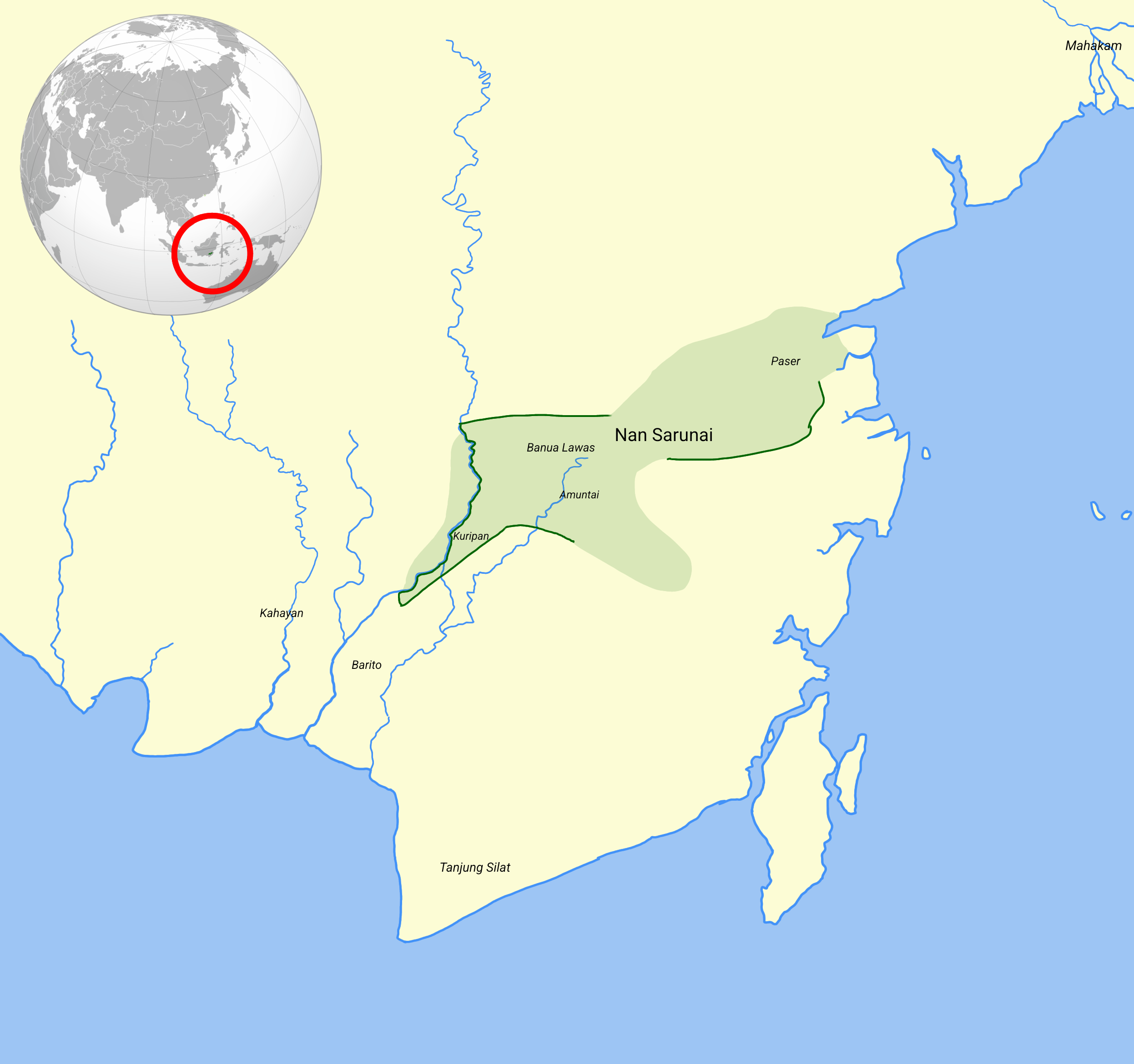
- Modern approximation of the location of Nan Sarunai in today's South Kalimantan, centered in present-day North Hulu Sungai Regency
- Status: Independent state (1309–1354); Vassal of Majapahit (1354–1389)
- Capital: Kota Raden; Banua Lawas
- Common languages: Janyawai language
- Religion: Kaharingan
- Government: Monarchy
- King
  - 1309–1329: Raden Japutra Layar
  - 1329–1349: Raden Neno
  - 1349–1355: Raden Anyan
- History
  - Established: 1309
  - Disestablished: 1389
- Currency: Gold coins, silver coins, kepeng, gobog coins
Succeeded by
Negara Dipa; Majapahit Empire
- Today part of: Indonesia

Nan Sarunai was an ancient civilization and kingdom established by the Maanyan people, a subgroup of the Dayak people in what is now South Kalimantan, Indonesia. It played a foundational role in the historical development of the Banjar people and preceded later kingdoms such as Negara Dipa and Banjar Sultanate.

The Maanyan people are part of the Ot Danum or Ngaju Dayak subgroup and originally inhabited eastern Barito areas in present-day Central Kalimantan. They were once formidable seafarers. Remarkably, linguistic and genetic studies suggest links between the Maanyan and the Malagasy people of Madagascar, indicating ancient oceanic voyages around 600 CE.

However, their maritime lifestyle faded due to sedimentation in the Barito Delta, causing them to migrate inland. These environmental changes and subsequent migration helped shape the demographic and cultural development in areas like Amuntai and Tanjung, which eventually became centers of power in later kingdoms.

Nan Sarunai is recognized as the foundational link in the historical lineage that led to the rise of Negara Dipa, Negara Daha, and eventually the Banjar Sultanate. It stands as a testament to early Dayak statecraft, maritime capability, and cultural sophistication in pre-Islamic Kalimantan.

== History ==
The Banjar people are one of the major ethnic groups in South Kalimantan. However, the identity of the region's original inhabitants has been debated due to its diverse ethnic composition. The term "Urang Banjar" (lit. 'Banjar people') is commonly used to refer to the majority population, which includes both Malay and Dayak ancestry, particularly the Maanyan people.

=== Origins and etymology ===
"Nan Sarunai" is believed to mean 'the famous one' or may derive from "Sarunai", a traditional flute-like musical instrument played by the Dayak Maanyan, often during ceremonies and dances. "Nan" may originate from Malay influence, making "Nan Sarunai" a poetic reference to a musical and culturally rich kingdom.

=== Foundation ===
Nan Sarunai emerged as a proto-state governed by the Dayak Maanyan people around 1309 CE. It was likely centered near present-day Amuntai and Tanjung, along the Tabalong River — a tributary of the Barito River. Some scholars identify Nan Sarunai with other historical entities such as the Kingdoms of Kuripan, Tanjungpuri, and Tabalong, though others assert these were separate polities, such as Tanjungpuri being associated with Srivijaya exiles from Palembang.

Nan Sarunai represents the early phase of political development among the Banjar people, classified as a tribal state — dominated by a single ethnic group with leadership based on customary law.

=== Invasion and decline ===
According to oral traditions, particularly the wadian chants, Nan Sarunai fell after a tragic invasion by the Majapahit empire under the command of Mpu Nala in the mid-14th century. The Negarakertagama (1365) refers to this region as "Tanjung Negara". The destruction of Nan Sarunai marks the transition into the vassalage under Majapahit and the rise of the successor of Negara Dipa.

=== Evidence of Nan Sarunai's existence ===
Scientific and proportional references regarding the history of the Nan Sarunai remain scarce due to its antiquity. Existing sources are largely oral traditions, chiefly found in the Hikayat Banjar (lit. 'Banjar Tales'). The historiography of Indonesia, particularly concerning traditional polities, heavily relies on traditional narratives such as babad, hikayat, or folklore. These traditional forms are often ethnocentric, monarch-centric, and anthropocentric (Sartono Kartodirdjo, 1993:7). Information from the Hikayat Banjar reflects mysticism, legend, and a lack of chronological accuracy. The Hikayat Banjar comprises 4,787 lines or 120 pages. However, much of its content focuses on post-Nan Sarunai kingdoms such as Negara Dipa, Negara Daha, and the Banjar Sultanate. Nan Sarunai is only briefly mentioned, particularly in its decline. The Nan Sarunai narrative within the Hikayat Banjar more closely resembles the oral traditions of the Dayak Maanyan people (e.g., wadian chants) that have been passed down generationally. According to oral traditions, the Dayak Maanyan once had a tribal state called Nan Sarunai. Wadian songs recount the tragic fall of Nan Sarunai to the Majapahit empire around the 13th century.

There are two versions of the Hikayat Banjar. The first was revised during the Islamic Banjar Sultanate period, and the second is considered from the Hindu-influenced Negara Dipa period. This analysis explains why Nan Sarunai receives limited attention: the narrative focus shifts to Negara Dipa, which emerged after Nan Sarunai's fall.

Nan Sarunai is believed to be an ancient polity predating the Common Era. Supporting this are archaeological findings believed to originate from that time. Notably, a temple discovered in Amuntai is linked to Nan Sarunai. Amuntai is a likely settlement of the Dayak Maanyan people, considered the founders of Nan Sarunai civilization. In 1996, the temple underwent testing, with charcoal samples dated to 242–226 BCE. If accurate, this makes Nan Sarunai older than the Kutai Martadipura Kingdom (5th century CE), long believed to be the oldest in the archipelago.

If the archaeological date is correct, Nan Sarunai had a prolonged existence, as the kingdom fell in 1362 CE. However, the early form of the kingdom was likely rudimentary. Its administrative center likely shifted across what is now Hulu Sungai Utara and Tabalong regencies, centered along the Tabalong River. Oral lore states the Maanyan ancestors once lived in a mist-covered place called Margoni, possibly a symbolic or mythical representation of a heavenly realm.

Early Dayak Maanyan settlements included Tumpuk Lalung Kuwung, Gumi Rarak Ransai, Pupur Purumatung, and Sida Matung. Their administrative center was eventually established at Lili Kumeah by Datu Sialing and Damung Gamiluk Langit.

=== Royal lineage ===
Nan Sarunai's extensive history is poorly documented, especially regarding its rulers. Only a few names survive, notably Datu Sialing and Datu Gamiluk Langit, thought to have led the Dayak Maanyan and served as Nan Sarunai's kings. It is unclear whether they ruled jointly or successively. They led a migration to a more prosperous settlement, eventually founding Nan Sarunai's capital at Lili Kumeah. In 1309 CE, Raden Japutra Layar became king (1309–1329 CE). His title "Raden" suggests influence from Majapahit, where he was previously a merchant.

Raden Japutra Layar is the first historically recorded ruler. He likely marked the beginning of a centralized and more organized state. His successors were Raden Neno (1329–1349) and Raden Anyan (1349–1355), the latter being the last ruler before Nan Sarunai fell to Majapahit.

=== Governance ===
The early governmental system remains unclear. Initially, several Dayak Maanyan communities held localized power, later unified under Nan Sarunai. The polity is considered a "primitive state", lacking tyrannical rule or administrative bureaucracy (Georges Balandier, 1986:192).

Nan Sarunai society was homogeneous, regulated by customary laws, and built on genealogical relationships (ipulaksanai meaning 'connected by intestines'). The king held the highest authority as tribal and governmental leader, with a patrimonial system where leadership was inherited. The kingdom was administered from a stilted longhouse known as Rumah Betang or Rumah Lamin, serving as the royal palace. Distinctively, this palace had a cross-shaped design.

For centuries, governance remained simple until 1309, when a more developed administration emerged under Raden Japutra Layar. Titles influenced by Majapahit included raden (king), and others like patih, uria, damong, pating'i, and datu for nobility.

== Territory ==
The areas under the rule of Nan Sarunai included much of what is now the administrative region of Hulu Sungai Utara Regency and Tabalong Regency in the province of South Kalimantan. It is estimated that Nan Sarunai's territory extended broadly from Tabalong to the Paser region. The Dayak Maanyan people, after establishing Nan Sarunai, often moved from one settlement to another, though they remained located near the Tabalong River and the Meratus Mountains.

Several places served as both settlement areas for the Dayak Maanyan people and as parts of Nan Sarunai's domain. These include: Tumpuk Lalung Kuwung Gumi Rarak Ransai, Tumpuk Pupur Purumatung, Tumpuk Sida Matung, Tumpuk Laliku Meah, Pulau Hujung Tanah, Kuripan, Margoni, Sinobala, and Lalung Nyawung.

In addition, there were other locations historically used as settlements by the Dayak Maanyan people, such as Gunung Rumung, Katuping Balah, Wamman Sabuku, Patukangan, Labuhan Amas, Bakumpai Lawas, Abun Alas, Muara Binsu, Danau Salak Dangka Nangki, Kupang Sunung, Danaukien, Tuntang Alu, and Baras Ruku.

== See also ==
- Majapahit invasion of Nan Sarunai

== Bibliography ==
- Balandier, Georges, 1986. Antropologi politik. Jakarta: Rajawali.
- Bani Noor Muchamad, et.a/., 2006. "Melacak arsitektur Keraton Banjar", dalam Dimensi Teknik Arsitektur', No. 34, No. 2, Desember 2006.
- Dwi Putro Sulaksono, 2008. Determinisme dan perubahan kebudayaan: Studi antropologi Dayak desa hutan Kalimantan. Banjarbaru, Kalimantan Selatan. Banjarbaru: Scripta Cendikia.
- Harry Widianto & Handini, "Eskavasi Situs Gua Babi Tahap V Kabupaten Tabalong Provinsi Kalimantan Selatan", dalam Laporan penelitian arkeologi Banjarmasin, 1999/2000.
- Fridolin Ukur, 1977, Tanya Jawab tentang Suku Dayak. Jakarta: BPK Gunung Mulia.
- Harry Widianto, et.al., "Ekskavasi Situs Gua Babi di Kabupaten Tabalong Provinsi Kalimantan Selatan", dalam Berita Penelitian Antropologi, No. 1, 1997, Balai Arkeologi Banjarmasin.
- Munoz, Paul Michel, 2006. Early kingdoms of the Indonesian archipelago and the Malay peninsula. Singapura: Edition Didier Millet.
- Ras, Johannes Jacobus, 1968. Hikayat Banafiar: A study in Malay historiography. S'Gravenhage: N.V. De nederlandsche Boeken Steendrukkerij v/h H.L. Smits.
- Sartono Kartodirdjo, 1993, "Historiografi tradisional, model, fungsi, dan struktumya, dalam Makalah Simposium Intemasional Ilmu Humaniora I, Fakultas Sastra Universitas Gadjah Mada Yogyakarta.
- vida Pervaya Rusianti Kusmartono & Harry Widianto, 1998. "Ekskavasi Situs Candi Agung Kabupaten North Upper Coarse, South Kalimantan", dalam Berita Penelitian Arkeologi, 02/1998. Banjarmasin: Hall Arkeologi Banjarmasin.
- Vida Pervaya Rusianti Kusmartono, "Pemerintahan early state Negara Dipa di Kalimantan Selatan. Makalah disampaikan dalam Pertemuan Ilmiah Arkeologi IX dan Kongres IAAI 2002, Kediri, 23-27 Juli 2002.
- Yusuf Hidayat, "Politik identitas: Dari identitas lokal menuju identitas nasional", dalam Jurnal Sosiologi Universitas Airlangga, Volume 2, No 1, 2006.
