= Majapahit invasion of Nan Sarunai =

Majapahit invasions of Nan Sarunai
Date	1355–1362
Location	South Kalimantan (modern-day Indonesia)
Result	Majapahit victory
Territorial changes	Negara Dipa was established by Empu Jatmika as a vassal of Majapahit

Belligerents
Majapahit Empire	Nan Sarunai

Commanders and leaders
Hayam Wuruk; Mpu Jatmika; Aria Megatsari; Tatah Jiwa; Wiramartas †; Mpu Nala (WIA)	Raden Anyan †; Jamuhala †; Prince Jarang; Prince Indol

Casualties and losses
Heavy	Unknown

Majapahit ruler Hayam Wuruk launched an invasion to Nan Sarunai from 1355 to 1362. Battles occurred and the Majapahit defeated and ended the Nan Sarunai while his commander, Mpu Jatmika, established his own kingdom there, the Negara Dipa, and ruled as a tributary of the Majapahit.

The extent of Majapahit influence according to the Nagarakṛtāgama

== Battle ==
In 1355, Hayam Wuruk of Majapahit launched an invasion to Dayak Ma'anyan kingdom of Nan Sarunai, led by Raden Anyan (Datu Tatuyan Wulau Miharaja Papangkat Amas). The invasion was commanded by Empu Jatmika from Kalingga and Kediri, with his team including advisor Aria Megatsari, general Tumenggung Tatah Jiwa, and minister Wiramartas. The first battle, fought in April 1358 at Tambak Wasi, resulted in the death of Nan Sarunai's captain, Jamuhala, and the Majapahit forces suffering heavy casualties. Princes Jarang and Idong fled to Man near the Tabalong-Kiwa River, and Nan Sarunai soldiers regrouped in Pulau Kadap for the second battle, which occurred in December 1362.

The second battle ended with the death of Raden Anyan at the hands of Mpu Nala, and he was buried in Banua Lawas. Following their defeat, Empu Jatmika established the Hindu kingdom of Negara Dipa, which became a tributary of Majapahit and eventually evolved into the Banjar kingdom. Survivors, including soldiers and artisans from various regions such as Java, Dayak, Madura, and Bugis, settled in areas like Amuntai, Alabio, and Nagara. These historical events are preserved in the Dayak Ma'anyan poetry known as Nansarunai Usak Jawa.
