= Hidayatullah I of Banjar =

3rd Sultan of Banjar

Hidayatullah I هداية الله ١
- Susuhunan
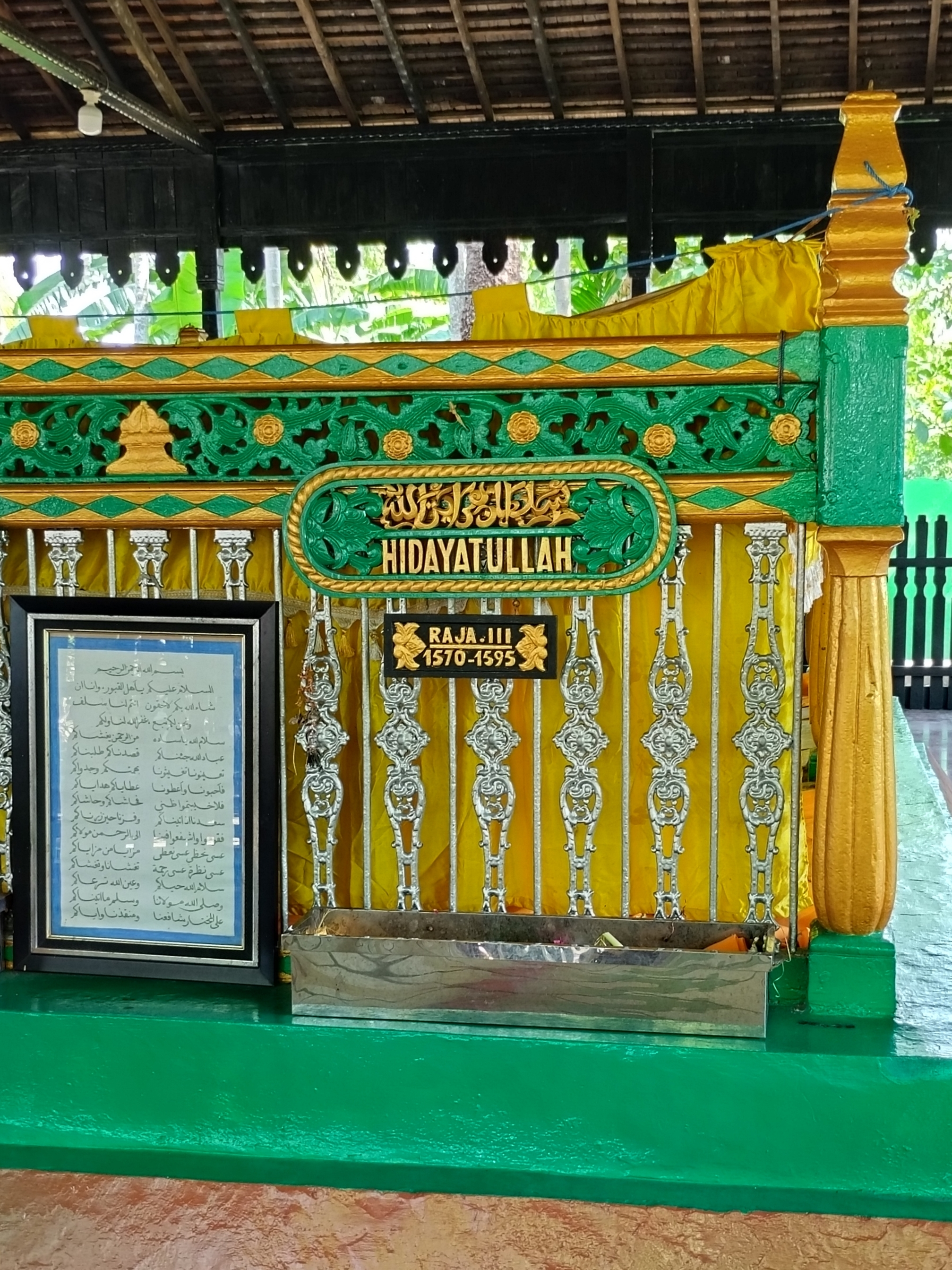
- Tomb of Hidayatullah I in the Sultan Surianshah Tomb Complex.

Sultan of Banjar
- Reign: 1570–1595
- Predecessor: Rahmatullah
- Successor: Musta'in Billah
- Born: Kuin, Banjarmasin, Banjar Sultanate
- Died: 1595; Banjar Sultanate
- Burial: Sultan Surianshah Tomb Complex
- Spouses: Putri Nur Alam binti Pangeran di-Laut; Puteri Tuan Khatib Banun; Puteri Kiai Di-Podok
- Issue: List: Raden Senapati; Raden Soeboe Subamanggala; Ratoe Bagoes; Raden Rangga Kesoema; Putri Hayu; Raden Aria Papati; Raden Aria Panular; Raden Aria Sagara; Raden Aria Waningpati; Raden Kalayar; Raden Panangguk; Raden Sumandi; Raden Pambayun; Raden Patampika; Raden Kakabun; Gusti Hajang; Gusti Nurani; Gusti Cangkuk; Gusti Busu; Gusti Nurasat
Regnal name
- توان كبوه دولي يڠ مها مليا ڤدوك سري سلطان هداية الله سونن باتو إيرانڬ; Tuan Kebawah Duli Yang Maha Mulia Paduka Seri Sultan Hidayatullah Sunan Batu Irang
Posthumous name
- ڤانمبهان باتو هيرڠ; Panembahan Batu Hirang; سوسوهونن باتو هيرڠ; Susuhunan Batu Hirang
- House: Dinasti Banjarmasin
- Father: Rahmatullah
- Religion: Sunni Islam

Hidayatullah I was the third Sultan of Banjar who ruled from 1570 until his death in 1595, he succeeded his father, Rahmatullah of Banjar. During his reign, Hidayatullah I was assisted by Kiai Anggadipa, a brilliant Banjar mangkubumi.

== Early life ==
Hidayatullah I was the 8th descendant of Lambung Mangkurat and also the 8th descendant of the couple Puteri Junjung Buih and Maharaja Suryanata. Maharaja Suryanata was picked up from Majapahit as the match for Puteri Junjung Buih, Lambung Mangkurat's adopted brother.

According to Buku 323 Sejarah Dinasti Qing, the sons and daughters of Sultan Hidayatullah I numbered 31 people who were still alive at the time of the visit of Chinese junk traders because all the children of the Sultan numbered 40 according to the Hikayat Banjar. The eldest son, Prince Senapati, succeeded him as Sultan of Banjar. The other child was Gusti Nurasat who married Sorang with the title Nanang Sarang, a warlord from the Biaju tribe. Hidayatullah I had two brothers, namely Prince Demang and Raden Zakaria.

== Reign (1570–1595) ==
Hidayatullah I ruled after succeeding his father, Rahmatullah, who died due to old age. With the help of Kiai Anggadipa, the brilliant Mangkubumi, his government expanded the territory of power, especially in the interior such as Biaju and Belajau. In the first half of his reign, the pepper trade began to develop in Banjar. During his reign, Islam grew rapidly in Kalimantan, this is evidenced by the construction of many mosques and surau in the conquered areas and the interior. He also married the daughter of Khatib Banun, a minister of the Banjar Sultanate who came from the Biaju circle.

Around the latter half of his reign, there was a political conflict between the Dayak Biaju and Banjar ethnic group. At that time, political dominance was held by the Biaju ethnic group, under the leadership of a Biaju Muslim empress, the daughter of Khatib Banun, a Biaju figure. When Hidayatullah I died, his son Mustain Billah, who was the son of a Biaju empress, succeeded in coming to power with the help of his ethnic group, through the elimination and murder of his political opponents.

== See also ==
- Hidayatullah II of Banjar
