= Rahmatullah of Banjar =

Rahmatullah رحمة الله
- Susuhunan Banjar
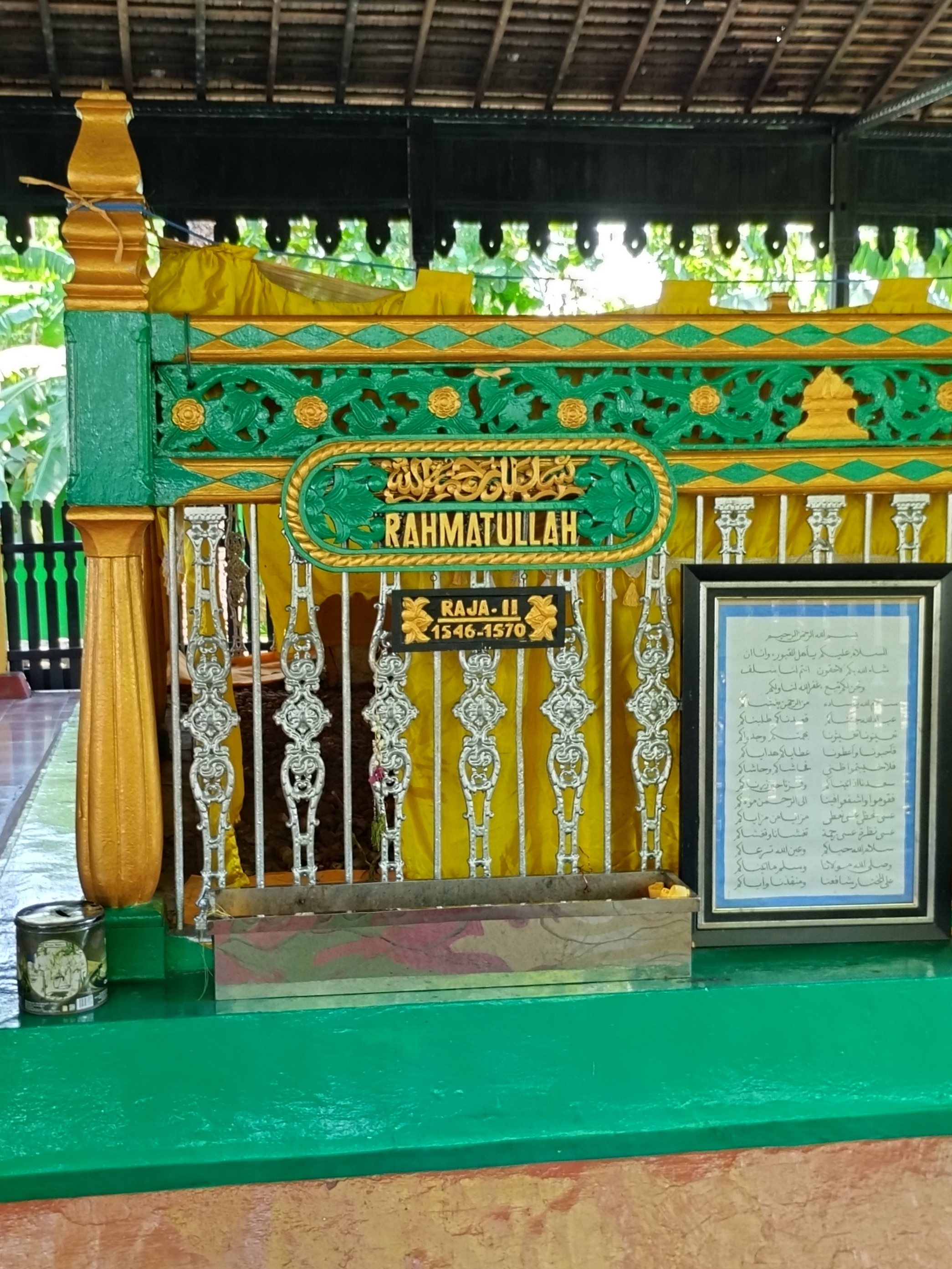
- Rahmatullah grave in Sultan Surianshah Tomb Complex

Sultan of Banjar
- Reign: 1540 – 1570
- Predecessor: Surianshah
- Successor: Hidayatullah I
- Burial: Sultan Surianshah Tomb Complex
- Issue: Sunan Batu Hirang; Pangeran Demang; Raden Zakaria
Regnal name
- توان كبوه دولي يڠ مها مليا ڤدوك سري سلطان رحمةالله سونن باتو ڤوتيه; Tuan Kebawah Duli Yang Maha Mulia Paduka Seri Sultan Rahmatullah Sunan Batu Putih
Posthumous name
- ڤانمبهان باتو ڤوتيه; Panembahan Batu Putih; سوسوهونن باتو ڤوتيه; Susuhunan Batu Putih
- House: Banjarmasin dynasty
- Father: Suryanullah Shah
- Religion: Islam Sunni

Rahmatullah was the second Sultan of Banjar who ruled from 1540 until his death in 1570.

== Early life ==
Rahmatullah was the eldest son of Surianshah, the founding sultan of the Banjar Sultanate. Rahmatullah has a younger brother who serves as Raden Dipati named "Prince Anom".

According to the Maanyan tribe who inhabit the Jaar-Sanggarwasi village in East Barito, Sultan Rahmatullah's father, Sultan Surianshah, also married Norhayati, the daughter of Labai Lamiah, a Dayak Maanyan figure who had embraced Islam, who then gave birth to Princess Mayang Sari who ruled the Jaar region which was also called Singarasi and the tomb of Princess Mayang Sari is also located there.

During the reign of Sultan Rahmatullah, sending tribute to the Demak Sultanate was stopped because the ruler of Java had shifted to the king of the Pajang Sultanate.

| Preceded by Suriansyah of Banjar | Sultan of Banjar; 1540-1570 | Succeeded by Hidayatullah I of Banjar |
