= KITLV/Royal Netherlands Institute of Southeast Asian and Caribbean Studies =

Research institute in Leiden

Coordinates: 52°09′30″N 4°28′57″E

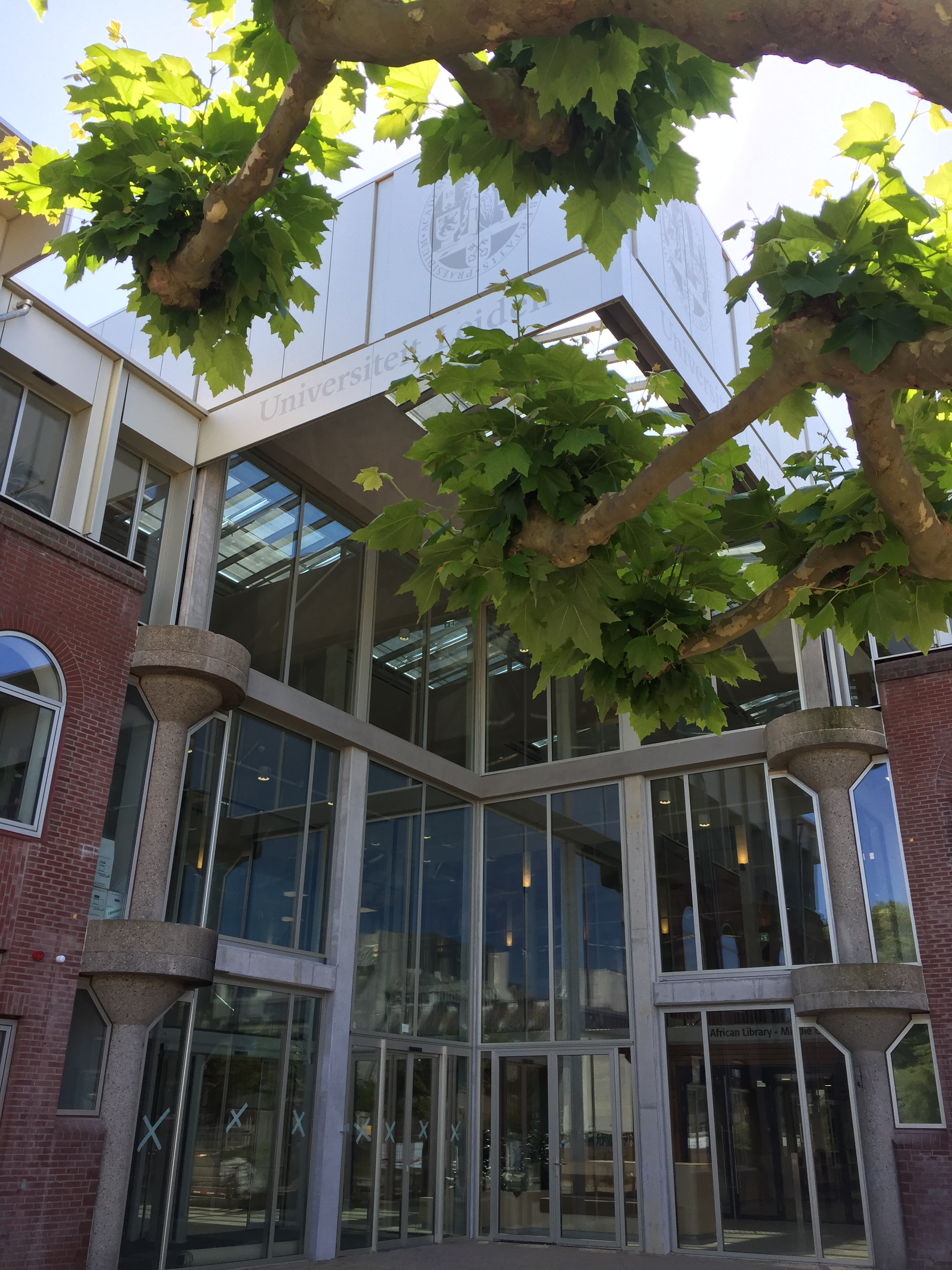
Herta Mohr Building in Leiden, home of KITLV

The KITLV/Royal Netherlands Institute of Southeast Asian and Caribbean Studies (Dutch: Koninklijk Instituut voor Taal-, Land- en Volkenkunde, lit. 'Royal Institute for the Linguistics, Geography and Ethnology', abbreviated as KITLV) at Leiden was founded in 1851. Its objective is the advancement of the study of the anthropology, linguistics, social sciences, and history of Southeast Asia, the Pacific Area, and the Caribbean. Special emphasis is laid on the former Dutch colonies of the Dutch East Indies (now Indonesia), Suriname, and the Dutch West Indies (the Netherlands Antilles and Aruba). Its unique collection of books, manuscripts, prints and photographs attracts visiting scholars from all over the world. On July 1, 2014, the management of the collection was taken over by Leiden University Libraries.

== Jakarta ==
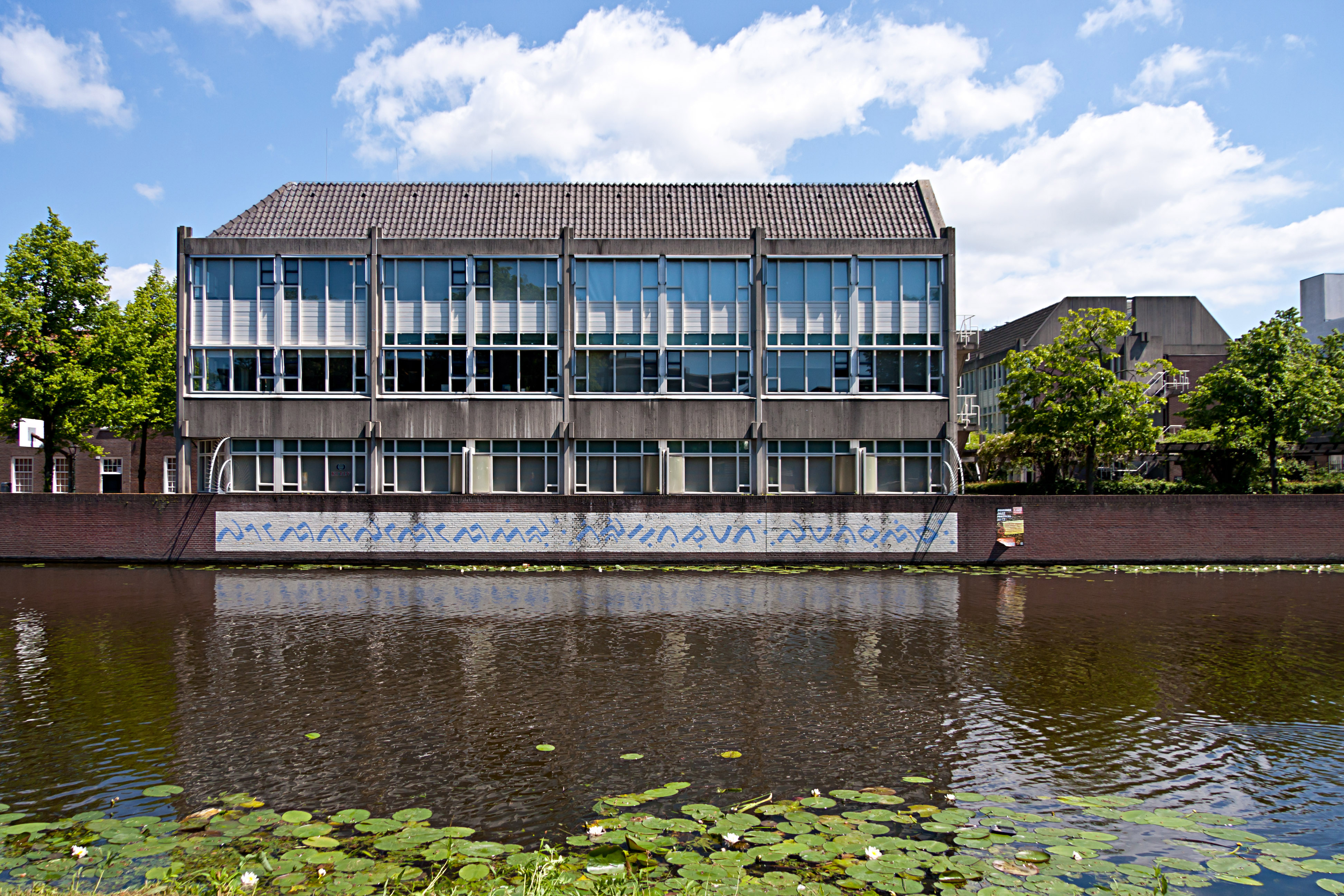
Former building of the KITLV/Royal Netherlands Institute of Southeast Asian and Caribbean Studies along the canal Witte Singel, Leiden, 2012, with a poem in Buginese language inscribed on the quay wall, one of the special wall poems in Leiden.

In 1969, a KITLV office was started by Hans Ras in Jakarta ("KITLV-Jakarta"), as a part of an agreement with the Indonesian Institute of Sciences. Here, publications from Indonesia, Malaysia and Singapore are bought and given a place in the library of the institute, publications of the institute are sold, and original scientific works in the Dutch language are translated into Indonesian. The Jakarta office is, since July 1, 2014, part of Leiden University Libraries and doubles as the representative office of Leiden University.

== Publications ==
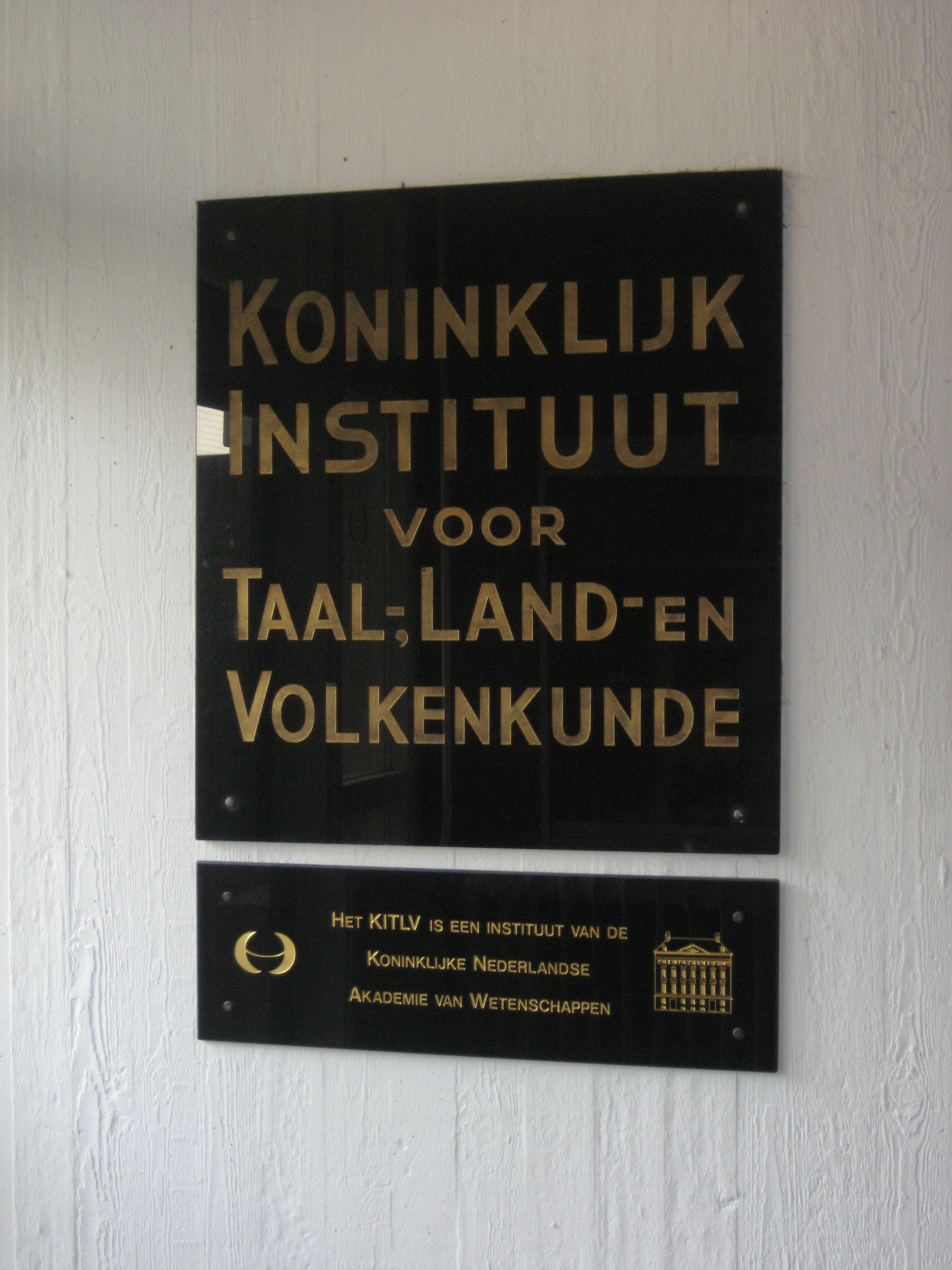
Plaque of KITLV, 2014.

The KITLV Press published and distributed academic books on Southeast Asian and Caribbean Studies. It also published three journals:

- Bijdragen tot de Taal-, Land- en Volkenkunde,
- Journal of Indonesian Social Sciences and Humanities, and
- New West Indian Guide / Nieuwe West-Indische Gids.

Brill acquired KITLV Press in 2012.
