= Negara Dipa =

Indonesia kingdom

Negara Dipa was a Hindu kingdom in South Kalimantan that appears in Hikayat Banjar. It was located in Amuntai near modern-day Tabasan. It was also the predecessor of Negara Daha and Banjar Sultanate.

== Early establishment ==
The area of South Kalimantan according to the oral history was the region of the Dayak Ma'anyan polity called Nan Sarunai based in the region between North Hulu Sungai and Tabalong as well as Kuripan kingdom (Tabalong in Nagarakretagama) based in Danau Panggang, though some historians think these are the same kingdom. Majapahit in its expansionist policy have launched two failed invasions under the reign of Jayanegara and Tribhuwana Wijayatunggadewi to conquer this kingdom. The third invasion was launched in 1355 under Hayam Wuruk. This invasion was led by Ampu Jatmika from Kalingga, Kediri, alongside his companions as recorded in Hikayat Banjar. Nan Sarunai at the time was led by Raden Anyan or Datu Tatuyan Wulau Miharaja Papangkat Amas. Multiple battles happened such as in 1358 and 1362. These invasions were recorded in Dayak Ma'anyan poetry as Nansarunai Usak Jawa (lit., Nan Sarunai destroyed by Javanese).

Afterward Ampu Jatmika founded the kingdom of Negara Dipa in 1380 or 1387. According to Hikayat Banjar, he also built Candi Agung over an older site in Amuntai. There are some disagreements by historians as there was also a kingdom called Kuripan of whether this was the continuation of same kingdom or also destroyed alongside the founding to Negara Dipa. According to a different version of Hikayat Banjar, Tutur Candi, the previous king of Kuripan adopted Ampu Jatmika as successor and after he died, the kingdom came to be called Negara Dipa, from the place where Ampu Jatmika ruled.

== Rule under Lambung Mangkurat ==
Ampu Jatmika had two sons called Ampu Mandastana (also Empu Mandastani) and Lambung Mangkurat (also Lembu Mangkurat and believed to be Dayak Ma'anyan's Dambung Mangkurap). According to oral history, before he died Ampu Jatmika instructed both sons not to succeed him as they are descendant of traders (waisya) and not aristocracy (ksatria) or they will face disasters.

After Ampu Jatmika died, he was succeeded by his second son, Lambung Mangkurat, because of the prohibition with the title Raja he took the title Ratu Kuripan. According to Hikayat Banjar, he expanded the rule of his kingdom to include regions in Tanjung Silat and Tanjung Puting. He as a king ruled over smaller regions (called Sakai), each was led by a Mantri Sakai. These regions listed in Hikayat Banjar were: Batang Barito, Batang Alai, Batang Hamandit, Batang Balangan, Batang Pitap, Biaju Kecil (Kapuas Murung River), Biaju Besar (Kahayan River), Sabangau, Mendawai Dayak, Katingan Dayak, Sampit Dayak and its subordinate, Pambuang Dayak and its subordinate.

Trying to follow his father's instructions Lambung Mangkurat tried to balampah (meditate) and met with Putri Junjung Buih coming up from buih (sea foam). According to Ras, she was the daughter of Ngabehi Hileer and was believed to be of local Dayak descent. Moreover, she was believed to be the manifestation of the female god Jata or Tambun ruler of the underwater world, which are sometimes described as large naga that support the earth. She was then raised to be Rajaputri and was married with a Majapahit prince by the name of Suryanata (Sun Prince). This union also has roots in the Ngaju Kaharingan belief of the union of sky and water. This Majapahit prince mentioned in Hikayat Banjar as Rahadyan Putra is believed to be Raden Aria Gegombak Janggala Rajasa.
