= Hans Ras =

Dutch linguist specializing in Javanese

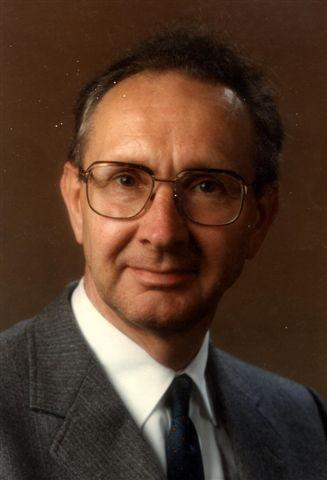
Ras around 1976

Johannes Jacobus (Hans) Ras (1 April 1926 – 22 October 2003) was emeritus professor of Javanese language and literature at Leiden University, the Netherlands. In 1961 he was lecturer at the University of Malaya, and in 1969 first representative in Jakarta of the KITLV (the Leiden-based Koninklijk Instituut voor Taal-, Land- en Volkenkunde = Royal Institute of Linguistics and Anthropology). Until his retirement he was several times a member of the board of the KITLV. From 1985 to 1992, he was professor of Javanese language and literature at the University of Leiden.

== Youth ==
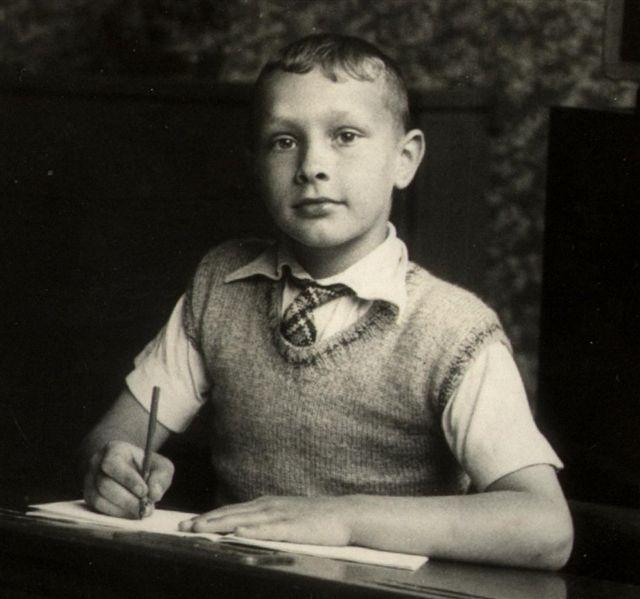
Hans in 1935

Hans Ras was born in 1926 in Rotterdam, the Netherlands, as the third son of a family of four children. His father had a wholesale business in confectionery, and all the children had to help in the business. They were all supposed to go to junior high school for their secondary education, as was usual at the time. However, when the eldest was expelled from such a school for precociousness and sent to a higher-grade high school, the others followed in his footsteps.

After Hans Ras passed his school-leaving exams, the Second World War broke out and he went into hiding, while his brothers were sent off into forced labour in Germany. Even at that time he was interested in languages, in particular the Javanese and Arabic language. But his high school certificate did not give him admission to an arts course at a university.

== Student years and travels ==
In 1946, Ras enrolled for the special course of Indonesian studies for future employees with the Dutch colonial civil service. However, the political developments in the then Dutch East Indies made him realize that there was no future for Dutch civil servants in that country. After switching to economics for a while, he left the Netherlands for France, where he found a job on a dam construction project. Here his knowledge of Arabic, acquired in his Indonesian studies course, stood him in good stead, as most of the workers were North Africans. He acquired a taste for travelling and travelled on to Libya, Egypt, and Aden. On his return to the Netherlands, he did his national service training and after that, at the age of 24, applied for a job with the Rotterdam firm of Internatio (now called Internatio-Müller). He was sent to Indonesia, where he worked in then Batavia. Later he was sent as representative to Banjarmasin, in Southeast Kalimantan, to buy rubber from local growers. This was not without its dangers in the precarious relations between the Netherlands and Indonesia in those years. The local leftist trade unions were hostile to colonial capital, of which they regarded Internatio as a typical representative. In some of the violent demonstrations Ras was repeatedly threatened personally. For instance, once some workers who had been sacked used traditional medicine men to cast a spell on his house. As it became impossible to do his work any longer, he returned to the Netherlands.

His stay in Borneo had given Ras an even keener interest in Indonesia in all its aspects, however. He was accordingly advised by the then Professor of Malay, Drewes, to try to get the recently introduced Indonesian interpreter/translator’s certificate. He passed the exams for this certificate, which qualified him for enrolment at a university.

In the course of the exams, he had met Widjiati Soemoatmodjo. Widjiati, who was an employee of the Indonesian embassy and was transferred to Brussels in 1960. In the following period, Ras braved the weather in countless scooter rides between Leiden and Brussels. He was not to be deterred, even after a serious accident in which he sustained a severe concussion.

Meanwhile, Ras diligently applied himself to his studies, including the compulsory courses in the Arabic language and Sanskrit. He tried to learn the vocabulary of these languages by pinning lists of words and idioms on the walls of his room, which he tried to learn off by heart even while he was shaving!

== The University of Malaya ==
In 1961, Ras obtained his master's degree cum laude. He married Widjiati, and the newly-weds set out for Kuala Lumpur, where Ras had been appointed as lecturer at the University of Malaya even before passing his Master’s exams. His head of department was Professor Roolvink, who later became professor at Leiden. Besides his teaching duties, Ras devoted his time to writing a PhD thesis on the Hikayat Banjar, the Malaysian-language history of Banjarmasin.

In Kuala Lumpur, a son was born to the couple. On expiry of Ras’ three-year contract there, the family moved back to Leiden, where Ras became a lecturer in the Department of Languages and Cultures of Southeast Asia and Oceania.

In 1966, a daughter was born and Ras obtained his PhD degree cum laude on the basis of a voluminous thesis containing not only a careful edition of the text of the Hikayat Banjar but also a detailed description of the literary and cultural-historical context in which the text had originated. Not long after this, the Ras family left the Netherlands for Jakarta to make the necessary preparations for the establishment of the first Indonesian office of the KITLV there.

Ras made a success of this venture in spite of major political and bureaucratic obstacles. Thanks to his efforts, a solid foundation was laid for the academic cooperation between the Netherlands and Indonesia, which continues to this day.

== The University of Leiden, publications ==
After his return from Indonesia in 1971, Ras worked in the Department in Leiden. He concentrated more and more on Javanese and as associate of Professor Uhlenbeck took over part of the latter’s teaching load. When Uhlenbeck went into retirement, Ras was the obvious person to succeed him and so he was appointed professor of Javanese language and literature in 1985.

As an aid to the teaching of Javanese language, he wrote a Javanese grammar with a lengthy anthology of modern Javanese texts. Of special importance for the specialist scholar are a number of lengthy, in-depth studies of aspects of Javanese culture and literature. Two particular aspects of this culture enjoyed his special interest. In the first place he made a close study of the Indonesian wayang theatre and its historical development, translating the text of one play, The Abduction of Subadra, into Dutch. No less important are his studies on the origin, structure, function and reliability of Javanese historical texts, in particular the Babad Tanah Jawi. Ras’ most important studies were reprinted in the monograph The shadow of the Ivory Tree. Ras spent the last years of his life preparing a new edition of the Pararaton, one of the most complex Old Javanese texts from a philological and literary-historical point of view. This text had already drawn his attention while working on the Hikayat Banjar. Poor health prevented him from completing this project.

Ras did however publish his conclusions from a comparison of the Pararaton (1481 AD) with respectively the Sanskrit Canggal inscription (732 AD), the Śivagŗha (Siwagrha) inscription (856 AD), the Calcutta Stone (1041 AD) and the Babad Tanah Jawi (1836 AD). He finds clear similarities in character, structure and function of these texts. Also there is similarity with texts from the Malay historiography. On the ground of this, he concludes that from the whole Indonesian area one specific type of texts can be placed together in one literary genre, the ‘government chronicle’ or the ‘book of kings’: historiography at the service of the legitimacy of kingship.

Ras occupies a rightful place in the Leiden tradition of Indonesian studies. The qualities for which his publications stand out most are painstaking factual research, mostly of manuscripts, combined with wide scholarly reading, critical acumen, and keen intellect.

== Enthusiastic teacher, gripping and graphic lecturer ==
Ras was also active as a teacher and was known for a vivid lecturing style. Unlike most of his colleagues, he took a strong interest in folk theatre and popular culture, that is, in the vulgar aspects of Javanese culture in the Latin sense of the word.

Although he was a scholar of the old stamp and kept his students at a certain distance, he did try to get them actively involved with the subject. This he did by organizing a lecture in the form of a seminar with papers and talks by and discussion among the participants – quite an unusual approach in the department at the time – and by occasionally organizing lectures for students at his home.

He was able to inspire others with his own love for the culture and people of Java, in an academic as well as other respects. He took a deep interest in others who were interested in Indonesian, and particularly Javanese culture. Such as, for instance, the puppeteer from Haarlem, Rien Baartmans – who died far too young – who performed not only Dutch puppet plays but also Javanese wayang plays and was famous, especially among children, for his wonderful performances of Wayang Kancil stories about the mouse deer. And his good friend Ger van Wengen, who devoted his time as curator at the Leiden ethnological museum to popularizing ethnology, with Ger using data provided by Hans, such as his book De schending van Soebadra (The Abduction of Subadra), and Hans learning from Ger.

== Old age ==
In 1992, Ras retired at the age of 66. It was not a happy development for him. He missed his work, and his health gradually failed him. He became a grandfather for the first time around the turn of the millennium, but was increasingly afflicted with Parkinson's disease. After an attack of pneumonia in 2000, it was no longer possible to live at home. He was moved to a nursing home in the village of Warmond, near Leiden, in August 2002, where, nursed with loving care by Widjiati till the end, he died on 22 October 2003.

After Ras’ retirement in 1992, Javanese studies at Leiden continued along the path followed, or even cleared by Hans Ras. The focus on written texts, by which of course Javanese studies in Leiden were characterized also before Ras’ time, continues to be dominant in the department’s approach. Although traditional historiography – which was one of his specialities – rather faded into the background, Ras’ attention to contemporary popular culture laid the foundations for the serious scholarly study of this which is still practised there today.

== Bibliography ==
- Hikajat Bandjar. A study in Malay historiography. (1968, ’s Gravenhage: Nijhoff. Bibliotheca Indonesica 1)
- Lange consonanten in enige Indonesische talen. Dubbel geschreven mediale consonanten. (1968, BKI 124: 521-541)
- The Panji (king) romance and W.H. Rassers' analysis of its theme (1973, BKI 129: 411-456)
- De schending van Soebadra Javaans schimmenspel volgens Soerakartase traditie bewerkt door ki Kodiron. Vertaald uit het Javaans en van toelichtingen voorzien. (1976, Amsterdam: Meulenhoff. De Oosterse Bibliotheek 1)
- The historical development of the Javanese shadow theatre. Review of Indonesian and Malayan Affairs (1976, 10.2: 50-76)
- De clownfiguren in de wayang (1978, BKI 134: 451-465)
- Javanese literature since independence. An anthology. (1979, Gravenhage: Nijhoff. VKI 88, ISBN 90-247-2309-4)
- Inleiding tot het modern Javaans. (1982), Gravenhage: Nijhoff. ISBN 90-247-6176-X
- The social function and cultural significance of the Javanese wayang purwa theatre. (1982, Indonesia Circle 29: 19-32)
- The main characters of the Wayang Poerwa, thirty-seven colour plates, with a summary of the Pandawa cycle, (1985, Foris Publications Dordrecht, Reeks Indonesische herdrukken, ISBN 90-6765-069-2 in map)
- The Babad Tanah Jawi and its reliability. Questions of content, structure and function. In: C.D. Grijns and S.O. Robson (eds.), Cultural contact and textual interpretation. Papers from the Fourth European Colloquium on Malay and Indonesian Studies, held in Leiden in 1983 (1986, Dordrecht, Cinnaminson: Foris. VKI 115, pp. 246–273)
- Hikayat Banjar and Pararaton. A structural comparison of two chronicles. In: C.M.S. Hellwig and S.O. Robson (eds.), A man of Indonesian letters (1986, Dordrecht, Cinnaminson: Foris VKI 121, pp. 184–203), ISBN 90-6765-206-7
- Hofdichters op Java in de Hindu-Javaanse tijd (negende tot zestiende eeuw) (1986, in De Bruyn, Idema en Van Oostrom, Dichter en hof. Verkenningen in veertien culturen. Utrecht: HES. blz. 225-243)
- Betekenis en functie van de Babad Tanah Jawi. In: W.L. Olthof, Babad Tanah Jawi. Javaanse Rijkskroniek. W.L. Olthofs vertaling van de prozaversie van J.J. Meinsma, lopende tot het jaar 1721 (1987, Dordecht: Foris. 2nd, rev. ed. with an introduction by J.J. Ras KITLV Indonesische Herdrukken, pp. ix-liv. Tekst ISBN 90-6765-219-9. Translation ISBN 90-6765-218-0.)
- The genesis of the Babad Tanah Jawi. Origin and function of the Javanese court chronicle. (1987, BKI 143: 343-356)
- Javanese tradition on the coming of Islam. In: W.A.L. Stokhof and N.J.G. Kaptein (eds.), Makalah-makalah yang disampaikan dalam rangka kunjungan menteri agama R.I.H. Munawir Sjadzali, M.A. ke Negeri Belanda (31 October - 7 November 1988) (1990, Jakarta: INIS, Seri INIS 6, pp. 147–178)
- Siti Hawa Salleh, Hikayat Banjar. Johannes Jacobus Ras. Penterjemah Siti Hawa Salleh. Dewan Bahasa dan Pustaka. Kementerian Pendidikan Malaysia. (1990, Kuala Lumpur, ISBN 983-62-1240-X)
- In memoriam Professor C.C. Berg, 18-12-1900 tot 25-6-1990 (1990, BKI 147-1 (1991): pp. 1–11)
- Variation, transformation and meaning. (1991, 242 pages, Leiden, VKI 144, ISBN 90-6718-027-0)
- Konsep raja sakti'di Jawa pada jaman kuno, in: Lokesh Chandra (ed.), The art and culture of South-East Asia, pp. 321–36, 1991. New Delhi: International Academy of Indian Culture. [Sata-Pitaka Series 364.]
- The Shadow of the Ivory Tree. Language, literature and history in Nusantara. (1992, Semaian 6. Vakgroep Talen en Culturen van Zuidoost-Azië en Oceanië, Rijksuniversiteit te Leiden. ISBN 90-73084-07-5.)
- Geschiedschrijving en de legitimiteit van het koningschap op Java (1994, BKI 150-3 (1994): pp. 518–38)
- Sacral kingship in Java. In: Marijke J. Klokke and Karel R. van Kooij (eds.), Fruits of inspiration. Studies in honour of Prof. J.G. de Casparis, retired Professor of the Early History and Archaeology of South and Southeast Asia at the University of Leiden, the Netherlands, on the occasion of his 85th birthday, pp. 373–388. Groningen: Egbert Forsten, 2001. [Gonda Indological Studies 11.]ISBN 90-6980-137-X
