= Negara Daha =

Empire in Indonesia

Negara Daha was a Hindu kingdom successor of Negara Dipa that appears in the Hikayat Banjar. It was located in what is now the Regency of Hulu Sungai Selatan, Province of South Kalimantan, Republic of Indonesia.

== Early establishment ==
Before the formation of the kingdoms in South Kalimantan, the people were still grouped based on the watershed area. After that, a political unit was formed that combined these groups into a kingdom, namely the Kingdom of Negara Dipa. This kingdom was later renamed Negara Daha, after the capital was moved upstream.

== Government structure ==
During the reign of the Kingdom of Negara Daha, the center of government in the South Kalimantan area was located in Muhara Hulak, Nagara.

The Kingdom of Negara Daha also has a trading port in Muara Bahan, Hulu Sungai Selatan Regency.

The original inhabitants of the Daha Kingdom came from the Banjar Masih people. They inhabit the lower reaches of the Barito and Batang Banyu rivers and speak Banjarese. In addition, there is the occupation of the Banjar Kuala people, the Banjar Pahuluan people, and the Dayak people.

== Chronicles of kings and their works ==
The founder and first king of the Daha State Kingdom was Sekarsungsang. He was given the title Panji Agung Maharaja Sari Kaburangan. He moved the previous capital of Negara Dipa located in Amuntai to the new administrative center in Muara Hulak with its port is in Muara Bahan. Since then the kingdom was known as Negara Daha. The territory of Negara Daha included Sewa Agung, Bunyut, Karasikan, Balitung, Lawai, and Kotawaringin.

The second king of Negara Daha was Raden Sukarama, he chose Raden Samudera, his grandson to succeed him. This was because Sukarama considered him to be the ideal king, patrilineal and matrilineal descent of kings, following an ancient warning by Empu Djatmika the founder of the dynasty. His mother was Raden Sukarama's daughter, Puteri Galuh Baranakan, while his father was Raden Manteri Alu, son of Sukarama's brother.

Raden Sukarama's sons contested the succession, with the eldest, Prince Arya Mangkubumi successfully made himself king of the Negara Daha. Although he would rule shortly as he died in the same year (1520). He was succeeded by his younger brother Prince Tumenggung. Raden Samudera later fled and founded a kingdom in the region of Banjar Masih, port/villages of the Oloh Masih (Ngaju: coastal islamised people, i.e., Malay people), later called Banjarmasin. After that he asked the Demak Sultanate for help to take back its power. Raden Samudera was able to take back his power as king in the Daha Kingdom and establish Banjar kingdom with Islamic influence from Demak.

== List of rulers ==
These are the rulers of Daha named in the Hikayat Banjar.

1. Raden Sekarsungsang (Maharaja Sari Kaburangan), 1478–1486
2. Maharaja Sukarama, 1486–1520
3. Maharaja Mangkubumi, 1520
4. Maharaja Tumenggung, 1520–1526
