= Hikayat Banjar =

The Hikayat Banjar (Banjar: حكاية بنجر, romanized: hikāyat banjar) is the chronicle of Banjarmasin, Indonesia. This text, also called the History of Lambung Mangkurat, contains the history of the kings of Banjar and of Kotawaringin in southeast and south Borneo respectively.

The final part of the text dates from 1663 or slightly later; the first part is older. The text is 4787 lines long (120 pages quarto). A careful text edition alongside a detailed description of the literary and cultural-historical context was published by the Dutch philologist Hans Ras in 1968.

== Structure ==
Structurally the Hikayat Banjar can be divided in nine sections. The first story details the origin of the Hindu kingdom in southeast Borneo. The function of this story is clearly to give a model for the political organisation or the realm and to set the standards for court ceremony and etiquette. Then there follow eight sections giving in succession the story of:

- the first king and queen of the dynasty, followed by a piece of genealogy (kraton I)
- the first king of Negara Daha, followed by a piece of genealogy (kraton II)
- the first king of Banjarmasin, followed by a piece of genealogy (kraton III)
- the first king of Martapura, followed by a piece of genealogy (kraton IV)

== Different versions ==
The text of the Hikayat Banjar was written and rewritten several times. Of several that have been preserved; the "Recension II" version derives from an older version derived from oral tradition, whereas another variant at the Leiden University Library MS. Or. 1701, presents a more modern version.
