= Naga Salira =

Weapon of Prince Surianata

Naga Salira is the name of the dagger of Prince Surianata, the first king of the Kingdom of Banjar, Indonesia.

The dagger is covered by handle made of gold and diamonds. The legend says that it originated from the tongue of a dragon.
