= Umbu Dedu Ngara =

Indonesian politician (born 1941)

1st Speaker of the Central Sumba Regional House of Representatives
- In office 2009–2014
- Preceded by: None

Member of the Central Sumba Regional House of Representatives
- In office 2009–2014
- Preceded by: None

Personal details
- Born: 25 March 1941 (age 85) Lawonda, Central Sumba, Dutch East Indies
- Party: PDIP
- Education: Satya Wacana Christian University

Umbu Dedu Ngara (born 25 March 1941) is an Indonesian retired civil servant and politician known for his advocacy to establish Central Sumba as a separate regency. He previously worked in the East Nusa Tenggara regional planning agency and served as the speaker of the Central Sumba Regional House of Representatives from 2009 to 2014.

== Early life and education ==
Umbu Dedu Ngara was born in Lawonda, Central Sumba, on 25 March 1941 into a noble family, though not of the raja lineage. He and his siblings received their education primarily in Java. Ngara studied at the Satya Wacana Christian University in Salatiga and was actively involved in the Indonesian Christian Student Movement.

== Bureaucratic and political career ==
Most of Ngara's professional life was spent as a bureaucrat in Kupang, the capital of the East Nusa Tenggara province, as a staff member of the province's regional planning agency. During his tenure in the agency, he was entrusted to handle the Integrated Area Development Project program, an assistance program from Australia to East Nusa Tenggara. After several years, he eventually became the agency's head. Despite his responsibilities as a bureaucrat keeping him away from Sumba for much of his life, he maintained ties to his home region and stayed engaged with issues affecting Sumbanese communities.

Shortly following the fall of Suharto, Ngara emerged as a key figure advocating for the creation of Central Sumba as a new regency, alongside parliament member Manasse Malo and army officer Markus Dairo Talu. Collaborating with officials and community leaders, he helped bring the proposal to meetings of Sumbanese associations in Kupang, and later was part of a delegation that initiated local campaigns in Anakalang, the eastern part of Sumba.

Ngara and his colleagues founded the Consulting Committee on Village Development aimed at gathering support and satisfying legal requirements for establishing the new regency. Their strategy involved organizing workshops, engaging representatives from youth, women's, village, and church organizations, and securing recommendations from regency and provincial authorities as well as from the national parliament in Jakarta. The main arguments for the establishment of a separate Central Sumba regency were to improve access to government services and to recognize shared linguistic and cultural ties in the region. During the process, he ran as a candidate for the West Sumba—the parent region of Central Sumba—Regional House of Representatives in the 2004 elections from the Indonesian Democratic Party of Struggle.

The regency formation campaign resulted in the establishment of the Central Sumba regency as a separate regency on 22 May 2007. Ngara participated in the regency's first ever elections in 2009, where he ran as a candidate for the Central Sumba's Regional House of Representatives. He was elected and became the inaugural speaker of the Central Sumba's Regional House of Representatives from 2009 to 2014. During his tenure, he oversaw a cooperation agreement between the regency and the IPB University on research, development, and scholarship programs for students from the regency to study at IPB and supported plans by mining company to explore Central Sumba's mineral resources.

After retiring from the speakership, Ngara became an advocate for the establishment of the Sumba Sabu Raijua province, which would be formed from the three minor islands of East Nusa Tenggara: Sumba, Sabu, and Raijua.
