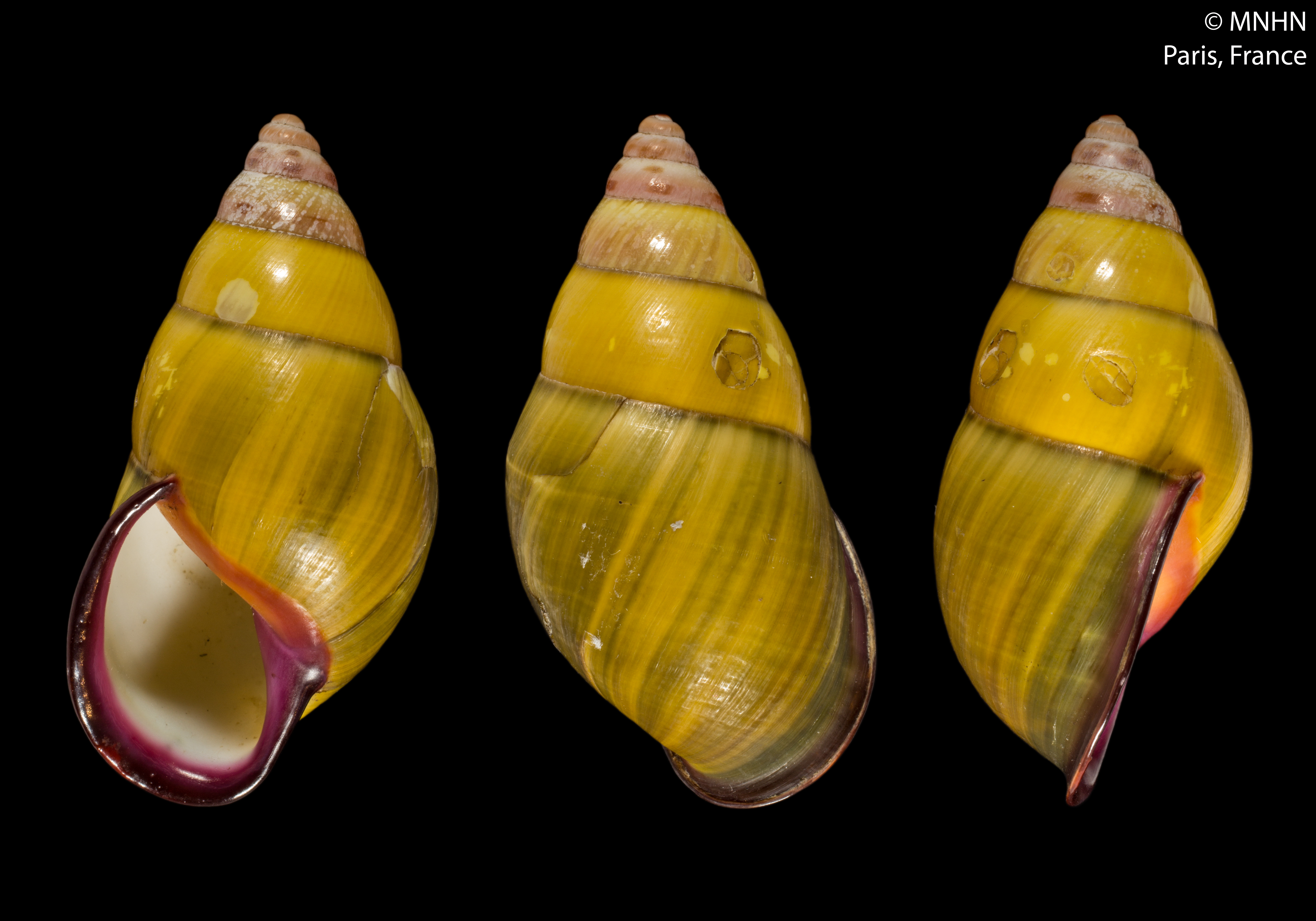
- Shell of Amphidromus sriabbasae (holotype at MNHN, Paris)

Scientific classification
- Kingdom: Animalia
- Phylum: Mollusca
- Class: Gastropoda
- Order: Stylommatophora
- Family: Camaenidae
- Genus: Amphidromus
- Species: A. sriabbasae

Binomial name
- Amphidromus sriabbasae Thach, 2017

= Amphidromus sriabbasae =

Species of snail in the family Camaenidae

Amphidromus sriabbasae is a species of medium-sized air-breathing tree snail, an arboreal gastropod mollusk in the family Camaenidae.

== Description ==
The length of the shell attains 44.9 mm.

== Distribution ==
The type locality of this species is Manura, South Katikutana, Central Sumba Regency, East Nusa, Tenggara, Indonesia.
