= Indonesian Christian Student Movement =

Christian student organization in Indonesia

Indonesian Christian Student Movement Gerakan Mahasiswa Kristen Indonesia
- Emblem

- Gonfalon
- Chairman: Prima Surbakti
- Secretary General: Jessica Esther Warouw
- Founded: 9 February 1950
- Merger of: Indonesian Christian Students Association; Christelijke Studenten Vereniging op Java
- Ideology: Pancasila; Christianity; Socialism (1963–1965)
- Colours
- Mother party: Indonesian Christian Party (until 1973)
- International affiliation: World Student Christian Federation
- Website: gmki.or.id

The Indonesian Christian Student Movement (Indonesian: Gerakan Mahasiswa Kristen Indonesia, GMKI) is a Progressive Christian student organization in Indonesia. Established on 9 February 1950, it is the product of a merger between the Christelijke Studenten Vereniging op Java, which is the organization for Christian students in Java, and the Indonesian Christian Students Association. The movement is a member of the Cipayung Group and the Pancasila Front and is internationally affiliated with the World Student Christian Federation.

== History ==
=== Predecessors (1920–1950) ===
The need to establish a movement for Christian students in Indonesia began in the 1920s. The Christelijke Studenten Vereeniging op Java, as the predecessor of GMKI, was inspired by the Dutch Christian Student Association (NCSV). One of the leaders of NCSV, C. L. van Doorn, arrived in Indonesia with his wife in 1921 to visit several Javanese cities in hope of establishing a similar organization in Indonesia. This bore fruit when he met with Johannes Leimena who, at that time, was still studying in STOVIA (medical school). Together, they established missionary activities, Bible discussions, and prayer groups. They formed the Christelijke Studenten Vereeniging Batavia in 1924 with its headquarters in Kebon Sirih.

CSV conducted missionary activities in other cities and formed separate branches in Bandung and Bogor. Both branches were united with the formation of Christelijke Studenten Vereeniging op Java (CSV) on 28 December 1932. The formation of CSV was prompted by the decision of J. R. Mott, the general secretary of the World Student Christian Federation (WSCF), to hold the WSCF congress in Bogor in 1933. Due to the appointment of the organization as the host of the congress, CSV became more popular worldwide. CSV was invited to various meetings, such as the conference of Christian Youth in Oakland, California, and the international youth meeting in Amsterdam.

With the Japanese occupation of the Dutch East Indies, which began on 8 March, 1942, CSV was dissolved by its leadership. After the proclamation of Indonesian independence, a new organization for Christian students in Indonesia, the Indonesian Christian Students Association (PMKI), was formed. The organization was formed at a meeting at the Jakarta Theological Seminary in 1945 led by Johannes Leimena and O.E. Engelen. PMKI's activities, such as Bible discussion, were largely the same as CSV's except that the organization was highly nationalistic, as it was filled by pro-independence students. PMKI later formed branches in Bandung, Bogor, Surabaya, and Jogjakarta.

At the same time, due to the return of the Dutch Army to Indonesia, CSV was re-activated by the Dutch officials in several cities, which were largely the same cities as PMKI. PMKI supported Indonesia's independence, while CSV supported the Dutch. This dualism caused both organizations to be rejected in WSCF, and both organizations conflicted frequently.

=== Formation (1950) ===
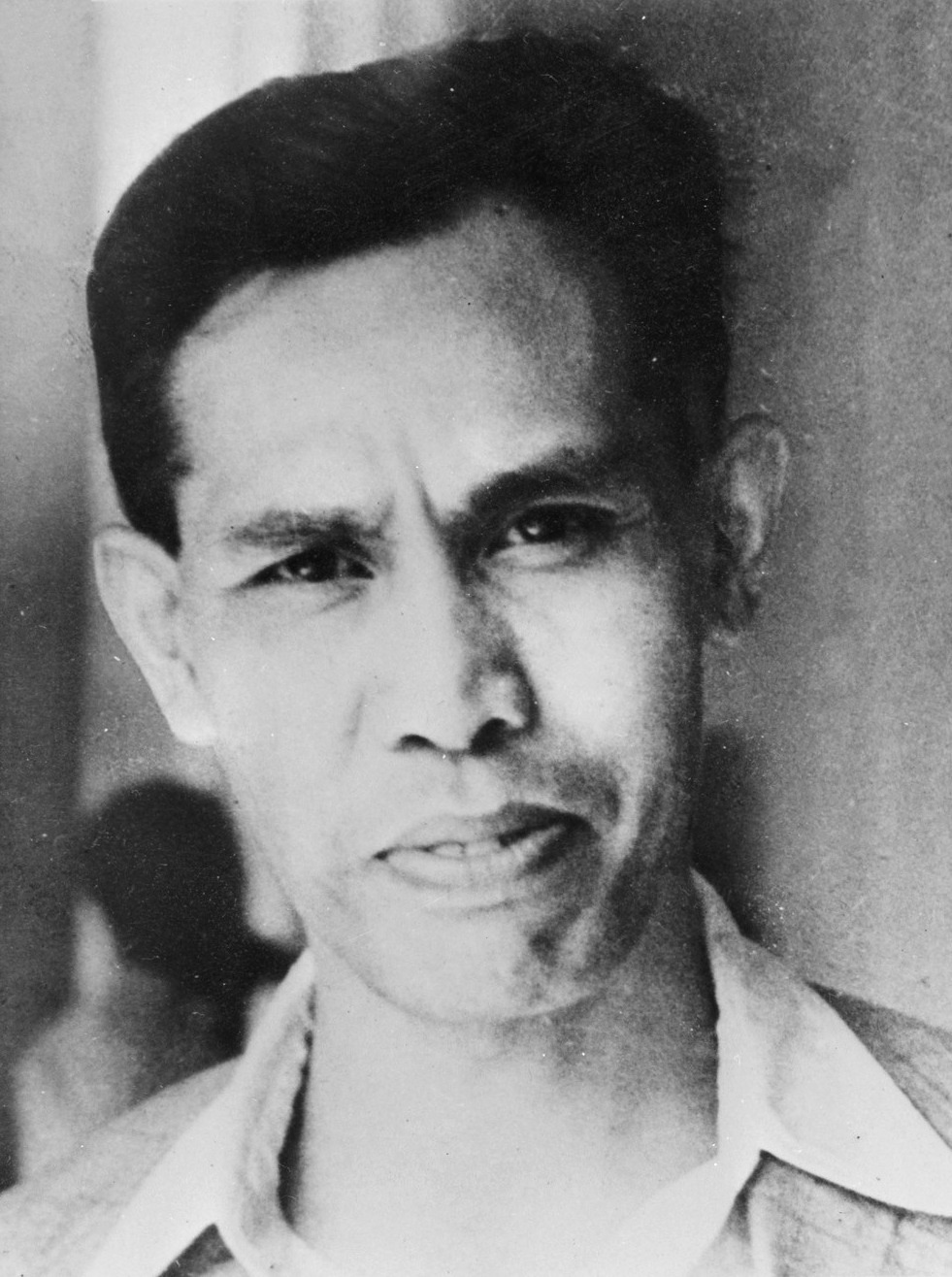
Johannes Leimena was a national hero of Indonesia, and the founder of GMKI.

After the recognition of Indonesia's independence by the Dutch, both student organizations continued to exist. To end further conflicts, both organizations decided to hold a meeting at founder Leimena's house at Teuku Umar Street No.36 on 9 February 1950. At the meeting, delegations from PMKI and CSV agreed to merge themselves into the Indonesian Christian Student Movement.

=== Development (1950–1960) ===
The Movement held its first congress on 23–29 December 1950. The congress discussed the general programs of GMKI and officially adopted Pancasila as the main theme of every congress. This political philosophy was in a speech by Indonesian nationalist leader Sukarno given on 1 June, 1945, arguing that the Indonesian state should be based on Five Principles: Indonesian nationalism; internationalism, or humanism; consent, or democracy; social prosperity; and belief in one God. The congress recorded a total number of 481 members in five cities: Jakarta (181 members), Bandung (187 members), Yogyakarta (40 members), Surabaya (64 members), and Makassar (9 members). The branches of the Movement held another congress in Sukabumi in October 1952. The second congress adopted a new constitution for GMKI and began to set a theme for the future. The second congress of GMKI also established the Bible as the official book of GMKI and set 9 February 1950 as the official formation date of GMKI.

The third congress of GMKI was held in Jogjakarta in 1952. During the congress, GMKI officially recognized two branches of GMKI in different cities, Medan and Bogor, bringing the number of members to 1099 in seven different branches. In the same year, GMKI was recognized as a full member of the World Student Christian Federation in its General Assembly in Nasrapur, India.

The next important step in GMKI's development was its sixth congress at Sukabumi in 1956. The congress created and approved a new constitution, by which the leadership is elected for a two-year term.

The congress reconfirmed its stance as an independent organization not affiliated with any political party. However, many people misinterpreted and saw GMKI as a wing of the Indonesian Christian Party.

=== Consolidation (1960–1970) ===
==== "Old Order" Consolidation (1960–1965) ====
The first era of consolidation in GMKI included efforts to stabilize its internal structure and reconcile Christian groups outside GMKI. This era began with a national study and leadership conference in 1960 held in Lawang, East Java, and the eighth congress of GMKI in 1961 in Surabaya. The congress restructured the leadership of GMKI by centralizing it. Before the congress, GMKI was led through a decentralized system that included a general board formed from a federation of GMKI branches. After the centralization, GMKI was led by the central board. The congress also began to organize its branches to ease the expansion of the movement.

During this era, there were two conflicting Christian youth organizations: the Union of Indonesian Christian Youth (PPKI) and the Ecumenical Christian Youth Council (MPKO). Through the initiative of GMKI, both parties held regular meetings, hosted by GMKI. The meetings ended on 23 April 1962 when both organizations agreed to fuse into the existent Indonesian Christian Youth Forces' Movement.

Beginning in 1963, GMKI became more socialistic and supported Sukarno's policy of continuous revolution. Socialism became the main theme for the ninth congress: "By Faith We Build Socialist Indonesia," and the sub-theme of the tenth congress: "With Independency We Built A Socialist Indonesia And A New World." The tenth congress proclaimed GMKI as the "child" of the "church" in the Indonesian National Revolution. The congress also proclaimed that GMKI was no longer a mass organization, but a cadre organization. The proclamation was reinforced by the government's recognition of the nine Christian organizations in Indonesia in the National Front, within which the Indonesian Christian Party officially cooperated with GMKI. The statement, which was declared in 1956, revoked the independence of GMKI.

The GMKI March.

The tenth congress of GMKI in 1965 at Manado officially adopted a new march for the organization. The competition for the march began before the congress. During the congress, three different branches of GMKI proposed their version of the march. The march proposed by the Jogjakarta branch, which was composed by Catharina Leimena, won the competition after being approved by the congress forum.

==== "New Order" Consolidation (1965–1970) ====
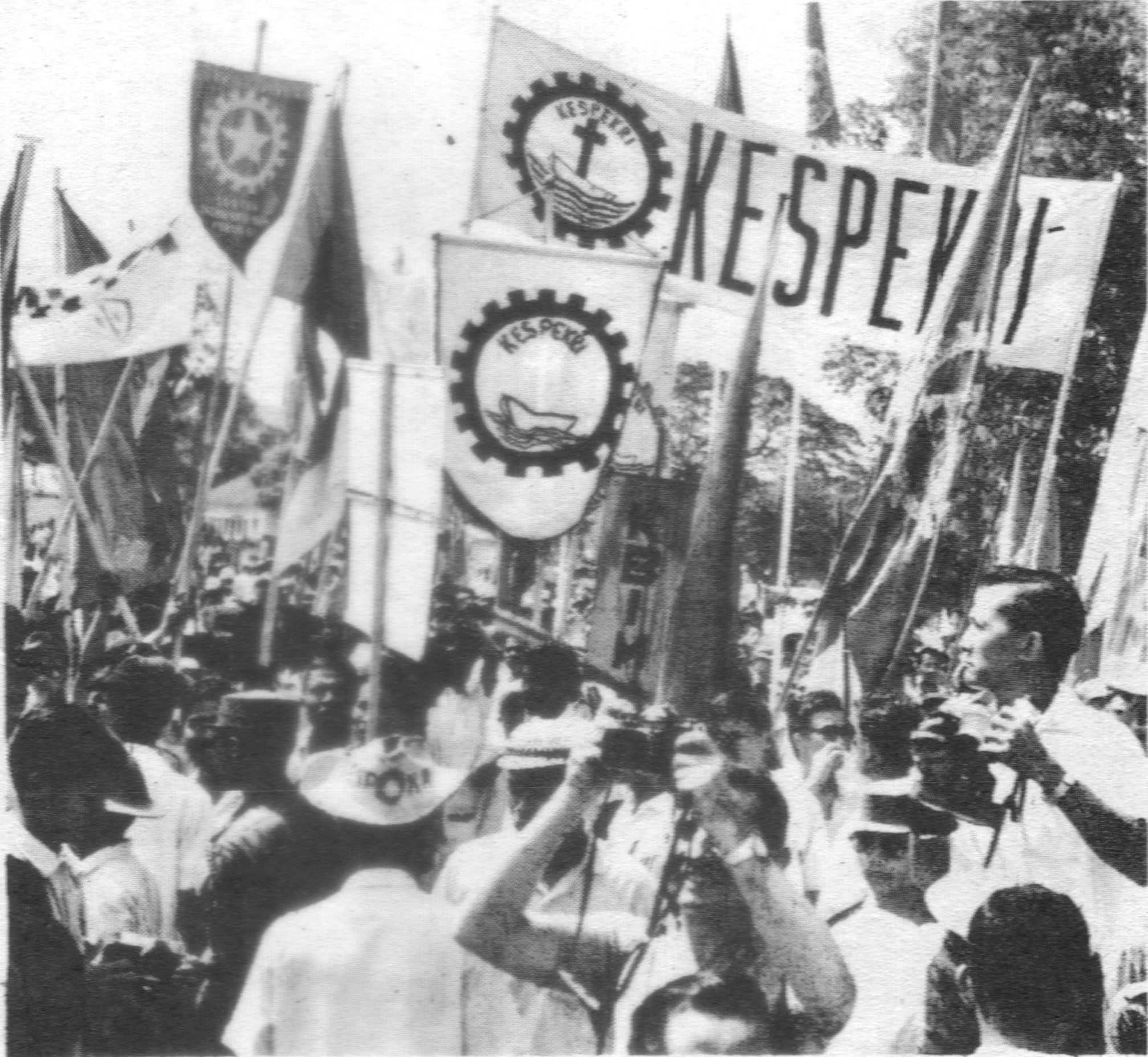
GMKI demonstrating against the Indonesian Communist Party, the perpetrator of the 30 September Movement.

After the 30 September Movement, GMKI dropped its socialistic stance and staunchly supported Pancasila as its official ideology. Together with other Christian organizations, GMKI joined the Pancasila Front as a way to show its support for the swelling anti-communist movement in Indonesia. The 30 September Movement was the main topic of discussion during the eleventh congress of GMKI in 1967 in Makale. The congress recorded the existence of 72 urban branches of GMKI, which was divided into 12 service areas.

The rise of Suharto into the presidential seat brought the depreciation of GMKI in different regions. In the twelfth congress of GMKI in Kupang in 1970, the congress recorded the shrinkage of GMKI's branches from the peak of 90 branches after its 1967 congress to only 32 branches in 1970. The decrease in the number of branches was due, in part, to the revamping of the university system by the government, which caused the closing of several universities that had no clear license or status. The decrease was also caused by the student's disinterest in joining extra-curricular organizations.

=== New Order (1970–1998) ===
==== Improvements ====
To adapt to the new situations in the New Order, the twelfth congress of GMKI agreed to become a functioning church in the universities. This action led to GMKI having a bigger influence, and by the beginning of the 1970s, GMKI became one of the two major Christian student's movements in the country, along with the Indonesian Christian Youth Forces' Movement, with GMKI being significantly bigger. GMKI became one of the five youth movements that initiated the informal "Cipayung Group" on 22 February 1972. The group officially formed the Indonesian National Youth Committee (KNPI) on 23 July 1973.

After the formation of KNPI, GMKI became a major movement in universities. To cope with that, GMKI continued to make improvements to its organization. For example, currently, inactive and/or malfunctioning branches are evaluated, and some of those branches may be dissolved if their existence is not deemed necessary. The other improvements made during this era are in the caderization system. During its fifteenth congress in Palembang in 1976, GMKI formed a new institution for the caderization and filtering of its future members: the Institution for Development and Research of Cadre (Indonesian: Lembaga Penelitian dan Pengembangan Kader, LPPK). Five years later, GMKI produced the Basic Education System for Cadres (Indonesian: Pola Dasar Sistem Pendidikan Kader, PDSPK). PDSPK was continually used for ten years until it was reevaluated in 1992.

==== Adoption of Pancasila ====
During the 1980s, Suharto prompted political parties to accept Pancasila as their only ideology, thereby creating the unity of a single principle. This concept was first delivered during Suharto's speech in the Armed Forces meeting on 27 March 1980 and again on the Kopassus anniversary on 16 April 1980. The concept was formally delivered in 1983 and was approved as a law in 1985. All political parties and mass organizations, including GMKI, should hold Pancasila as their only ideology and principle, ruling out any other ideology previously held.

The law was discussed in the twentieth congress of GMKI on Palangkaraya in 1986. Pancasila as a single ideology was adopted with the amendment of article 2 of the constitution. Previously, article 2 of the constitution stipulated that "In the life of the people and of the nation, the organization is based on the Bible." After the amendment, the word "Bible" was replaced with "Pancasila", and the sentence is added with "as its only ideology". Even though this move was considered by some to remove its identity as a Christian organization, GMKI responded to this by moving the Bible reference to its preamble.

=== Reformation (1998–present) ===
After the reformation era, the government revoked the obligation for all student organizations to adopt Pancasila as its single ideology. Although the obligation was revoked, GMKI still puts Pancasila as its only ideology.

The organization was officially registered as an organization with an establishment act on 23 February 2011.

== Organization ==
=== Congress ===
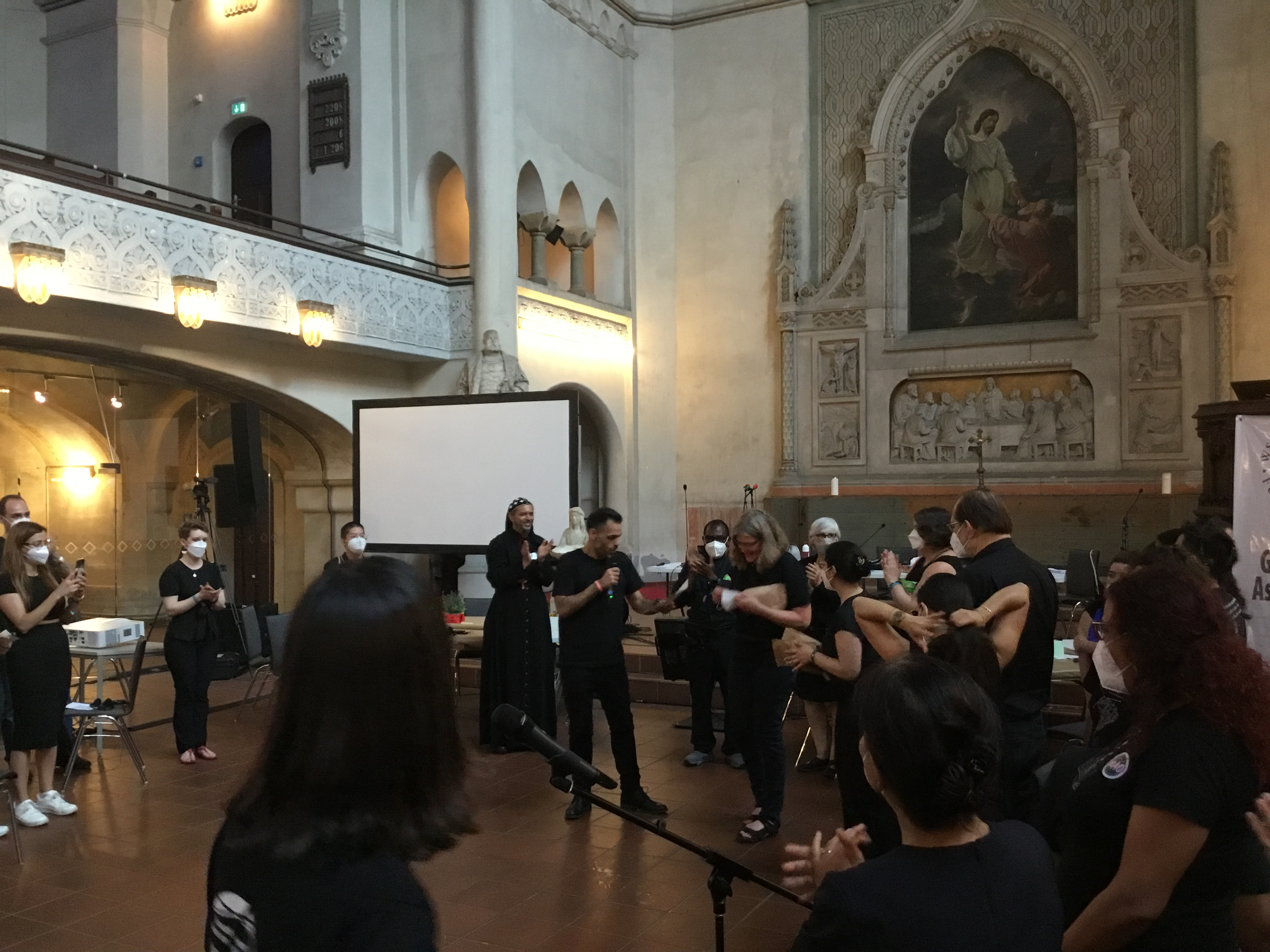
GMKI participated in the 37th General Assembly of the World Student Christian Federation in Berlin, Germany.

The congress is the highest communal ruling body of GMKI. It has met biannually since 1956. Congressional decisions are legally binding if the congress is attended by at least half plus one branch of GMKI, and at least half plus one from the determined number of delegates. The number of delegates is based on the number of members in its corresponding branch. Branches that have 25–100 members may send one delegate, while branches that have more than 1750 members may send a maximum of 10 delegates.

The congress is led by the Assembly of Heads, which consists of delegates and members of the Central Board appointed by the Congress. The congress is empowered to set the constitution of the movement, assess the general report by the Central Board, establish the outline of the program and GMKI, and elect the Central Board.

The most recent congress held by GMKI was the 36th Congress of GMKI, which was held from 12–19 September 2018 in the Green Forest Hotel, Batu Tulis, Bogor, West Java. The congress was opened by President Joko Widodo.

=== Central Board ===
Sitting on the central board is the highest leadership position in GMKI. The board is filled by five persons: the Chairman, General Secretary, General Treasurer, and two other members, with the chairman and general secretary representing the organization in internal and external affairs. The central board is appointed by and responsible to the congress. The central board is also responsible for the preparation of the congress.

The central board may establish and dissolve an auxiliary body in the form of a commission or committee. The central board may also appoint and depose members of the auxiliary body. The central board must also convene at least twice in a year.

=== Regional Conference ===
The regional conference is the highest body of GMKI at the regional level. The regional conference is tasked to assess the report by the Regional Board in the execution of the Congress, Central Board, and Regional Conference decisions, arrange the program for the branch, and establish the structure, policy, and budget.

The conference is responsible to the Central Board via the Regional Board, and must convene at least biannually. The conference is also eligible to elect a new Regional Board.

=== Regional Board ===
The regional board is the board of GMKI on the regional level. The board is filled by a minimum of three persons, the regional chairman, secretary, and treasurer. The formation of the regional board must be communicated to the members of the branch at a maximum of two months after the appointment.

The regional board is responsible for the regional conference and the preparation for the conference. The board must convene at least once every two months.

== Membership ==
Even though there is no explicit obligation for a member to be Christian, GMKI states that the members should accept the vision and mission of the movement, which contains statements of "the recognition of Jesus Christ as our Lord and Saviour". However, the official explanation of the constitution states that membership is open to other students with other faiths. The constitution also explicitly states that members of the central and regional board must be Christian.

The membership of GMKI is divided into four groups: ordinary, extraordinary, honorary and supportive members. Ordinary members are students who are currently active in a university and accepted by the Regional Board after fulfilling the prerequisites for membership. Extraordinary members are alumni who were ordinary members accepted by the Regional Board after fulfilling the prerequisites for membership. Honorary members are those who were considered meritorious by GMKI and were appointed by the Central Board with the recommendation of the Regional Board. Supportive members are those who help the movement periodically and are appointed by the Regional Board.

== List of chairmen ==
A list of chairmen of GMKI from its establishment in 1950 until now.

- Johannes Leimena (1950–1951)
- J. E. Siregar (1951–1953)
- A. L. Tamaela (1953–1954)
- J. E. Siregar (1954–1955)
- Sabam Siagian (1955–1956)
- Winanto (1956–1958)
- Binsar H. Siburian (1959–1961)
- Wim Montolalu (1961–1963)
- Peter Sumbung (1963–1965)
- Kilian Sihotang (1965–1967)
- Binsar Sianipar (1967–1972)
- Natigor Siagian (1972–1976)
- Shirato Syafei (1976–1978)
- Tony Waworuntu (1978–1980)
- Frans Allorerung (1980–1982)
- Yohan Sanggelorang (1982–1984)
- Sunggul Siahaan (1984–1986)
- Robert Sitorus (1986–1988)
- Nikolas Hasibuan (1988–1990)
- Marim Purba (1990–1992)
- Imanuel Blegur (1992–1996)
- Edward Tanari (1996–1998)
- Barita LH Simajuntak (1998–2000)
- David Pajung (2000–2002)
- Andre Manusiwa (2002–2004)
- Kenly Poluan (2004–2006)
- Goklas Nababan (2006–2008)
- Mamberob Yosephus Rumakiek (2008–2010)
- Johny Rahmat (2010–2012)
- Supriadi Narno (2012–2014)
- Ayub M Pongrekun (2014–2016)
- Sahat Martin Philip Sinurat (2016–2018)
- Corneles Galanjinjinay (2018–2020)
- Jefri Gultom (2020–now)
- Epafras Tuidano (2023–?, acting)

== Notable members ==
- Johannes Leimena (former Minister of Health and acting president of Indonesia, inaugural chairman of GMKI from 1950 to 1951)
- Sabam Siagian (Editor-in-chief of The Jakarta Post and former ambassador to Australia, chairman of GMKI from 1955 to 1956)
- Hamonangan Hutabarat (Secretary General of the Department of Finance, vice secretary general of GMKI from 1963 to 1964)
- Peter Patta Sumbung (Deputy Chief of the National Family Planning Coordinating Board, chairman of GMKI from 1963 to 1965)
- Manasse Malo (Member of parliament and dean at the University of Indonesia, secretary general of GMKI from 1965 to 1967)
- Bungaran Saragih (Minister of Agriculture, chair of GMKI from 1972 to 1974)
- Marianne Katoppo (Feminist theologian, chair of GMKI from 1974 to 1976)
- Alexander Litaay (Indonesian Ambassador to Croatia, chair of GMKI from 1980 to 1984)
- Barita Simanjuntak (Chairman of the Prosecution Commission, secretary general of GMKI from 1996 to 1998)
- Marim Purba (Mayor of Pematang Siantar, chairman of GMKI from 1990 to 1992)
- Sabam Sirait (Long-time MP from the Indonesian Democratic Party and the Indonesian Democratic Party of Struggle)
- W. T. P. Simarmata (Senator from North Sumatra)
- Maruarar Sirait (Minister of Housing and Residential Area)
- Yasonna Laoly (Minister of Law and Human Rights)
- Muchtar Pakpahan (labor leader, chairman of the Indonesian Workers Welfare Union)
- Balthasar Kambuaya (Minister of Forestry)
- Frits Bernhard Mewengkang (Dean of the Faculty of Engineering of the University of Indonesia)
- Adrianus Mooy (Governor of Bank Indonesia)
- Theo Waimuri (Ambassador to Namibia)
