= Markus Dairo Talu =

Indonesian politician (born 1961)

Regent of Southwest Sumba
- In office 8 September 2014 – 8 September 2019
- Preceded by: Antonius Umbu Zaza (acting)
- Succeeded by: Kornelius Kodi Mete

Personal details
- Born: 31 December 1961 (age 64) West Sumba, Indonesia
- Spouse: Ratu Ngadu Wulla
- Children: 8 daughters
- Occupation: Politician; Military officer

Military service
- Allegiance: Indonesia
- Years of service: 1991-2009
- Unit: Military Police Corps

Markus Dairo Talu (born 31 December 1961) is an Indonesian politician and former military officer who served as the Regent of Sumba Barat Daya from 2014 to 2019.

== Early life and education ==
Markus Dairo Talu was born in Sumba Barat on 31 December 1961 as the only son of D.B. Deta, a retired sub-district official, and Naomi N. Moto, a farmer. His father died when Markus was only two months old, leaving his mother to support him and his older sister through agriculture. He attended primary school at the Redambolo elementary school and continued to the Waimangura Catholic Middle School. Due to financial difficulties, he was unable to advance directly to high school after junior secondary school.

With support from his family, especially his aunt in Surabaya, Markus moved to Java and enrolled in a mechanic's course with scholarship support. During his studies in Java, he was introduced to the army by an officer whom he met during his studies. He passed the entrance test for the Indonesian Army and started his military career as an enlisted soldier. While stationed in Jakarta, he completed high school held by the army's education agency in Central Jakarta. He later studied law at the Christian University of Indonesia in Jakarta, while undergoing military training and assignments.

== Military career ==
Markus began his military service as a member of the army military police corps in Jakarta. After completing the non-commissioned officer candidate school for army military police members, from 1991 to 1993 he served as an aide to Major General Kentot Harseno, the Commander of the Jakarta Military Regional Command. When Harseno was appointed as inspector general for national development by President Suharto, Markus served as his staff until 1998. From 1999 to 2005, Markus worked as staff at Texmaco, a private sector company, but later returned to military-related roles as a military police until his retirement in 2009. Alongside his official military duties, he took on freelance work in security, acting as a bodyguard and "debt collector" for Jakarta businessmen, and as a doorman at a discotheque in the city. Due to his side jobs, Talu was able to established himself financially and socially, owning multiple properties and providing employment and housing to around 50 young men originating from Sumba.

== Political career ==
Markus Dairo Talu was key figure in advocating for the creation of new districts in Sumba, alongside parliament member Manasse Malo and politician Umbu Dedu Ngara. He served as chairman of the Jakarta Lobby Committee for Southwest Sumba and was instrumental in organizing and sponsoring the campaign for the proposed regency known as Sumba Jaya. As chairman of the Union of Sumbanese in Greater Jakarta, Talu helped link the Sumbanese diaspora with local initiatives, expanding the political and social networks available to the movement.

During his military career in Jakarta, Talu returned twice to Sumba. His first return was in April 2003 to attend the People’s Congress for Sumba Jaya, the 50th meeting in preparation of Sumba Jaya, which was attended by representatives from multiple sub-districts. He contributed to the congress by providing material support such as t-shirts, caps, and financial aid during campaign event. His second return, in 2005, was as a running mate for Jubilate Pandango in the West Sumba regent election, but the pair failed to receive sufficient votes.

Following his retirement, he attempted to run as the regent of the newly established Southwest Sumba, but did not pass the official verification stage. He ran again in 2013, this time with Ndara Tanggu Kaha as his running mate. The election saw violence between supporters of Talu and his opponent incumbent regent Kornelis Kodi Mete. Initial counts suggested a narrow Talu victory. However, around 12,000 votes were reportedly falsified, which would turn the election in Mete's favor. After the local General Elections Commission (KPUD) ruled in Mete's favor and nullified Talu's victory, the dispute escalated to the Constitutional Court of Indonesia which overturned the KPUD's decision and maintained Talu's victory. Due to the dispute, Talu was only sworn in one and a half years after the election, on 8 September 2014.

As Regent of Sumba Barat Daya, Talu prioritized agricultural reform, aiming to enhance land productivity and the livelihoods of the region’s predominantly farming population. Drawing from his difficult childhood experiences with drought and poverty, he advocated for better infrastructure, education, and health services. He launched initiatives to improve irrigation and access to clean water and pushed for the use of farming technologies to elevate living standards.

Talu ran for a second term in the regency's 2018 election, in a four-way election against Ndara Tanggu Kaha and Kornelis Kodi Mete among others. Talu won 63,886 votes, behind Mete's 67,764, and failed to secure a second term. Mete was sworn in to replace Talu on 8 September 2019.

After the end of his term as regent, Talu was appointed head of the Family Welfare Movement (PKK) organization in Sumba Barat Daya.

== Personal life ==
Markus Dairo Talu is married to Ratu Ngadu Wulla. The couple has eight daughters.
