= Manasse Malo =

Indonesian academic administrator and politician

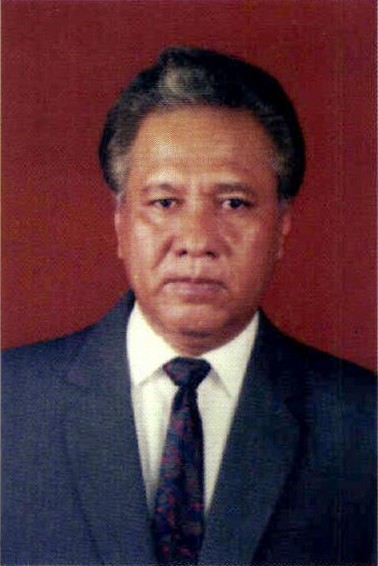

Member of the House of Representatives
- In office 1 October 1999 – 1 October 2004
- Parliamentary group: PDKB/FKB
- Constituency: East Nusa Tenggara

Chairman of the Love the Nation Democratic Party
- In office 5 August 1998 – 2002
- Preceded by: office established
- Succeeded by: Gregorius Seto Harianto (Chairman of PPDKB); Samuel Ferdinand Poli (Chairman of PDKB Pembaruan)

Dean of the University of Indonesia Faculty of Social and Political Sciences
- In office 1982 – 1 October 1988
- Preceded by: Tobias Soebekti
- Succeeded by: Juwono Sudarsono

Secretary General of the Indonesian Christian Student Movement
- In office 28 September 1965 – 30 September 1967
- Preceded by: Kilian Sihotang
- Succeeded by: Supardan

Personal details
- Born: 2 May 1941 West Sumba, Dutch East Indies
- Died: 6 January 2007 (aged 65) Waingapu, East Sumba, East Nusa Tenggara, Indonesia
- Party: Love the Nation Democratic Party
- Other political affiliations: Golkar (1971 – 1998)
- Spouse: Tashya Umboh
- Children: 3
- Parents: Herman Malo Ndapatondo (father); Yuliana (mother)
- Education: Jakarta Theological Seminary (S.Th.); University of Wisconsin–Madison (MA, PhD); University of Indonesia (Prof.)

Academic background
- Thesis: School Quality and Educational Achievement: A Study on Educational Achievement of Ninth Grade Students in Indonesia in 1976 (1978)
- Doctoral advisor: Warren O. Hagstrom

Academic work
- Discipline: Sociology

Manasse Malo Ndapatondo (2 May 1941 – 6 January 2007) was an Indonesian professor of sociology and politician. He was the dean of the University of Indonesia's Faculty of Social and Political Sciences from 1982 to 1988 and a member of the House of Representatives from 1999 to 2004.

== Early life and education ==
Malo was born on 2 May 1941 at a village in West Sumba as the child of Herman Malo Ndapatondo, the first indigenuous reverend of the Christian Church of Sumba, and Yuliana. His father was a well-known preacher in West Sumba. While he was in elementary school, Mallo recalled nominating himself for class president and being beaten 50 times by his teacher after failing to answer a math question. After finishing elementary school, he completed secondary education at the West Sumba Rara Christian Junior High School. He then moved to Salatiga in East Java and attended a Christian high school in the city.

Upon commencing high school education, Malo received a church fellowship to study theology at the Satya Wacana Christian University, and the Jakarta Theological Seminary. Malo became a student activist and joined the Indonesian Christian Student Movement (GMKI), where he became the chair of the movement's branch in Jakarta from 1962 to 1963. At the 10th congress of the movement, which was held in Manado from 12 to 28 September 1965, Malo was elected as GMKI's secretary general under chairman Kilian Sihotang.

As secretary general, Malo became one of the key figures of the anti-Sukarno student protests, although not as prominent as other GMKI members. Due to his high position in GMKI, Malo frequently travelled to other provinces to provide instruction to GMKI branches. His instructional speeches to these branches were mostly inspired by his father's sermons. He served as secretary general until the 11th congress, which was held in Makale from 17 to 30 September 1967.

After obtaining a bachelor's degree in theology from the seminary, Malo received a scholarship to study sociology at the University of Wisconsin–Madison in the United States by using his international church connections. During his time in the United States, Malo became a teaching assistant and received a number of fellowships and grant from the United States Agency for International Development, UNESCO, and Ford Foundation. He was also active in the university's Indonesian student union and was elected as its chairman. Malo earned his master's degree and doctorate from the university in 1972 and 1978, respectively. His doctorate thesis, titled School Quality and Educational Achievement: A Study on Educational Achievement of Ninth Grade Students in Indonesia in 1976, researched the willingness of final-year junior high school students to pursue further education.

== Academic career ==
Upon receiving his doctorate, Malo joined the Faculty of Social Sciences of the University of Indonesia (UI) and became a sociology lecturer. He was well-liked by student and received a "most favorite" lecturer award from the students. After a few years of lecturing, by 1981 he was named as deputy dean for academic affairs by dean Tobias Soebekti, serving in the position for the remainder of Soebekti's term until 1982. During this period, he also worked as a consultant for the Agency for the Assessment and Application of Technology and the research and development agency of the Department of Education and Culture.

=== Faculty dean ===
Tobias's term expiry in 1982 coincided with the ascension of military historian Nugroho Notosusanto as the university's rector. Nugroho appointed a number of non-UI alumni to important position in the faculty, including Malo as the faculty's dean and Ramzy Tadjudin as deputy dean for student affairs. He was installed by Nugroho for a second term on 23 February 1985, a few months before Nugroho's death.

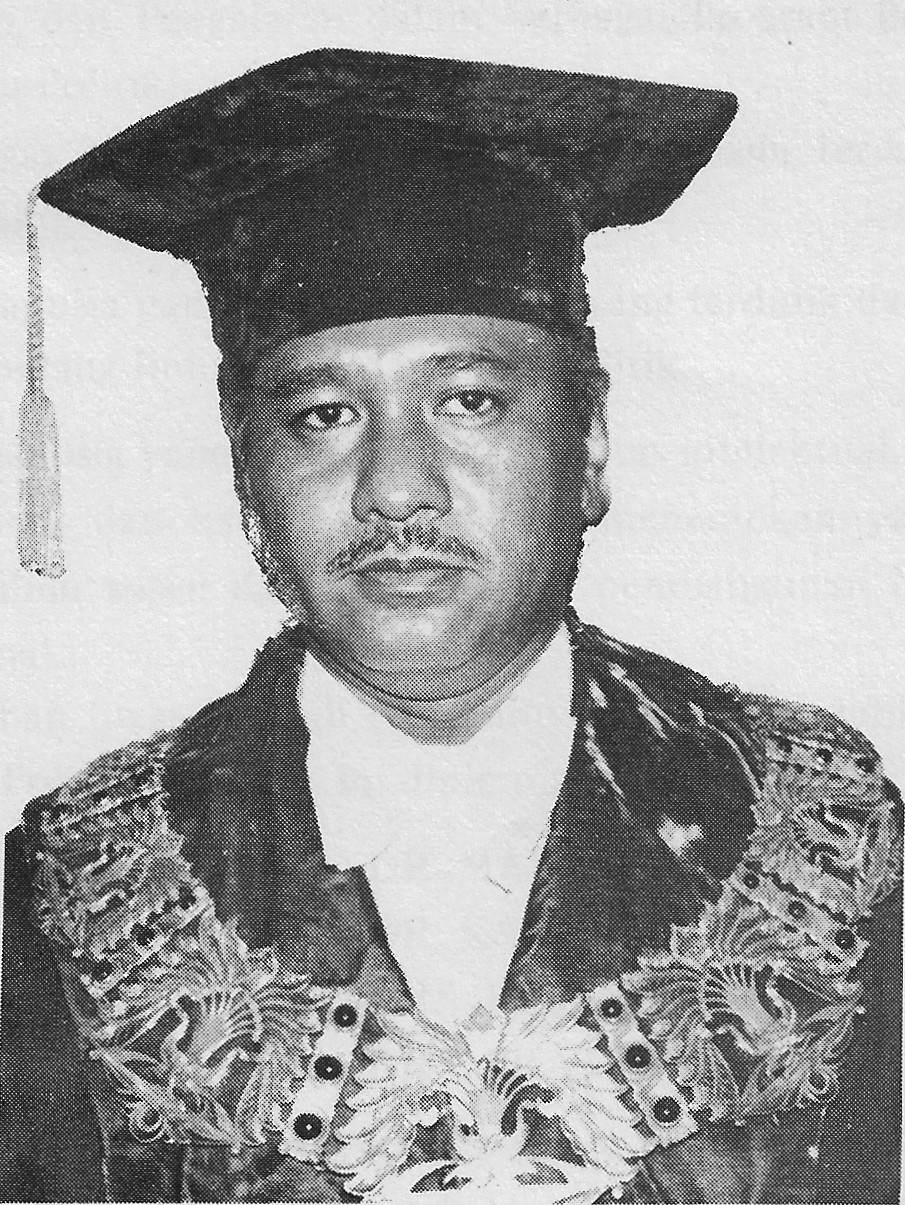
Manasse Malo in his academic robe as dean.

As dean, Malo oversaw major changes to the faculty's management and structure. Early in his term, the faculty's name was changed to the Faculty of Social and Political Sciences, in accordance with a presidential decree issued on 7 September 1982. He implemented an open management system and adjusted the faculty's academic system to the credit system. He initiated short term courses for provincial parliament members, which was part of a cooperation with the Department of Home Affairs training agency.

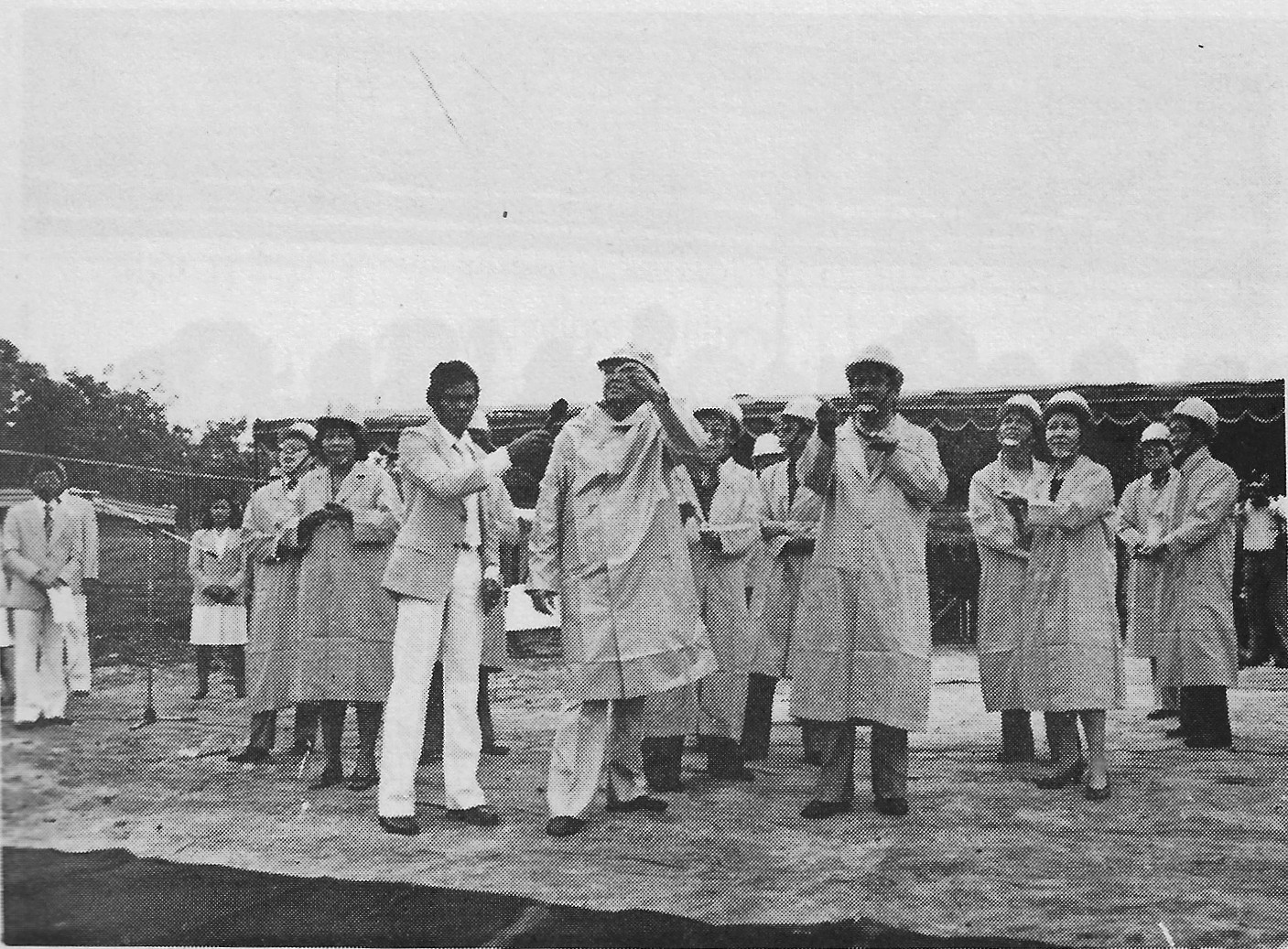
Malo (fifth from the right) pulling the foundational beams for the UI's rector building, 25 October 1984

During his tenure, two new departments became part of the faculty. The anthropology department was transferred to the faculty from the faculty of letters on 27 June 1983 and the international relations department was established in July 1985 after previously being part of the political science department. Malo ended his tenure as dean on 1 March 1988 and was replaced by Juwono Sudarsono, who would later become Indonesia's defence minister.

=== Later career ===
After his deanship, Malo continued his activity in the academia and the government. He retained his leadership of the Inter-University Center for Social Sciences, a role that he had assumed since 1986. Malo was appointed as the expert staff for socio-economic affairs to the Coordinating Minister for Economics, Finance, Industry and Development Supervision Radius Prawiro in 1989. In 1998, Malo received the Satyalancana Karya Satya, 2nd Class award and was appointed as a full professor in sociology. Outside UI and the government, Malo established the Widuri School of Social and Political Sciences and its supporting foundation, the Widuri Foundation. Malo became the chairman of the school's postgraduate programme.

== Political career ==
Malo was a member of Golkar, the ruling party during the Suharto regime in Indonesia, since 1971. Shortly after the fall of Suharto, on 5 August 1998, Malo and other Christian academics formed the Love the Nation Democratic Party. He became the party's chairman. A number of notable academia and political figure hold key positions in the party, such as former East Timor governor Mário Viegas Carrascalão as chair, former Tarumanagara University rector Dahnial Khumarga as its chief advisor, and former Director General for Food and Drugs Supervision Midian Sirait as the party's representative in the General Elections Commission. Shortly after the party was formed, the government issued a regulation which banned civil servants from joining political parties, and Malo resigned from the civil service in early 1999.

The party was registered to contest in the 1999 Indonesian legislative election on 7 June 1999, becoming one of the three Christian parties to participate in the election and the only Christian party to not explicitly mention Christianity in its name. Malo was nominated as the party's top-of-the-list candidate for the House of Representatives in East Nusa Tenggara.

Malo's notability in his hometown garnered a significant number of votes, with 31.2% of votes from his hometown in West Waijewa (Wewewa) subdistrict, and 17,000 votes from West Sumba. At the provincial level, the party received 73,551 votes, or 3.96% of the total votes, placing it third in the province in terms of the number of votes. The party's success earned Malo a seat in the House of Representatives. Malo represented his hometown, West Sumba, in the parliament.

During his tenure, Malo served as deputy chairman of the House of Representatives Sub-Commission on Domestic Affairs and Regional Autonomy. Malo was instrumental in parliamentary debates on regional autonomy and decentralisation policies. In 1999, following discussions with Umbu Dedu Ngara, then staff at the East Nusa Tenggara provincial planning agency, Malo was involved in campaigning for the creation of new regencies on the island of Sumba, particularly in advocating for the formation of Central Sumba and Southwest Sumba.

According to anthropologist Jacqueline Vel, Malo, Ngara, and an army officer named Markus Dairo Talu were the main actors in campaigning for the creation of new regencies in Sumba. As a parliament member, Malo bridged local interests in Sumba with the national policy process in Jakarta. His high position in the parliament allowed him to act as both a source of strategic advice and a gatekeeper to bureaucratic contacts crucial for the district formation campaign. He was considered a strong supporter of turning Sumba into its own province, a vision that required subdividing existing districts, and in this regard he aspired to the position of governor if the province were realised. Malo’s lobbying work involved mobilising elite and grassroots support, orchestrating petition campaigns, and encouraging delegations from Sumba to present their case in Jakarta. He offered guidance on procedural steps and practical lobbying tactics, such as personal advocacy with parliamentary commissions, and remained a key contact and advisor throughout various stages of the campaign.

== Personal life ==
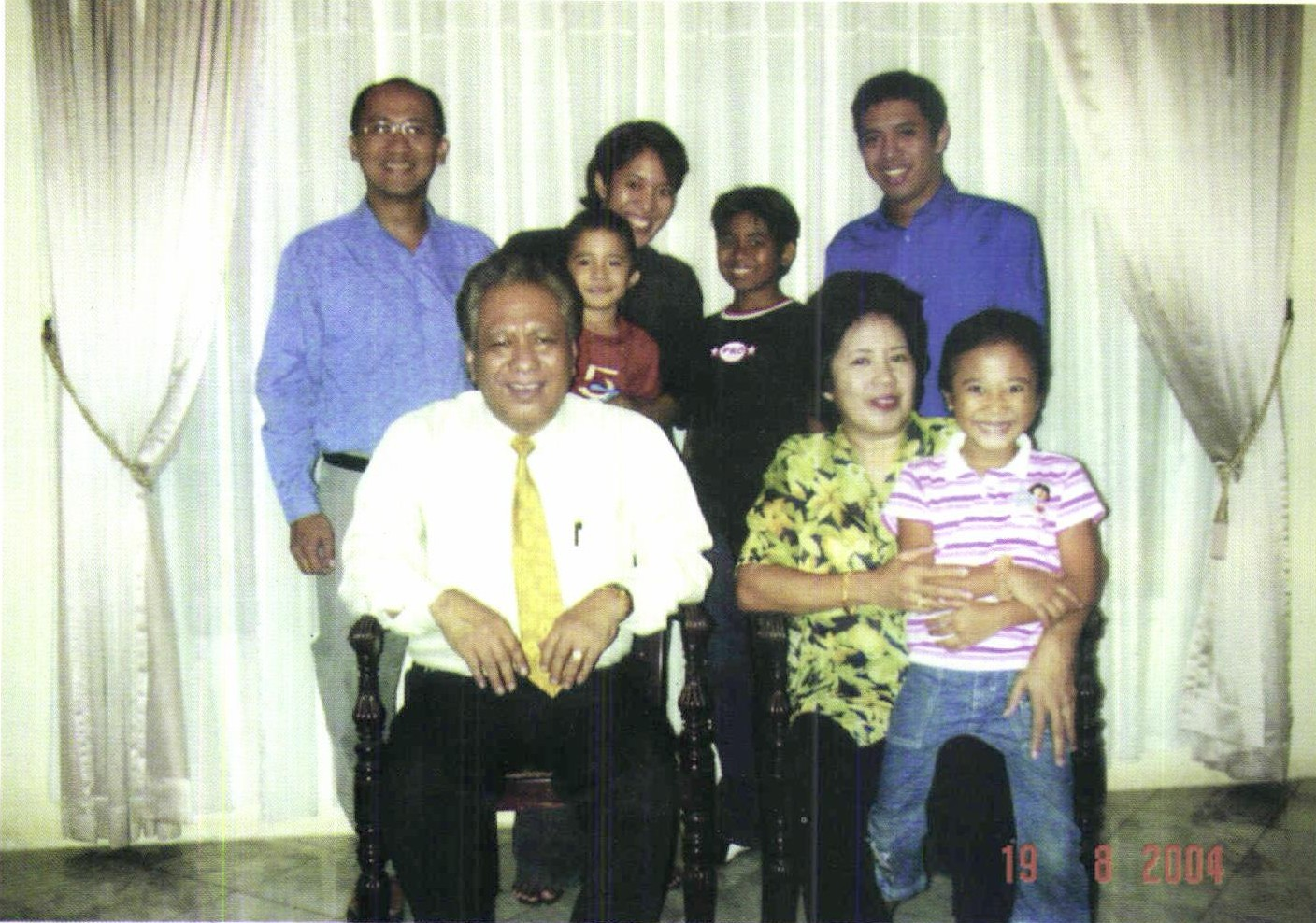
Malo with his family, 19 August 2004

Malo was married to Tashya Umboh and has a daughter and two sons. His eldest son, Yefta Malo, died in 2005.

Manasse died at the age of 66 in his hometown of Waingapu, Sumba Timur, on the morning of 6 January 2007. A day before his death, he suffered a stroke that left him in a coma. At the time of his death, he was slated to serve as a family guardian at his nephew's wedding in Bali.

A street near the university's campus in Depok and a library at the Widuri School of Social and Political Sciences is named after him.
