= Waibakul =

Capital of Central Sumba Regency, Indonesia

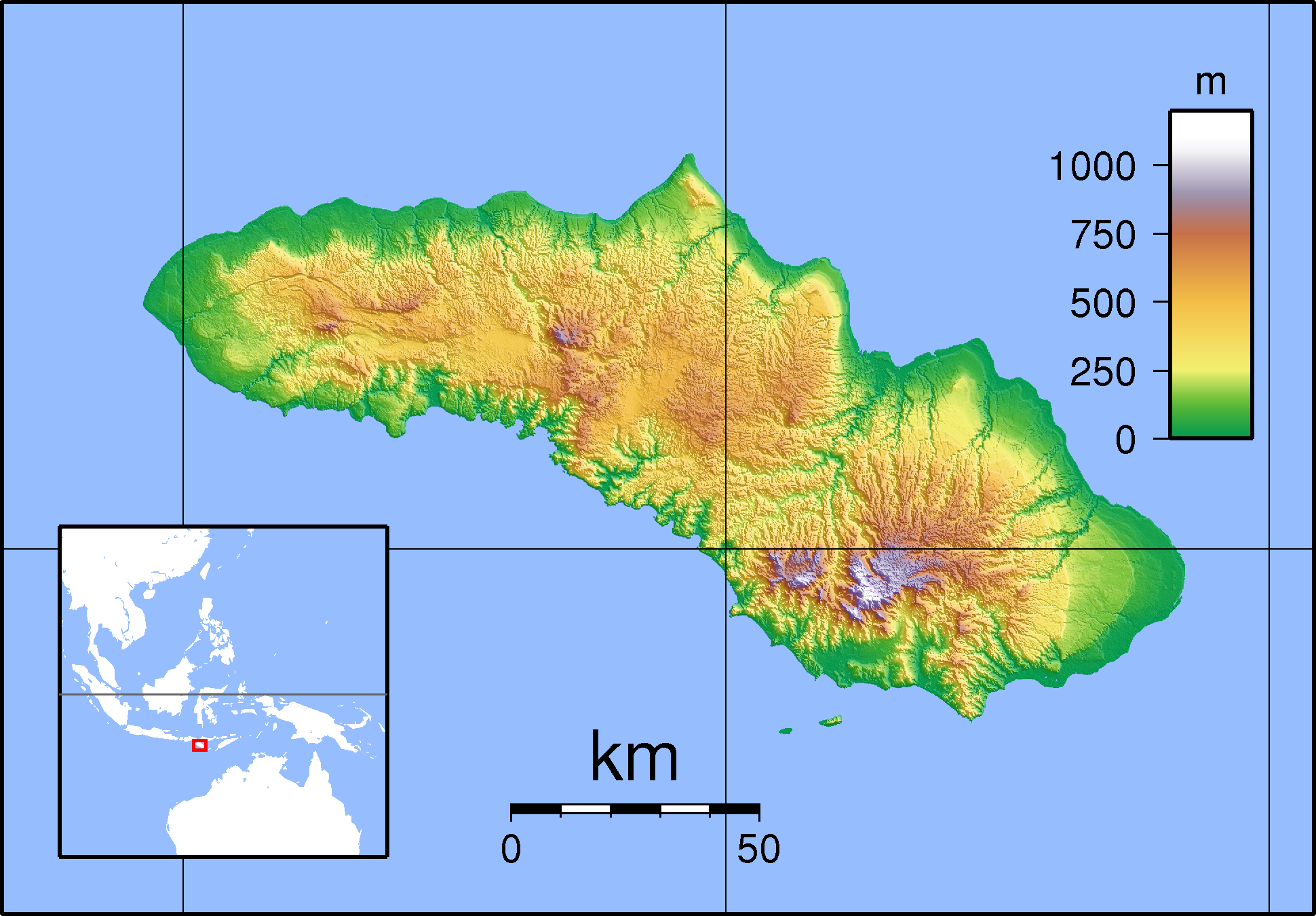
- Location in Indonesia Waibakul (Indonesia)
- Country: Indonesia
- Region: Lesser Sunda Islands
- Province: East Nusa Tenggara
- Regency: Central Sumba
- Time zone: UTC+8 (WITA / UTC)

Waibakul is a town on Sumba island, in East Nusa Tenggara province of Indonesia and the seat (capital) of Central Sumba Regency.

The town has limited infrastructure, with four nearby ATMs, one fuel station, and one healthcare center.

== Location ==
Waibakul is in the middle of the western part of Sumba island, on the road that links Tambolaka (58 kilometres or 36 miles to the north-west) to Waingapu (107 kilometres or 66 miles to the east).
