= Theo Waimuri =

Indonesian diplomat and politician

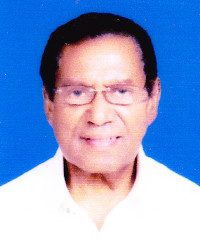

Ambassador of Indonesia to Namibia
- In office 19 February 1999 – 31 July 2003; Chargé d'affaires en pied until 3 May 2002
- Preceded by: Odjahan Marc Enos Silalahi as chargé d'affaires
- Succeeded by: Gde Putu Artisme

Personal details
- Born: 8 May 1946 (age 79) Serui, Papua, Dutch East Indies
- Spouse: Loesje Adi Wardhana
- Children: 3
- Education: Universitas 17 Agustus 1945 Jakarta (Drs.)

Theofilus Waimuri (born 8 May 1946) is an Indonesian diplomat and politician who served as Indonesia's top representative in Namibia, serving as chargé d'affaires en pied from 1999 to 2002 and as ambassador from 2002 to 2003. Prior to his assignment, he served in a number of Indonesian representatives abroad, including at the permanent mission to the United Nations and the embassy in Washington.

== Early life and education ==
Born on 8 May 1946 in Serui, Papua, Waimuri spent his early years there before moving to Yogyakarta for high school. After completing his secondary education, he moved to Jakarta to attend Universitas 17 Agustus 1945, where he studied politics and earned his bachelor's degree in 1974. During his student years, he joined the Indonesian Christian Student Movement and was active as the Chairman of the Papuan Student Press in Jakarta from 1964 to 1973. Waimuri was also active in the Union of Irian Barat Students (Persatuan Pemuda Peladjar dan Mahasiswa asal Irian Barat, P3MIB) and in August 1967 led a P3MIB delegation to meet with education minister Sarino Mangunpranoto.

== Diplomatic career ==
Waimuri began his 1977 as a staff to Irian Jaya governor Soetran, where he became the chief of protocol and liaison. Like most civil servants during the Suharto period, he joined Golkar, the government's party. The following year, he was appointed as the chief of people's welfare to the governor. After passing a test for basic diplomatic education at the foreign service school in 1979, he was admitted and completed his diplomatic education in 1980. On 1 July 1982, he was assigned to Indonesia's permanent mission to the United Nations in New York, becoming the first Papuan to serve there. He resigned from Golkar upon his posting in New York.

While at the UN, he served as a member of Commission IV, which discussed decolonization issues, including the issue of East Timor. He also served on the Special Political Committee, which was responsible for Palestinian affairs, information, and the UN's mandate to special forces like the United Nations Temporary Executive Authority (UNTEA). During his time there, he delivered a speech before the UN forum titled The Government of the Republic of Indonesia Appeals to Israel to Observe the Human Rights of the Palestinian. Waimuri was also appointed by the permanent representative Ali Alatas to attend a United Nations Economic and Social Council conference and meeting of Commission XXIV.

=== Assignment in Washington ===
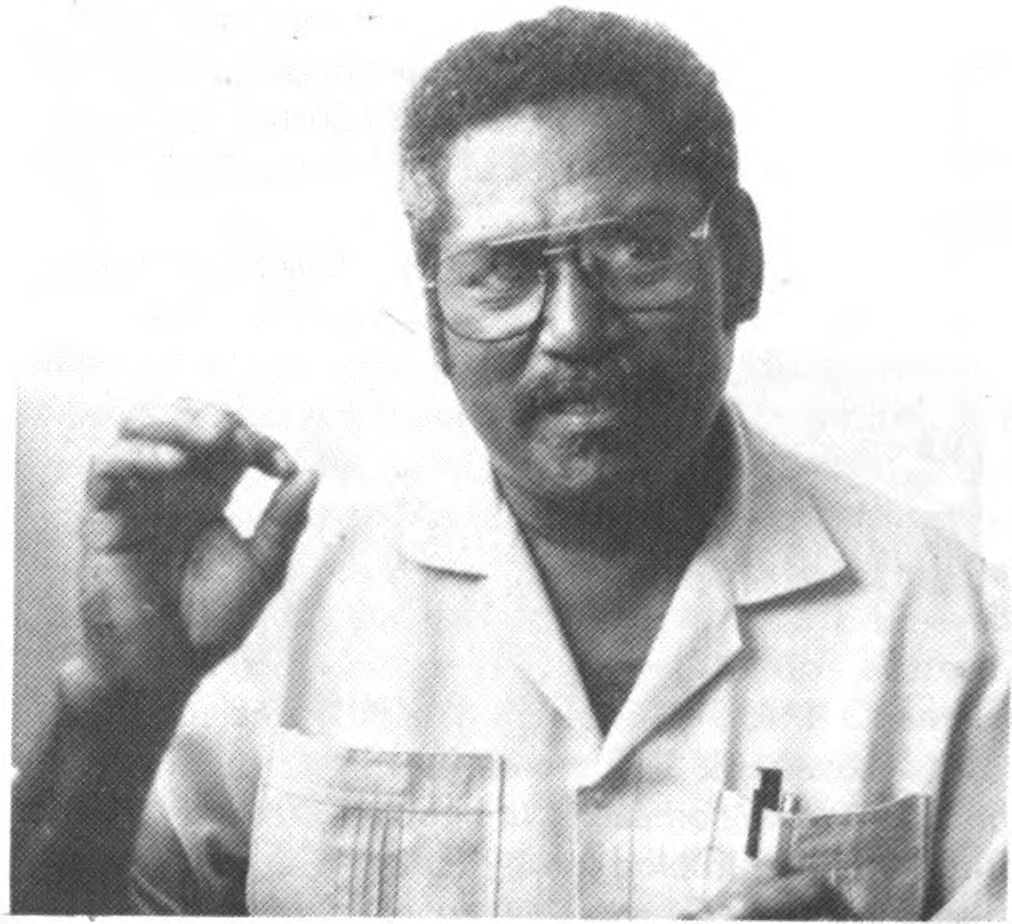
Waimuri in 1987.

After his four-year assignment in New York ended in 1986, Waimuri returned to the foreign department as a staff in the directorate of Asia-Pacific Affairs. He served as deputy director (chief of subdirectorate) for visas and expatriate before being assigned to the embassy in Washington D.C. as the chief of protocol and consular affairs with the rank of counsellor. From 1995 to 1996, Waimuri became the president of the consular corps in Washington. In 1993, Waimuri announced his candidacy for the Irian Jaya governor but was not selected as a candidate.

During his tenure, Waimuri caused a fuss for his statement of apology to Minnie Osmeña in light of her altercation with Dewi Sukarno. In the altercation, Sukarno slashed Osmeña's face with a wine glass, resulting in Osmeña's face needing 37 stitches. A reporter who called Waimuri misinterpreted Waimuri's apology as behalf of the Indonesian government, even though he intended it as an apology on behalf of himself and Dewi Sukarno. Waimuri was reprimanded for his statement by the foreign ministry's information director, and the embassy issued an official statement that the government never officially apologized to Osmeña.

Aside from his official duties in Washington, Waimuri also advocated for Papuan rights. Waimuri successfully lobbied American Samoa's delegate to the U.S. House of Representatives Eni Faleomavaega to bring attention to the plight of the Papuan people. Faleomavaega began to advocate for the rights of indigenous Papuans in the U.S. Congress, with his efforts culminating in a meeting with Indonesian President Susilo Bambang Yudhoyono on 4 July 2007.

After serving in Washington, from 1997 to 1999 Waimuri served as the assistant for East African affairs to the deputy for foreign cooperation in the coordinating minister for political and security office.

=== Ambassador to Namibia ===
On 19 February 1999, Waimuri assumed duties as Indonesia's chargé d'affaires en pied to Namibia in Windhoek. At his inauguration, Waimuri was instructed by foreign minister Ali Alatas to maintain and deepen Indonesia-Namibia relations, explore joint ventures involving Indonesian, South African, and Namibian businesses, revive broadcasting cooperation agreements, enhance Indonesia's image, and support technical cooperation that already had Namibia involved. Waimuri became the treasurer of the diplomatic corps in Windhoek from 1999 to 2003.

In 2000, Waimuri ran as a candidate for the Irian Jaya governor, with bureaucrat Sabirin Harahap as his running mate. Waimuri lost the election, receiving only a single vote out of the 45 votes cast. The next year, Waimuri was named as a candidate for minister in Megawati Sukarnoputri's Mutual Assistance Cabinet.

Waimuri's diplomatic rank was elevated from a chargé d'affaires to ambassador, and he was installed as ambassador on 3 May 2002. From 14 to 18 May 2002, the embassy held the Indonesia Expo 2002 (Trade, Tourism and Investment Forum) at Windhoek, which was opened by President of Namibia Sam Nujoma. The expo aimed at reducing reliance of Namibia traders on third-party trade routes and encourage Indonesian businesses to bypass intermediaries and engage directly with Namibian buyers and distributors. Beyond Waimuri's expectation, the expo gained massive attention and attracted businesspeople from not only Namibia, but also from neighboring countries like Tanzania, Angola, and South Africa, with Kompas in its editorial describing it as a "shocking breakthrough". About a month after the event, on 3 July Waimuri presented his credentials to Nujoma. On 31 July 2003, Waimuri was dismissed from his ambassadorship after being reported by the State Civil Service Agency for financial misappropriation.

== Later career ==
After being dismissed from the foreign service, Waimuri was nominated for the 2004 Indonesian legislative election by his brother, who was the vice chairman of the Democratic Party's Papua chapter, to fulfill the party's quota. He was nominated as a House of Representatives from the party for the Papua electoral district and received 1,186 votes. He did not pass the threshold for a seat in the House of Representatives.

=== General Elections Commission nomination ===
In 2007, Waimuri ran as a member of the General Elections Commission. As one of the prerequisites for the membership was to not have any affiliation with a political party for the last five years, Waimuri obtained a statement from Golkar's office in Jakarta, claiming that he had not been a party member for the last five years. However, his candidacy in 2004 was revealed during the latter stage of the selection process. In a public debate of General Elections Commission candidates on 27 September 2007, Waimuri stated that he was unknowingly nominated in 2004 and argued that he technically did not violate the law, as the law only barred political party members, not legislative candidates from political parties. Waimuri delivered the same remark during his questioning by House of Representatives on the same day prior to his assessment on 1 October.

Waimuri's insistence on going ahead with his candidacy sparked controversy amongst the House of Representatives second commission members who was responsible for assessing General Elections Commission candidates, with some members threatening to walk out if he was allowed to undergo a fit and proper test. In the end, the commission members decided to assess him in respect to the president who nominated him, even though the commission had already decided unanimously to disqualify him before the assessment took place. Waimuri, which was originally scheduled to undergo the assessment on the last day, was rescheduled to the first day. Evert Ernest Mangindaan, the commission's chairman, stated that the rescheduling was for immediate clarification, while M. Nasil Jamil, a commission member who strongly protested Waimuri's nomination, stated that the rescheduling was to allow a swift disqualification. One hour into his assessment, Waimuri received harsh criticism from commission members who accused him of lying to the public, with three members walking out of the session. Waimuri's assessment was discontinued by Mangindaan, and Waimuri accepted this decision sincerely, expressing his intention to run as a vice-presidential candidate instead.

=== Democratic Party and Regional Representative Council nomination ===
After being rejected from the General Elections Commission, Waimuri re-joined the Democratic Party under Anas Urbaningrum, serving as the secretary of the party's foreign affairs division from 2010 to 2015. During this period, Waimuri served as advisor to the transport minister and to the coordinating minister for people's welfare. Waimuri ran as a senator for Papua in the 2014 Indonesian legislative election, but his nomination was rejected due to administrative errors.

=== Transport ministry investigation ===
In March 2015, the Corruption Eradication Commission questioned as a witness in a corruption case related to the construction of the Seafarer Education and Training Center in Sorong, Papua in 2011. In this case, the former General Manager of Hutama Karya, Budi Rachmat Kurniawan, was indicted for allegedly causing a state loss of Rp40.193 billion by inflating the project's budget. The indictment revealed that Budi had sought Waimuri's help, who was then a special advisor to the transport minister, to lobby for PT Hutama Karya to win the project. According to the indictment, Waimuri promised to influence the chief of human resources development in the transport ministry Bobby Reynold Mamahit to ensure the company win the tender. The indictment stated Waimuri received Rp311.798 million from the collusion.

== Personal life ==
Theo Waimuri is married to Loesje Adi Wardhana from Cirebon, West Java. The couple has three children. Waimuri expressed a wish to be buried in a coffin wrapped in the Morning Star flag, the symbol of Papuan independence, regardless of whether Papua was independent or not.

Theo is a recipient of the Satya Lencana Karya, 1st class from the president for his 30 years of civil service.
