= Tarung =

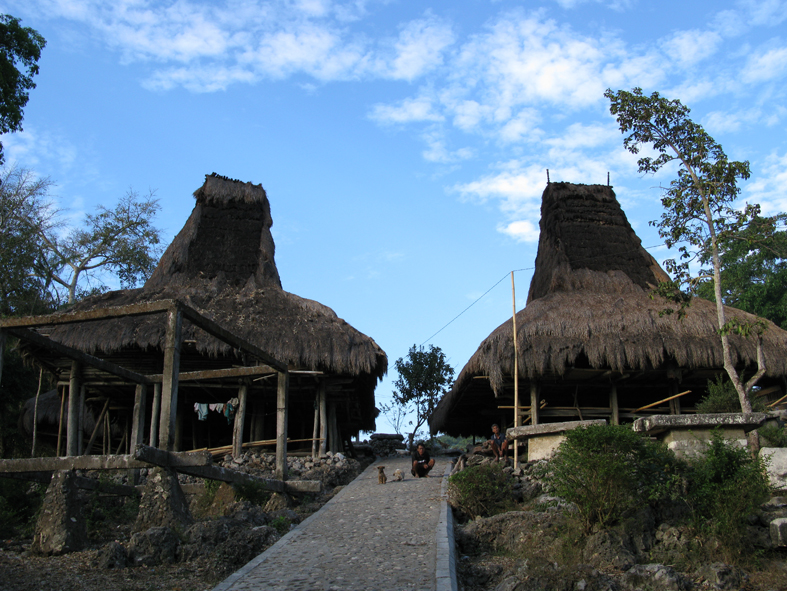
- Houses in Tarung, Waitabar

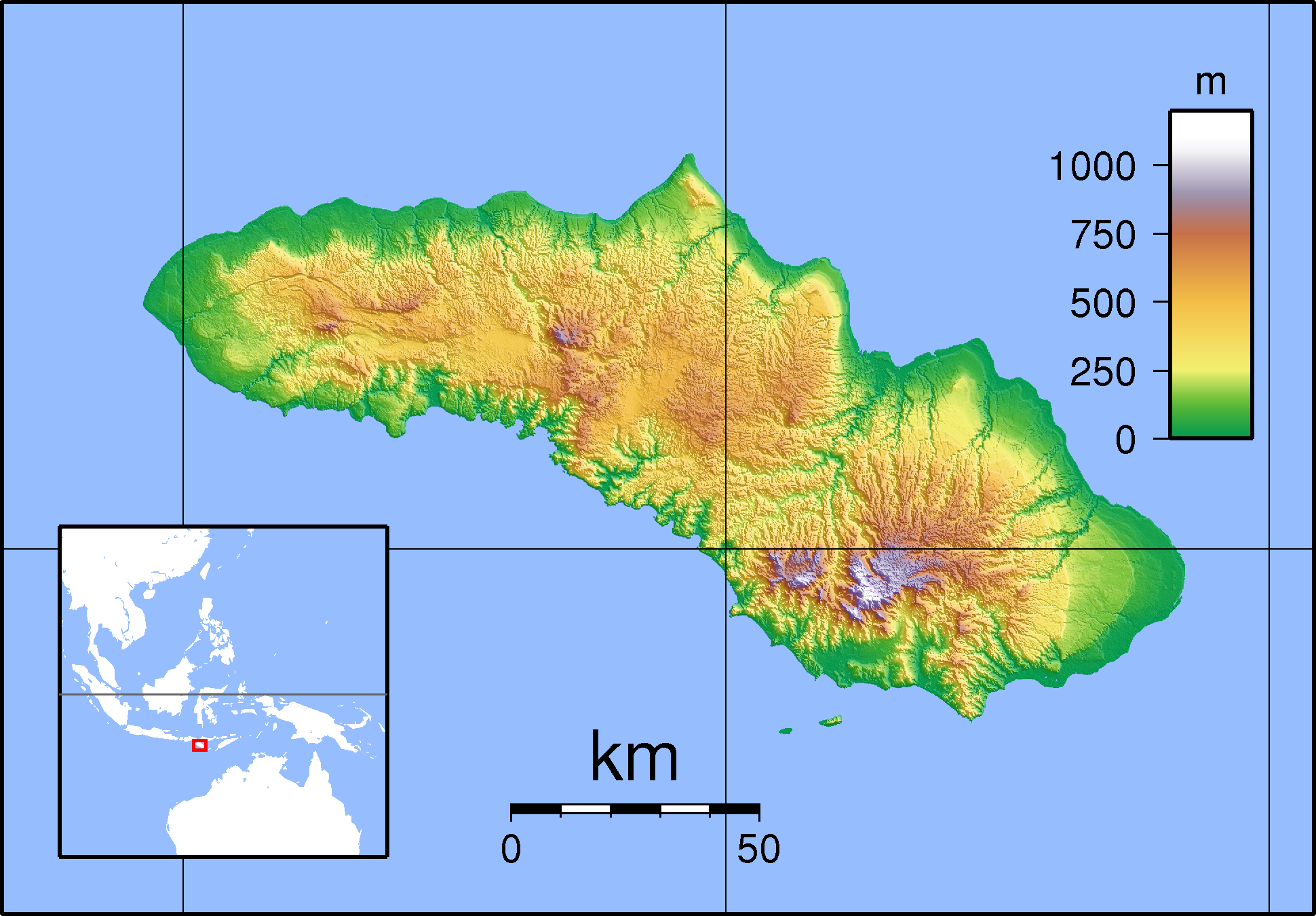
- Location in Indonesia Tarung (Indonesia)
- Country: Indonesia
- Region: Lesser Sunda Islands
- Province: East Nusa Tenggara
- Regency: West Sumba
- Time zone: UTC+8 (WITA / UTC)

Tarung, (Dutch: Taroeng) is a populated area in Waikabubak, West Sumba, Indonesia. Tarung is home to the ritual of Wula Podhu, a several-week period of austere rites and rituals in November that ends with a day of offerings, song and dance.

The village features over 40 traditional houses. These houses are known as 'menara' and are constructed with bamboo walls and alang roofs that stretch towards the sky. There is a clan house att the center of the village, where the rato lives and preserves artefacts from the island's ancient past.

Other structures at the center include Uma Weekada (a place for horses), Uma Mawinne (a place for women to sing), Uma Mediata (a place for singing traditional songs), Ana Uma Wara (the storage area for traditional machetes), and Ana Uma Dara (the main house of rituals).

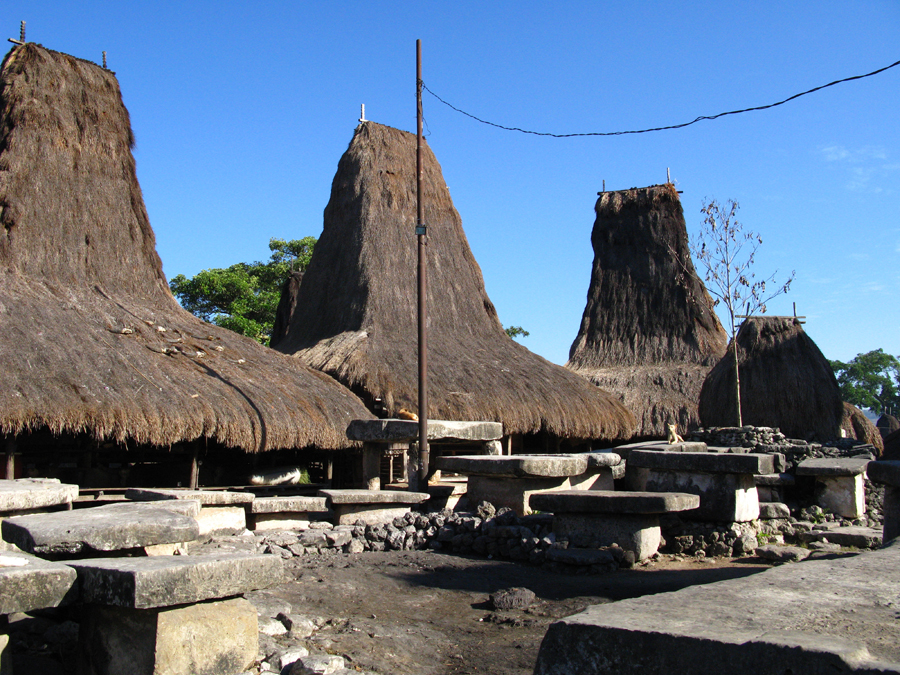

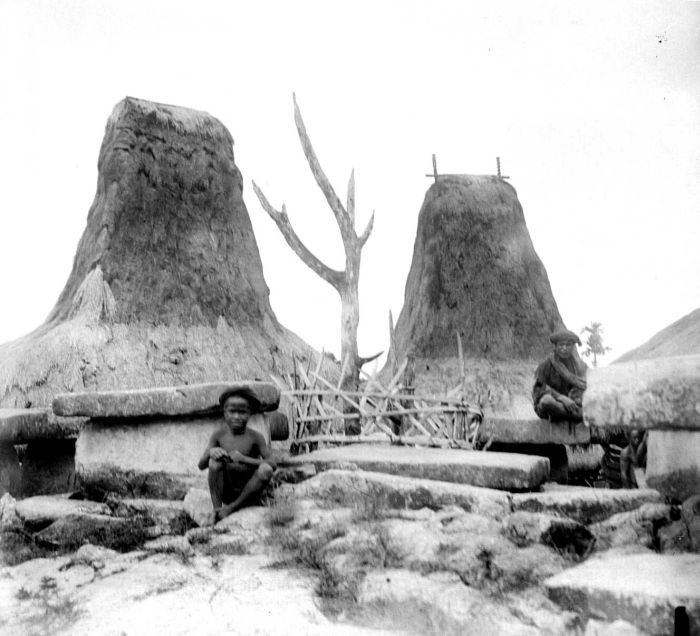
A dead tree worship site in Taroeng (Tarung), West-Sumba
