= Central Sumba Regency =

Regency in East Nusa Tenggara, Indonesia

Central Sumba Regency Kabupaten Sumba Tengah
- Regency
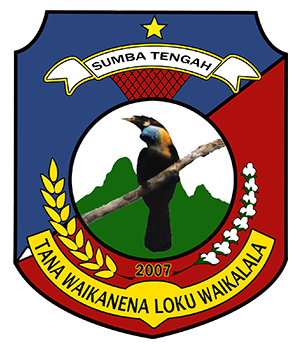
- Coat of arms

- Location within East Nusa Tenggara

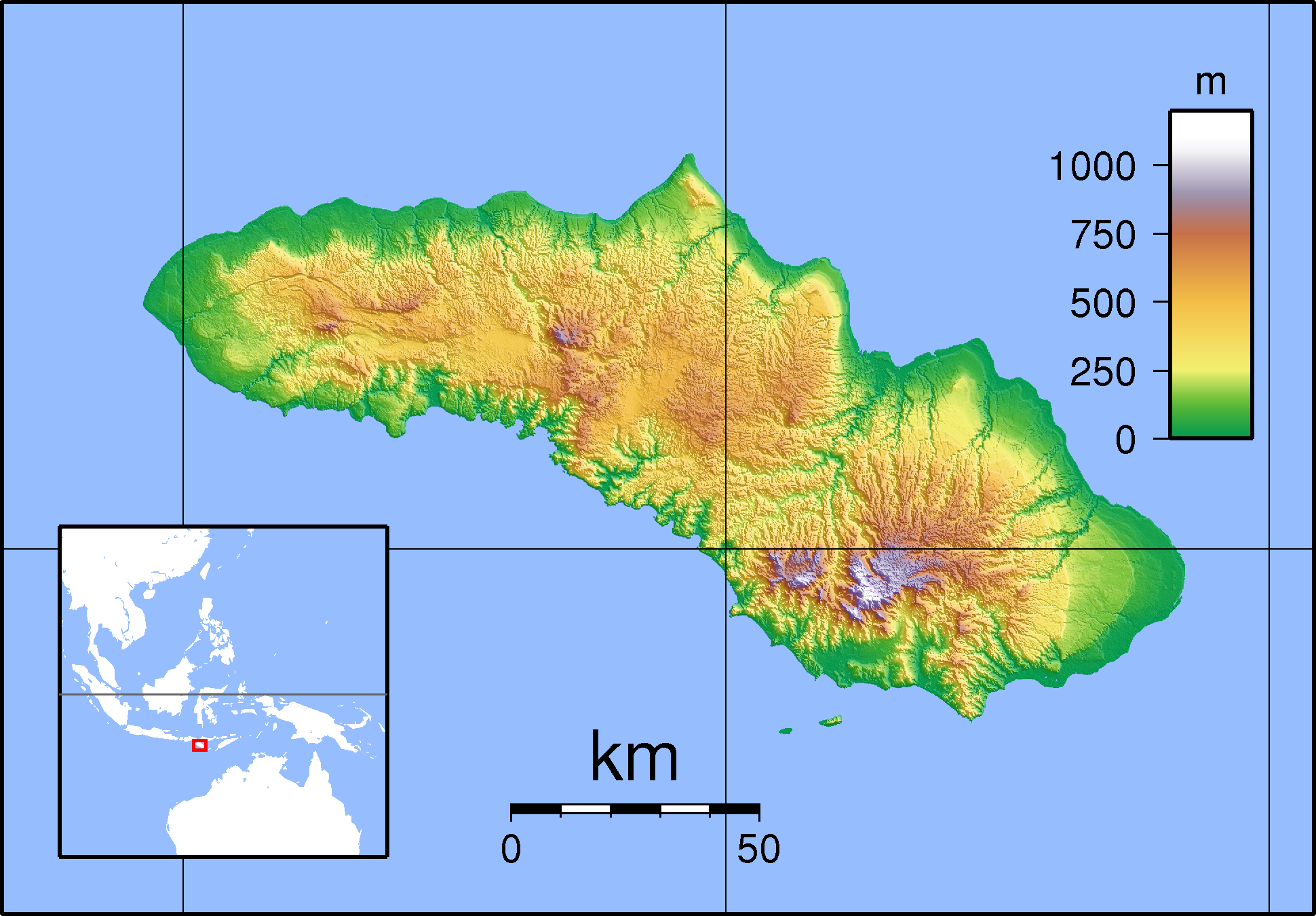
- Location in Sumba, Lesser Sunda Islands and Indonesia Central Sumba Regency (Lesser Sunda Islands) Central Sumba Regency (Indonesia)
- Coordinates: 9.6294°S 119.6191°E
- Country: Indonesia
- Region: Lesser Sunda Islands
- Province: East Nusa Tenggara
- Capital: Waibakul

Government
  - Regent: Paulus Sekayu Karugu Limu
  - Vice Regent: Marthinus Umbu Djoka

Area
  - Total: 1,789.69 km^{2} (691.00 sq mi)

Population (mid 2025 estimate)
  - Total: 94,187
  - Density: 52.628/km^{2} (136.30/sq mi)
- Area code: (+62) 386
- Website: sumbatengahkab.go.id

Central Sumba Regency (Indonesian: Kabupaten Sumba Tengah) is a regency in East Nusa Tenggara of Indonesia. The new Central Sumba Regency was established on the island of Sumba when West Sumba Regency was split into two regencies on 22 May 2007 and a further Regency was created in Central Sumba from parts of both West Sumba and East Sumba Regencies. The new Regency covers 1,789.69 km^{2} and had a population of 62,485 at the 2010 Census and 85,482 at the 2020 Census; the official estimate as of mid-2025 was 94,187 (comprising 48,274 males and 45,913 females). The seat (capital) of its government is located at Waibakul.

== Administrative districts ==
The Central Sumba Regency (following the re-organisation on 22 May 2007 which created it out of parts of both West Sumba Regency and East Sumba Regency) was composed of five districts (kecamatan), but a sixth district (Umbu Ratu Nggay Tengah) has since been created by taking 7 villages from Umbu Ratu Nggay District and 3 villages from Umbu Ratu Nggay Barat District. The areas (in km^{2}) and populations of these districts at the 2010 Census and the 2020 Census are listed below, together with the official estimates as of mid-2025. The table also includes the locations of the district administrative centres, the number of administrative villages in each district (all classed as rural desa), and its postal code.

Katikutana District (which borders Waikabubak in neighbouring West Sumba Regency to the west) and South Kalikutana District are situated in the south of the Regency, and include much of Manupeu Tanah Daru National Park; Mamboro District and the Umbu Ratu Nggay districts are to the north, with Mamboro village serving as a port on the island's north coast.

Kode Wilayah	Name of District (kecamatan)	Area in km^{2}	Pop'n Census 2010	Pop'n Census 2020	Pop'n Estimate mid 2025	Admin centre	No. of villages	Post code
53.17.01	Katikutana	64.88	9,733	13,837	15,524	Anakalang	7	87282
53.17.05	Katikutana Selatan (South Kalikutana)	317.46	10,095	14,755	16,777	Waikabeti	9	87280
53.17.02	Umbu Ratu Nggay Barat (West Umbu Ratu Nggay)	244.44	16,223	21,507	20,192	Maderi	15	87281
53.17.04	Umbu Ratu Nggay	619.73	12,264	16,306	12,261	Lendi Wacu	11	87283
53.17.06	Umbu Ratu Nggay Tengah (Central Umbu Ratu Nggay)	217.11	^{(a)}	^{(a)}	8,588	Bolubokat	10	87283
53.17.03	Mamboro	326.97	14,170	19,077	20,845	Mananga	13	87258
	Totals	1,789.69	62,485	85,482	94,187	Waibakul	65	

Note: (a) The populations at the 2010 and 2020 Censuses of the villages now forming the new Central Umbu Ratu Nggay District are included with the figures for the two districts from which they were cut out.

== See also ==
- List of regencies and cities of Indonesia
