= Marianne Katoppo =

Indonesian novelist, feminist theologian

- Born: Henriette Marianne Katoppo; 9 June 1943; Tomohon, North Sulawesi, Indonesia
- Died: 12 October 2007 (aged 64); Bogor
- Education: Jakarta Theological Seminary
- Occupations: Novelist; Theologian
- Notable work: Raumanen (novel); Compassionate and Free. An Asian Woman's Theology

Henriette Marianne Katoppo (9 June 1943 – 12 October 2007) was an Indonesian novelist and internationally known Asian feminist theologian. She was a recipient of the S.E.A. Write Award.

== Career ==
Born in Tomohon, North Sulawesi, on 9 June 1943, Katoppo studied theology from 1963 at the Jakarta Theological Seminary, Sekolah Tinggi Teologi.

In 1979, Katoppo spoke about "Asian Theology: An Asian Woman's Perspective" at the first Asian Theological Conference in Sri Lanka. She served the ecumenical idea as a member of the Ecumenical Association of Third World Theologians (EATWOT), and was part of the executive committee of the Indonesian National Council of Churches (PGI). She has been described as "independent, forthright, and conversant in a dozen Asian and European languages," and was internationally known as a female theologian.

Katoppo died in Bogor on 12 October 2007.

== Writing ==
Katoppo's Christian novel Raumanen, published in 1977, won the first prize at the Jakarta Arts Council Novel Competition. Her book Compassionate and Free. An Asian Woman's Theology was published in 1980 by Orbis and translated into Dutch and German. It was one of the first books to present an Asian feminist theology which used Asian myths and stories to interpret theology, and supports an image of God also as a mother.

Because Katoppo considered her work apolitical and did not want it thought of as having any feminist political agenda, she believed the term "feminist theology" to be "too loaded." Susan Evangelista of Ateneo de Manila University summarized Katoppo's perspective of the Virgin Mary as being the core of "women's theology"; and rather than being limited to the role of the virgin mother of Jesus, Evangelista believes Katoppo saw Mary as a totally complete woman who, while obedient to God, serves as the perfect balance to men.

== Publications ==
- Katoppo, Marianne (1980). Compassionate and Free: An Asian Woman's Theology. Maryknoll, NY: Orbis Books. ISBN 978-0-88344-085-8.
- Katoppo, Marianne (1978). Terbangnya Punai. Jakarta: Pustaka Sinar Harapan.
- Katoppo, Marianne (1977). Anggrek Tak Pernah Berdusta. Jakarta: Gaya Favorit Press.
- Katoppo, Marianne (1977). Raumanen. Jakarta: Gaya Favorit Press.
- Katoppo, Marianne (1974). Dunia Tak Bermusim. Jakarta: Sinar Harapan.
