= Waikabubak =

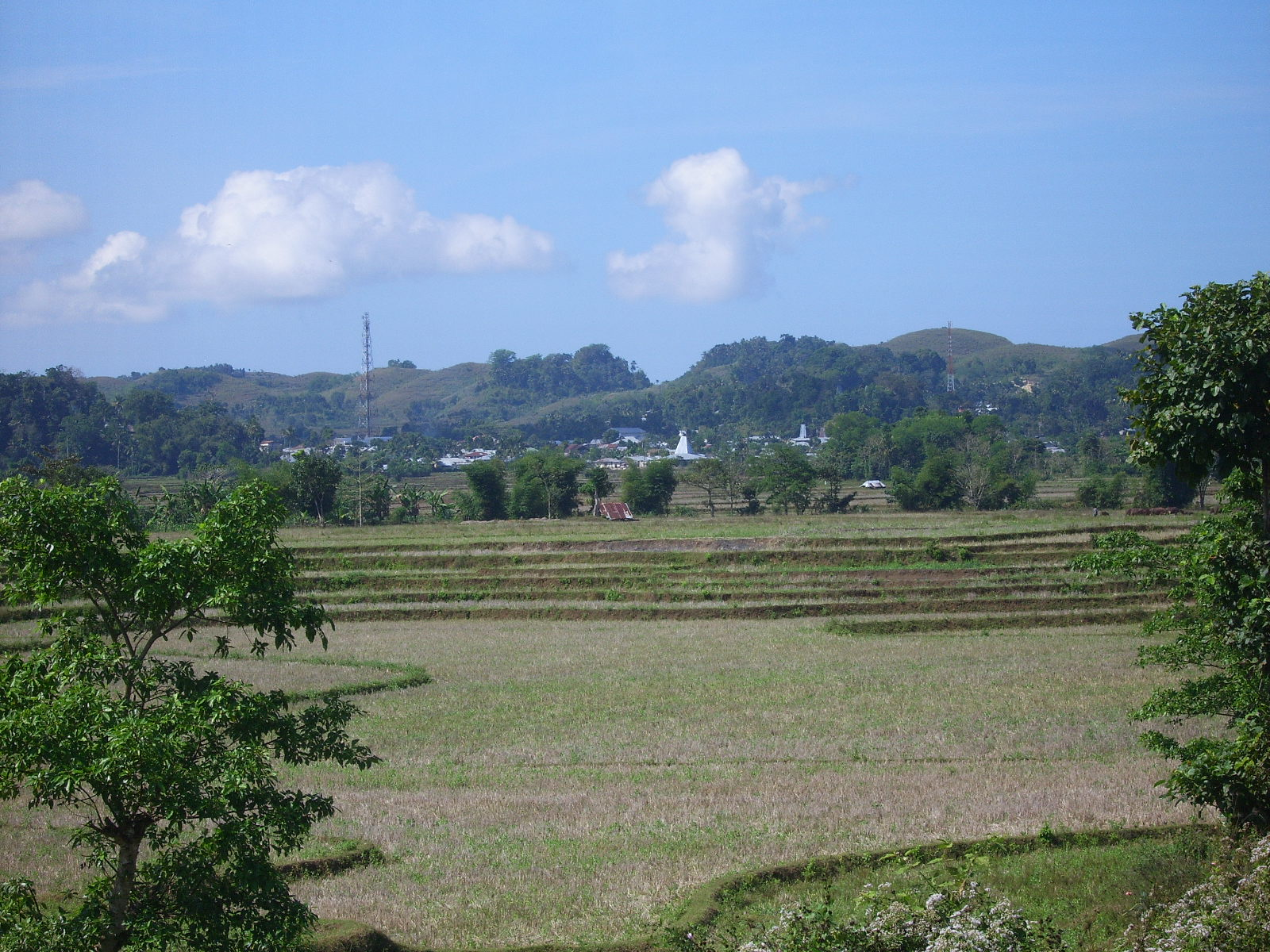
- Waikabubak

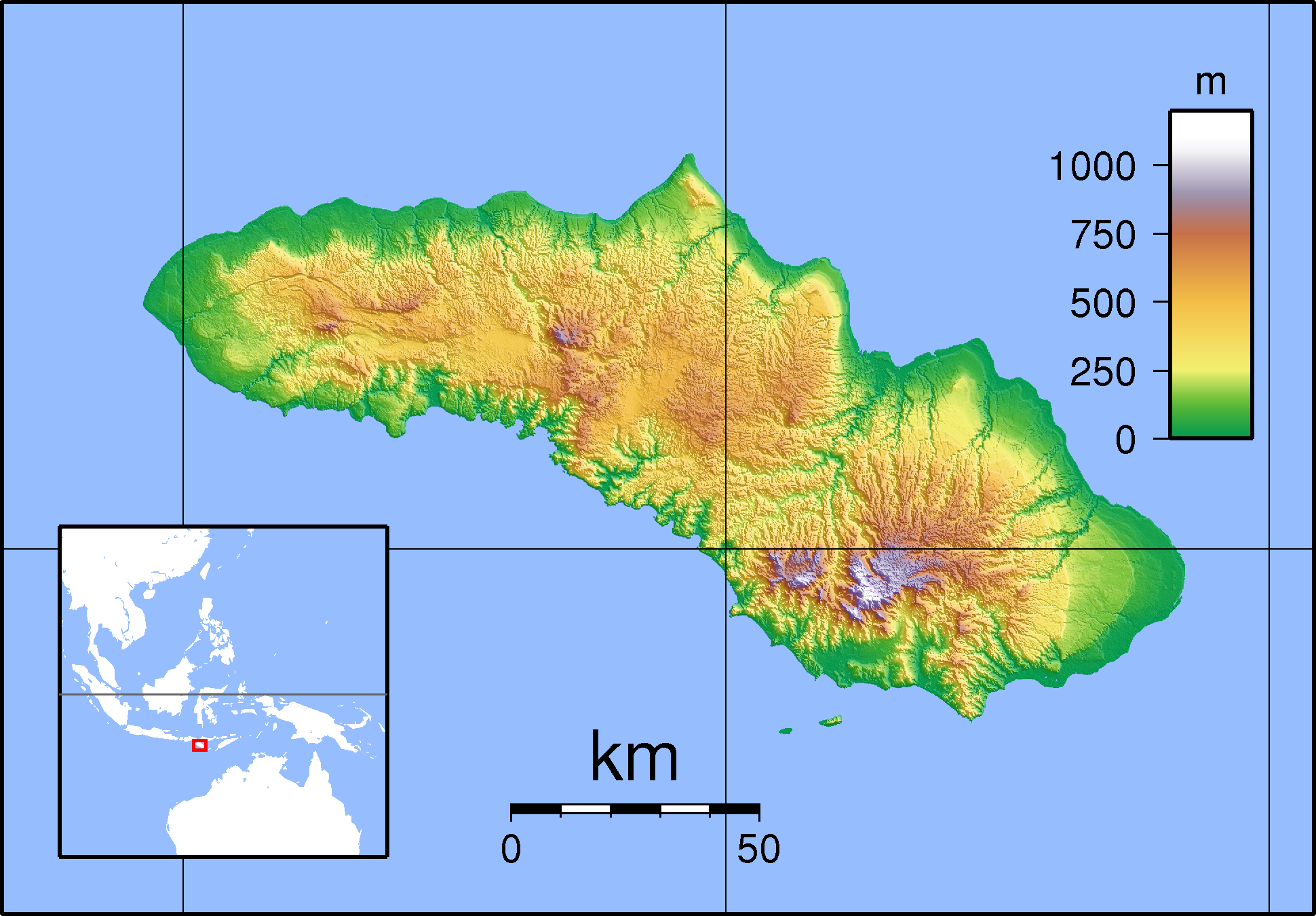
- Location in Indonesia Waikabubak (Indonesia)
- Country: Indonesia
- Region: Lesser Sunda Islands
- Province: East Nusa Tenggara
- Regency: West Sumba

Area
  - Total: 44.71 km^{2} (17.26 sq mi)

Population (2020)
  - Total: 28,564
- Time zone: UTC+8 (WITA / UTC)

Waikabubak is a town on the island of Sumba, in the East Nusa Tenggara province of Indonesia, and is the capital of the West Sumba Regency. Initially a part of the Kupang Regency, Waikabubak was made capital of South West Sumba in 1913. In 2002, around 6% of the island's population lives in the village while 38% of its civil service did as well.

== Etymology ==
The name Waikabubak comes from the name of a spring in the area. Wai means "water" and kabubak means "bubbling sound" and when combined they produced "water which makes a bubbling sound".

== Geography ==
Waikabubak is an inland village located on the western portion of the island of Sumba. There are springs in the area around the town.

== History ==
The first hospital was opened by Christian missionaries in 1925. The first Christian secondary school was opened in 1947. H.M. Malo, the father of Manasse Malo, was the first Sumbese reverend in Waikabubak. Currently, the town houses the island's oldest and largest church.

Dozens of people were killed in Waikabubak during the May 1998 riots.

Waikabubak was the only place that telephone services were offered in West Sumba in 2002.

== Government ==
Sumba was made a part of the Kupang Regency in 1875, with Waingapu as the capital. Waikabubak was selected as capital of the South West Sumba after the Dutch military suppressed opposition in 1913, and it is now the capital of the West Sumba Regency.

== Demographics ==
The town had a population of 23,000 in 2002, which was 6.2% of the total population of the regency. 38% of the regency's civil servants and teachers resided in Waikabubak. The town has a population of 28,564 as of 2020.

== Gallery ==
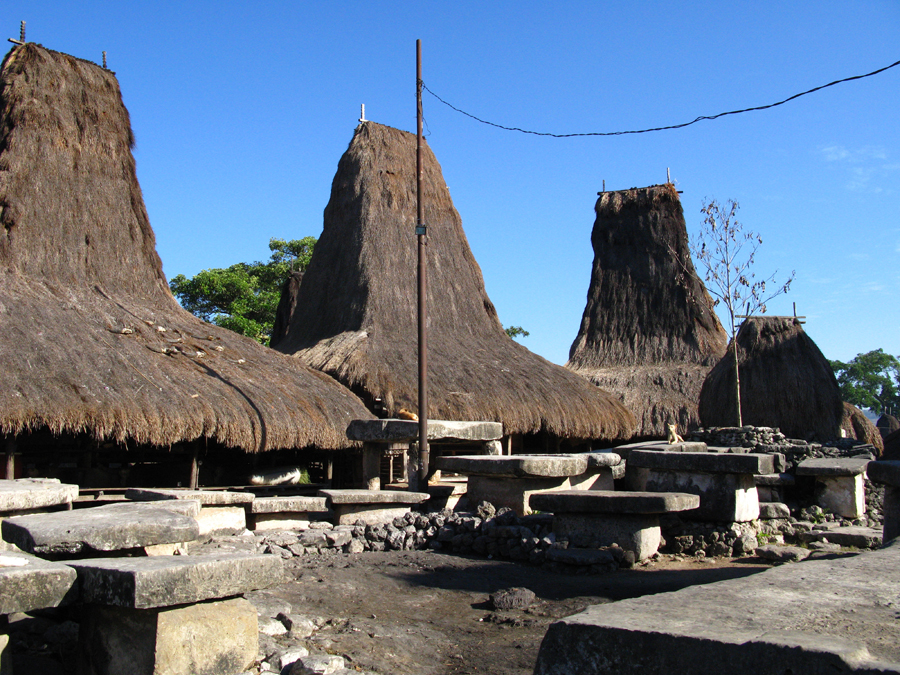
The traditional village of Tarung near Waikabubak (picture taken in 2008)

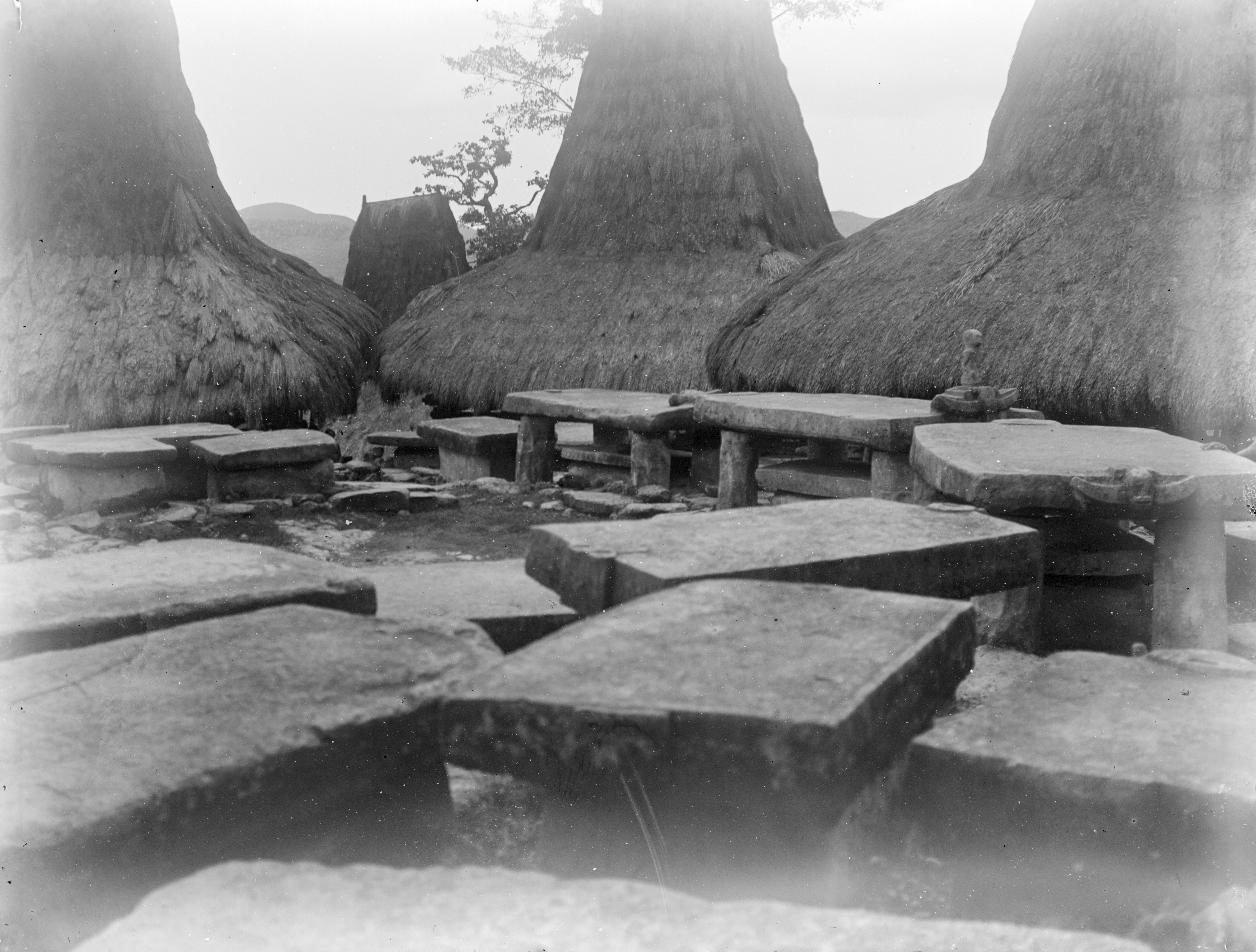
1910 picture of a Marapu holy place in Tarung

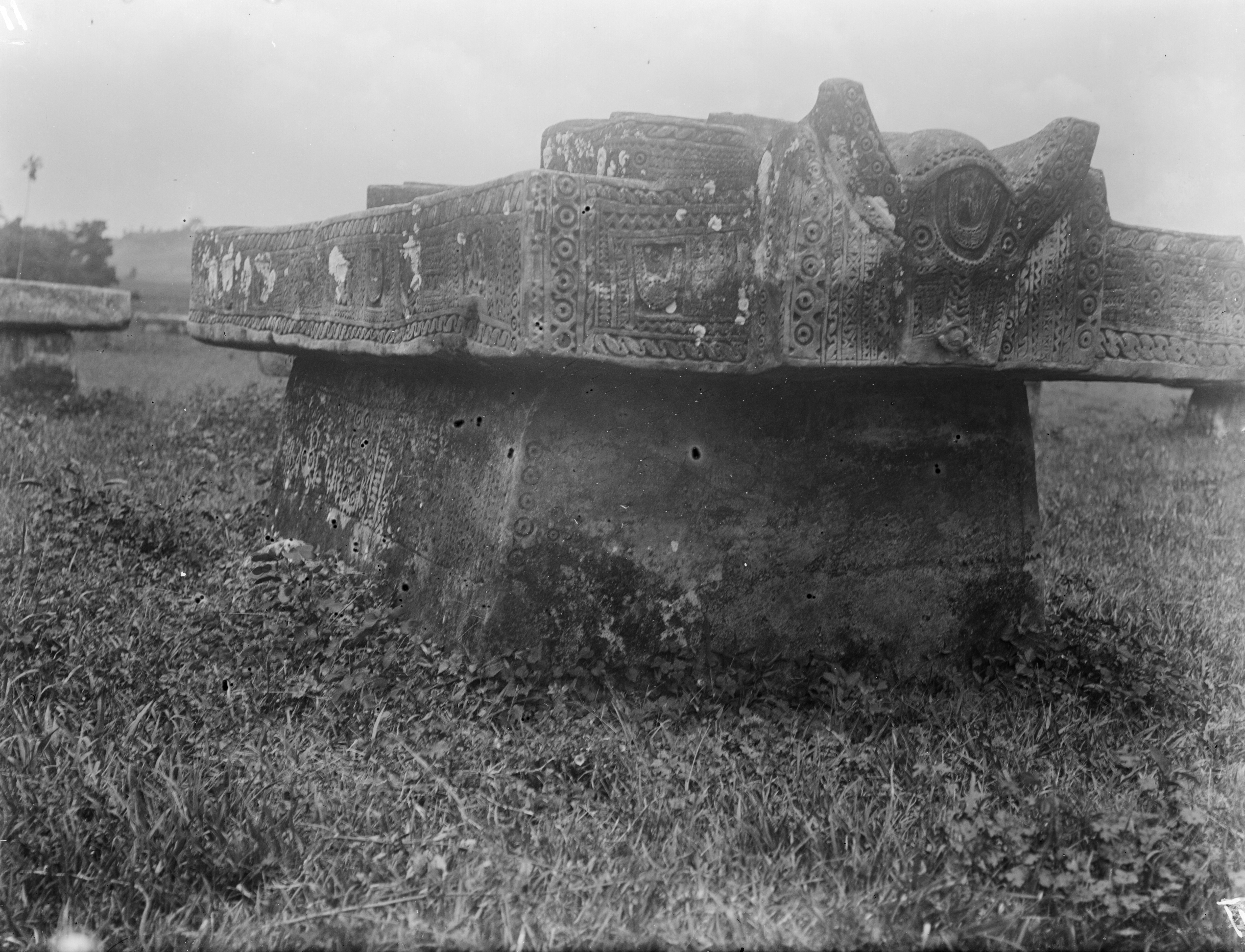
1910 picture of a richly decorated grave in Waikabubak

== Works cited ==
=== Books ===
- Aritonang, Jan; Steenbrink, Karel (2008). A History of Christianity in Indonesia. Brill Publishers. ISBN 9789047441830.
- LaPorte, Luc; Large, Jean-Marc; Nespoulous, Laurent; Scarre, Chris; Steimer-Herbert, Tara, eds. (2022). Megaliths of the World. Archaeopress. ISBN 9781803273211.
- Vel, Jacqueline (2008). Uma Politics: An Ethnography of Democratization in West Sumba, Indonesia, 1986-2006. Brill Publishers. ISBN 9789004253926.

=== Journals ===
- Kuipers, Joel (1984). "Place, Names, and Authority in Weyéwa Ritual Speech". Language in Society. 13 (4). Cambridge University Press: 455–466. doi:10.2307/4167572. JSTOR 4167572.

=== Web ===
- "Number of Population According to Gender in West Sumba Regency, 2020 Population Census Results". Statistics Indonesia. 2020. Archived from the original on 29 June 2025.
