= West Sumba Regency =

Regency in East Nusa Tenggara, Indonesia

West Sumba Regency Kabupaten Sumba Barat
- Regency
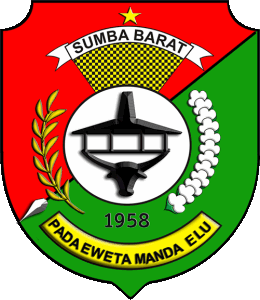
- Coat of arms
- Motto: Pada Eweta Manda Elu (Green meadows, fertile lands)
- Location within East Nusa Tenggara

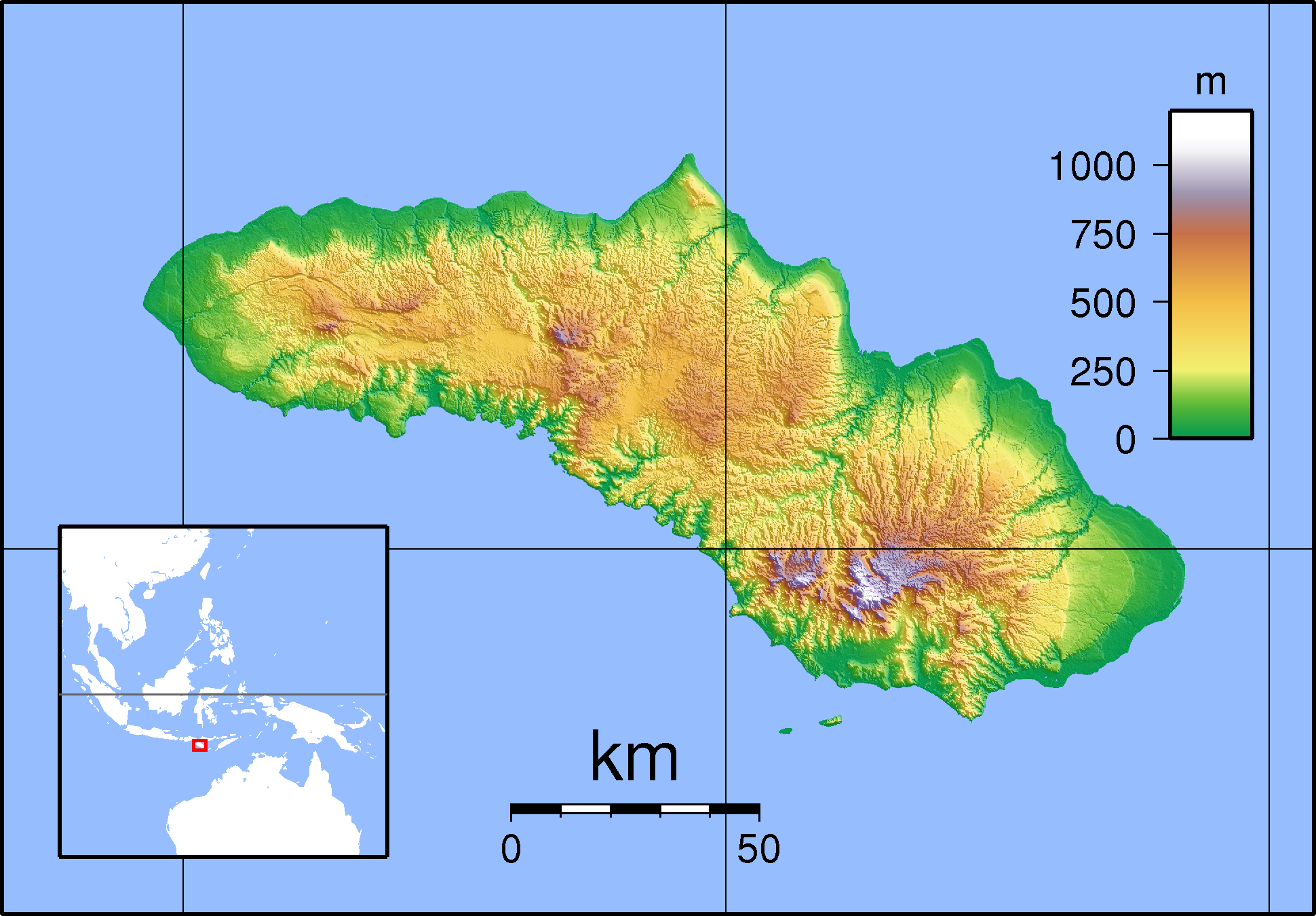
- Location in Sumba, Lesser Sunda Islands and Indonesia West Sumba Regency (Lesser Sunda Islands) West Sumba Regency (Indonesia)
- Coordinates: 9.5667°S 119.4500°E
- Country: Indonesia
- Province: East Nusa Tenggara
- Region: Lesser Sunda Islands
- Capital: Waikabubak

Government
  - Regent: Yohanis Dade
  - Vice Regent: John Lado Bora Kabba

Area
  - Total: 737.42 km^{2} (284.72 sq mi)

Population (mid 2025 estimate)
  - Total: 160,170
  - Density: 217.20/km^{2} (562.55/sq mi)
- Time zone: UTC+8 (ICST)
- Area code: (+62) 387
- Website: sumbabaratkab.go.id

West Sumba Regency (Indonesian: Kabupaten Sumba Barat) is a regency in East Nusa Tenggara Province of Indonesia. Established in 1958, the regency was considerably reduced on 2 January 2007 with the creation of new Regencies on Sumba Island under Law UU No.16 of that year. Its area is now 737.42 km^{2}, and its population was 110,993 at the 2010 census and 145,097 at the 2020 Census; the official estimate as of mid-2025 was 160,170 (comprising 81,800 males and 78,370 females). It has its seat (capital) in (Kota) Waikabubak.

The region is rather dry. One of the main problems for people living in rural areas in the province is frequent shortages of water. Although there are some local supplies of water from wells and springs, water from these sources often becomes scarce during the long dry seasons. In some villages local non-government organisations, some supported with international assistance, support small projects to improve village water supplies.

== Administrative districts ==
The West Sumba Regency (following the re-organisation on 2 January 2007 which created Southwest Sumba Regency and Central Sumba Regency out of parts of West Sumba Regency) is now composed of six districts (kecamatan), whose areas (in km^{2}) and populations at the 2010 Census and 2020 Census, are listed below, together with the official estimates as of mid-2025. The table also includes the locations of the district headquarters, the number of administrative villages in each district (totaling 63 rural desa and 11 urban kelurahan), and its postal code.

Kode Wilayah	Name of District (kecamatan)	Area in km^{2}	Pop'n Census 2010	Pop'n Census 2020	Pop'n Estimate mid 2025	Admin centre	No. of villages	Post code
53.12.12	Lamboya	125.65	15,856	22,059	25,178	Kabukarudi	11	87271
53.12.11	Wanokata	133.68	14,163	18,811	20,888	Pogo Katoda	14	87272
53.12.18	Laboya Barat (West Laboya)	161.23	7,327	8,815	9,230	Hodi	4	87270
53.12.10	Loli	132.36	27,103	38,932	45,286	Dokakaka	14 ^{(a)}	87284
53.12.15	Kota Waikabubak (Waikabubak town)	44.71	28,874	33,064	33,621	Waikabubak	13 ^{(b)}	87211: 87217
53.12.04	Tana Righu	139.79	17,670	23,416	25,967	Malata	18	87257
	Totals	737.42	110,993	145,097	160,170	Waikabubak	74	

Notes: (a) comprising 5 kelurahan (Dira Tana, Loda Pare, Sobawawi, Wee Dabo and Wee Karou) and 9 desa.
(b) comprising 6 kelurahan (Kampung Baru, Kampung Sawah, Komerda, Maliti, Pada Eweta and Wailiang) and 7 desa.

== Villages ==
Villages in the area include:

- Tarung
- Waitabar
- Bodo Ede
- Bodomaroto
- Wainyapu
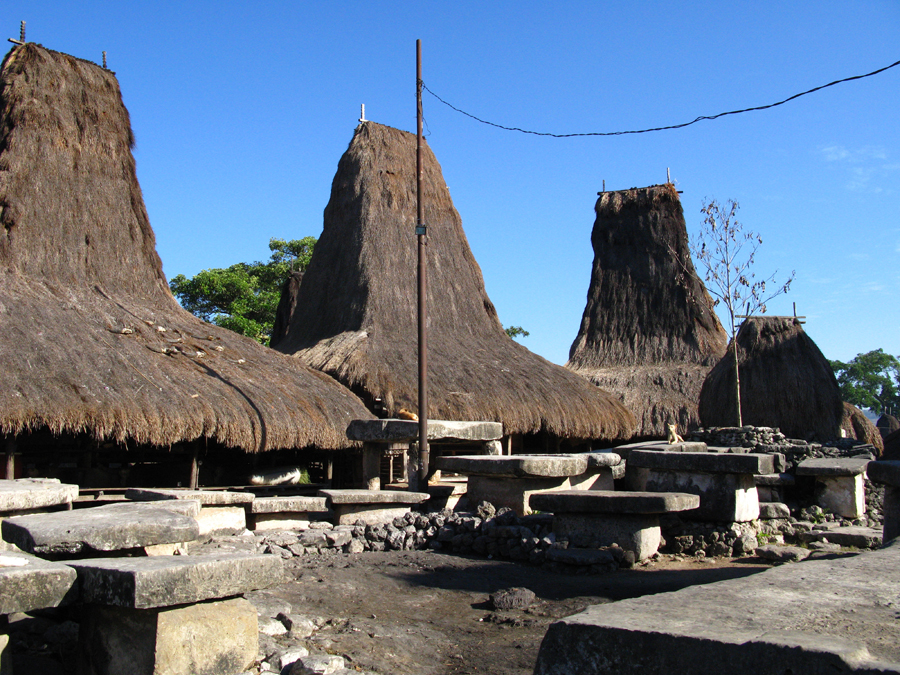
Traditional houses in Tarung-Waitabar village

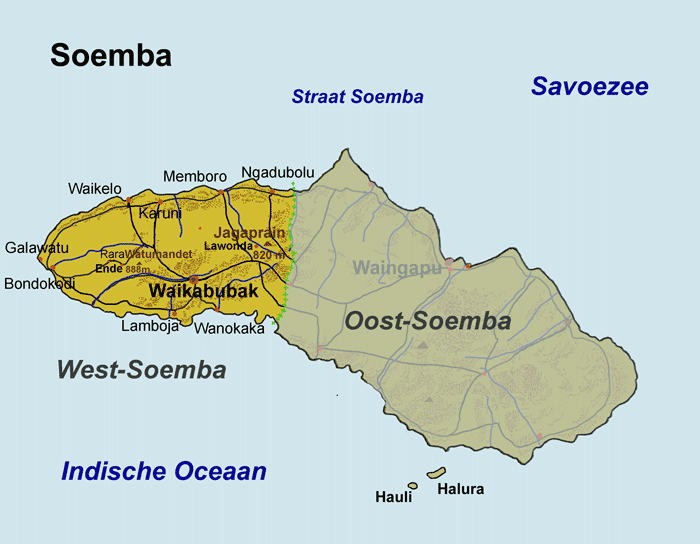
Map of Sumba Island, showing West Sumba Regency prior to the creation in 2007 of the new Southwest Sumba Regency and Central Sumba Regency from parts of West Sumba Regency.

== Tourism ==
In 2016 and 2017 Travel + Leisure magazine gave the title of World's Best Hotel (with the highest 98.35 score based on readers' choice) to Nihiwatu Resort (now known as Nihi Sumba). The hotel is one of the leading sectors for ecotourism.

== Climate ==
Waikabubak has a tropical monsoon climate (Am) with moderate to little rainfall from June to September and heavy to very heavy rainfall from October to May.

Climate data for Waikabubak
Month	Jan	Feb	Mar	Apr	May	Jun	Jul	Aug	Sep	Oct	Nov	Dec	Year
Mean daily maximum °C (°F)	28.9 (84.0)	28.4 (83.1)	28.9 (84.0)	29.3 (84.7)	28.9 (84.0)	28.2 (82.8)	28.1 (82.6)	28.6 (83.5)	29.4 (84.9)	30.0 (86.0)	29.6 (85.3)	29.2 (84.6)	29.0 (84.1)
Daily mean °C (°F)	23.7 (74.7)	23.5 (74.3)	23.8 (74.8)	23.7 (74.7)	23.1 (73.6)	22.2 (72.0)	21.7 (71.1)	21.9 (71.4)	22.9 (73.2)	23.9 (75.0)	24.4 (75.9)	24.1 (75.4)	23.2 (73.8)
Mean daily minimum °C (°F)	18.6 (65.5)	18.6 (65.5)	18.7 (65.7)	18.2 (64.8)	17.4 (63.3)	16.3 (61.3)	15.3 (59.5)	15.3 (59.5)	16.4 (61.5)	17.9 (64.2)	19.2 (66.6)	19.0 (66.2)	17.6 (63.6)
Average rainfall mm (inches)	415 (16.3)	365 (14.4)	375 (14.8)	258 (10.2)	181 (7.1)	63 (2.5)	48 (1.9)	30 (1.2)	76 (3.0)	151 (5.9)	292 (11.5)	405 (15.9)	2,659 (104.7)
Source: Climate-Data.org
