= Jakarta Theological Seminary =

Oldest Christian theological college and university in Indonesia

Coordinates: 6.2010°S 106.8451°E

Jakarta School of Theological Philosophy
- Sekolah Tinggi Filsafat Theologi Jakarta
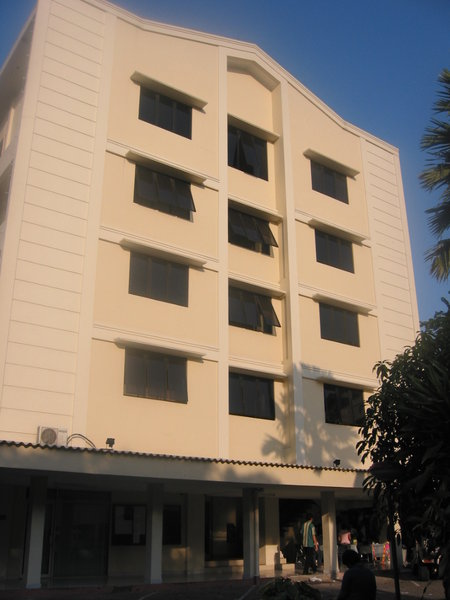
- Other names: STFT Jakarta
- Former names: Hoogere Theologische School; Sekolah Tinggi Teologi Jakarta
- Type: Higher school
- Established: 1934; 92 years ago
- Location: Jl. Proklamasi No. 27, 10320, Central Jakarta, Jakarta, Indonesia
- Website: stftjakarta.ac.id

Jakarta School of Theological Philosophy or Jakarta Theological Seminary (Indonesian: Sekolah Tinggi Filsafat Theologi Jakarta), abbreviated as STFT Jakarta, is the oldest Christian theological college and university in Indonesia. It was founded in 1934 as Hoogere Theologische School (HTS) in Bogor (Buitenzorg).

This school was founded to answer the vision put forward by H. Kraemer in the late 1920s, as an effort to prepare pastors and priests in Indonesia. According to Kraemer, there must be a new orientation in theological education. Indonesians should not be educated to only become assistants or helpers to Dutch pastors or missionaries.

== Background ==
In 1936 this school was moved to Jakarta, then in 1954 its name changed to Jakarta Theological College. STT Jakarta was born as a higher education institution that seeks to implement the Tri Dharma of Higher Education.

Prof. Dr. Mulller Kruger, rector of STT Jakarta (the first rector was Dr. J.R. Slottemaker de Bruine), in that year also introduced what was called theologia in loco, a theology which he hoped would be familiar to Indonesia and could bear fruit for the Churches in Indonesia. At that time, the education period lasted six years and was expected to produce Indonesian pastors in the shortest possible time and with the best possible results.

Between 1942-1945, during the Japanese occupation, HTS lecturers were taken prisoner and lectures stopped. As a result, schools were forced to close. When it reopened in 1946, the need was felt to educate as many Indonesian workers as possible in a short time, for the future service of the churches. Therefore, educational programs are directed at producing professionals in the field of theology who have an ecumenical outlook.

When the Republic of Indonesia was proclaimed on August 17, 1945, HTS was developed into a theological education institution that was fully equivalent to university education. On 27 September 1954 the name of HTS was changed to Jakarta Theological College, and this date was taken to commemorate the founding of STT Jakarta. Since 27 September 1954, for the first time a high school diploma was required as a condition for entering STT Jakarta. In addition, the ecumenical nature of this school is becoming increasingly clear according to churches in Indonesia, which is marked by the rotating position of rector by Indonesian lecturers.

In 1958, STT Jakarta opened its own advanced study program, and since 1966 it has also developed the South East Asia Graduate School of Theology (SEAGST) advanced study program, within the framework of a consortium of Theological Schools in Southeast Asia which has succeeded in diverting the flow of advanced studies to the Asian region yourself.

== Facilities ==
- Church Citizen Learning Center (PPWG)

Since 2003, STT Jakarta has developed the Community Learning Center Church (PPWG) program, which is intended to carry out educational activities and training for churches and church members, especially those in the DKI Jakarta area and its surroundings. However, currently PPWG's work can also be felt by various parties in remote areas of the archipelago.

- Library

Library STFT Jakarta has a book collection of 62,429 copies, with 37,362 book titles (as of November 2009). Several cassettes audio, video cassettes, DVDs and CDs. The Jakarta STFT Library is one of the most complete and largest theological libraries in Indonesia.

- Chapel
- Laboratory Sermon
- Wisma STFT (Guest House)
- Student Activity Center (PKM)
- Halls on the 1st and 5th floors
- Church Liturgy and Music Workshop (BLMG)
- Christian Education Workshop (PK Workshop)

The Christian Education Workshop (PK) is a place that has been specially designed so that it becomes a familiar and comfortable place for students and for church members in general. The PK Workshop is a place to get ideas and a source of inspiration, be creative in developing ideas, designing and creating various ecclesiastical programs.

- Canteen
- Sports Facilities (badminton court, table tennis)
- Multimedia room
- Indonesian Church History Documentation Center (PDSGI)

Since June 2004, PDSGI has been held with the aim of informing, collecting and managing Indonesian church history documents, both in Indonesia and abroad and using them to support formal studies at STT Jakarta and provide information for church, community, or anyone who needs information about it. Currently the PDSGI collection consists of two large parts, namely: published literature and loose and unpublished documents. All PDSGI collections have reference status, so they can only be read on site.

== Alumni ==
The following are some names of STFT Jakarta alumni who stand out for their achievements and leadership in the church and society, namely:

Name	Description
A.A. Yewangoe	theologian, General Chair of PGI 2004-2014
Andar Lumbantobing	Bishop Emiritus of Indonesian Protestant Christian Church in Pematangsiantar
Eka Darmaputera	theologian, ethicist
Fridolin Ukur	theologian, poet
Ihromi	theologian, Hebrew language expert
Jan Sihar Aritonang	expert on church history, Chairman I of PGI
J. L.Ch. Abineno	theologian, writer
Liem Khiem Yang	theologian, Greek expert, translator of the Bible
Marianne Katoppo	feminist theologian first Indonesia, writer
P.D. Latuihamallo	pastor, member of the DPR-RI
SAE Nababan	President of the World Council of Churches, chairman of the World Lutheran Federation
W.J. Rumambi	pastor, Minister of Information during the Soekarno government

== Supporting Churches ==
- Batak Protestant Christian Church (HKBP)
- Indonesian Christian Church (GKI)
- Javanese Christian Churches (GKJ)
- Protestant Churches in Western Indonesia (GPIB)
- Pasundan Christian Church (GKP)
- Evangelical Borneo Church (GKE)
- Protestant Church in Indonesia (GPI)
- Evangelical Christian Church in Minahasa (GMIM)
- Protestant Church of Maluku (GPM)
- Evangelical Christian Church in Bolaang Mongondow (GMIBM)
- Evangelical Church in Timor (GMIT)
- Toraja Church (GT)
- Evangelical Church in Java (GITJ)
- Sumba Christian Church (GKS)
- Fellowship of Churches in Indonesia, representing its other member churches.
