= List of rivers of East Nusa Tenggara =

List of rivers flowing in the province of East Nusa Tenggara (Indonesian: Nusa Tenggara Timur), Indonesia. The province comprises the eastern part of the Lesser Sunda Islands. The main islands in the province are, from west to east: Flores, Sumba, Timor, Alor Archipelago, Barat Daya Islands, and Tanimbar Islands.

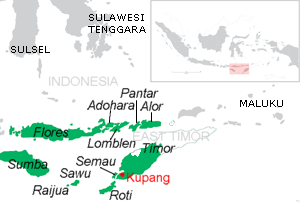
East Nusa Tenggara in Indonesia

== In alphabetical order ==
- Benanain River
- Kadassa River
- Kadumbul River
- Kambaniru River
- Melolo River
- Mina River
- Noel Besi River
- Polapare River
- Pono River
- Sissa River
- Wanokaka River
- Wera River

== By Island ==
This list is arranged by island in alphabetical order. The respective tributaries indented under each larger stream's name.

=== Flores ===
- Sissa River
- Wera River

=== Sumba ===
- Kadassa River
- Kadumbul River
- Kambaniru River
- Melolo River
- Polapare River
- Wanokaka River

=== West Timor ===
- Benanain River
- Mina River
- Noel Besi River
- Pono River

== See also ==
- List of drainage basins of Indonesia
- List of rivers of Indonesia
- List of rivers of Lesser Sunda Islands
