= List of rivers of the Lesser Sunda Islands =

List of rivers flowing in the Lesser Sunda Islands (Indonesian: Kepulauan Nusa Tenggara), Indonesia. The main Lesser Sunda Islands are, from west to east: Bali, Lombok, Sumbawa, Flores, Sumba, Timor, Alor archipelago, Barat Daya Islands, and Tanimbar Islands.

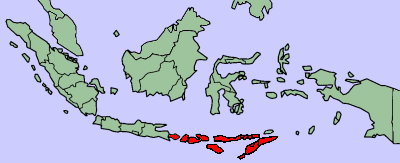
Lesser Sunda Islands in Indonesia

== By Island ==
This list is arranged by island in alphabetical order. The respective tributaries indented under each larger stream's name.

=== Bali ===
- Ayung River
- Sungi River
- Telaga Waja River

=== Flores ===
- Sissa River
- Wera River

=== Sumba ===
- Kadassa River
- Kadumbul River
- Kambaniru River
- Melolo River
- Polapare River
- Wanokaka River

=== Sumbawa ===
- Brang Biji River
- Moyo River

=== West Timor ===
- Benanain River
- Mina River
- Noel Besi River
- Pono River

== By Province ==
=== Bali ===
- Ayung River
- Sungi River
- Telaga Waja River

=== East Nusa Tenggara ===
- Benanain River
- Kadassa River
- Kadumbul River
- Kambaniru River
- Melolo River
- Mina River
- Noel Besi River
- Polapare River
- Pono River
- Sissa River
- Wanokaka River
- Wera River

== See also ==
- List of drainage basins of Indonesia
- List of rivers of Indonesia
