= List of rivers of Sumba =

List of rivers flowing in the island of Sumba, Indonesia.

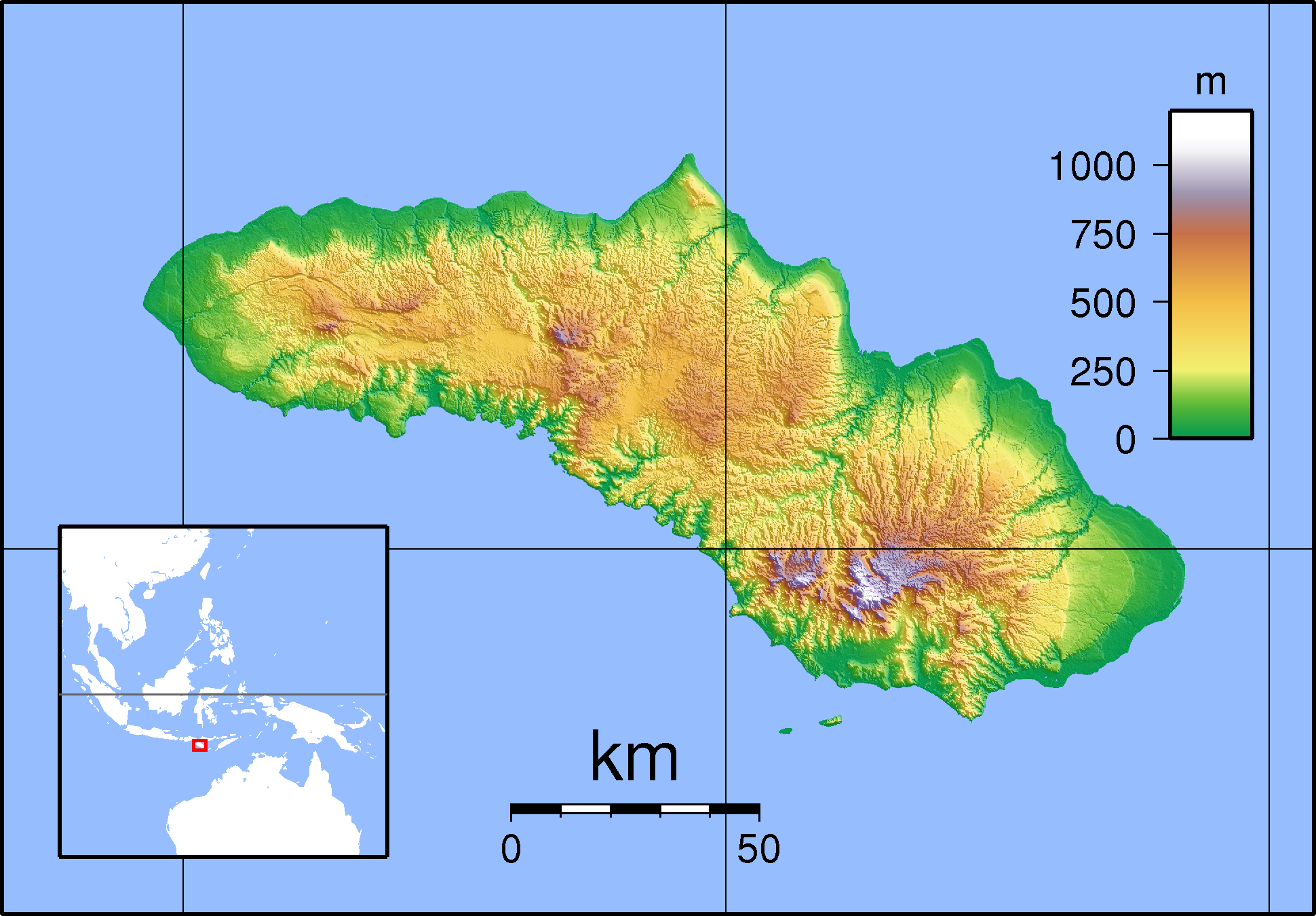
Rivers of Sumba

== In alphabetical order ==
- Kadassa River
- Kadumbul River
- Kambaniru River
- Melolo River
- Polapare River
- Wanokaka River

== See also ==
- Drainage basins of Sumba
- List of drainage basins of Indonesia
- List of rivers of Indonesia
- List of rivers of Lesser Sunda Islands
