= List of bodies of water in Bali =

This is a list of significant lakes and rivers on the island of Bali, Indonesia.

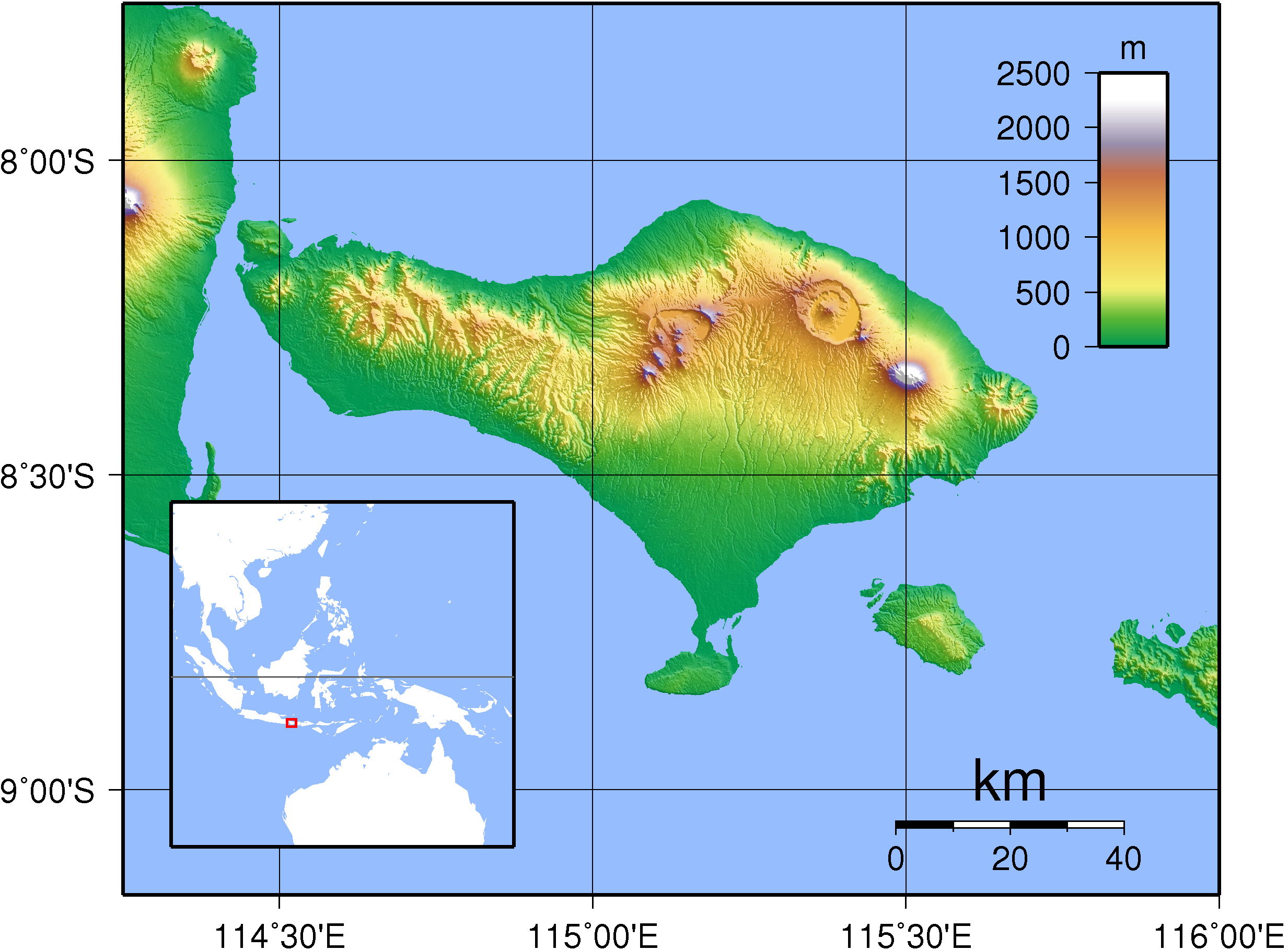
Bali island.

== A ==
- Ayung River is a river that rises near Penulisan, on the rim of the Batur crater, and flows almost due south, passing west of Ubud in a deep gorge (overlooked by several five-star resorts) and emptying into the Badung Strait just north of Sanur. The Ayung is Bali's longest river, measuring approximately 75 kilometers from source to mouth. It is popular with white-water rafters, but its rapids do not exceed Level III. The Ayung has a relatively small drainage area, as most of its tributaries run in parallel valleys.

== B ==
- Tukad Balian is a river that rises on the western slopes of Gunung Batukaru and flows in a southward curve to meet the Bali Strait. It has a length of approximately 33 km.
- Danau Batur is a crater lake that fills the south-eastern side of the Batur caldera. It is Bali's largest lake and has an area of approximately 18 square kilometers. Just as Gunung Agung is revered by Pura Besakih as Bali's largest mountain, Batur is revered by its own temple, Pura Ulun Danu Batur, as Bali's largest lake. Pura Batur is considered Bali's second-most important temple, after Besakih.
- Danau Bratan is a crater lake that lies in the southeastern part of the Bedugul caldera. It is almost square in shape and has an approximate area of 4 square kilometers. Danau Bratan is a holy lake in Balinese mythology, and is home to Pura Ulun Danu Bratan, one of Bali's most important temples.
- Danau Buyan is Bali's second-largest lake (4.5 square km), although it is quite shallow. It is situated below the northern rim of the Bedugul caldera. Unlike Batur and Bratan, Danau Buyan is not especially important in the Balinese religion.

== H ==
- Tukad Ho, also known, especially in its upper reaches, as Yeh Ho, is a river flowing from the north slopes of Gunung Sengayang in a 180-degree curve, creating the valley between Gunung Adeng and Sengayang, before crossing the western section of Bali's southern plain and emptying into the Bali Strait. Tukad Ho drains large parts of Tabanan regency and is approximately 46 km in length.

== M ==
- Tukad Matan is a river that flows out of Gunung Batukaru's southern foothills, south across Tabanan regency, and into the Bali Strait. It is approximately 22 km long.
- Tukad Mendaum has its source on the northwestern rim of the Bedugul crater. From there it flows due west, past the village of Munduk (where it passes a fair-sized waterfall), curving north through the town of Banjar towards the Bali Sea. The Mendaum runs parallel to the Tukad Saba for much of its course, and is approximately 28 km long.

== O ==
- Tukad Otan is a river that originates on the south slope of Gunung Batukaru and flows almost due south through Tabanan regency past the town of Bajera to the Bali Strait. The Otan is approximately 30 km in length.

== P ==
- Palasari Reservoir is a small, man-made lake along the Tukad Palareja. Its size fluctuates with the dry and wet seasons, but is usually around 0.3 square km in size.

== S ==
- Tukad Saba is a significant river that originates on the northern slopes of Gunung Batukaru and flows at first in a westerly direction, then in a curve northward to empty into the Bali Sea near Seririt. In terms of drainage, the Saba is one of Bali's largest rivers and is the largest that empties along the north coast. The Saba has an approximate length of 36 km. As the Saba flows through the relatively arid area of Buleleng, it often dries to a trickle, especially during dry season. The Saba creates a large valley that allows easy access over Bali's mountain chain along one of the north–south roads.

== T ==
- Danau Tamblingan is a small crater lake at the northwestern edge of Bedugul caldera. It is far smaller than the lakes it shares the caldera with (Buyan and Bratan), but is a popular one among hikers. There are at least 31 temples around the 115 hectares of Tamblingan lake, but recently the lake's water level frequently rise and flooded some houses due to worse of ecosystem.

== See also ==
- Geography of Indonesia
- List of lakes in Indonesia
- List of rivers of Bali
