= Mina River =

Mina River may refer to:

- Mina River (Indonesia)
- Mina River (Algeria)
