= List of rivers of Bali =

List of rivers flowing in the island of Bali, Indonesia.

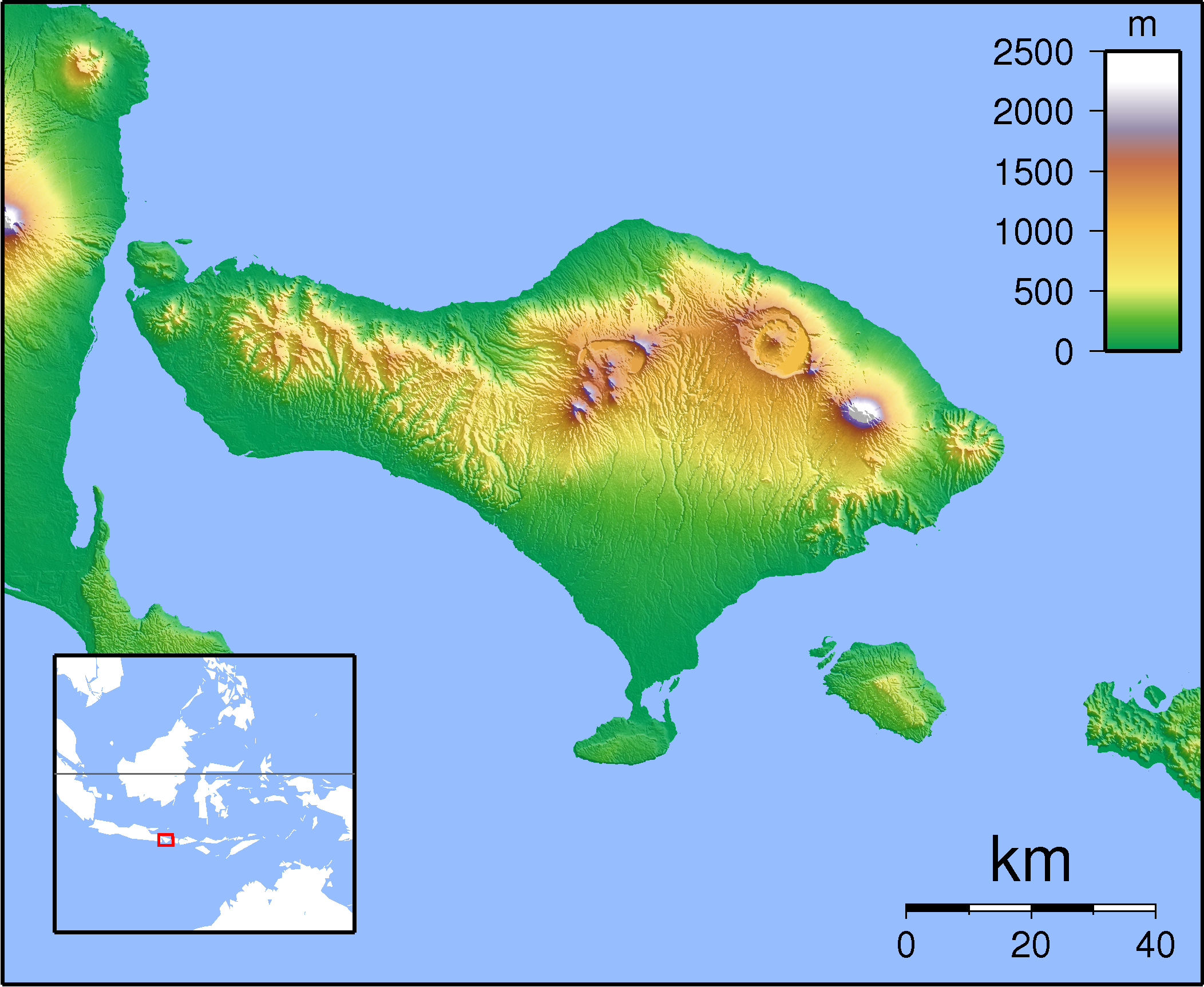
Topography of Bali

== In alphabetical order ==
- Ayung River
- Sungi River
- Telaga Waja River

== See also ==
- Drainage basins of Bali
- List of drainage basins of Indonesia
- List of bodies of water in Bali
- List of rivers of Indonesia
- List of rivers of Lesser Sunda Islands
