= List of rivers of Flores =

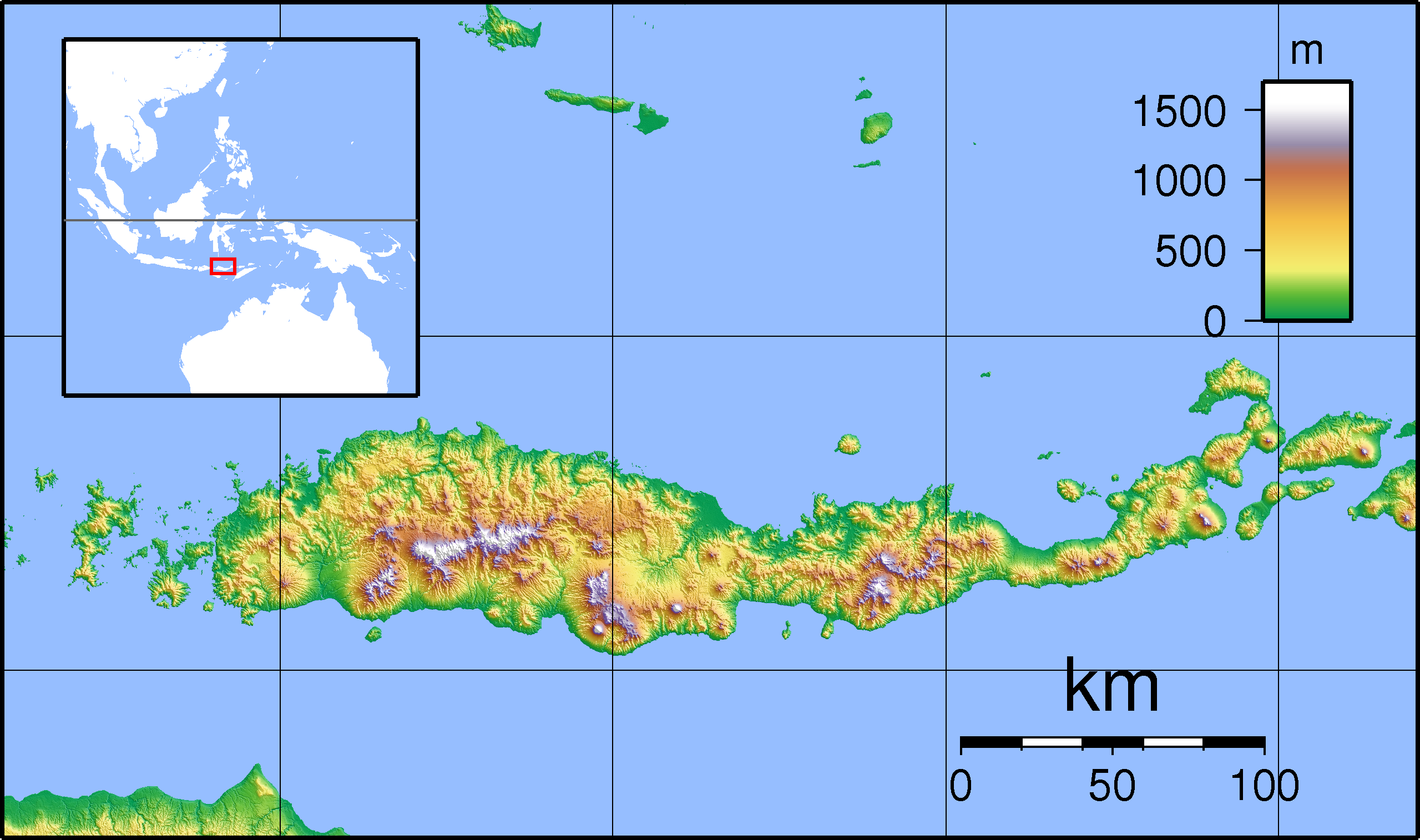
Major rivers in Flores

The following rivers flow on the island of Flores, East Nusa Tenggara province, Indonesia.

== In alphabetical order ==
- Sissa River
- Wera River

== See also ==
- List of drainage basins of Indonesia
- List of rivers of Indonesia
- List of rivers of Lesser Sunda Islands
