= List of rivers of West Timor =

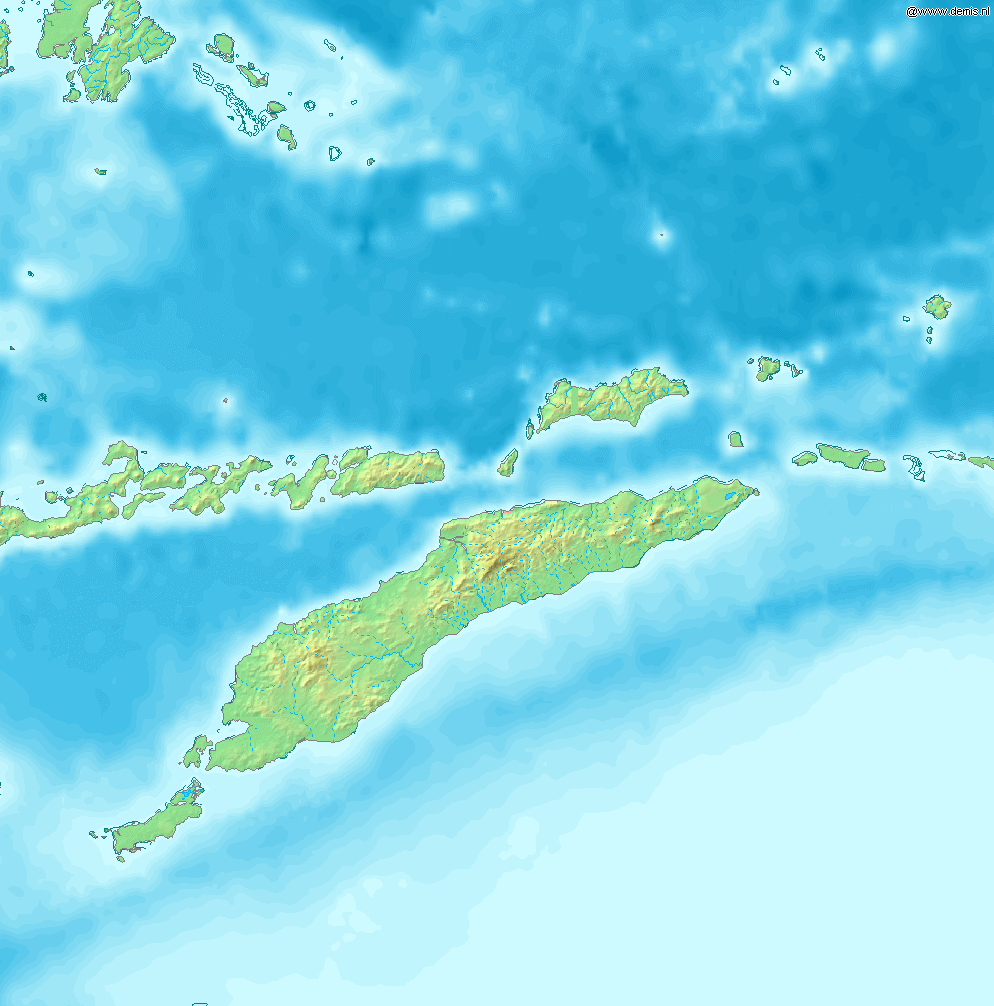
Main rivers of West Timor

List of rivers flowing in the western part of Timor island, which is in the territory of Indonesia. For the eastern part of Timor island, see East Timor.

== In alphabetical order ==
- Benanain River
- Mina River
- Noel Besi River
- Pono River

== See also ==
- Drainage basins of Timor
- List of drainage basins of Indonesia
- List of rivers of Indonesia
- List of rivers of Lesser Sunda Islands
