= Manupeu Tanah Daru National Park =

National park in Indonesia

- Taman Nasional Manupeu Tanah Daru
- IUCN category II (national park)
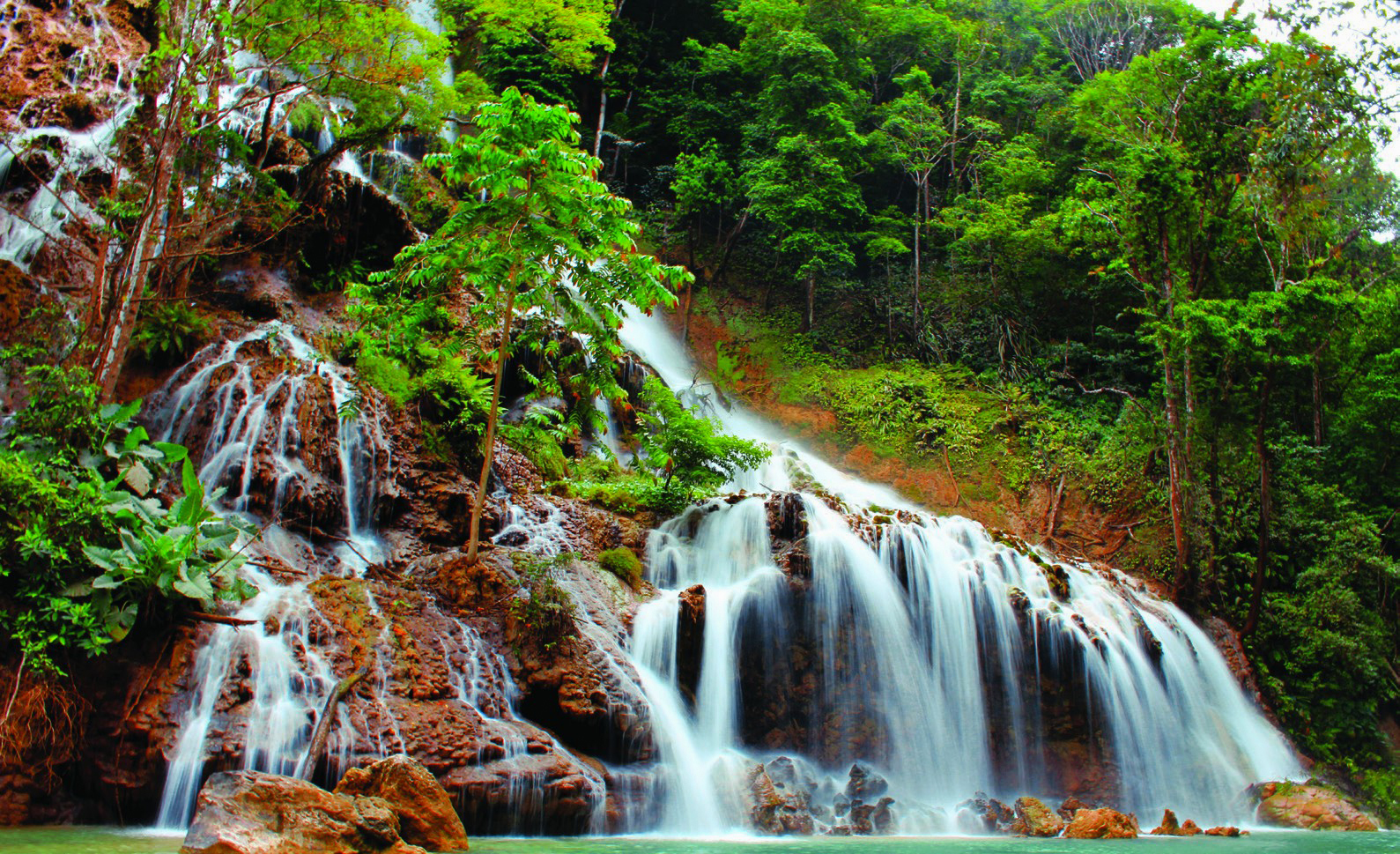
- Lapopu waterfall in Manupeu Tanah Daru National Park

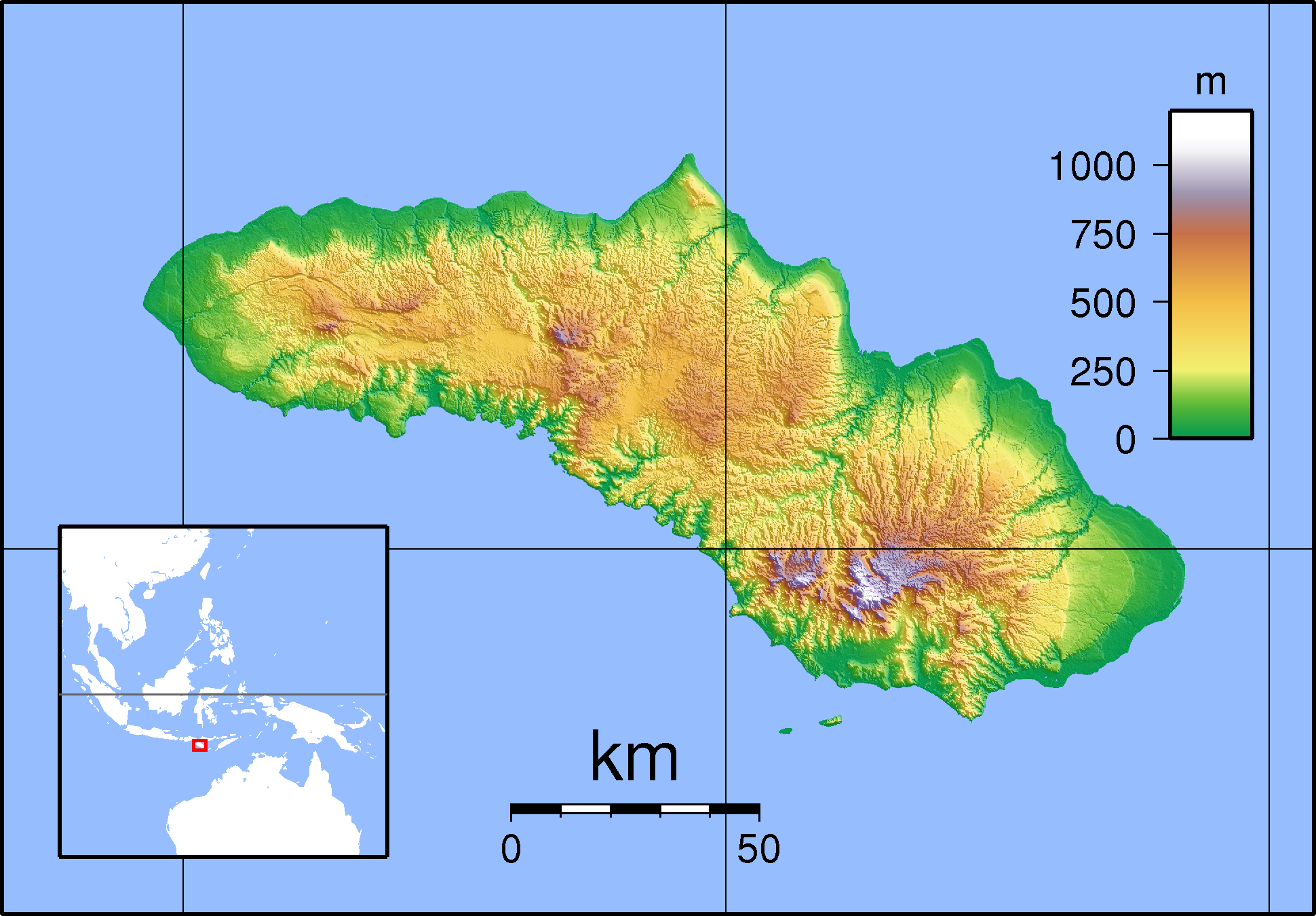
- Location within Sumba
- Location: Sumba, Indonesia
- Coordinates: 9°44′0″S 119°41′0″E
- Area: 87,984.09 ha (217,413.4 acres)
- Established: 1998
- Governing body: Ministry of Forestry

Manupeu Tanah Daru National Park is located on the island of Sumba in Indonesia. This national park consists lowland forests on steep slopes that rise up to ca. 600m.

== Flora and fauna ==
There are about 118 plant species protected in this national park including Toona sureni, Sterculia foetida, Schleichera oleosa, Alstonia scholaris (ditabark), tamarind, candlenut, Syzygium species, Casuarina species, and Lantana camara (Spanish flag).

There are also 87 species of birds protected in this region, with 7 bird taxa endemic to the island of Sumba. These are Sumba yellow-crested cockatoo, Sumba green pigeon, Sumba flycatcher, Sumba cicadabird, apricot-breasted sunbird and Sumba hornbill.

57 species of butterflies are also protected here, 7 of them are endemic to this island. These are Papilio neumoegenii, Ideopsis oberthurii, Delias fasciata, Junonia adulatrix, Athyma karita, Sumalia chilo, and Elimnia amoena.

== See also ==
- Geography of Indonesia
- Wanokaka River
