= Telaga Waja River =

River in Bali, Indonesia

Coordinates: 8.5078°S 115.4153°E

Telaga Waja River Sungai Telaga Waja, Tukad Telagawaja, Tukad Telagawadja

Location
- Country: Indonesia
- Province: Bali

Location in Bali

The Telaga Waja is a river which is situated in eastern Bali, Indonesia. It rises on the slope of Mount Abang and passes through towns and wilderness slopes along the region of Rendang Village, reaching the sea in Klungkung Regency.

== Hydrology ==
The Telaga Waja River is mainly located in the District of Rendang, Karangasem Regency, the eastern part of Bali, the second in length after the Ayung River. The water comes from several springs in the mountains near Mount Agung, the highest mountain in Bali, and is considered holy by Hindu native people, such as Lipang, Arca, and Telaga Waja springs. Also, numerous smaller fountains flow into Telaga Waja, like the Yeh Sah River that sprung out of natural springs. The combination of tributaries and springs contributes to a high water discharge, which is used by the local government for drinking water supply. Tourist attractions along the river are very popular, in particular, rafting.

== Geography ==
The river flows in the eastern to the southeastern of Bali with a predominantly tropical rainforest climate (designated as Af in the Köppen-Geiger climate classification). The annual average temperature in the area is 24 °C. The warmest month is October when the average temperature is around 27 °C, and the coldest is January, at 22 °C. The average annual rainfall is 2123 mm. The wettest month is January, with an average of 569 mm of rainfall, and the driest is September, with 23 mm of rainfall.

Sungai Telaga Waja

Climate chart (precipitation, max. and min. temperature)
J	F	M	A	M	J	J	A	S	O	N	D
569 24 21	257 28 23	255 27 22	117 26 23	127 26 22	98 25 20	86 25 21	24 27 19	23 30 20	30 32 22	173 29 21	365 26 22
- █ Average max. and min. temperatures in °C
- █ Precipitation totals in mm
Imperial conversion
J	F	M	A	M	J	J	A	S	O	N	D
22 75 70	10 82 73	10 81 72	4.6 79 73	5 79 72	3.9 77 68	3.4 77 70	0.9 81 66	0.9 86 68	1.2 90 72	6.8 84 70	14 79 72
- █ Average max. and min. temperatures in °F
- █ Precipitation totals in inches

== See also ==
- List of drainage basins of Indonesia
- List of rivers of Bali
- List of rivers of Indonesia
