= Pono River =

River in Indonesia

Pono River Sungai Noel Ponu, Sungai Pono, Pono Rivier, Noil Ponoe, Noil Ponu, Noë Ponoe
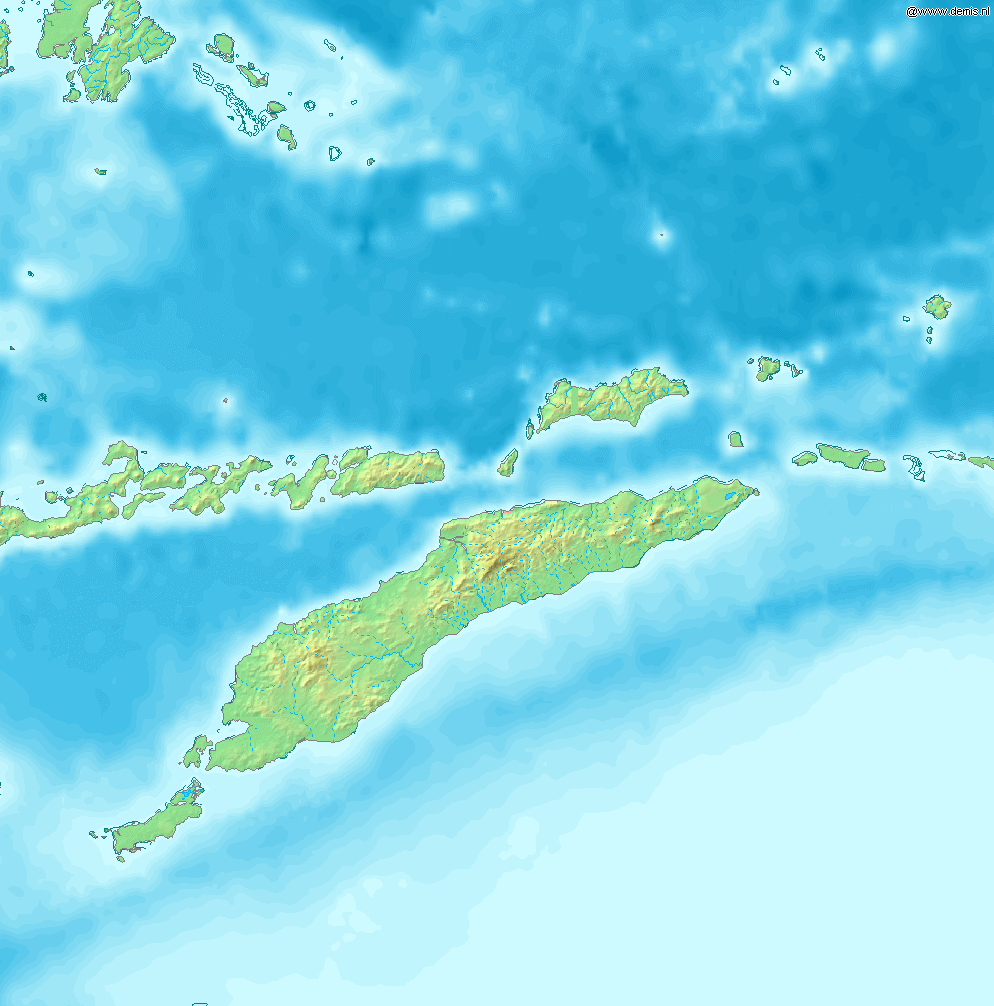
- Location of river mouth Pono River (Lesser Sunda Islands) Pono River (Indonesia)

Location
- Country: Indonesia

Physical characteristics
- Source
  - location: Timor
- Mouth: Sawu Sea
  - location: Atambua
  - coordinates: 9.12111°S 124.66972°E

The Pono River (Indonesian: Sungai Noel Ponu or Sungai Pono) is a river on the Indonesian part of the island of Timor, which is in the territory of the East Nusa Tenggara province, about 2000 km east of the Indonesian capital, Jakarta.

== History ==
On November 4, 2010, the river overflowed, killing some 16 people, destroying 134 homes, and displacing 825 people from their homes.

== Geography ==
Noel Ponu

Climate chart (precipitation, max. and min. temperature)
J	F	M	A	M	J	J	A	S	O	N	D
297 26 23	275 24 21	233 25 21	107 26 22	128 28 21	126 29 21	34 29 21	9 32 21	6 35 22	24 34 23	95 32 23	241 28 23
- █ Average max. and min. temperatures in °C
- █ Precipitation totals in mm
Imperial conversion
J	F	M	A	M	J	J	A	S	O	N	D
12 79 73	11 75 70	9.2 77 70	4.2 79 72	5 82 70	5 84 70	1.3 84 70	0.4 90 70	0.2 95 72	0.9 93 73	3.7 90 73	9.5 82 73
- █ Average max. and min. temperatures in °F
- █ Precipitation totals in inches

The river flows in the southwest of Timor with predominantly tropical savanna climate (designated as Aw in the Köppen–Geiger climate classification system). The annual average temperature in the area is 25 °C. The warmest month is October, when the average temperature is around 28 °C, and the coldest is February, at 22 °C. The average annual rainfall is 1575 mm. The wettest month is January, with an average of 297 mm, and the driest is September, with 6 mm rainfall.

== See also ==
- List of rivers of Indonesia
- List of rivers of Lesser Sunda Islands
- List of rivers of West Timor
