= List of mountains in Bali =

This is a list of mountains on the island of Bali, Indonesia.

Name	Height	Location	Description
Gunung Abang	2151 m	Mount Batur	Gunung Abang is the highest point on the Batur caldera's rim and, at 2,151 m, the third-highest in all of Bali. It lies to the east of Danau Batur. Abang used to be part of the original Mount Batur, but when this 4,000-meter volcano had an enormous eruption in prehistoric times, it left nothing but a large caldera and a small cone, the present-day Batur, within. Abang is not a popular peak among mountain climbers, although it is not a strenuous climb.
Gunung Adeng	1826 m	Bedugul volcanic area	Gunung Adeng is a dormant stratovolcano in the Bedugul volcanic area. It has a height of 1,826 meters.
Gunung Agung	3148 m	Gunung Agung	At 3,148 meters in height, Gunung Agung is the highest mountain on Bali by nearly a kilometer. It lies in the central-eastern part of the island. Geologically, Agung is an active stratovolcano, and has had major eruptions in the past, most significantly in 1963. According to the Balinese Hindu religion, Agung is the most sacred of mountains and is home to Bali's largest temple, Pura Besakih. Agung is popular with mountain climbers.
Gunung Batukaru	2276 m	Bedugul volcanic area	Gunung Batukaru, sometimes spelled Batukau, is Bali's second-highest mountain at 2,276 m. It is the highest peak in the Bedugul volcanic area, but is dormant. Batukaru is sacred for the Balinese, and has a temple, Pura Luhur Batukaru, devoted to it. Batukaru is relatively unpopular with climbers as it is covered in a dense forest which restricts views. Batukaru has a large crater, the largest on Bali, but this crater is open at the southern end, allowing the river Mawa to escape. It is this that gives it the name "Batukaru", which means "coconut shell" in Balinese
Gunung Batur	1717 m	Mount Batur	Gunung Batur is a small stratovolcano in north-central Bali. It has several craters, and is 1,717 m in height. Batur lies within a large caldera, the remains of a cataclysmic prehistoric eruption of a volcano that was once over 4,000 m in height. Batur remains active to this day and has erupted over 20 times in the last two centuries. Major eruptions have occurred in 1917, 1926 and 1963 (the same year as Agung's major eruption), making Batur Bali's most active volcano. Batur is a popular trekking mountain among tourists. The term "Batur" often refers to the entire caldera, including Gunung Abang, Bali's third-highest peak, which is situated along the rim.
Gunung Catur	2096 m	Bedugul volcanic area	Gunung Catur, sometimes spelled Catu, is the highest point along the rim of the Bedugul caldera, and the fourth-highest in Bali (2,096 m). It lies to the east of Danau Bratan and is quite popular among climbers, despite the heavy forest that covers it.
Gunung Lesong	1865 m	Bedugul volcanic area	Gunung Lesong is a dormant stratovolcano in the Bedugul volcanic region, just south of Lake Tamblingan. It has a large crater at its peak, just over half the size of that of Agung. Lesong's highest peak is 1,865 meters above sea level. Although Lesong has been climbed, trekkers usually avoid the long trek through dense jungle to reach its peak.
Gunung Lempuyang	1058 m	Gunung Lempuyang	Gunung Lempuyang, also called Belibis Hill, is situated at the most easterly tip of Bali, just east of Mount Agung. The peak, at 1,058m, is on the southern edge of the caldera. The Lempuyang Temple (or Pura Luhur Lempuyang), one of the nine directional temples of Bali, is located on the western slopes of Gunung Lempuyang.
Gunung Pohon	2063 m	Bedugul volcanic area	Gunung Pohon is a dormant stratovolcano in the Bedugul region. It is just southwest of Bedugul itself. Its height of 2,063 m makes it Bali's sixth-highest peak.
Gunung Prapat Agung	322 m	Gunung Prapat Agung	Gunung Prapat Agung is a small mountain on the peninsula at Bali's north-western tip. It is part of Bali Barat National Park and is 322 meters high. Prapat Agung consists mainly of limestone, making it one of three places in Bali to do so (the others are the Bukit Peninsula and Nusa Penida.
Gunung Sengayang	2087 m	Bedugul volcanic area	Gunung Sengayang is a dormant stratovolcano in the Bedugul volcanic area. Its total height is 2,087 m, making it Bali's fifth-highest. Sengayang is almost completely ignored by climbers due to its isolated situation north of Gunung Batukaru, west of Gunung Adeng and Pohen, and south of Gunung Lesong.
Gunung Merbuk	1359 m	Jembrana Regency	Mount Merbuk is the fourth tallest peak in Bali and its third tallest active volcano. Mount Merbuk hasn't erupted since the Pleistocene Era, which means at least 11,700 years ago and up to 2 million years ago!

== See also ==
- Geography of Indonesia
- List of volcanoes in Indonesia
