= Sungi River =

River on Bali, Indonesia

Coordinates: 8.4963°S 115.1729°E

Sungi River Sungai Sungi
- Native name: Tukad Sungi (Sundanese)

Location
- Country: Indonesia
- State: Bali

Physical characteristics
- Mouth: Yeh Sungi
  - location: Badung Regency
  - elevation: 6 m (20 ft)

Sungi River source and mouth in Bali

The Sungi River is a river in Bali, Indonesia. Its source is located in the mountainous area in the central-northern part of Bali. It flows through the ancient site of Mengwi and enters the sea to the west of Kerobokan Kelod on the southern coast.

The Sungi River forms most of the eastern boundary of the Tabanan Regency and provides irrigation water for 4,200 ha of sawah (rice paddies) within one regency (kabupaten) alone.

== History ==
The first King of Mengwi, the Lord of Balayu, built a dam over the Sungi River. According to Henk Schulte Nordholt, this dam was very important for the economy along the river bank, providing needed irrigation for the people to prosper.

== Geography ==
The river flows in the middle to the south of Bali with a predominantly tropical rainforest climate (designated as Af in the Köppen-Geiger climate classification). The annual average temperature in the area is 24 °C (75 °F). The warmest month is October when the average temperature is around 25 °C (77 °F), and the coldest is July, at 22 °C (72 °F). The average annual rainfall is 2,123 mm (83.6 in). The wettest month is January, with an average of 569 mm (22.4 in) of rainfall, and the driest is September, with 23 mm (0.9 in) of rainfall.

Sungi River

Climate chart (precipitation, max. and min. temperature)
J	F	M	A	M	J	J	A	S	O	N	D
569 27 21	257 26 22	255 26 22	117 26 22	127 27 21	98 26 21	86 25 19	24 25 19	23 27 20	30 29 21	173 28 21	365 27 21
- █ Average max. and min. temperatures in °C
- █ Precipitation totals in mm
Imperial conversion
J	F	M	A	M	J	J	A	S	O	N	D
22 81 70	10 79 72	10 79 72	4.6 79 72	5 81 70	3.9 79 70	3.4 77 66	0.9 77 66	0.9 81 68	1.2 84 70	6.8 82 70	14 81 70
- █ Average max. and min. temperatures in °F
- █ Precipitation totals in inches

== See also ==
- List of bodies of water in Bali
- List of drainage basins of Indonesia
- List of rivers of Indonesia
- List of rivers of Lesser Sunda Islands
