= Kadassa River =

River in Indonesia

Coordinates: 9.3938°S 120.0269°E

Kadassa River Luku Kadahang, Sungai Kadahang, Luku Kadassa, Sungai Kadassa, Maharang River, Loekoe Kadaha, Loekoe Kadessa, Soengai Kadessa, Kadaha River, Rivier Kadesa, Luku Kadaha of Kadassa
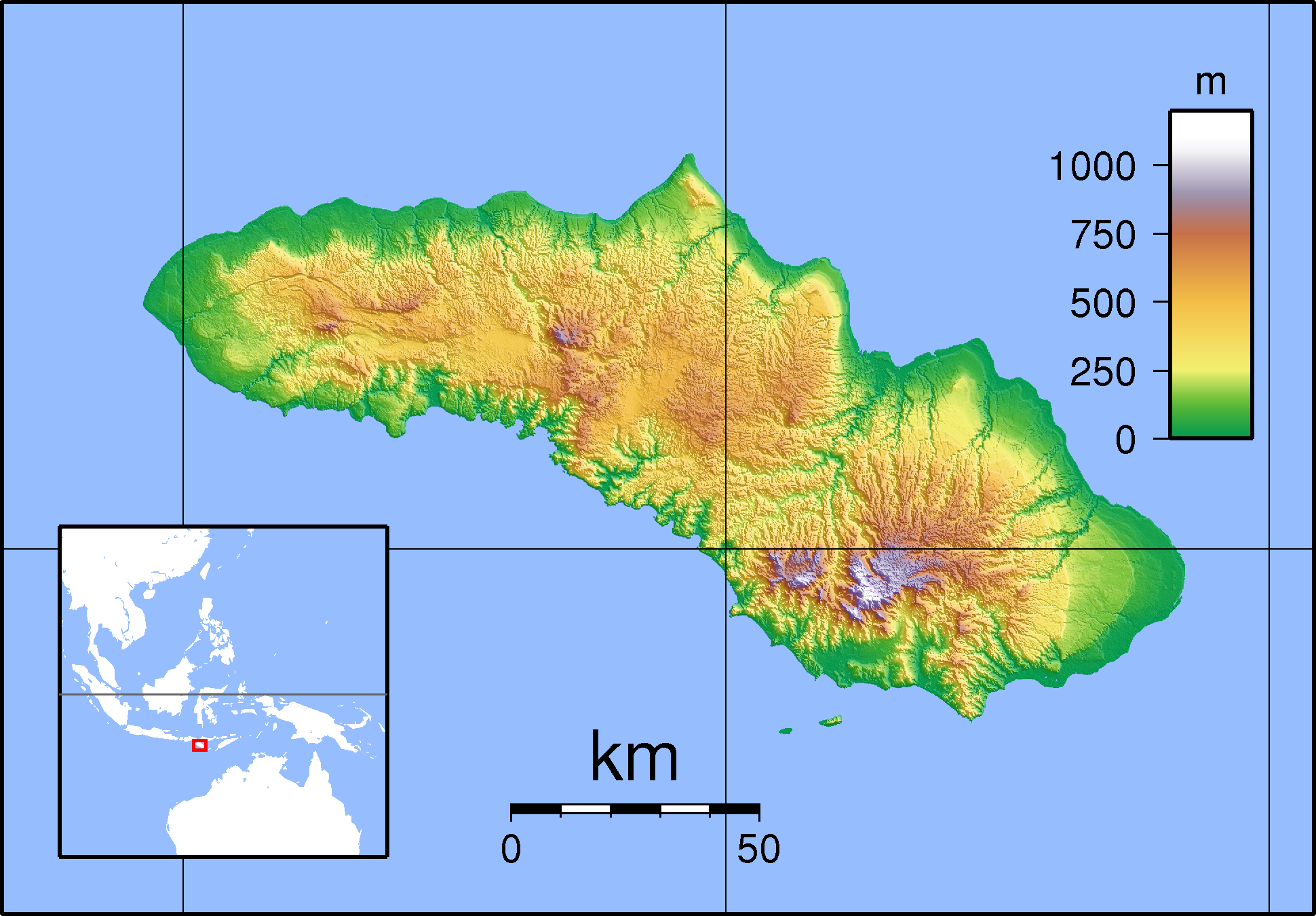
- Location of the mouth Kadassa River (Indonesia)

Location
- Country: Indonesia

Physical characteristics
- Source
  - location: Sumba
- Mouth: Sawu Sea

The Kadassa River (Indonesian: Luku Kadahang) is a river of Sumba, East Nusa Tenggara, Indonesia.

== Geography ==
The river flows along the northern area of Sumba with predominantly tropical savanna climate (designated as As in the Köppen-Geiger climate classification). The annual average temperature in the area is 26 °C. The warmest month is October, when the average temperature is around 32 °C, and the coldest is January, at 24 °C. The average annual rainfall is 1441 mm. The wettest month is February, with an average of 206 mm rainfall, and the driest is September, with 8 mm rainfall.

Luku Kadahang

Climate chart (precipitation, max. and min. temperature)
| J | F | M | A | M | J | J | A | S | O | N | D |
| 222 25 22 | 257 27 22 | 207 27 23 | 172 25 23 | 127 30 23 | 47 27 22 | 31 30 21 | 13 32 21 | 8 37 22 | 33 40 24 | 99 35 24 | 225 27 22 |
- █ Average max. and min. temperatures in °C
- █ Precipitation totals in mm
Imperial conversion
| J | F | M | A | M | J | J | A | S | O | N | D |
| 8.7 77 72 | 10 81 72 | 8.1 81 73 | 6.8 77 73 | 5 86 73 | 1.9 81 72 | 1.2 86 70 | 0.5 90 70 | 0.3 99 72 | 1.3 104 75 | 3.9 95 75 | 8.9 81 72 |
- █ Average max. and min. temperatures in °F
- █ Precipitation totals in inches

== See also ==
- List of drainage basins of Indonesia
- List of rivers of Indonesia
- List of rivers of Lesser Sunda Islands
