= Melolo River =

River in Indonesia

Coordinates: 9.87312°S 120.66059°E

Melolo River Sungai Melolo, Luku Melolu, Koeala Melolo, Rivier Melolo
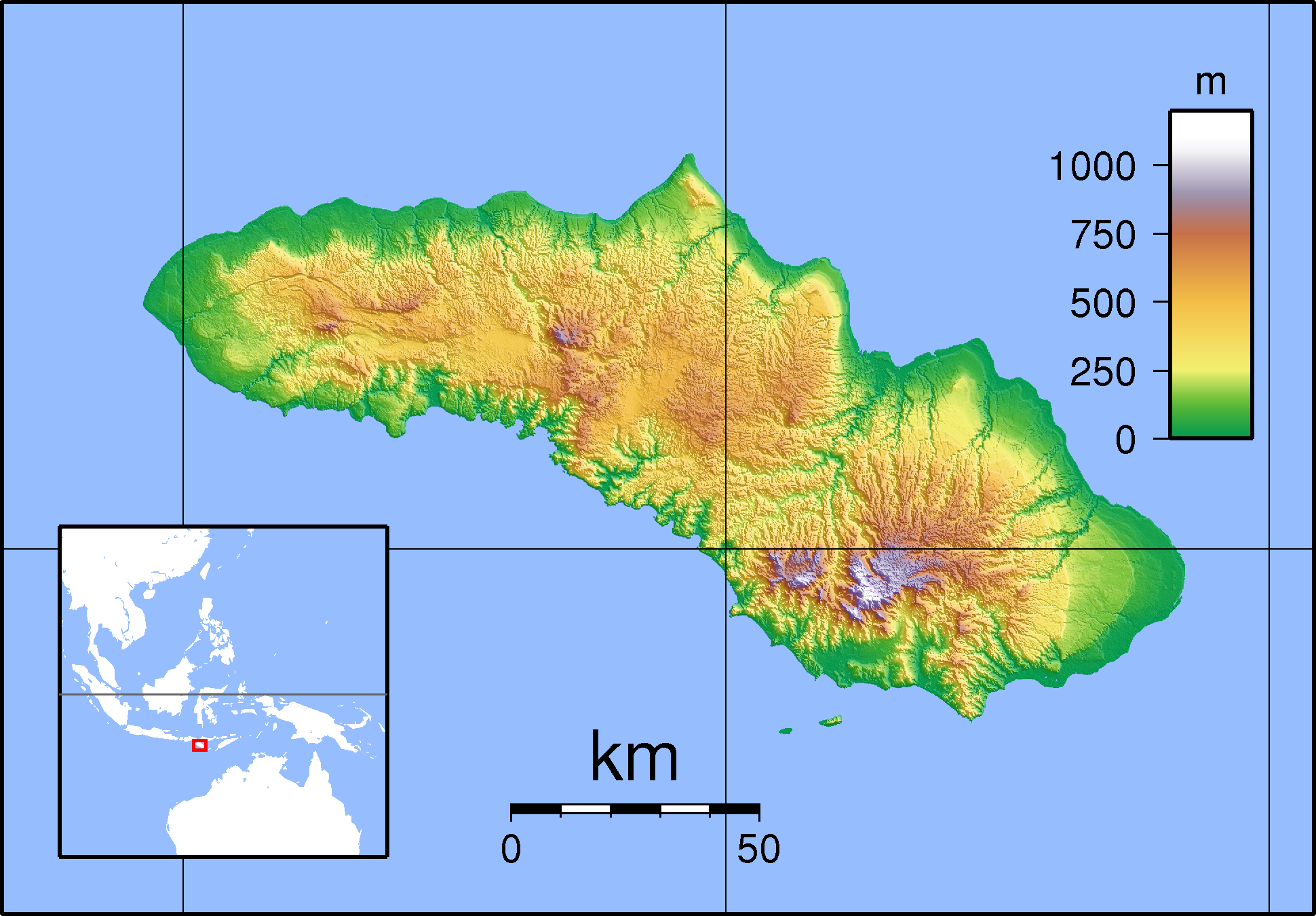
- Location of the mouth Melolo River (Indonesia)

Location
- Country: Indonesia

Physical characteristics
- Source
  - location: Sumba
- Mouth: Sawu Sea

The Melolo River is a river of Sumba, Indonesia.

== Geography ==
The river flows along the northern area of Sumba with predominantly tropical savanna climate (designated as As in the Köppen-Geiger climate classification). The annual average temperature in the area is 27 °C. The warmest month is October, when the average temperature is around 32 °C, and the coldest is January, at 24 °C. The average annual rainfall is 966 mm. The wettest month is December, with an average of 206 mm rainfall, and the driest is August, with 4 mm rainfall.

Luku Melolo

Climate chart (precipitation, max. and min. temperature)
J	F	M	A	M	J	J	A	S	O	N	D
168 25 24	195 28 24	126 29 23	118 25 23	42 29 22	28 30 21	12 30 21	4 33 20	4 37 23	5 40 24	58 36 25	206 25 23
- █ Average max. and min. temperatures in °C
- █ Precipitation totals in mm
Imperial conversion
J	F	M	A	M	J	J	A	S	O	N	D
6.6 77 75	7.7 82 75	5 84 73	4.6 77 73	1.7 84 72	1.1 86 70	0.5 86 70	0.2 91 68	0.2 99 73	0.2 104 75	2.3 97 77	8.1 77 73
- █ Average max. and min. temperatures in °F
- █ Precipitation totals in inches

== See also ==
- List of drainage basins of Indonesia
- List of rivers of Indonesia
- List of rivers of Lesser Sunda Islands
