= Kadumbul River =

River in Indonesia

Coordinates: 9.68931°S 120.51519°E

Kadumbul River Luku Kadumbul, Sungai Kadumbul, Koeala Kadoemboel, Loekoe Kadoemboel, Rivier Kadoemboe
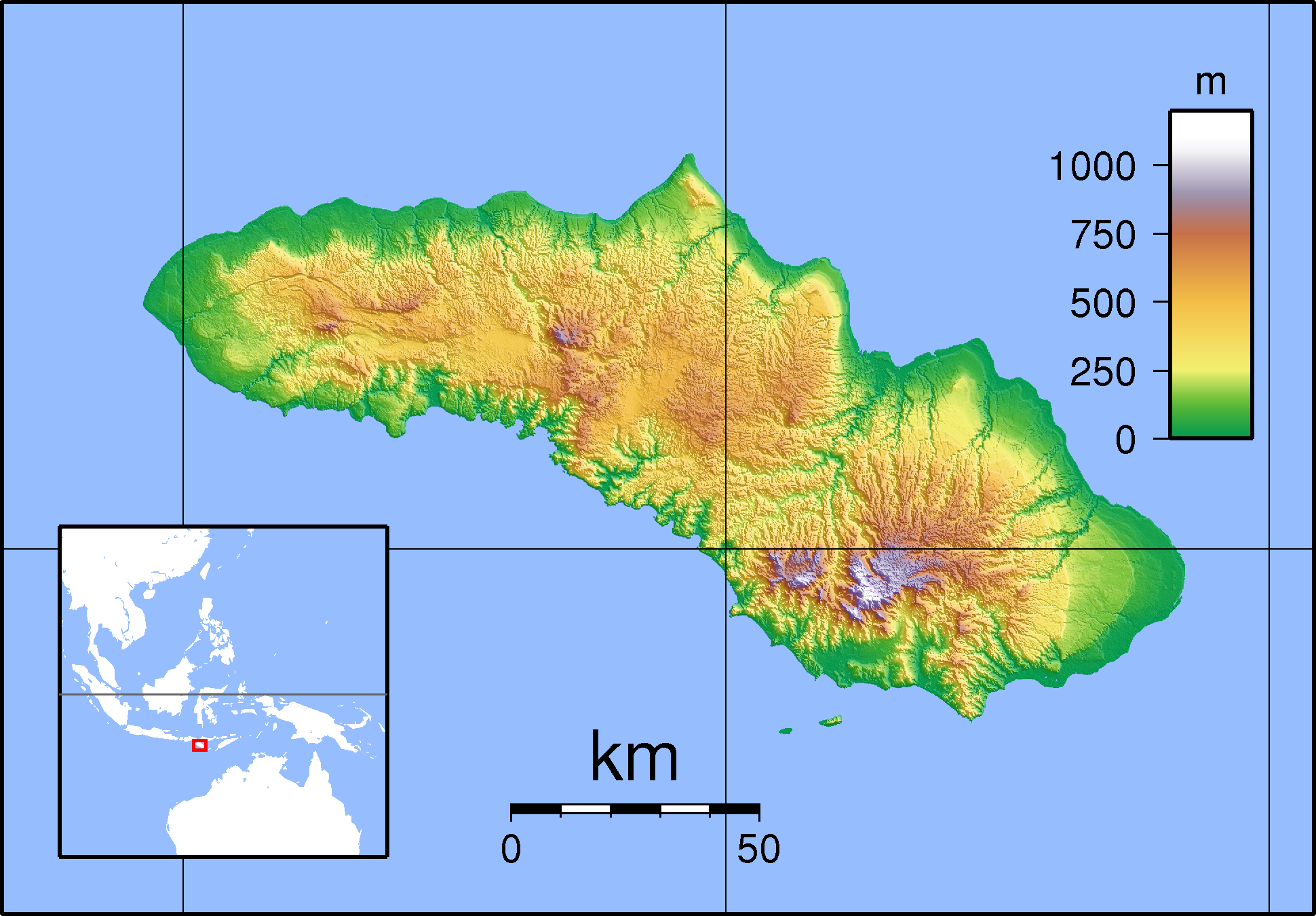
- Location of the mouth Kadumbul River (Indonesia)

Location
- Country: Indonesia

Physical characteristics
- Source
  - location: Sumba
- Mouth: Sawu Sea

The Kadumbul River is a river of Sumba, East Nusa Tenggara, Indonesia.

== Geography ==
The river flows along the northern area of Sumba with predominantly tropical savanna climate (designated as As in the Köppen-Geiger climate classification). The annual average temperature in the area is 28 °C. The warmest month is October, when the average temperature is around 32 °C, and the coldest is January, at 25 °C. The average annual rainfall is 966 mm. The wettest month is December, with an average of 206 mm rainfall, and the driest is August, with 4 mm rainfall.

Luku Kadumbul

Climate chart (precipitation, max. and min. temperature)
J	F	M	A	M	J	J	A	S	O	N	D
168 27 23	195 30 24	126 29 23	118 28 24	42 30 23	28 30 21	12 31 21	4 34 22	4 37 22	5 41 24	58 38 25	206 33 23
- █ Average max. and min. temperatures in °C
- █ Precipitation totals in mm
Imperial conversion
J	F	M	A	M	J	J	A	S	O	N	D
6.6 81 73	7.7 86 75	5 84 73	4.6 82 75	1.7 86 73	1.1 86 70	0.5 88 70	0.2 93 72	0.2 99 72	0.2 106 75	2.3 100 77	8.1 91 73
- █ Average max. and min. temperatures in °F
- █ Precipitation totals in inches

== See also ==
- List of drainage basins of Indonesia
- List of rivers of Indonesia
- List of rivers of Lesser Sunda Islands
