= Kambaniru River =

River in Indonesia

Kambaniru River Loekoe Kambaniroe; Sungai Kambera, Rivier Kambera, Kokok Kambaniroe, Loekoe Kambera, Kokok Kambera, Kambaniroe River
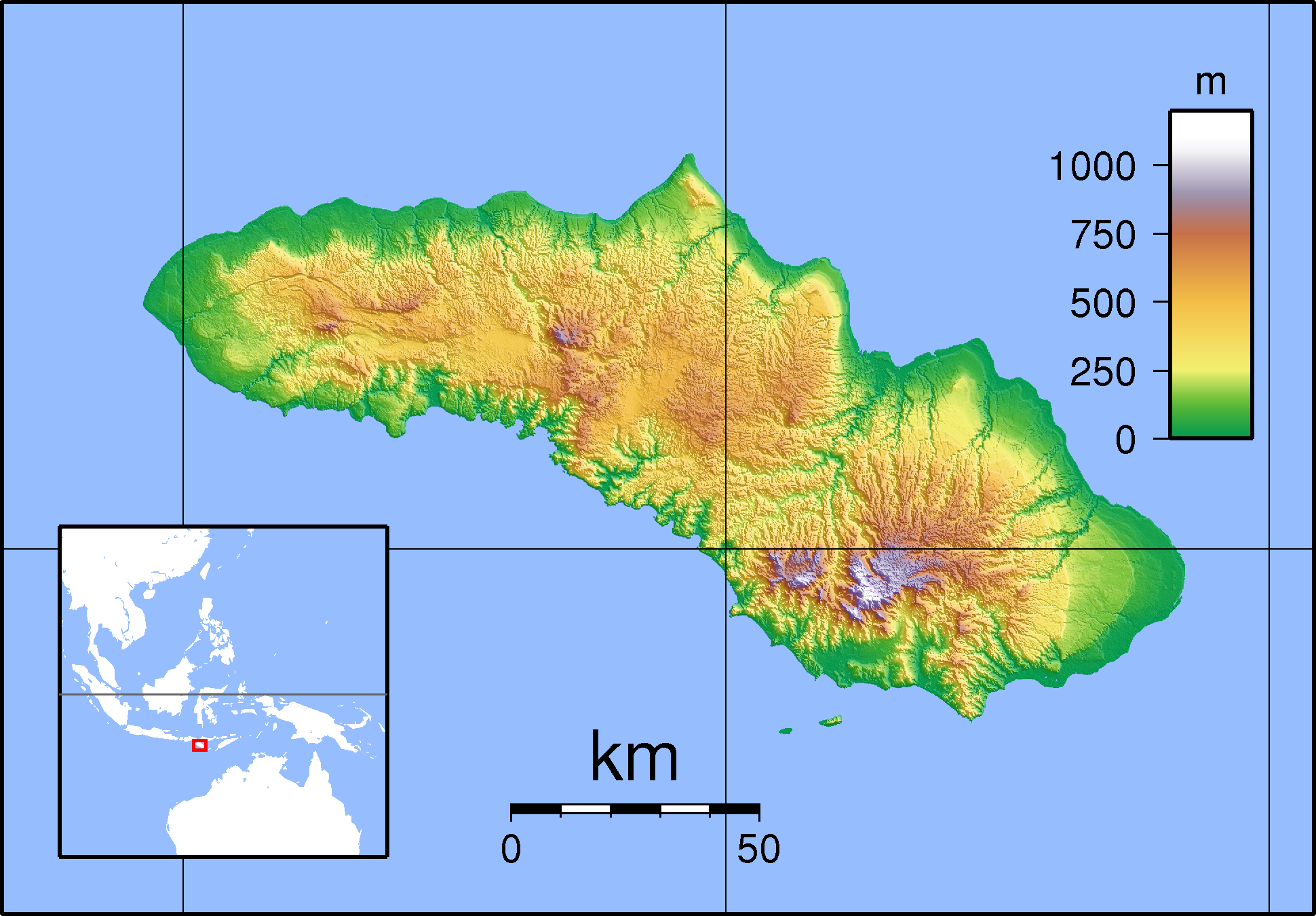
- Location of the mouth Kambaniru River (Indonesia)
- Native name: Luku Kambaniru (Kambera); Sungai Kambaniru (Indonesian)

Location
- Country: Indonesia
- Province: East Nusa Tenggara
- Region: East Sumba Regency
- City: Waingapu

Physical characteristics
- Source: Mount Wanggameti
  - location: Wangga Meti, Matawai La Pawu
  - elevation: 1,225 ft (373 m)
- Mouth: Sawu Sea
  - location: Kawangu, Pandawai
  - coordinates: 9°40′04″S 120°19′23″E
  - elevation: 0 m (0 ft)

The Kambaniru River (Indonesian: Sungai Kambaniru; Sumba name: Luku Kambaniru) is a river in the island of Sumba, Indonesia, about 1,500 km east of the capital Jakarta. With a length of approximately 118 km, it flows periodically through 9 districts in the East Sumba Regency, exiting to the Bay of Kambaniru (Indonesian: Teluk Kambaniru) near the city of Waingapu to the Sawu Sea, with high debit in the wet season, but very low in the dry season.

== Hydrology ==
The drainage basin of Kambaniru covers an area of 111,000 hectare, comprising 34 villages and 8 administrative districts. The area suffers from heavy degradation, requiring massive rehabilitation. Although quite low in water during the dry season, the river floods the banks yearly during the wet season, due to the minimal flood control programs. The lack of bridges forces elementary school students of Bidipraing to cross the river width of 65 metres and the depth of 1.2 metres daily to go to school in the village of Kiritanah, Kambera.

Kambaniru Dam was finished on 8 September 1992, located 10 km from the city of Waingapu, is the biggest dam in the regency, providing water to 1,440 hectares of rice fields in Mauliru, Kawangu and Kambaniru. The dam is located in the village of Malumbi, Kambera.

== Geography ==
The river flows along the northern area of Sumba with predominantly tropical savanna climate (designated as As in the Köppen-Geiger climate classification). The annual average temperature in the area is 27 °C. The warmest month is October, when the average temperature is around 31 °C, and the coldest is June, at 24 °C. The average annual rainfall is 1203 mm. The wettest month is December, with an average of 257 mm rainfall, and the driest is August, with 2 mm rainfall.

Kambaniru River

Climate chart (precipitation, max. and min. temperature)
J	F	M	A	M	J	J	A	S	O	N	D
183 31 22	215 28 22	191 29 22	129 29 22	53 29 21	44 28 20	5 30 19	2 33 20	3 37 21	13 40 22	109 38 23	257 34 23
- █ Average max. and min. temperatures in °C
- █ Precipitation totals in mm
Imperial conversion
J	F	M	A	M	J	J	A	S	O	N	D
7.2 88 72	8.5 82 72	7.5 84 72	5.1 84 72	2.1 84 70	1.7 82 68	0.2 86 66	0.1 91 68	0.1 99 70	0.5 104 72	4.3 100 73	10 93 73
- █ Average max. and min. temperatures in °F
- █ Precipitation totals in inches

== Song ==
In 1963 Ms. Mathilda Taka (Mrs. Daniswan Anwar) composed a song about this river titled "Kambaniru" which was famous in the 1960s.

== See also ==
- List of drainage basins of Indonesia
- List of rivers of Indonesia
- List of rivers of Lesser Sunda Islands
