= Wanokaka River =

River in Indonesia

Coordinates: 9.75°S 119.46667°E

Sungai Wanokaka Wano Kaka, Luku Wonokaka
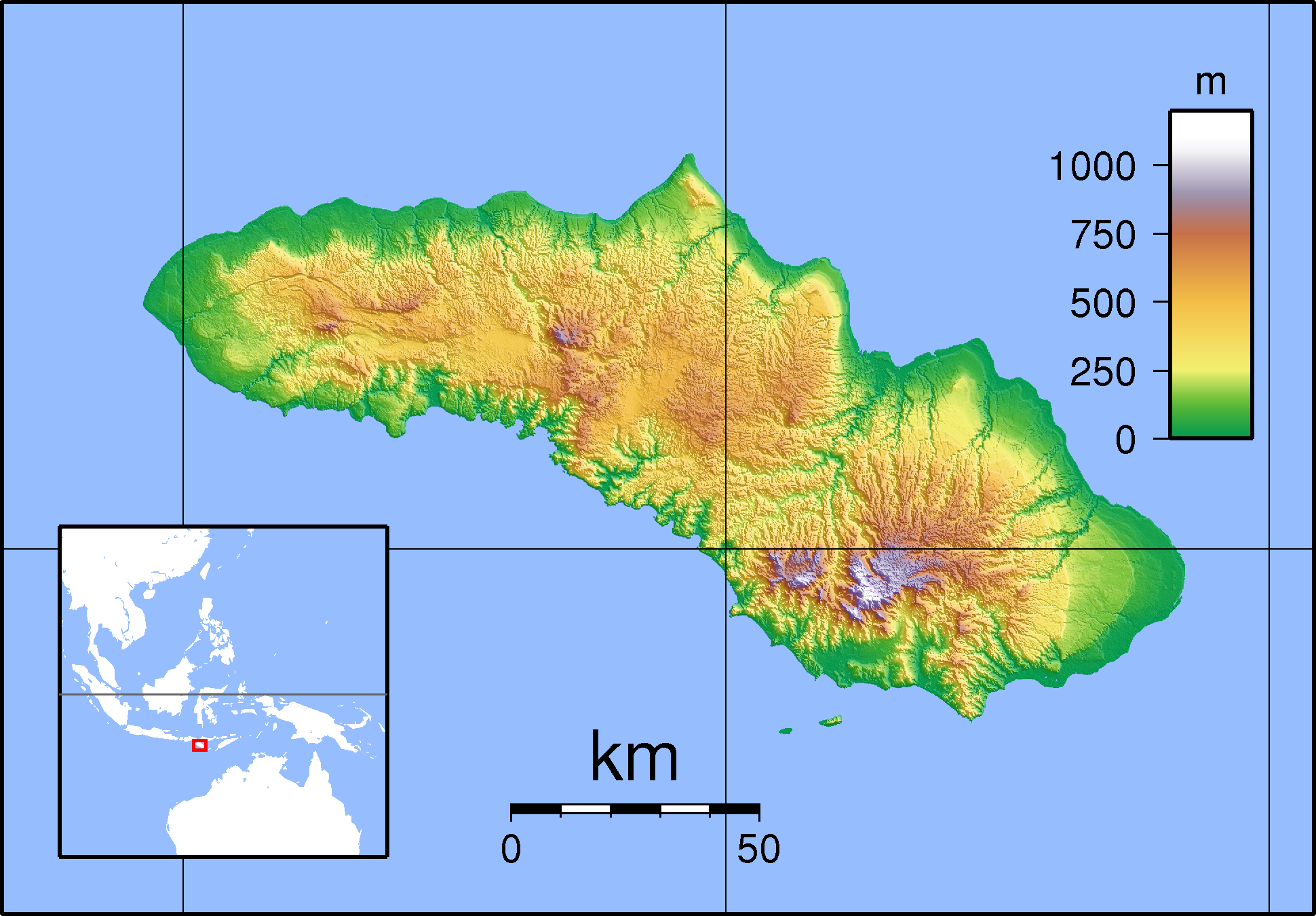
- Lokasi muara Wanokaka River (Indonesia)

Location
- Country: Indonesia

Physical characteristics
- Source: Manupeu Tanah Daru National Park
  - location: Sumba, East Nusa Tenggara
  - elevation: 500 m (1,600 ft)
- Mouth: Indian Ocean
  - location: West Sumba Regency
- Length: 80 km (50 mi)

The Wanokaka River is a river in Sumba island, Province of East Nusa Tenggara, Indonesia. It is located a few kilometers south of Waikabubak, with the District of Wanokaka (Wanukaka), east of the District of Lamboya.

== Hydrology ==
The Wanokaka River flows from east to west before turning to the south into the Indian Ocean at a length of 80 km. The upstream is at the hills Manupeu Tanah Daru National Park, village of Liangudongo, Konda Maloba Utara, District of Katikutana, Central Sumba Regency and discharges into Indian Ocean near Wanokaka Beach in the village of Desa Waihura, District of Wanokaka, West Sumba Regency. The river is famous for two waterfalls, namely Matayangu and Lapopu waterfall.

=== Tributaries ===
Some tributaries flow to this river among others: the Labariri River, Lahihagalang River, Kerimaraga River, Kihi River, Lakaraha River, Waikajelung River, Lokomara River, and Katamawai River.

== Geography ==
The river flows along the southern area of Sumba with predominantly tropical savanna climate (designated as As in the Köppen-Geiger climate classification). The annual average temperature in the area is 24 °C. The warmest month is April, when the average temperature is around 26 °C, and the coldest is January, at 22 °C. The average annual rainfall is 1731 mm. The wettest month is December, with an average of 356 mm rainfall, and the driest is August, with 10 mm rainfall.

Luku Wonokaka

Climate chart (precipitation, max. and min. temperature)
J	F	M	A	M	J	J	A	S	O	N	D
273 24 20	303 26 23	222 25 24	151 26 26	94 26 25	48 24 24	22 24 23	10 25 23	18 26 23	45 27 25	189 27 24	356 25 21
- █ Average max. and min. temperatures in °C
- █ Precipitation totals in mm
Imperial conversion
J	F	M	A	M	J	J	A	S	O	N	D
11 75 68	12 79 73	8.7 77 75	5.9 79 79	3.7 79 77	1.9 75 75	0.9 75 73	0.4 77 73	0.7 79 73	1.8 81 77	7.4 81 75	14 77 70
- █ Average max. and min. temperatures in °F
- █ Precipitation totals in inches

== Uses ==
The Wanokaka River is utilized for irrigation with Lahikaninu Weir in West Sumba Regency.

== See also ==
- List of drainage basins of Indonesia
- List of rivers of Indonesia
- List of rivers of Lesser Sunda Islands
