= Badung Strait =

Strait in Indonesia

- selat Badung (Indonesian) ségara Badung, ᬲᬾᬕᬭᬩᬤᬸᬂ (Balinese)
- Location within Bali
- Coordinates: 8°37′50″S 115°23′17″E
- Type: strait
- Basin countries: Indonesia
- Max. length: 60 kilometres (37 mi)
- Max. width: 20 kilometres (12 mi)
- References: Selat Badung: Indonesia National Geospatial-Intelligence Agency, Bethesda, MD, USA

Badung Strait is a strait on the south east side of Bali in Indonesia. It lies between the islands of Bali and Nusa Penida. It is about 60 km long and 20 km wide.

== History ==
In February 1942, the battle of Badung Strait was fought in this strait.

It is usually reported as a body of water that has accidents and mishaps.

== Tourist attractions ==
On the shores of the bay are resort and tourist areas, which are widely known internationally, in particular, Nusa Dua, Tanjung Benoa and Sanur.
