= Wera River =

River in Flores, Indonesia,

Wera River Wae Wera, Sungai Wera
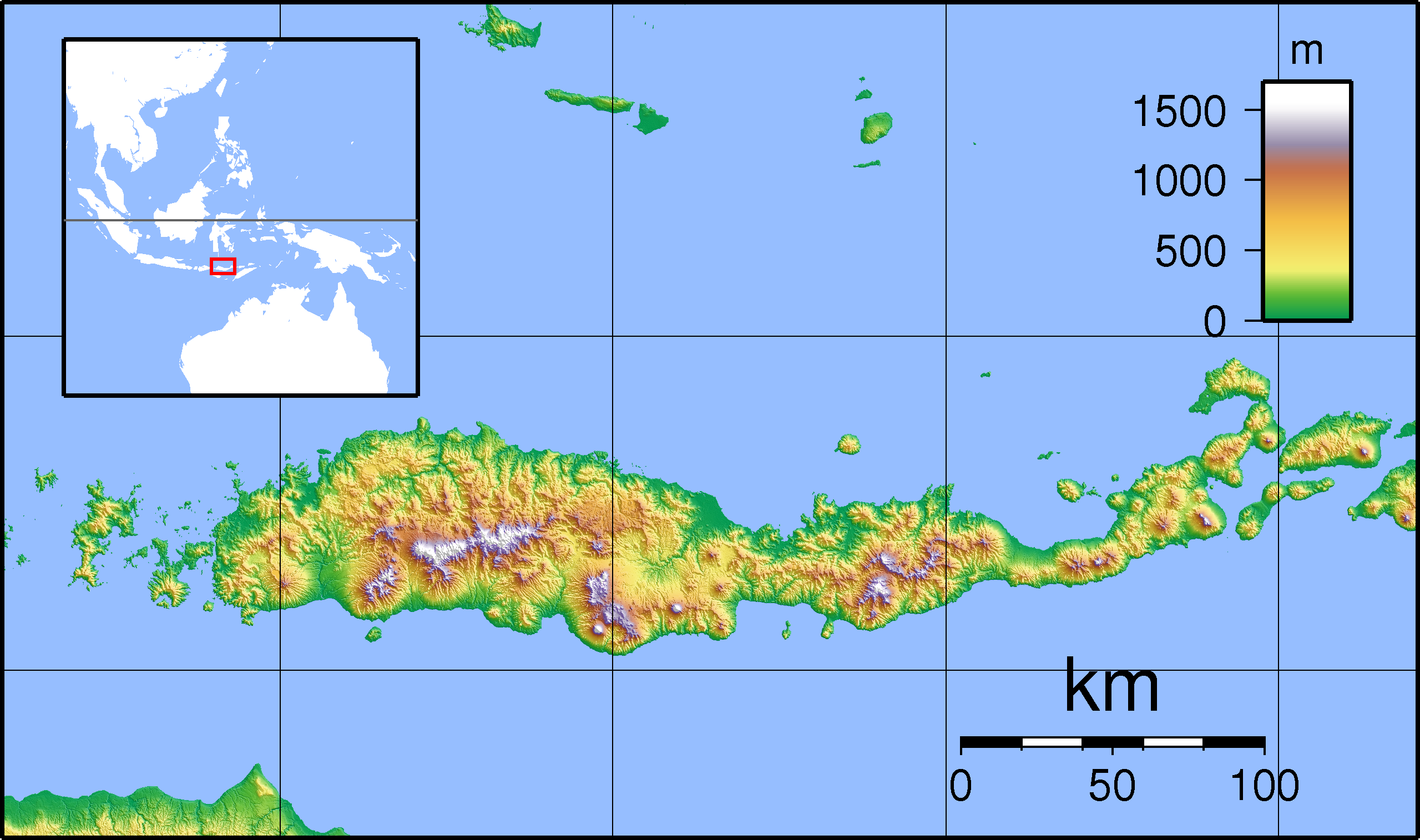
- Location of the river Wera River (Lesser Sunda Islands) Wera River (Indonesia)

Location
- Country: Indonesia

Physical characteristics
- Source: Watu Tunggur National Reserve
  - location: Bombong, West Manggarai Regency
  - coordinates: 8.5366003°S 120.280016°E
- 2nd source: Poco Mandasawu montain; Golo Lusang Manggarai National forest;
  - location: Langke Rembong, Manggarai Regency, East Nusa Tenggara
  - coordinates: 8.6123238°S 120.4218033°E
- Mouth
  - location: Reok Manggarai Timur Regency
  - coordinates: 8.2940482°S 120.4838339°E
- Basin size: 1,081 km^{2} (417 mi^{2})

Basin features
- River system: Reo Waepesi basin (DAS420815)
- Cities: Reok (Reo); Ruteng
- Bridges: Reok bridge
- River Basin Management Unit: BPDAS Benain Noelmina

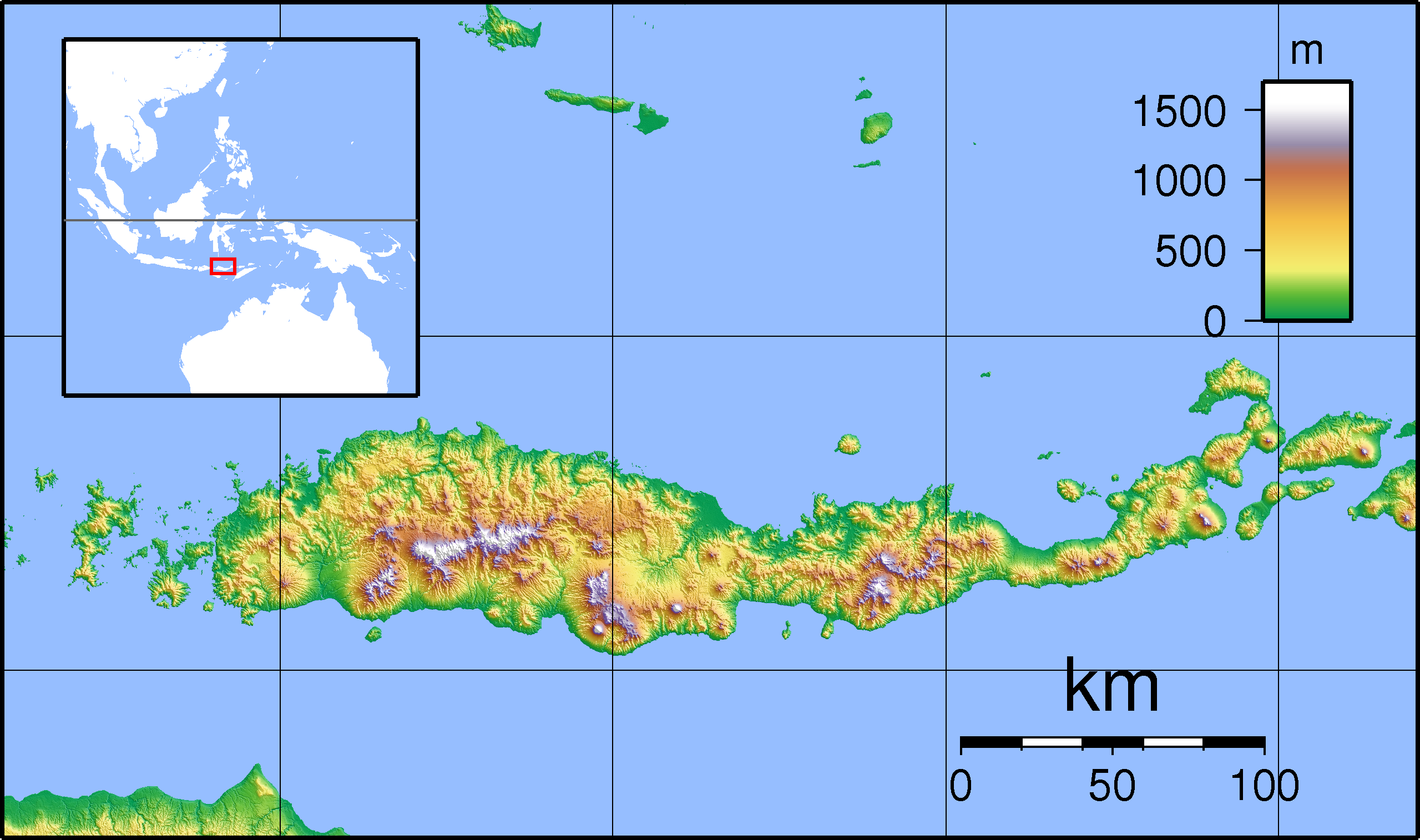
Wae Wera River

The Wera River (Wae Wera) is a river of Flores, East Nusa Tenggara province, Indonesia, about 1500 km east of the capital Jakarta.

== Hydrology ==
The Wera River flows in the Manggarai Timur Regency and during wet season, the current is quite high to threaten the damage of "Wae Wera Bridge" in the village of Nanga Baras, Sambi Rampas district, or the northern main traffic route of Flores.

== Geography ==
The river flows in the middle to the north of Flores with predominantly tropical savanna climate (designated as Aw in the Köppen-Geiger climate classification). The annual average temperature in the area is 26 °C. The warmest month is November, when the average temperature is around 30 °C, and the coldest is February, at 23 °C. The average annual rainfall is 1686 mm. The wettest month is January, with an average of 302 mm rainfall, and the driest is September, with 8 mm rainfall.

== See also ==
- List of drainage basins of Indonesia
- List of rivers of Indonesia
- List of rivers of Lesser Sunda Islands
