= Mina River (Indonesia) =

River in Indonesia

Mina River Sungai Mina, Mina Riva, Missa River, Noil Mina, Noil Besiam, Besian River, Noel Mina
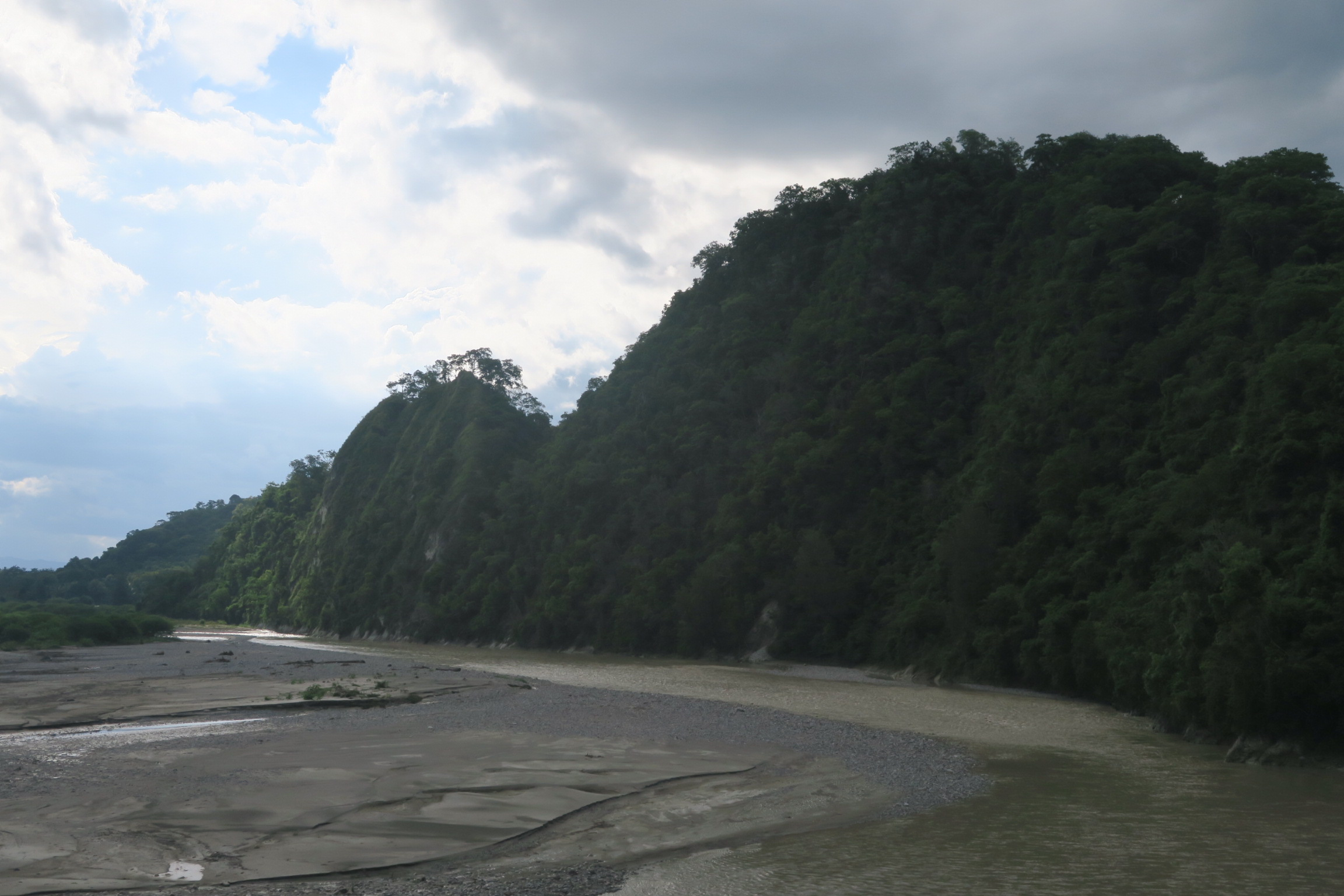
- Native name: Noel Mina (Indonesian)

Location
- Country: Indonesia

Physical characteristics
- Source
  - location: Timor
- Mouth: Timor Sea
  - location: Kupang; Timor Tengah Selatan
  - coordinates: 10.16135°S 124.21115°E
- Length: 100 km (62 mi)

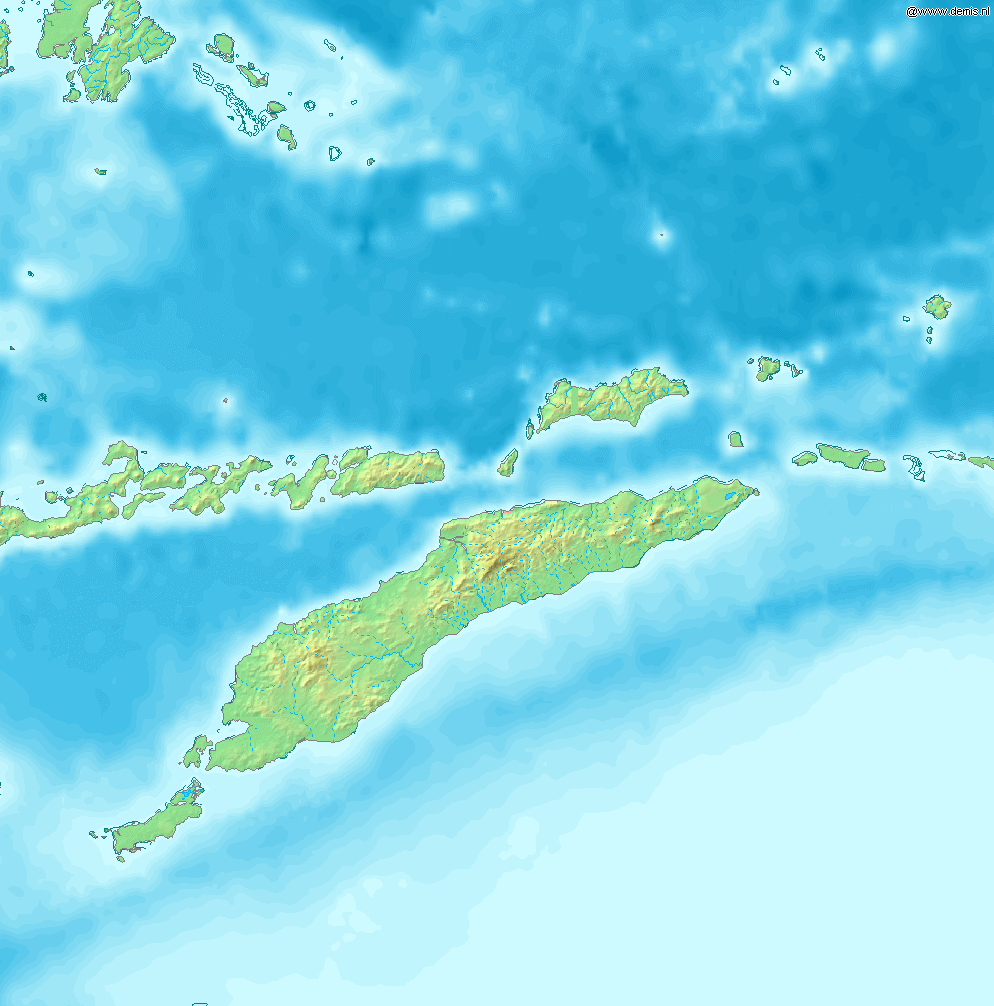
Mina river mouth

The Mina River (Noel Mina) is a river of Timor, in the province of East Nusa Tenggara, Indonesia, about 2000 km east of the capital Jakarta. Above this river also stretches the Noelmina Bridge which connects Kupang with the South Central Timor Regency.

== Hydrology ==
The Mina River is one of the main rivers in Kupang and Timor Tengah Selatan Regency. The river area of the Mina comprises the watershed (Daerah Aliran Sungai/DAS) Noel Mina, Noel Termanu and Nungkurus; one of two river areas (other than Benanain River Area) in West Timor.

== Geography ==
The river flows in the southwest of Timor with predominantly tropical savanna climate (designated as Aw in the Köppen-Geiger climate classification). The annual average temperature in the area is 26 °C. The warmest month is November, when the average temperature is around 29 °C, and the coldest is June, at 23 °C. The average annual rainfall is 1760 mm. The wettest month is January, with an average of 305 mm rainfall, and the driest is September, with 5 mm rainfall.

== See also ==
- List of drainage basins of Indonesia
- List of rivers of Indonesia
- List of rivers of West Timor
