= Polapare River =

River in Indonesia

Coordinates: 9.7133°S 119.1074°E

Polapare River Kali Polapari, Loko Polapari, Sungai Polapare, Loko Polapare, Lokoe Palaparé
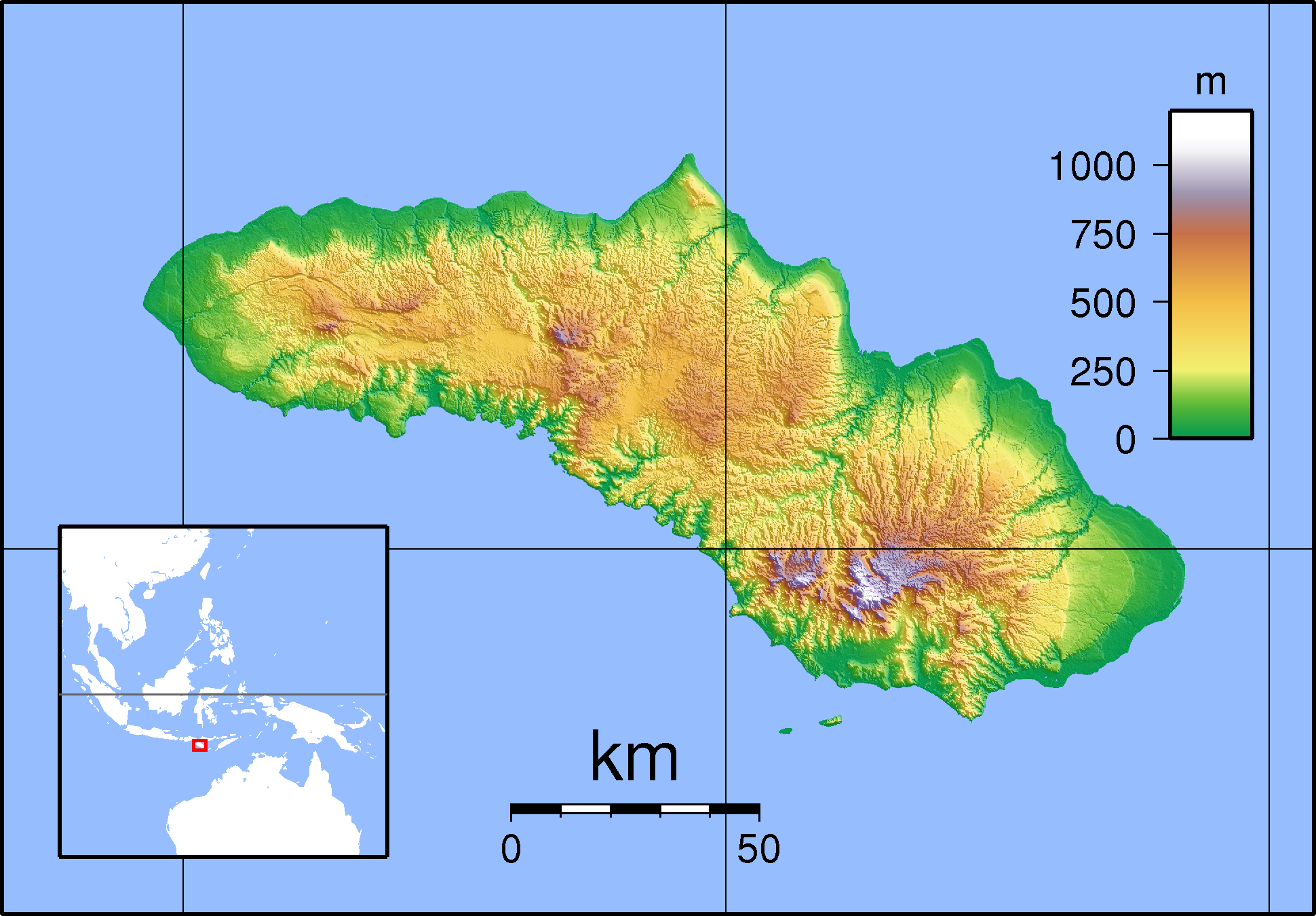
- Location of the mouth Polapare River (Indonesia)

Location
- Country: Indonesia

Physical characteristics
- Source
  - location: Sumba
- Mouth: Mananga Malandoh, Indian Ocean
  - location: Sumba Barat Daya Regency
  - elevation: 1 m (3 ft 3 in)
- Length: 18 km (11 mi)

The Polapare River (Indonesian: Kali Polapari) is a river of Sumba Barat Daya Regency in the island of Sumba, East Nusa Tenggara, Indonesia. The length of the river is 18 km. Offshore of the river mouth are the islands of Baholokmonegoro and Barenggemonokodi; Malondobara Island is 1¼ km to the west.

== Geography ==
The river flows along the southwestern area of Sumba with predominantly tropical monsoon climate (designated as Am in the Köppen–Geiger climate classification system). The annual average temperature in the area is 24 °C. The warmest month is October, when the average temperature is around 28 °C, and the coldest is March, at 23 °C. The average annual rainfall is 2377 mm The wettest month is January, with an average of 444 mm rainfall, and the driest is August, with 15 mm rainfall.

== Uses ==
The Polapare River is developed to be a microhydro energy source.

== See also ==
- List of drainage basins of Indonesia
- List of rivers of Indonesia
- List of rivers of Lesser Sunda Islands
