= Sissa River =

River in Flores, Indonesia

Sissa River Ai Sissa, Ai Sisa, Waesesa, Wae Woki River
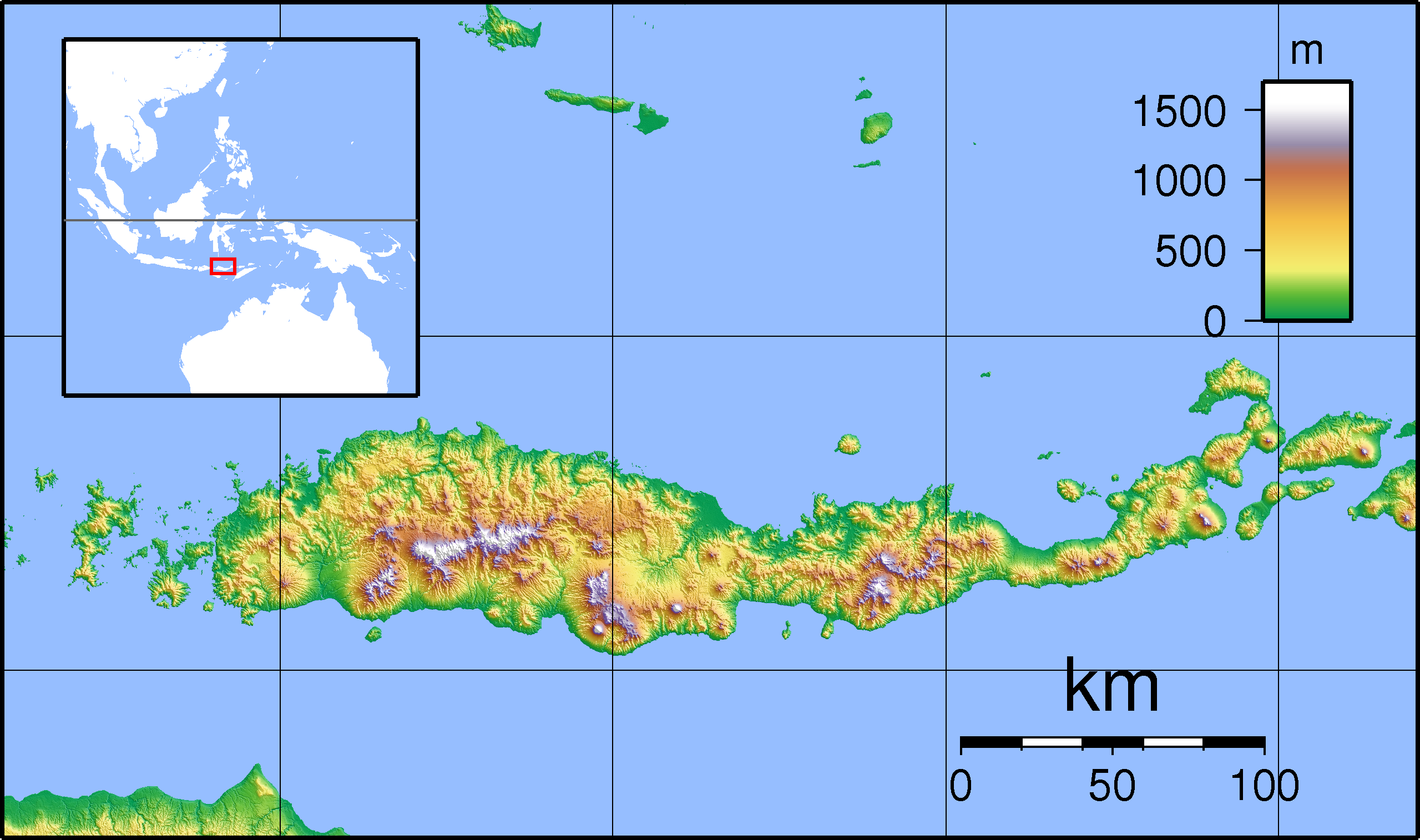
- Location of the river Sissa River (Lesser Sunda Islands) Sissa River (Indonesia)
- Native name: Aesesa (Indonesian)

Location
- Country: Indonesia
- State: East Nusa Tenggara

Physical characteristics
- Source: Inielika
  - location: Flores
  - elevation: 1,400 m (4,600 ft)
- Mouth: Flores Sea
  - coordinates: 8°29′S 121°18′E
- Length: 87 km (54 mi)
- Basin size: 1,230 km^{2} (470 sq mi)
- Discharge
  - average: 7.5 m^{3}/s (260 cu ft/s)

The Sissa River (Aesesa River) is a river of Flores, East Nusa Tenggara, Indonesia. The 87-km river flows from a southwest to northeast direction, with the upstream at Mount Inielika north of Bajawa, Ngada Regency, and discharges into the Flores Sea near Mbay, Nagekeo Regency.

== Hydrology ==
The watershed (Indonesian: Daerah Aliran Sungai/DAS) Aesesa has an area of 1,230 km^{2} with a round form, comprising two regencies: Ngada Regency and Nagekeo Regency. The upstream at Ngada Regency near Bajawa is called "Wae Woki River". The major tributaries are:

- Ae Mau river
- Lowo Ulu river
- Lowo Langge river
- Lowo Lele river
- Lowo Me Bhada river
- Wae Bia river
- Wae Bhara river

Aesesa river has a length of 87 km with an average discharge of around 7.5 m^{3}/second

== Uses ==
The inhabitants along the Aesesa River use the water for agriculture, with the help of "Sutami Dam" at Nggolo Mbay, District of Aesesa, Nagekeo Regency which distributes the water to farmlands around 6,452 hectares in Nagekeo Regency at an average discharge of 14.69 m^{3}/second. Upstream, there are several waterfalls, like "Ogi Waterfall" and "Soso Waterfall". Ogi waterfall has a height of more than 30 meters and is utilized as a major tourist attraction of Bajawa.

== Geography ==
Aesesa

Climate chart (precipitation, max. and min. temperature)
J	F	M	A	M	J	J	A	S	O	N	D
569 27 21	257 26 22	255 26 22	117 26 22	127 27 21	98 26 21	86 25 19	24 25 19	23 27 20	30 29 21	173 28 21	365 27 21
- █ Average max. and min. temperatures in °C
- █ Precipitation totals in mm
Imperial conversion
J	F	M	A	M	J	J	A	S	O	N	D
22 81 70	10 79 72	10 79 72	4.6 79 72	5 81 70	3.9 79 70	3.4 77 66	0.9 77 66	0.9 81 68	1.2 84 70	6.8 82 70	14 81 70
- █ Average max. and min. temperatures in °F
- █ Precipitation totals in inches

The river flows in the middle to the north of Flores with predominantly tropical savanna climate (designated as Aw in the Köppen-Geiger climate classification). The annual average temperature in the area is 26 °C. The warmest month is November, when the average temperature is around 30 °C, and the coldest is February, at 23 °C. The average annual rainfall is 1686 mm. The wettest month is January, with an average of 302 mm rainfall, and the driest is September, with 8 mm rainfall.

== See also ==
- List of drainage basins of Indonesia
- List of rivers of Indonesia
- List of rivers of Lesser Sunda Islands
