= Ayung River =

River in Bali, Indonesia

Ayung River Jeh Ajung, Tukad Ajung, Yeh Ayung
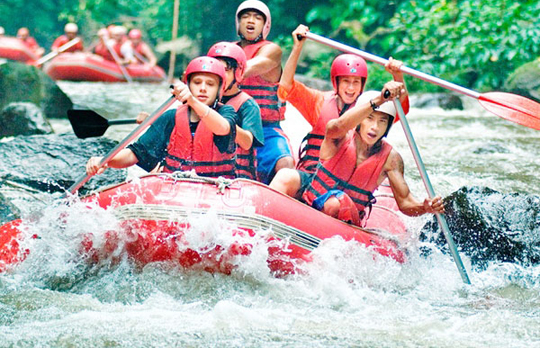

- Ayung river source and mouth in Bali
- Native name: Tukad Ayung (Balinese); Sungai Ayung (Indonesian)

Location
- Country: Indonesia
- State: Bali
- Region: Denpasar
- City: Sanur

Physical characteristics
- Source
  - location: Kintamani
  - coordinates: 8°15′29″S 115°19′43″E
- Mouth: Badung Strait
  - location: Sanur
  - coordinates: 8°39′08″S 115°16′21″E
  - elevation: 0 m (0 ft)
- Length: 68.5 km (42.6 mi)

The Ayung River is the longest river on the Indonesian island of Bali. It runs 68.5 km from the northern mountain ranges, passing the Bangli, Badung, Gianyar regencies and the city of Denpasar, before discharging into the Badung Strait at Sanur. The river is famous for white water rafting.

== Hydrology ==
The drainage basin of the Ayung River covers an area of 109.30 km^{2}, with the tributaries may reach 300.84 km^{2} (about 30,000 ha). The river flows 68.5 km from its source near Kintamani, along the southern slope of the mountains separating the northern and southern areas of Bali, and finally to Padanggalak Beach, Sanur. At upriver, three big tributaries supply the water to the Ayung River, namely Tukad Bangkung with the upstream at Pelaga, Tukad Menggani with the upstream at Catur, and Tukad Siap with the upstream at Kintamani. The confluence of these three tributaries is located at Payangan.

The erosion rate is relatively low in the rice field area upstream and in the middle, due to flatter slopes and good land conservation techniques.

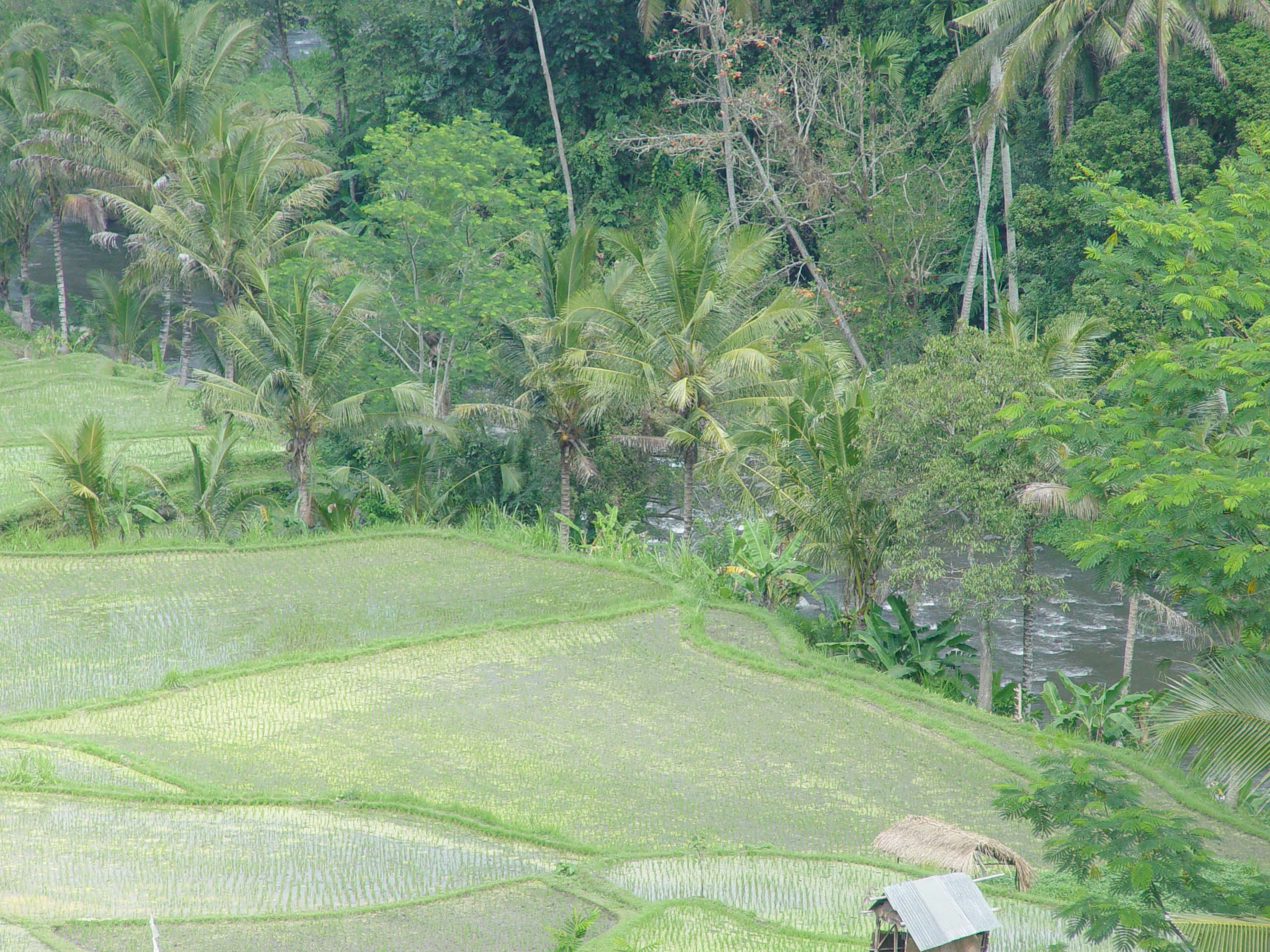
Rice terrace along Ayung River near Kadewatan, Gianyar (2005)

== Geography ==
The Ayung River watershed area has an annual average temperature between 18.4 °C and 26.6 °C, depending on the altitude. The average annual rainfall at the upstream is high, around 1963–3242 mm. Going downstream at an average inclination of 13.13%, the rainfall and the rainy days on the river decrease. In the middle area, the average rainfall is around 1998–3176 mm with 105 -128 average rainy days. At the downstream, near the city of Denpasar, the rainfall becomes low, around 1486 mm with 69 average rainy days.

The drainage basin has two types of topography: mountainous and flat. The water debit measured in 1973-1986 is around 6.6-14.2 m^{3}/second with an average of 8.69 m^{3}/second. The sedimentation level at Buangga shows the highest at 544.4 tons/day and the lowest at 2.8 tons/day, with the calculated total (SCS-USDA method) of 91,393.127 tons/year.

== Land use ==
The main use of the river drainage basin of the Ayung is for agriculture. Scenic views mainly are observed upriver, especially from Petang to Carangsari, with little human influence. Many challenging rapids make this river a good location for rafting.

== Rafting and tourism in general ==
The Ayung River is considered an excellent place for family Rafting because the average power of falls (force 3) allows you to enjoy an inflatable boat ride in the heart of the jungle. The rapids of most family routes (about 33 rapids) are class II and III Moreover, the rafting routes offered on this river are open to those aged 5 to 65 years. On the banks of the Ayung River, Chicco Tatriele and his wife set up a centre, built entirely of bamboo, dedicated solely to healing the body and mind.

== See also ==
- Spring (hydrology)
- List of drainage basins of Indonesia
- List of rivers of Bali
- List of rivers of Indonesia
- Water cycle
