= Noel Besi River =

River in Indonesia

Coordinates: 9.3260°S 124.0794°E

Noel Besi Rever Noil Besi, Noe Besi, River Besi
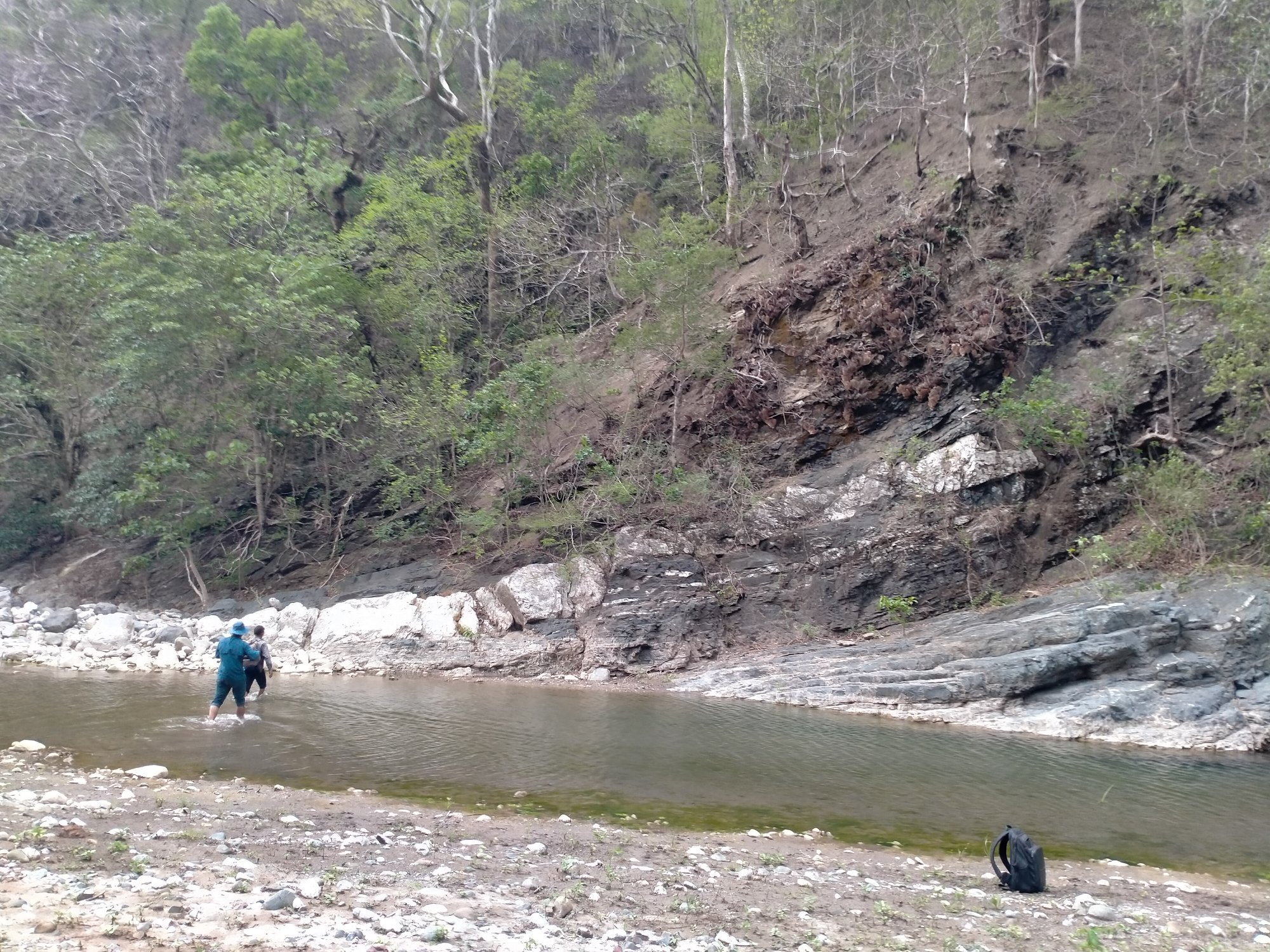

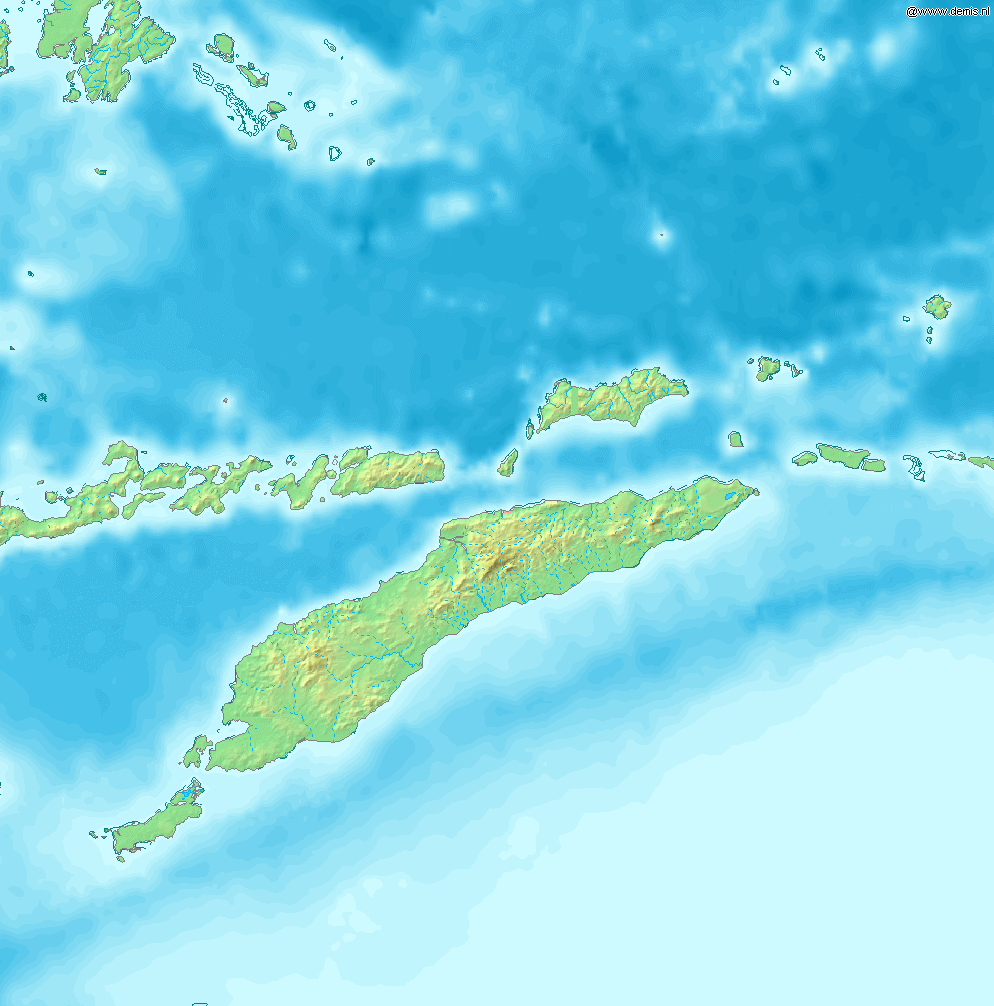
- Location of river mouth

Location
- Countries: Indonesia; Timor-Leste
- Province: East Nusa Tenggara
- Region: Oecussi

Physical characteristics
- Source
  - location: West Timor, Indonesia
  - elevation: 820 m (2,690 ft)
- Mouth: Sawu Sea
  - location: North of Oehoso, Indonesia; Timor-Leste
  - elevation: 5 m (16 ft)

The Noel Besi River is a river flowing in the west part of Timor island and forms part of the border between the Timor-Leste exclave of Oecussi and Indonesian West Timor. It flows north into the Sawu Sea. Located 1900 km east of the Indonesian capital, Jakarta.

== Hydrology ==
The river rises in the mountains of West Timor as Oelvab. It is formed from several tributaries, the longest and southernmost rises to about 820 m in height. After the merging of the tributaries, the river winds north through the mountains. Below the Kali Aplal the Oelvab continues to flow towards the northeast, where after a few kilometers it merges with two other rivers. As soon as it reaches the East Timorese Suco Malelat, it forms the border between Indonesia and Timor-Leste.

From Suco Malelat, the river now called Rio Kusi flows in northwest direction along the border of the Sucos Banafi and Lela-Ufe, before reaching the Suco Usi-Taco. The river bends sharply to southwest and flows along the border of Suco Beneufe. Just south of the village Lamasi it bends again to the northwest. The river now widens, forming river islands and tributaries. Just south of the village Naktuka the river splits. While the left arm, forming several lakes, flows further northwest to Sawu Sea, the right arm bends to the northeast. Both arms are crossed by the northern coastal road, with two bridges over the right arm. This arm flows between Oehoso and Manan on the right side and Naktuka on the left, forming more river islands and several tributaries, and also flows into the Sawu Sea a little later

== Catchment ==
The catchment of the Noel Besi River is one of the 18 largest catchments in Timor-Leste, but is not in the top 10. The portion located within Timor-Leste is 338 km^{2} (131 sq mi) in area, and 60% of the catchment (ie another 507 km^{2} (196 sq mi)) is situated in Indonesia.

Timor-Leste has been broadly divided into twelve 'hydrologic units', groupings of climatologically and physiographically similar and adjacent river catchments. The Noel Besi River catchment is one of the two major catchments in the Lifau & Tono Besi hydrologic unit, which is about 837 km^{2} (323 sq mi) in total area, and covers 5.5% of the country; the other one is the Tono River catchment.

== Geography ==
Noel Besi River

Climate chart (precipitation, max. and min. temperature)
J	F	M	A	M	J	J	A	S	O	N	D
331 25 21	305 24 21	238 24 21	106 26 21	116 26 21	78 26 20	26 28 20	7 30 20	8 33 21	28 33 22	102 30 22	276 26 22
- █ Average max. and min. temperatures in °C
- █ Precipitation totals in mm
Imperial conversion
J	F	M	A	M	J	J	A	S	O	N	D
13 77 70	12 75 70	9.4 75 70	4.2 79 70	4.6 79 70	3.1 79 68	1 82 68	0.3 86 68	0.3 91 70	1.1 91 72	4 86 72	11 79 72
- █ Average max. and min. temperatures in °F
- █ Precipitation totals in inches

The river flows in the northwest part of Timor with predominantly tropical savanna climate (designated as Aw in the Köppen-Geiger climate classification). The annual average temperature in the area is 24 °C. The warmest month is October, when the average temperature is around 28 °C, and the coldest is February, at 22 °C. The average annual rainfall is 1621 mm. The wettest month is January, with an average of 331 mm rainfall, and the driest is August, with 7 mm rainfall.

== Border ==
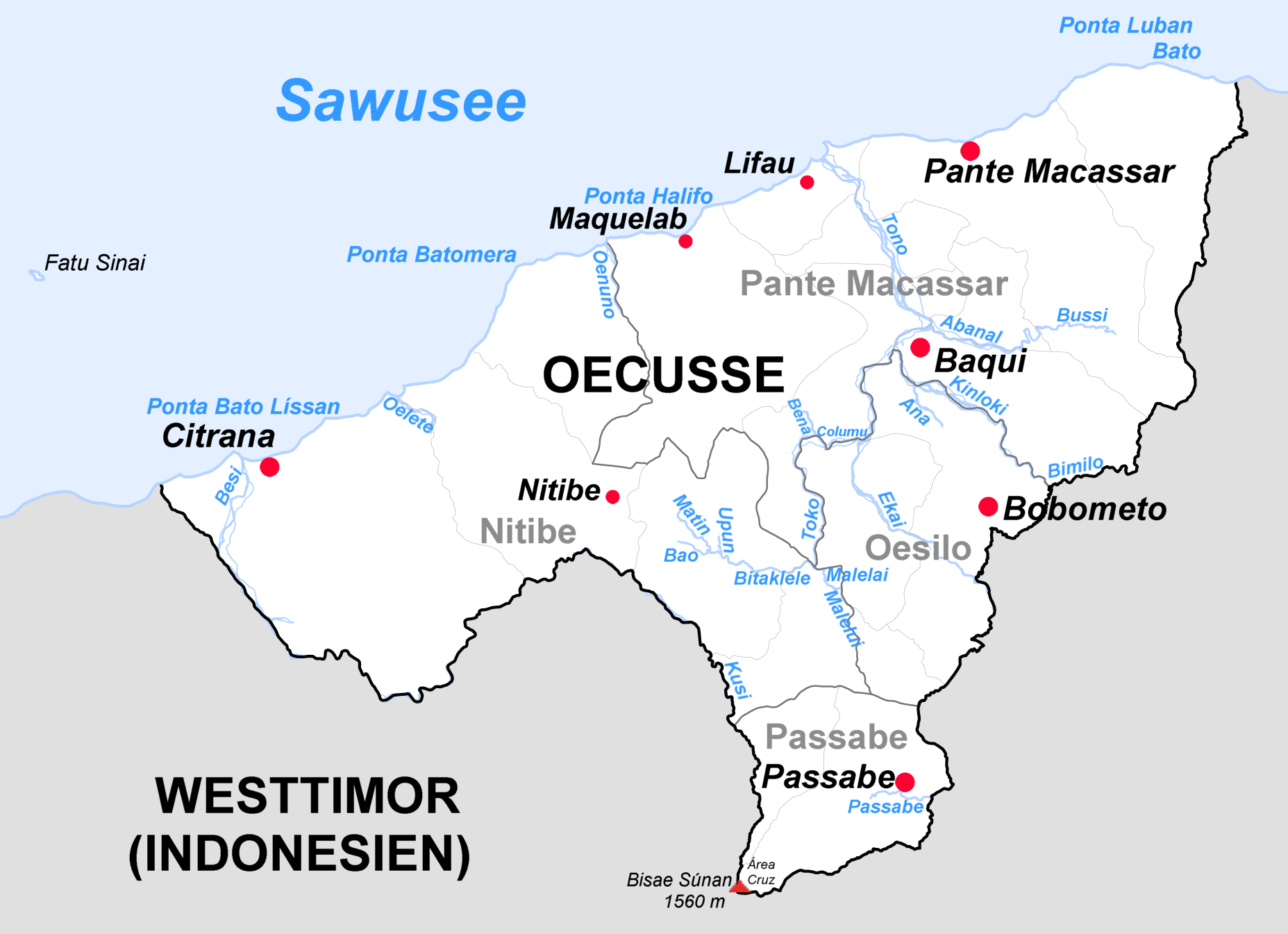
Map of Oecusse-Ambeno, with the "Noel Besi-Citrana border" on the left side.

The Noel Besi forms the "Noel Besi-Citrana border" area between Kupang Regency, East Nusa Tenggara (part of Indonesia), and Oecusse municipality and Special Administrative Region, which belongs to Timor-Leste. This area is watered Noel Besi river which discharges into Ombai Strait. In the period of Portuguese colonization, the river flew on the east side of the disputed area, but due to the natural climate change, the river shifted to the right side of the disputed area, which has now become a fertile agricultural heritage land with the current Noel Besi river.

The small village Naktuka is in the eastern part of administrative village Netemnanu, District of Amfoang, Kupang Regency, and located exactly on the border between Indonesia and Timor-Leste. Now the area of 1,069 hectare has a "free zone" status, cannot be entered by population of both country, although historically, Naktuka belonged to Indonesia, according to the agreement between Portugal and the Netherlands in 1904. In 2017, 63 families from Timor-Leste occupied Naktuka, with immigration office, church, electric network and meeting place of the Oecusse people.

Originally the border between Amfoang and Timor-Leste was the Noel Besi, but now the Timor-Leste people has crossed the border up to 3 km until the stream of Nonomna. One metre from the stream is the Indonesian army outpost. This stream is claimed by Timor-Leste as the border between Indonesia and Timor-Leste. Indonesia wants the Noel Besi as its area according to toponym, whereas Timor-Leste wants the Nono Nomna River based on compass azimuth.

== See also ==
- List of rivers of Timor-Leste
