= Benanain River =

River in Indonesia

Coordinates: 9°40′S 124°56′E

Benanain River Mota Benenain, Mota Benain, Benoin River, Sungai Benain, Noil Benain, Benain River
- Location of river mouth

Location
- Country: Indonesia

Physical characteristics
- Source: Mount Mutis
  - elevation: 2,400 m (7,900 ft)
- Mouth: Timor Sea
  - location: Malaka
- Length: 132 km (82 mi)
- Basin size: 3,158 km^{2} (1,219 sq mi)

The Benanain River is a river of western Timor, Indonesia. This river is the longest and the largest in the West Timor area, with a length of 132 km. The river is located in three regencies: Malaka, Timor Tengah Utara and Timor Tengah Selatan, all in the province of East Nusa Tenggara, Indonesia. The stream rises from Mount Mutis, flowing in a southeast direction before discharging into the Timor Sea near Besikama.

== Hydrology ==
The watershed (Indonesian: Daerah Aliran Sungai/DAS) of Benanain has an area of 3,158 km^{2} comprising most of Malaka, Timor Tengah Utara and Timor Tengah Selatan Regencies, and also a small part of Belu Regency. It has the largest watershed in the East Nusa Tenggara province. The Benanain River has a characteristic of very extreme discharge fluctuation, giving the indication that the condition of this watershed is in a serious damage. Consequently, every year this river causes much flooding.

=== Tributaries ===
Some of the largest tributaries of the river are:

1. Baen River
2. Biau River
3. Asban River
4. Okan River
5. Muti River
6. Bunu River
7. Fatu River
8. Laku River
9. Besi River

== Geography ==
The river flows in the middle south of Timor with predominantly tropical savanna climate (designated as Aw in the Köppen-Geiger climate classification). The annual average temperature in the area is 26 °C. The warmest month is November, when the average temperature is around 29 °C, and the coldest is June, at 23 °C. The average annual rainfall is 1760 mm. The wettest month is January, with an average of 305 mm rainfall, and the driest is September, with 5 mm rainfall.

== Uses ==
The inhabitants along the Benanain River use the water for agriculture and fisheries by traditional fishing or using nets. The Benanain Dam in Kakaniuk village, district of Malaka Tengah, Malaka Regency, can distribute water to 15,000 hectare of farmlands. Other than agriculture, the dam is also used for flood prevention.

== Ecology ==
This river is a habitat of local crocodiles.

== See also ==
- List of drainage basins of Indonesia
- List of rivers of Indonesia
