= Savu Sea =

Small sea within Indonesia

- Sawu Sea
- Laut Sawu (Indonesian); Mar de Savu (Portuguese); Tasi Savu (Tetun)
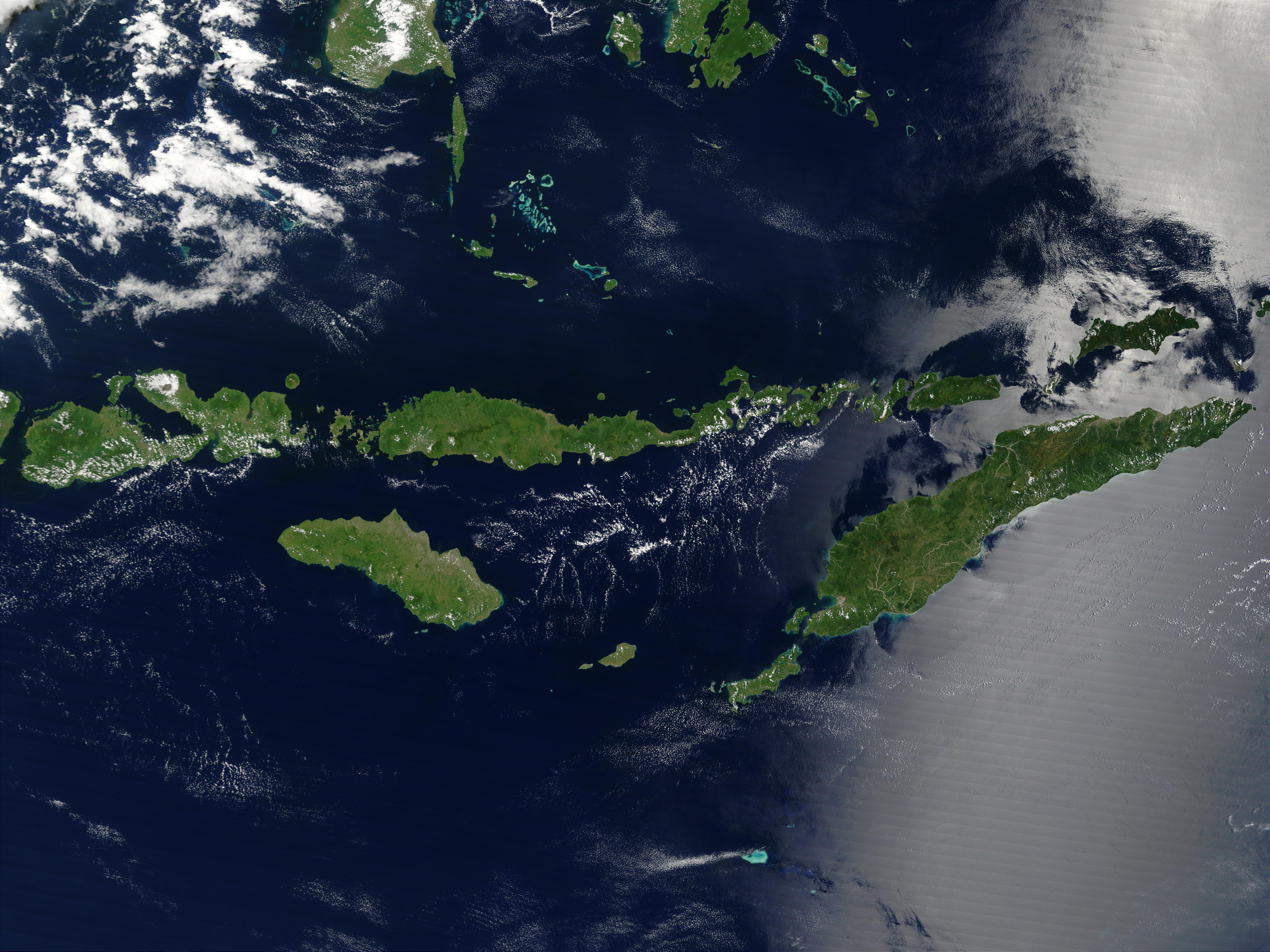
- Satellite image of the Lesser Sunda Islands, with the Savu Sea in the centre
- Interactive map of Savu Sea
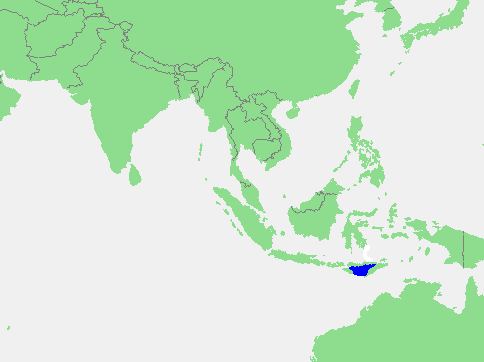
- Location of Savu Sea within Southeast Asia
- Location: Southeast Asia
- Coordinates: 9°45′S 122°00′E
- Type: Sea
- Etymology: Savu Island
- Part of: Indian Ocean
- Basin countries: Indonesia; East Timor
- Max. length: 680 km (420 mi)
- Max. width: 270 km (170 mi)
- Surface area: 105,000 km^{2} (41,000 sq mi)
- Average depth: 1,700 m (5,600 ft)
- Water volume: 178,000 km^{3} (43,000 cu mi)
- Settlements: Ende; Kupang; Waingapu

The Savu or Sawu Sea (Indonesian: Laut Sawu, Portuguese: Mar de Savu, Tetun: Tasi Savu) is a sea within Indonesia named for the island of Savu (Sawu) on its southern boundary. It is an important habitat and migratory corridor for cetaceans, turtles and marine mammals. Savu Sea National Marine Park (official name: Kawasan Konservasi Perairan Nasional Laut Sawu dan sekitarnya di Provinsi Nusa Tenggara Timur) was established in 2014.

== Description ==
The International Hydrographic Organization (IHO) defines the Savu Sea as being one of the waters of the East Indian Archipelago and defines its limits as follows:

On the North. By the Southern limits of Flores Sea [The North coasts of Flores, Komodo, Banta and a line to Tanjong Naroe the Northeast point of Soembawa, thence along its North coast to Tanjong Sarokaja (8°22′S 117°10′E)] and Banda Sea [125° East ... [on] Alor Island, thence round the East point and along the North coasts of the Alor, Pantar, Lomblen and Adoenara Islands and thence across the Northern end of Flores Stait to Tanjong Serbete the Eastern extreme of Flores].

On the East. By the meridian of 125° East between Alor and Timor.

On the South. By a line from the Southwest point of Timor to the Northeast point of Roti, through this island to its Southwest point, thence a line to Poeloe Dana (10°49′S 121°17′E) and to Tanjong Ngoendjoe, the Southern extreme of Soemba and through this island to Tanjong Karosso, its Western point.

On the West. A line from Tanjong Karosso (Soemba) to Toro Doro (8°53′S 118°30′E) on the South coast of Soembawa.

It is bounded by the islands of Savu to the south, Timor to the east, Flores to the north and Sumba to the west. Its area is about 105,000 km^{2} (41,000 sq mi) and its mean depth is 1,700 metres (5,600 ft). Its deep-sea trench reaches depths of over 6,500 feet (2,000 m).

== Marine life and conservation ==
The Savu Sea Marine National Park, established in 2014, is home to over 500 coral species, 10 of Indonesia's 13 seagrass species and 8 mangrove species. It covers 35,000 km^{2}. The Terumbu Karang Sehat Indonesia programme implemented by Konservasi Indonesia includes activities in the Savu Sea Marine National Park off East Sumba.

Its deep-sea trench is a migration corridor for sea turtles and 14 species of whales, including the blue whale and the pygmy blue whale, between northwestern Australia and the Banda and Seram Seas.

Other animals observed here include:

- Fraser's dolphins
- Indo-Pacific bottlenose dolphins
- spinner dolphins
- melon-headed whales
- sperm whales

All marine mammals have been protected by the Indonesian government since 1999.
