= Sumba people =

Ethnic group of Sumba Island, Indonesia

Sumba people Marapu people / Sumbanese people
Tau Humba
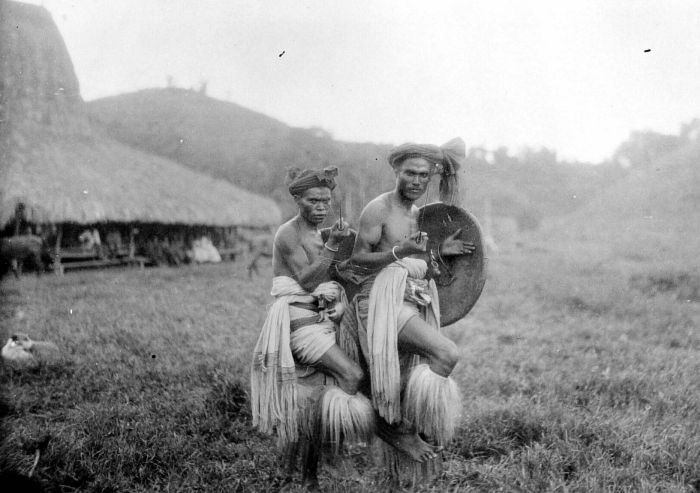
- Two men dancing with sword and shield, Sumba Island, 1930.

Total population
- Approximately 656,000 (2008)

Regions with significant populations
- Indonesia (West Sumba Regency & East Sumba Regency, Sumba Island)

Languages
- Sumba languages, Indonesian

Religion
- Christianity: 64% (¾ Protestantism, ¼ Catholicism) (predominantly), Islam: 6%, Marapu religion: 30%

Related ethnic groups
- Savu people, Bimanese people, other Melanesians and Austronesian peoples

The Sumba (or Sumbanese) people are an Austronesian ethnic group inhabiting Sumba Island in Indonesia, which is divided by four regencies, namely the Southwest Sumba Regency, West Sumba Regency, Central Sumba Regency, and the East Sumba Regency. They refer to themselves as Tau Humba. The Sumbese have been able to retain much of their culture despite foreign influences that arrived long ago on the Lesser Sunda Islands.

== Origin ==
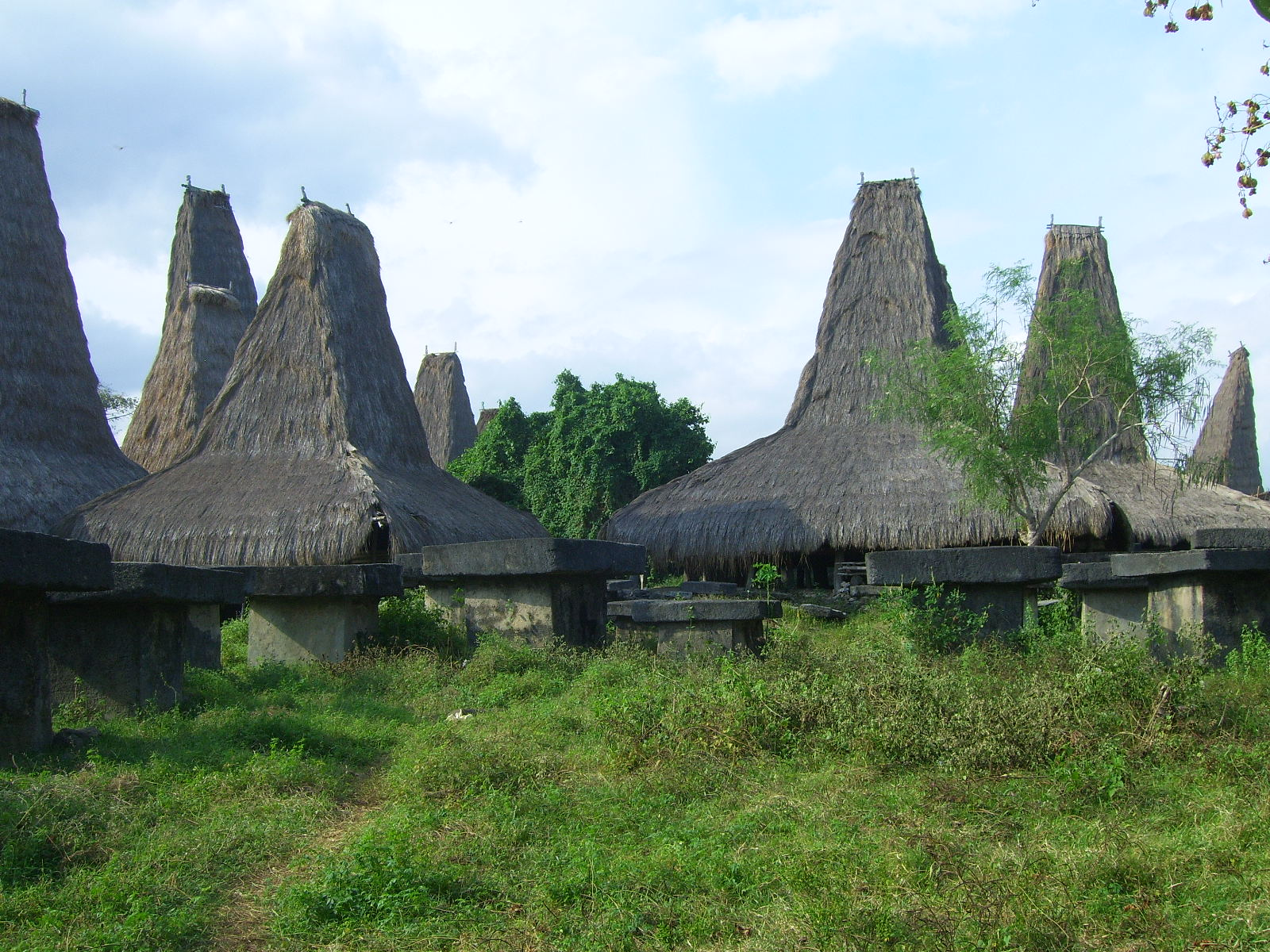
Traditional Sumbanese houses near Bondokodi, West Sumba Regency, Indonesia.

=== Mythology ===
There are genealogical bonds between the Sumba and those of the Sawu Island. According to a myth of origin, they come from two ancestors, Hawu Meha and Humba Meha. Hawu Meha gave birth to the Sawunese who initially lived in Sumba Island but later migrated to the small Sawu Island. The offspring of Humba Meha remained in Sumba.

== History ==
The exact time Sumba Island began to populate is not known. There were theories that Sumba Island's most ancient inhabitants of the Australoids later assimilated with the Austronesian people. Proof of this was the appearance of the natives Sumba, which had some Australoid features. However, genetic studies have shown that Sumba people are a little different from other Austronesian people and the Australoid features could have been taken by their ancestors on the way to the island.

According to the Marapu mythology, the first people came down through the stairs from the sky to the north of the island. Geneticists claim that the ancestors of the Sumba people really did originally inhabit the northern coast, and only then followed by the rest of the Sumba Island. Since the end of Neolithic period, settlers have created megalithic structures. Moreover, this tradition continued until the 20th century.

In the Middle Ages, Sumba were active in trading valuable species of wood and fragrant resin. Due to the merchants from Arabia to the island, new breed of horses were introduced. The dry climate of the local Tropical savanna climate contributed to the expansion of horse breeding. It is assumed that Sumba people were dependent on the Javanese kingdom of Majapahit, then from other kingdom relations in Sumbawa and Sulawesi. In fact, the power was divided among the local leaders, with their never-ending struggle for power. This has resulted in the development of slavery.

In 1866, Sumba was attached to the colonial possessions of the Dutch East India Company. East of the island was greatly influenced by the colonial administration, while the west side maintained an archaic lifestyle. After an uprising in 1901, the Dutch had a number of reforms aimed at modernizing the economy and the establishment of a single administration.

In 1949, Sumba became part of independent Indonesia.

== Religion ==
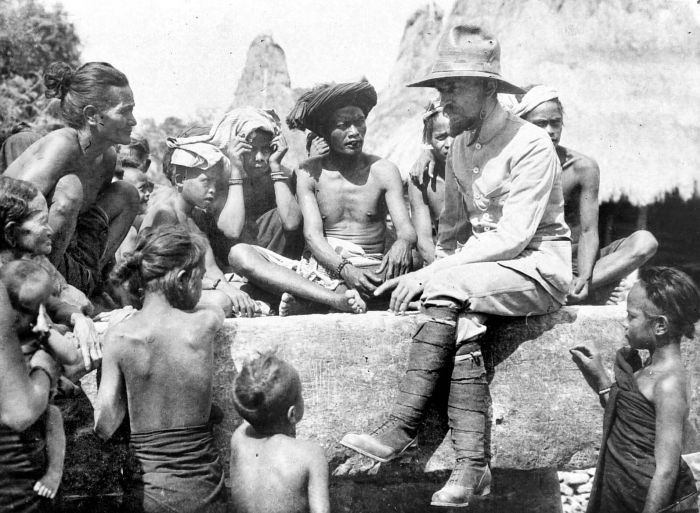
A Protestant missionary minister, Wiebe van Dijk sitting on a Sumba tomb, preaching the Gospel to the people of Sumba, circa 1925–1929.

The traditional religion of the Marapu religion, which includes both ancestral worship and deity worship is still very much alive among the Sumba society. Marapu is the philosophical center of Sumba cultural expression and includes customary ceremonies, traditional places of worship (umaratu), traditional architecture, decorative carvings and textiles with its fashion styles such as hinggi and lau fabric, as well as its jewelry and weapons. Christianity begin to spread in the 19th century with the arrival of Christian missionaries. The majority of Christian believers belong to the Protestants.

== Culture ==
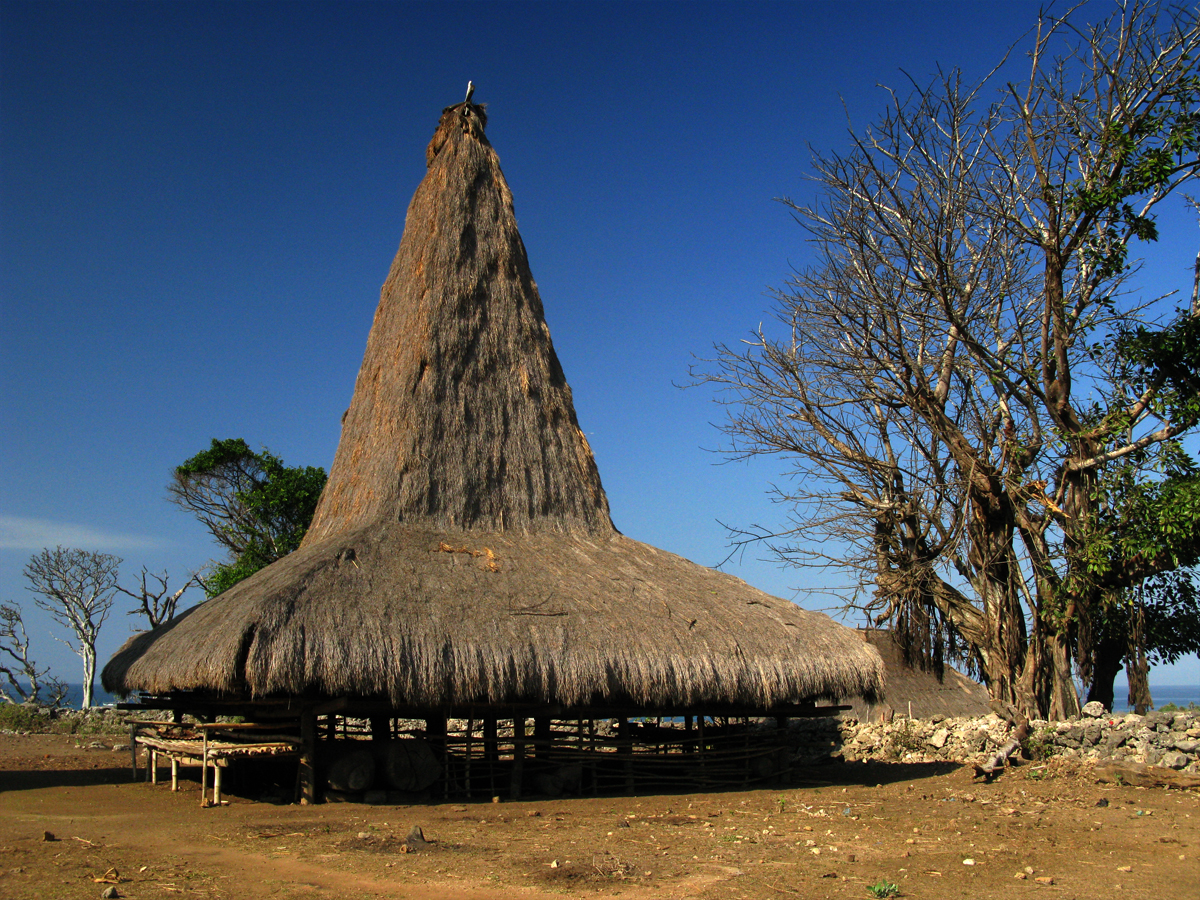
A traditional Sumba house in Ratenggaro village, West Sumba, Indonesia.

The main occupation of Sumba people has long been agriculture. Dominated by slash-and-burn agriculture in the Tropical savanna climate, as well as livestock keeping. The climate with regular seasonal droughts have led to the formation of a special agricultural strategy where farmers simultaneously grow various crops at subsistence level such as rice, beans, tuber, corn, and so on. However, even today it is not always bountiful but it helps to produce just good enough harvests. The traditional staple diet are rice and cassava. Dutch missionaries and colonial officers have noted that hunger is often a cause for military conflicts. Sumba people also keep cows, buffalo, chickens, sheep and horses. The locals breed a species of small but hardy horses, and it is also well known to other islands of Indonesia. Traditional crafts includes weaving and stone carving.

The main type of settlement is village houses with their traditional defensive concept is to be built on hilltops and surrounded by dense thorny thickets. Frame bamboo huts are built on poles with walls overshadowing mats. Thatched roof has a complex structure designed to protect homes from rain and sun, as well as to provide natural ventilation in buildings.

The social strata in East Sumba Regency among the nobles (maramba), priests (kabisu) and the common folk (ata) still exists although it is not observed as strictly as in the past and outwardly it is no longer obviously seen in the physical appearance and the dress of a person. Today differences in attire indicate different levels of importance during events such as traditional celebrations, weddings and death ceremonies, where components of the attire that is used are newly made, while old or worn out clothing is usually used at home or for daily work.

In the past, the main clothing was ornamented sarong ikat, where both men and women covered them only at the lower part of the body. The most important part of the traditional attire of Sumba is located on the body cover in the form of large sheets of hinggi fabric for men and lau fabric for women. From the hinggi and lau fabrics which is made by weaving techniques and its application of muti and hada are revealed as various symbols in the social and economic context.

Historically, the eastern part of the island of Sumba is the hub of trade relations where people are connected with the outside world. Therefore in the second half of 2 millennium AD, complex social structure are formed here with a layer of high ranking soldiers and leaders that took the monarch title, raja. In western Sumba, only a small tribal groups are headed by selected leaders remained. In both parts of the island's main social role played by the major tribal communities, who occupied the village, controls the surrounding land and water sources. They were divided into small nuclear groups and large extended families. Kinship and inheritance are only counted on the patrilineal line.

Sumba people have a rich and relatively diverse oral folklore. Preserved traditional festivals, which includes horse race, bull sacrifices, complex funerary rituals and fights with spears. Pasola is the cultural feast of the Sumba people and is considered one of Indonesia's cultural richness, which is very rare and unique to the Sumba people. In West Sumba Regency, people come from far away just to watch the pasola, a competition whereby two teams compete in throwing blunted spears at each other. By the 20th century, Sumba people have already built megalithic tombs, most famously in Anakalang.

=== Traditional men's attire ===
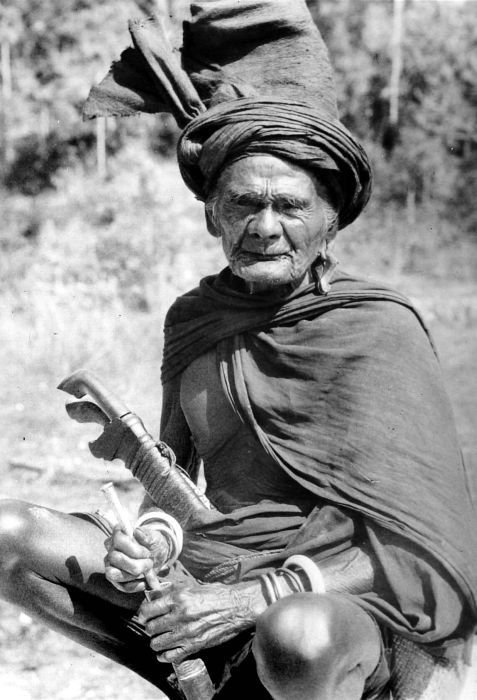
A Rato/Ratu Merapu (Marapu ritual specialist) in a traditional attire, complete with a Kabeala is seen preparing his sirih pipe, 1943.

As mentioned previously, the attire of the adult Sumba community tend to be based on the level of importance as well as the circle of environment in an event rather than hierarchical social status. However, there are some minor differences. For example, the attire of an aristocratic is usually made of finer cloth and accessories compared to a commoner, although the components and overall appearance are the same. By observing those aspects, the study of Sumba men's clothing are focused on traditional attires worn in huge events, ceremonies, festivals and of the sorts. It is because in occasions as such, men will dress in their best outlook. Sumba men's attire are consist of a headgear, body coverings and a number of accompanying embellishments and bladed weapon.

As for the covering of the body, two pieces of hinggi are used, namely hinggi kombu and hinggi kaworu. Hinggi kombu is worn on the hip and reinforced with a wide leather belt. Hinggi kaworu or sometimes hinggi raukadama is used as a complementary. Tiara patang is tied around the head, a type of headgear with certain loops and knots that displays a crest shape. This crest can be placed in front, on the left side or on the right side depending on the symbolic meaning that is intended. For example, a crest placed in front symbolizes wisdom and independence. The hinggi and tiara are made of woven cloth of ikat technique and pahikung technique. Especially headgear that is made with the pahikung weaving technique is called tiara pahudu.

A variety of decorations that are found on the hinggi and tiara especially those that related to living creature such as human abstract (skull), prawns, chicken, snake, dragon, crocodile, horse, fish, turtle, squid, deer, bird, buffalo and patterns that are influence by foreign cultures (Chinese and Dutch) such as dragon, three colored flag, crown and lion. All of them have their own meaning and symbol that derives from mythology, mind, as well as deep believe in Marapu. The color of the hinggi also reflects aesthetic value and social status. The best hinggi is hinggi kombu followed by hinggi kawaru, then hinggi raukadana and finally hinggi panda paingu.

Next, Sumba men's attire is completed with a Kabeala inserted of the left side of the belt. While a kanatar (bracelet) and a mutisalak (coral beads) is worn on the left wrist. Traditionally there is no footwear in the men's attire, however it is commonly used especially those in the city. The Kabeala is a symbol of masculinity. The mutisalak symbolizes economically-able and social ranking. Similarly as it is with other embellishments. Overall, the decorations and complementary embellishments of the attire is a symbol of wisdom, strength and kindness of a person.

Heirloom objects such as the marangga neck circle-pectoral and the gold jewelry madaka are also worn during special ceremony, although these objects are normally kept inside the attic of the house due to their supposed strong spiritual power.

=== Traditional women's attire ===
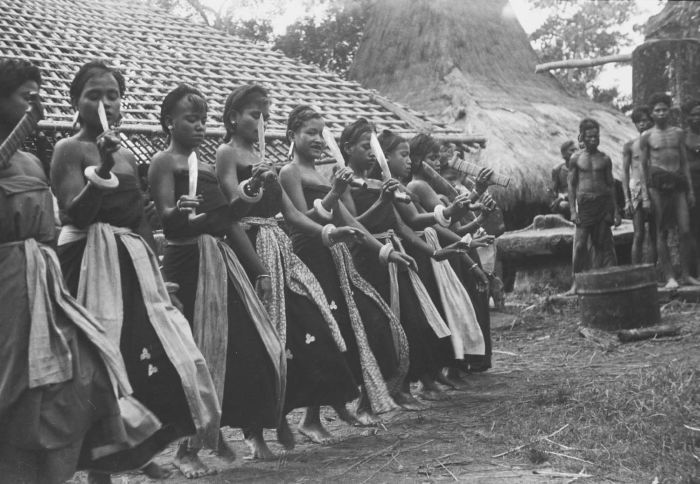
Sumbese women holding Kahidi Yutu knife while dancing to celebrate the construction of a new home, 1949.

Festivals and ceremonial female attires of the Eastern Sumbese always involves a choice of several fabrics which are named according to style of the weaving techniques such as lau kaworu, lau pahudu, lau lau mutikau and pahudu kiku. Decorative fabrics are used as lower part of the sarong covering up to the chest (lau pahudu kiku) and shoulders covered (taba huku) with the same color as the sarong. The head dress is decorated with plain-colored tiara that comes with hiduhai or hai kara. Above the forehead is pinned with metal jewelry such as gold or gilding which called Marangga. While the ear are decorated with mamuli jewelry in the form of golden necklaces are also used on the neck and dangles right up to the chest. As the men carries the Kabeala, the women carries the Kahidi Yutu knife when leaving one's residence or when attending formal occasions.

== See also ==
- Anakalang
- Textiles of Sumba
