= Lede Kalumbang Airport =

Lede Kalumbang Airport Bandar Udara Lede Kalumbang
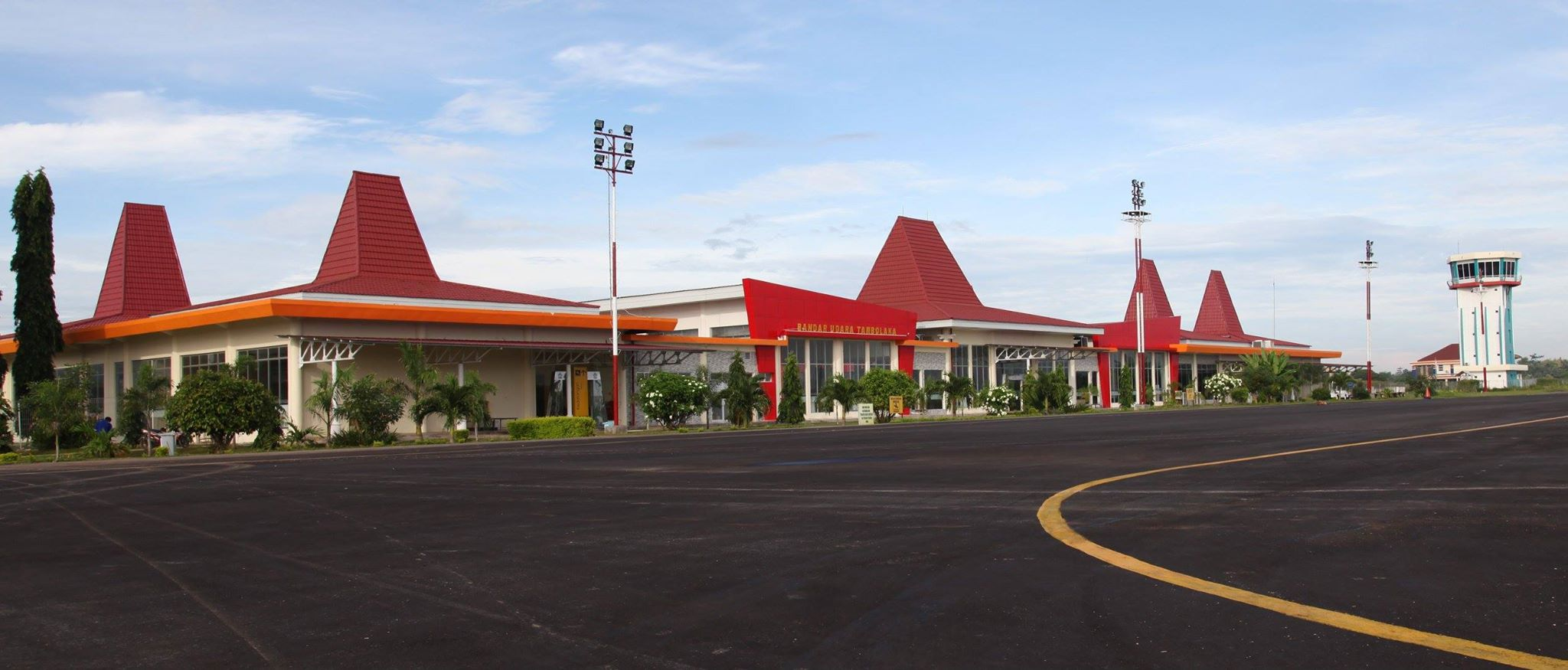
- IATA: TMC; ICAO: WATK

Summary
- Airport type: Public
- Owner: Government of Indonesia
- Operator: Directorate General of Civil Aviation
- Serves: Tambolaka
- Location: Tambolaka, Southwest Sumba Regency, East Nusa Tenggara, Indonesia
- Time zone: WITA (UTC+08:00)
- Elevation AMSL: 47.85 m (157.0 ft)
- Coordinates: 09°24′34.98″S 119°14′40.18″E

Map
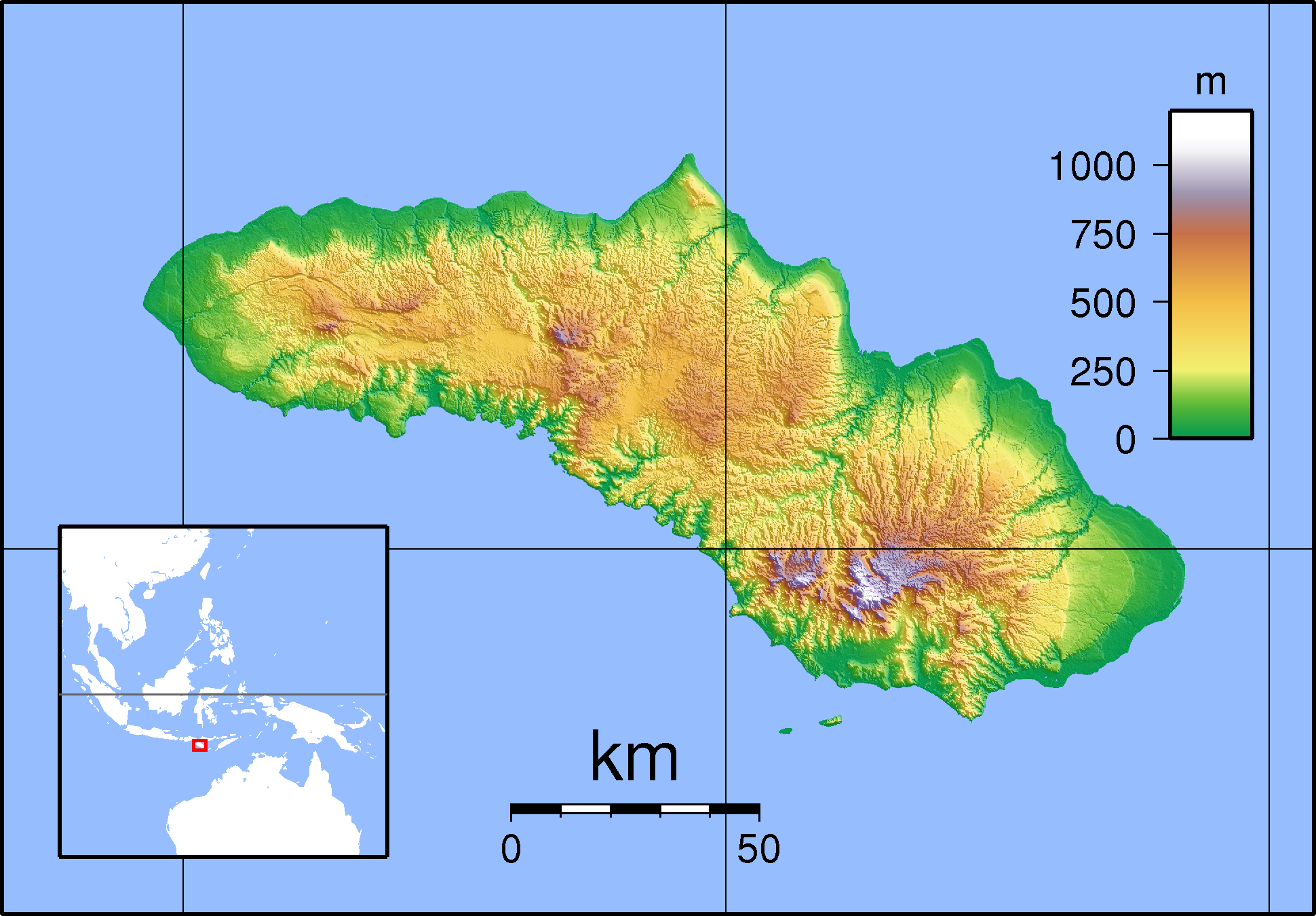
- Location of airport in Sumba Island

Runways
| Direction | Length | | Surface |
| Direction | m | ft | Surface |
|---|---|---|---|
| 10/28 | 2,300 | 7,546 | Asphalt |

Statistics (2024)
- Passengers: 165,416 (▼5.28%)
- Cargo (tonnes): 430.85 (▼14.58%)
- Aircraft movements: 2,445 (▼24.63%)
- Source: DGCA

Lede Kalumbang Airport (IATA: TMC, ICAO: WATK), formerly Tambolaka Airport, is a domestic airport serving the town of Tambolaka, the capital of Southwest Sumba Regency on Sumba Island, East Nusa Tenggara, Indonesia. The airport is named after Leonardus Lede Kalumbang, the first regent of West Sumba Regency, the administrative area where the airport was located before the establishment of Southwest Sumba Regency in 2007. Located about 5 km (3.1 mi) from the town center, it is one of only two airports on the island of Sumba—the other being Umbu Mehang Kunda Airport in Waingapu—and serves as the main gateway to western Sumba. The airport is currently connected with several major cities such as Denpasar, Kupang and Surabaya.

== History ==
Lede Kalumbang Airport was originally constructed by Japanese forces in 1945, during their occupation of the Dutch East Indies in the final stages of the Pacific Theater of World War II. At the time, the facility was known as Tambolaka Airport. It was built to serve both as a defensive outpost for Sumba and as a strategic military base, supporting Japan’s logistical and operational needs in the region as part of its wider defensive network against the advancing Allied forces. Following the end of the war and Indonesia’s declaration of independence, control of the airport was handed over to the newly established Indonesian authorities.

The airport underwent major improvements in 1982, including the asphalting and repair of its runway to accommodate small aircraft such as the Douglas DC-3, Twin Otter, and CASA. In 1996, the runway was further extended to allow Fokker 27 operations. Another round of strengthening and extension was carried out in 2005, bringing the runway length to 1,600 meters, making it capable of handling Fokker 28 aircraft. It was later extended again to 1,800 meters to accommodate Fokker 100 aircraft. By 2015, the runway of Tambolaka Airport had reached a total length of 2,300 × 45 meters (7,546 × 148 ft), enabling it to serve narrow-body aircraft such as the Airbus A320 and Boeing 737.

On 7 November 2022, Tambolaka Airport was officially renamed Lede Kalumbang Airport in honor of Leonardus Lede Kalumbang, the first regent of West Sumba Regency, elected in 1958. He played a significant role in the development of Sumba in the years following Indonesia’s independence.

To accommodate the growing number of foreign tourists visiting Sumba, proposals have been made to upgrade the airport’s status to an international airport, enabling it to handle direct international flights. However, as of 2025, this plan has not yet been realized.

== Facilities and development ==
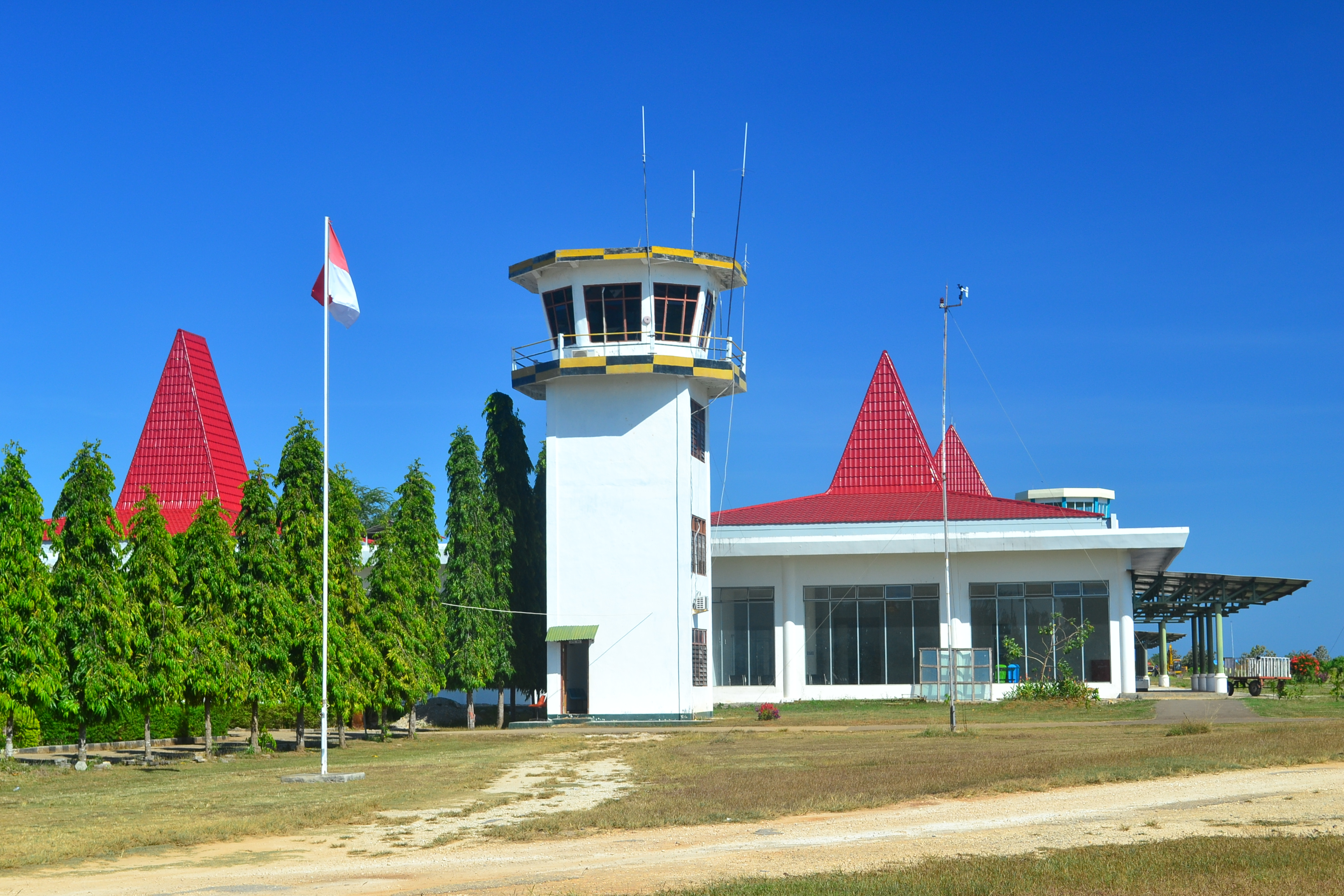
Former ATC tower

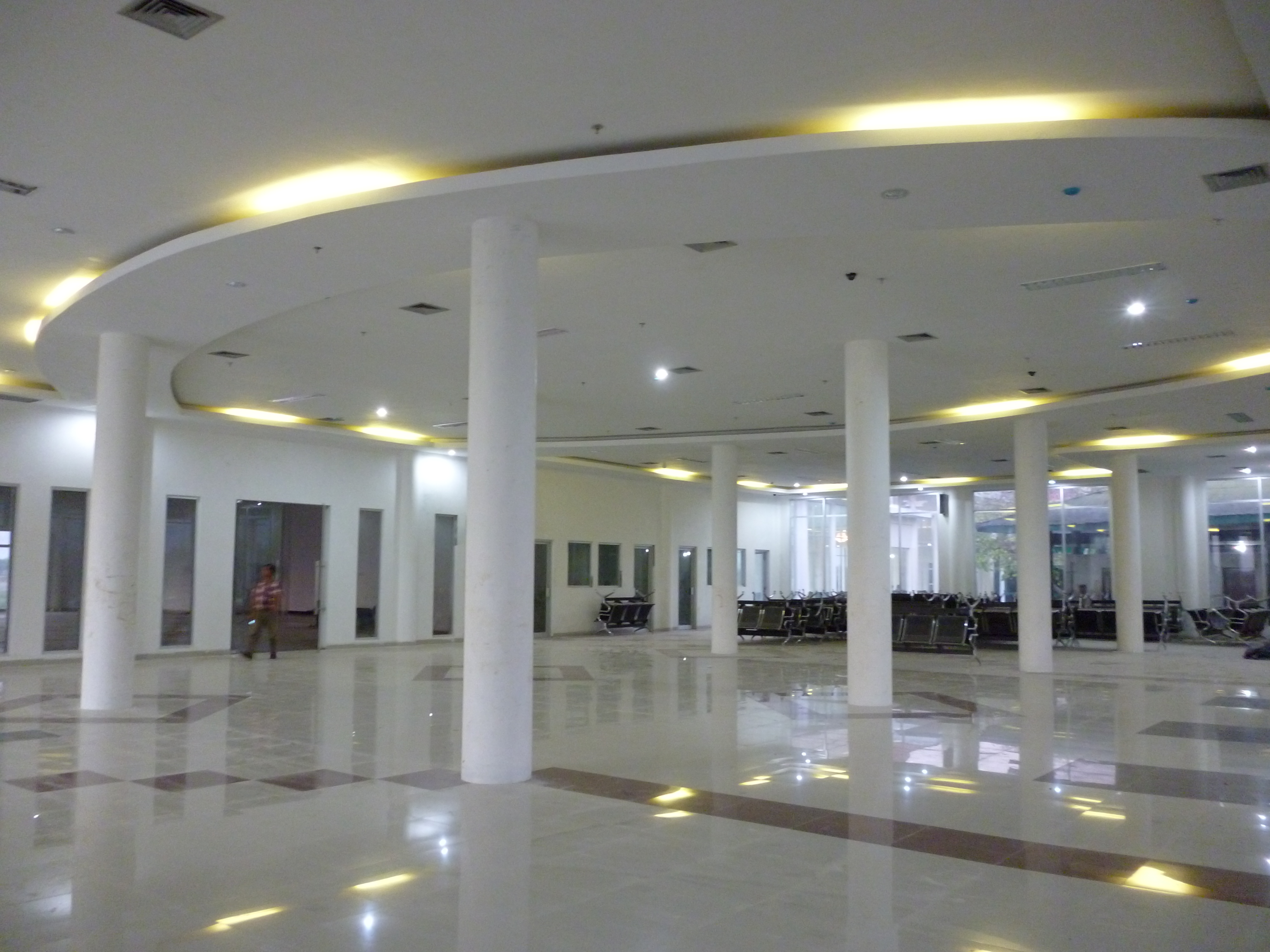
Check-in area

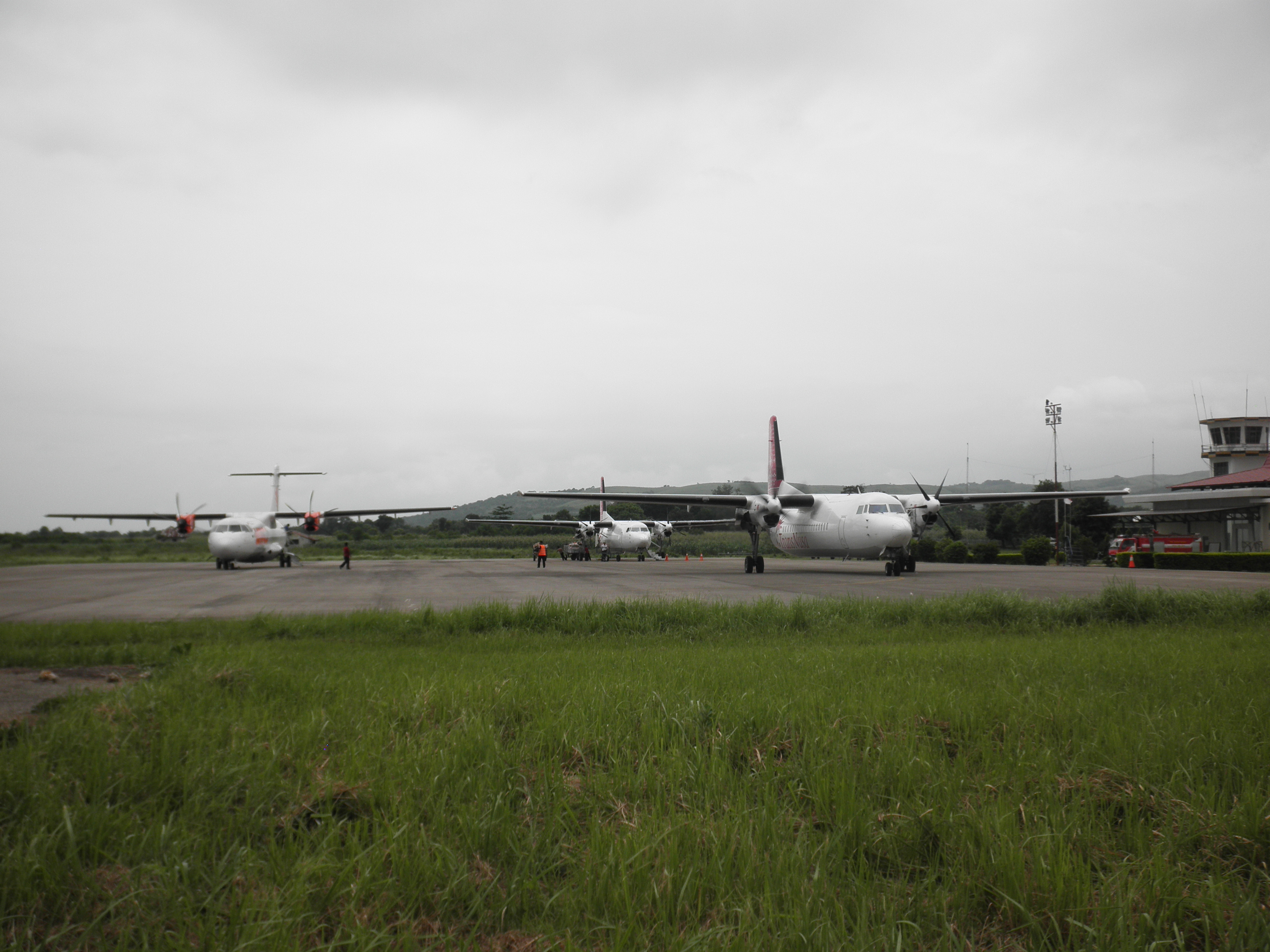
Aircraft lined up on the apron

The airport features a runway measuring 2,300 m × 45 m, capable of accommodating narrow-body aircraft such as the Airbus A320 and Boeing 737. It has a single taxiway, 108 m × 23 m in size, and an apron measuring 269 m × 95 m, which can accommodate up to five aircraft, including Boeing 737-500s and ATR 72s. The terminal covers an area of 5,400 m² and is designed in traditional Sumbanese architecture, characterized by a high-pitched central peak on its roof. The terminal has a capacity of 250 passengers per departure and is adorned with murals showcasing the natural beauty of Sumba, such as Waikuri Lagoon and Kampung Prai Ijing. Outside the public area, there are pillars decorated with traditional Sumba motifs, as well as a statue of Pasola, the mounted warrior of Sumba.

Currently, plans are underway to add an additional taxiway and expand the existing apron to 318 m × 95 m, allowing it to accommodate up to six Airbus A320 aircraft. The passenger terminal, which is already operating over capacity, will also be enlarged to handle the growing number of travelers. All of these projects are scheduled to commence in 2027. There are also plans to extend the runway to 2,500 m in the future, although no specific timeline has been set.

== Airlines and destinations ==
| Airlines | Destinations |
|---|---|
| Batik Air | Denpasar |
| NAM Air | Denpasar, Kupang, Surabaya |
| Wings Air | Kupang, Labuan Bajo |

== Statistics ==
Annual passenger numbers and aircraft statistics
| Year | Passengers handled | Passenger % change | Cargo (tonnes) | Cargo % change | Aircraft movements | Aircraft % change |
|---|---|---|---|---|---|---|
| 2006 | 30,930 | Steady | 20.80 | Steady | 1,110 | Steady |
| 2007 | 56,704 | ▲83.33 | 69.47 | ▲233.99 | 1,342 | ▲20.90 |
| 2008 | 41,302 | ▼27.16 | 59.77 | ▼13.96 | 922 | ▼31.30 |
| 2009 | 55,253 | ▲33.78 | 146.33 | ▲144.82 | 1,318 | ▲42.95 |
| 2010 | 84,369 | ▲52.70 | 70.31 | ▼51.95 | 1,622 | ▲23.07 |
| 2011 | 84,910 | ▲0.64 | 186.22 | ▲164.86 | 2,634 | ▲62.39 |
| 2012 | 106,341 | ▲25.24 | 226.39 | ▲21.57 | 2,232 | ▼15.26 |
| 2013 | 106,760 | ▲0.39 | 413.77 | ▲82.77 | 2,388 | ▲6.99 |
| 2014 | 124,208 | ▲16.34 | 126.63 | ▼69.40 | 2,658 | ▲11.31 |
| 2015 | 131,873 | ▲6.17 | 194.89 | ▲53.91 | 2,233 | ▼15.99 |
| 2016 | 155,086 | ▲17.60 | 284.36 | ▲45.91 | 2,378 | ▲6.49 |
| 2017 | 189,988 | ▲22.50 | 459.81 | ▲61.70 | 4,105 | ▲72.62 |
| 2018 | 294,984 | ▲55.26 | 495.91 | ▲7.85 | 4,909 | ▲19.59 |
| 2019 | 227,230 | ▼22.97 | 675.30 | ▲36.17 | 3,518 | ▼28.34 |
| 2020 | 150,064 | ▼33.96 | 397.37 | ▼41.16 | 2,695 | ▼23.39 |
| 2021 | 105,522 | ▼29.68 | 490.48 | ▲23.43 | 2,392 | ▼11.24 |
| 2022 | 185,592 | ▲75.88 | 716.67 | ▲46.12 | 3,063 | ▲28.05 |
| 2023 | 174,644 | ▼5.90 | 504.39 | ▼29.62 | 3,244 | ▲5.91 |
| 2024 | 165,416 | ▼5.28 | 430.85 | ▼14.58 | 2,445 | ▼24.63 |
^{Source: DGCA, BPS}

== Accidents and incidents ==
- On February 11, 2006, Adam Air Flight 782, registration number PK-KKE, lost navigational and communications systems twenty minutes into a flight from Jakarta to Makassar, South Sulawesi. The plane was subsequently flown into a radar "black spot" and was lost for several hours, eventually making an emergency landing at Tambolaka Airport, Sumba (on a different island 481 km away from their intended destination, and southeast from their origin, instead of north-east). The pilot was fired and it was found that Adam Air flight violated multiple safety regulations, including removing an aircraft before it was due for inspection by aviation authorities.
