= Marangga =

Type of precious metal

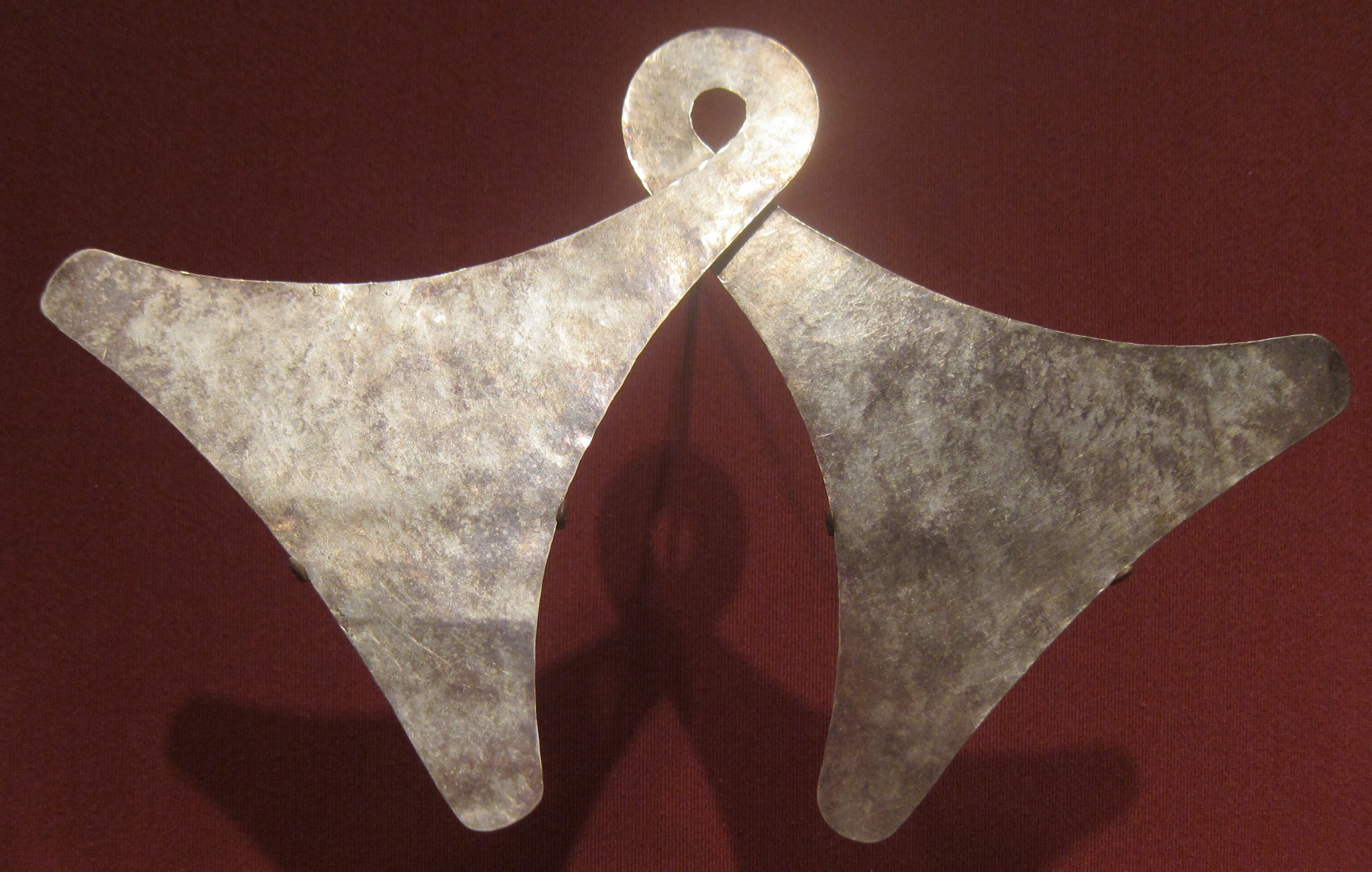
A marangga, precious metal valuable of the Sumba people.

Marangga are precious metal valuable of the Sumba people of Sumba Island, Indonesia. They are found in the megalithic culture of the western Sumba people, e.g. the Anakalang society. They have the shape of a twisted metal sheet with a broadened end that has the shape of an axe. The marangga of Sumba is worn hung to the neck as a pendant, forming a kind of chest plate.

== Form and evolution ==
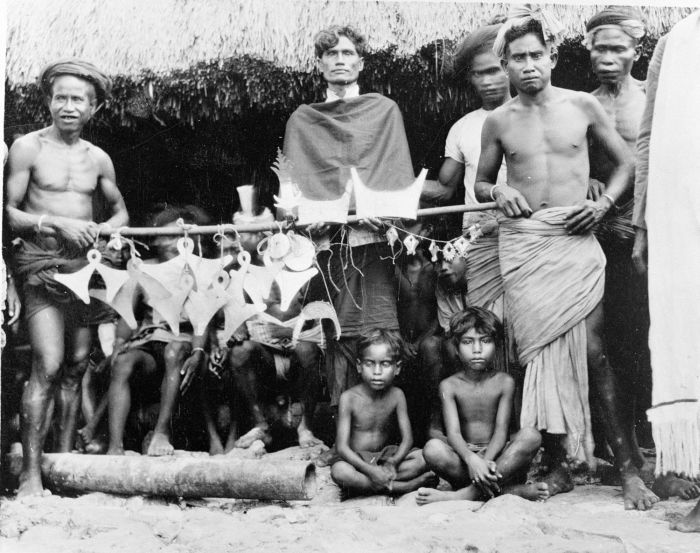
The Anakalang tribe of west Sumba displayed a number of marangga and other Sumba objects e.g. the mamuli. These are valuable objects made of precious metals e.g. gold and silver.

The marangga are archaic objects. Similar marangga-like objects have been discovered in archaeological sites throughout the archipelago of Indonesia. Marangga-like objects were first seen in small pre-classical gold pieces found in Java, dating back to the 4th-6th century. Other marangga-like objects were found in Flores (the taka) and Babar (the kapak). Among these findings, the marangga of Sumba are much larger in size and still heavily used in the rituals of certain megalithic culture in for example the Anakalang society.

Marangga objects usually take the form of a thin metallic sheet shaped like a pair of axes. Marangga can weigh up to 1 kg (2.2 lb) and measures up to 35 cm (14 in) in length. Historic photos of the Anakalang society shows a number of marangga displayed on bamboo frames, indicating the prevalence and the volume of gold objects in Sumba.

== Function ==
The small marangga-like objects that were found throughout the archipelago may function as a twisted-wire earring, whose ends have been beaten flat. The large-sized marangga of Sumba, which are too large and too heavy for earrings, are worn as a pendant, by looping a twine through the hole on the twisted loop of the marangga. It acts as a kind of chest plate for the wearer.

The marangga of Sumba are a kind of heirloom objects that was accumulated by the clan leader through time and kept in the interior most of the time. The marangga are usually kept in the attic of the noble's uma mbatangu or the traditional Sumbanese peaked house. They are taken out into the light only during special ritual occasions, and under the careful control of the village priests. One of the reasons of this is that it was believed that their power could kill onlookers or cause natural disasters.

== See also ==
- Mamuli
- Madaka

== Cited works ==
- Holmgren, Robert J.; Spertus, Anita E. (1989). Early Indonesian Textiles from Three Island Cultures: Sumba, Toraja, Lampung. New York City: Metropolitan Museum of Art. ISBN 9780870995385.
- Richter, Anne; Carpenter, Bruce W. (2012). Gold Jewellery of the Indonesian Archipelago. Editions Didier Millet. ISBN 9789814260381.
- Rodgers, Susan (1988). Power and gold: jewelry from Indonesia, Malaysia, and the Philippines : from the collection of the Barbier-Mueller Museum, Geneva. Prestek-Verlag. ISBN 9783791308593.
