= Madaka =

Type of precious metal

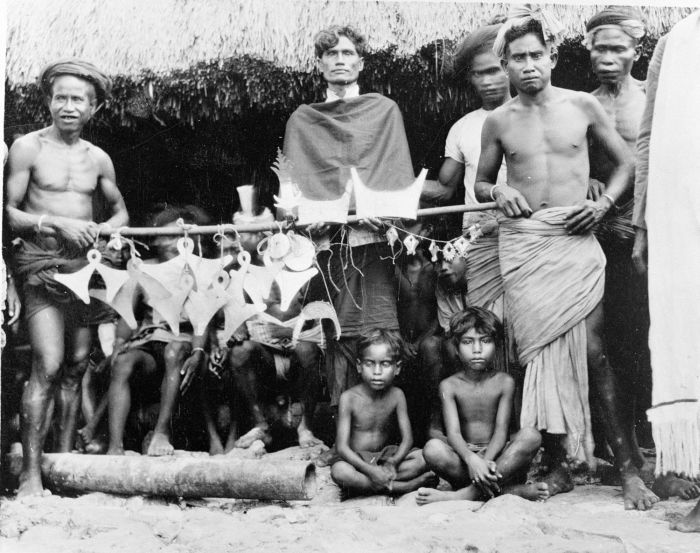
A picture of the Anakalang society of west Sumba showing various heirloom objects, e.g. mamuli, marangga, and madaka. In this photograph, the madaka is the third hung object from the right.

Madaka, also written as mendaka, is a type of precious metal valuable to the Sumba people of Sumba Island, Indonesia. It is found in the megalithic culture of the western Sumba people, e.g. the tribe of Anakalang. Of all precious metal valuable to Sumba people, the madaka is considered to be the most sacred type of gold heirloom.

== Form and evolution ==
Madaka have the shape best described as scalloped lumps. According to some Sumbanese people, the madaka was a stylized naga dragon: the radiating spokes are said to represent the spine of the naga, and the opening its mouth. Anakalang elders explained that the madaka was the most archaic and sacred of all gold heirlooms of Sumba. Some madaka date back five or six centuries. Madaka have been presented by the ancient rulers of Java as tokens of high office.

The shape is a variation of another Sumba ornament called the mamuli, with a row of radiating spokes surrounding a hole and a slit in the middle. In the case of the mamuli, the shape represents female genitalia and symbolizes female sexuality and the ability of women to create life. The archaic omega-shaped form of both mamuli and madaka is also known as "open oval". In the case of the madaka, one of the two finials (which are on each side of the bottom slit) protrudes further than the other. This is comparable with other open oval forms found in the Indonesian archipelago, e.g. the duri-duri of the Batak, far west in Sumatra.

Modern madaka made of low carat gold with rough work are sold for the tourist market. These madaka objects are usually carved with fanciful additions of animals or human figures as an attempt to increase interest and price.

== Function ==
The madaka of Sumba are used as a kind of heirloom object that was accumulated by the clan leader through time and mostly kept in the interior. Together with other heirloom objects e.g. the marangga and the mamuli, madaka are kept in the attic of the noble's uma mbatangu or the traditional Sumbanese peaked house. They are brought into the light only during ritual occasions and under the control of the village priests.

The madaka is instrumental in marriage ceremonies, as it is one of the many objects. The madaka is given to the wife-taker from the family of the wife-giver.

== See also ==
- Mamuli
- Marangga

== Cited works ==
- Richter, Anne; Carpenter, Bruce W. (2012). Gold Jewellery of the Indonesian Archipelago. Editions Didier Millet. ISBN 9789814260381.
- Rodgers, Susan (1988). Power and gold: jewelry from Indonesia, Malaysia, and the Philippines : from the collection of the Barbier-Mueller Museum, Geneva. Prestek-Verlag. ISBN 9783791308593.
