= Mamuli =

Type of precious metal ornaments

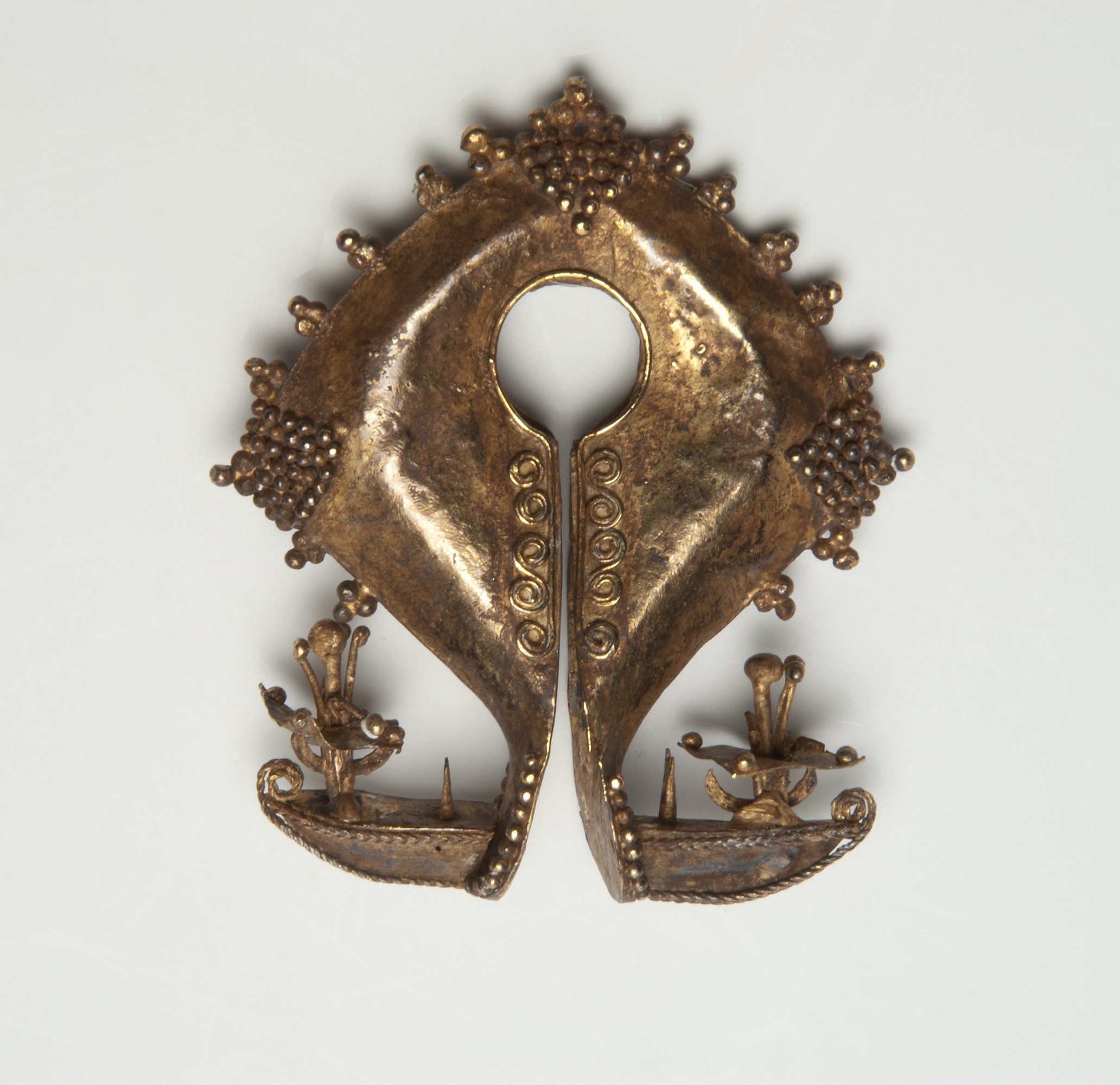
A golden Mamuli with flower decorating its base.

Mamuli are precious metal ornaments of the Sumba people, Sumba, Indonesia. They are found in the megalithic society of the western Sumba people, e.g. the Anakalang society. The mamuli ornaments have a shape which represents the female genitalia, symbolizing the woman as the giver of life. Mamuli are the most important Sumbanese precious metal valuables and are seen as heirloom objects which served in important exchange rituals.

== Form ==
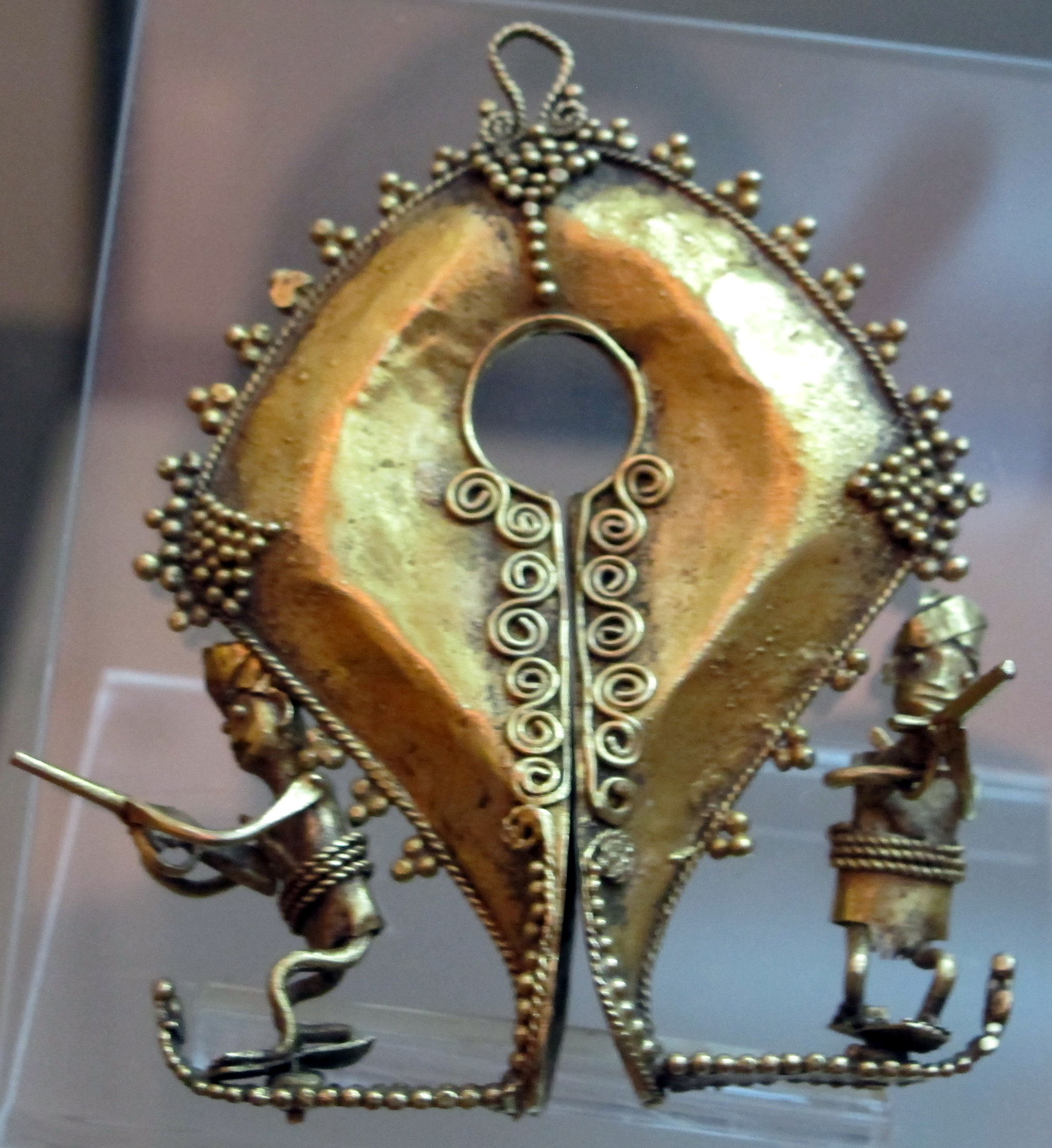
A late 19th-century mamuli carved with a figure of warrior holding guns, a clear influence of the colonial government.

The mamuli can be plain (lobu) or decorated (karagat). The basic lobu mamuli have the shape of a diamond with a concave center. There is a round hole and a slit in the middle which represents the female genitalia, a symbol of woman's sexuality and reproductive power. The decorated karagat mamuli (also known as ma pawisi ("those with feet") have additional finials at the bottom of the diamond-shaped center which gives it the shape of the letter omega. Additional figures are added on these finials, flanking the diamond-shaped female genitalia. These additional figures can be of roosters, cockatoos, horsemen, buffalo, goats, headhunting skull trees, or warriors; all symbols of male greatness. Thus the most decorated karagat mamuli are seen as male, while the simple undecorated lobu mamuli are seen as female. During the colonial period, Baroque versions of mamuli are carved, which included complex battle scenes and movable parts.

Mamuli are always a precious metal valuables, usually made of gold or silver. In Sumbanese mythology, precious metals are believed to be of celestial origin: the gold are deposited on earth when the sun sets, while the silver came from the setting of the moon or from the shooting of the stars.

== Function ==
Mamuli are basically ear ornaments worn on elongated earlobes of females and sometimes male. A very large mamuli are usually worn around the neck as pendants or hanged on the headdress. A mamuli can also be worn as a brooch on jacket. As a brooch, a mamuli is worn with other Sumbanese metal ornaments e.g. the flat twisted maraga, the crescent-shaped tabelu, and the circular wula; but the mamuli always has the best quality of all.

Mamuli play an essential role in the elaborate ceremonial gift exchanges practiced by the west Sumba people. The giving of a woman in marriage by one group to another is seen as the most intimate expression of the gift of life. The group from which she originates is regarded as the 'life-giving' group to whomever she marries. Because of this concept, marriage relationship is seen as key to the organization of Sumbanese society. Thus the society is divided into wife-givers and wife-takers. Mamuli are given by the wife-taking group to their wife-givers in a marriage. They become the heirloom of the family which is traded family to family and generation to generation. The exchange of mamuli can also happen in a household and not through marriage. For example, the pig is seen as the most valuable animal recognized as the property of a woman. A man who wishes to use a pig must obtain the permission of the woman who raised it and compensate her with the exchange of the mamuli to "cool the trough".

Mamuli are also seen as sacred relics which are usually found kept in the clan leader's treasuries. They are seen as a powerful relic to communicate with the spirits of the ancestors. Mamulis are rarely removed from their container, because their power are believed to kill onlookers or cause natural disasters.

As grave goods, mamuli accompany the soul to the land of the dead.

== See also ==
- Marangga
- Madaka

== Cited works ==
- Fox, James J. (1999). "Culture and Ritual in Indonesia: Rituals of Exchange and Alliance". In Fox, James J. (ed.). Religion and Ritual. Indonesian Heritage. Singapore: Archipelago Press. ISBN 9813018585.
- Holmgren, Robert J.; Spertus, Anita E. (1989). Early Indonesian Textiles from Three Island Cultures: Sumba, Toraja, Lampung. New York City: Metropolitan Museum of Art. ISBN 9780870995385.
- Keane, Webb (1997). Signs of Recognition: Powers and Hazards of Representation in an Indonesian Society. University of California Press. ISBN 9780520204751.
- Muhammad Husni; Tiarma Rita Siregar (2000). Perhiasan Tradisional Indonesia [Traditional Ornaments of Indonesia]. Direktorat Jenderal Kebudayaan.
- Richter, Anne; Carpenter, Bruce W. (2012). Gold Jewellery of the Indonesian Archipelago. Editions Didier Millet. ISBN 9789814260381.
