= Kabeala =

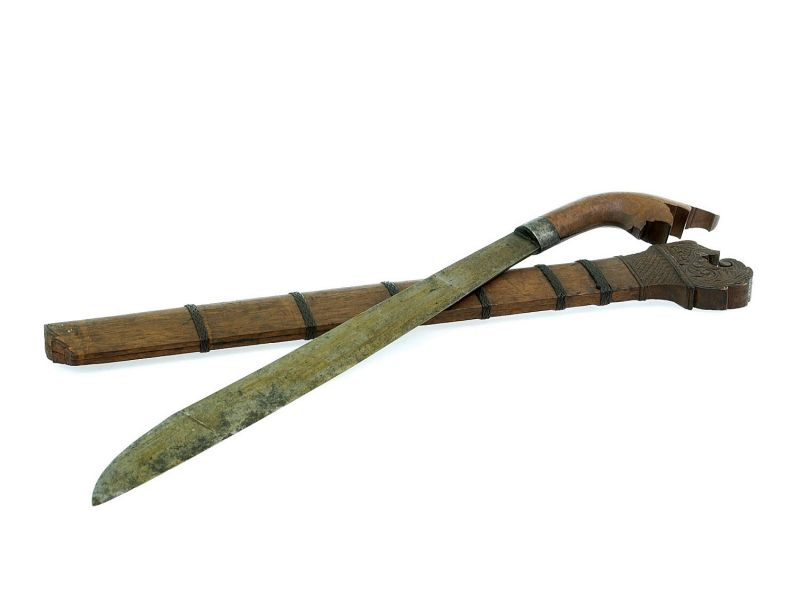
- A Kabeala, pre-1876.
- Type: Chopper, Machete
- Place of origin: Indonesia (Sumba)

Service history
- Used by: Sumba people

Specifications
- Length: approximately 50–60 cm (20–24 in)
- Blade type: Drop point blade with convex edge
- Hilt type: Water buffalo horn, wood
- Scabbard/sheath: Wood

Kabeala (sometimes Kabela, Kabeàla or Kabiala; which means "Parang" or "Golok" in East Sumba language) is a traditional weapon originating from East Sumba, Indonesia.

== Description ==
The Kabeala has a straight-backed blade with a somewhat convex edge. The blade broadens slightly towards the tip. Its back curves towards the edge at the tip. The hilt is solid, curving halfway at an angle of 45 degrees. The scabbard is straight and has a large number of woven strips to keep both parts together. Its mouth has a slanting protrusion towards the blade's sharp side.

== Culture ==
During funerals, a person is chosen to assume the role of a Papanggang (slave) whereby a man would carry a Kabeala while the woman would carry a Kahidi Yutu or Leiding knife. The traditional attire of a male Papanggang includes a black Kabeala, a symbol of prince.

== See also ==
- Blakas
