= Sumbanese traditional house =

Traditional vernacular house of the Sumba people

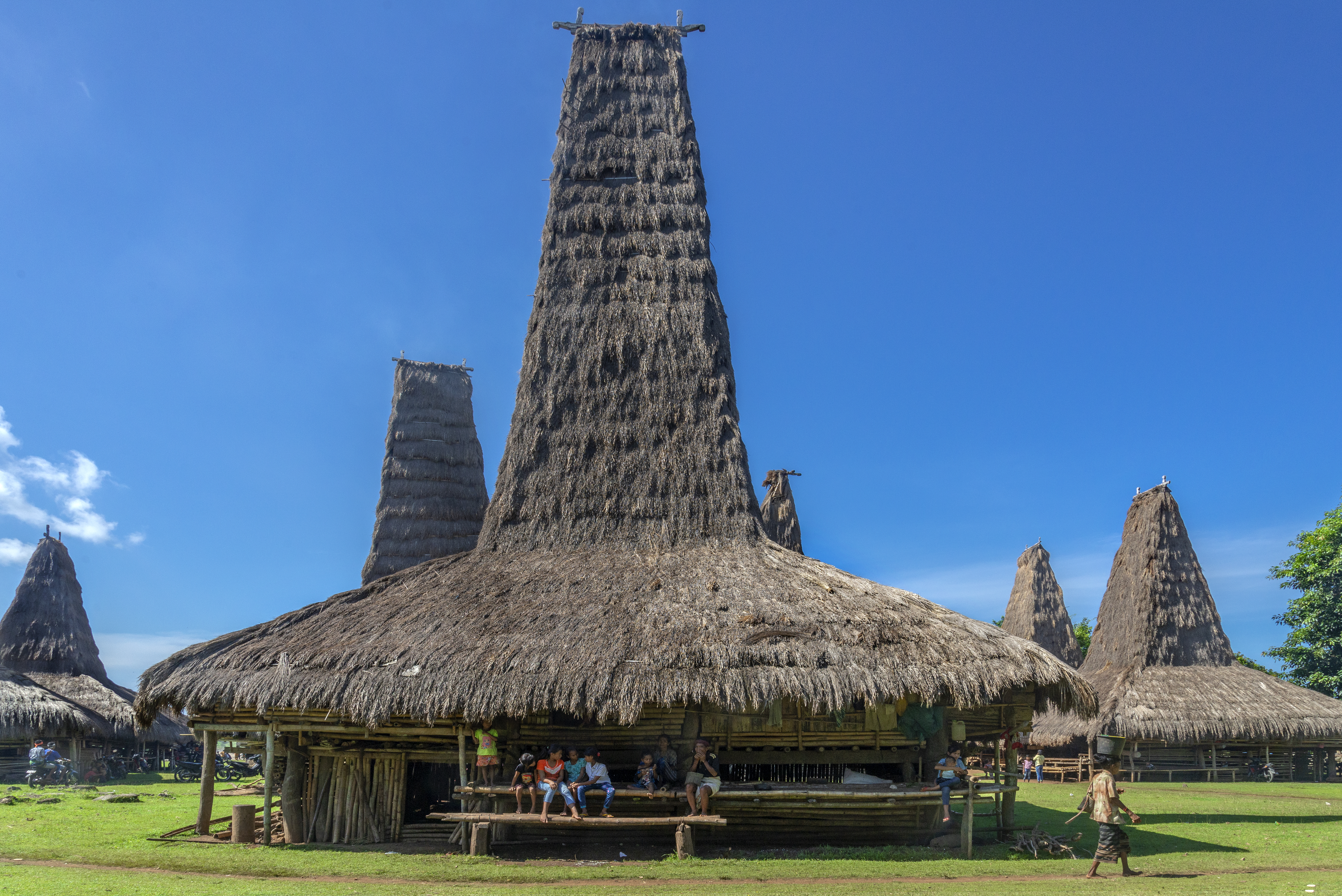
A Sumbanese traditional house with its distinctive high-pitched peak where the marapu resides.

The Sumbanese traditional house (Sumbanese uma mbatangu, "peaked house") refers to the traditional vernacular house of the Sumba people from the island of Sumba, Lesser Sunda Islands, Indonesia. A Sumbanese house is characterized by a high-pitched central peak on its roof and a strong connection with the spirits, or marapu.

== Tourism ==
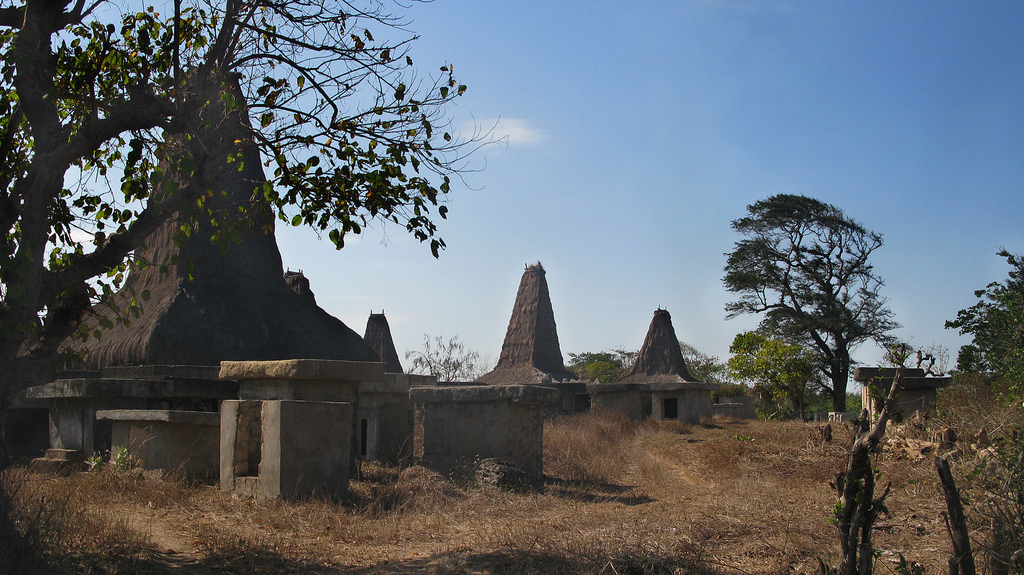
Wainyapu, where houses intermingle with dolmens as collective graves.

Several tourist attractions in this district have been widely explored and visited by a variety of local and foreign tourists, but there are only a few who have access to roads and adequate facilities and infrastructure available, namely Mananga Aba Beach, Mbawana beach, Oro Beach, Kawona Beach, Newa Beach, Pantai Waikelo, Sumba Cultural Home, Lake Saltwater Weekuri, and Pabeti Waterfall.

This district includes everal traditional villages such as Wainyapu and Ratenggaro on the south-west coast, and others inland. Wainyapu is particularly rich in dolmens, which - as of 2021 - are still built for collective graves.

Sumba Island contains several cultural and linguistic groups; however, all share a common architectural heritage. Animism is strong in Sumbanese society. Their indigenous religion focused on the marapu. Marapu includes spirits of the dead, of sacred places, of heirloom objects, and the instruments used to communicate with the spirit world. This concept affects the architectural space within the Sumbanese house and village. There are two main houses of the Sumbanese people. The most characteristic Sumbanese house is the uma mbatangu ("peaked house") of eastern Sumba, which features a high central peak. This roof is made of thatched alang-alang and is somewhat similar to the central peak of a Javanese joglo, although much more high-pitched. The biggest peaked house of Sumbanese people is known as uma bungguru (Sumbanese "house of the fellowship"). The house is the main house of the clan where important rituals relating with the unity of the clan are held, e.g. wedding ceremonies, funeral, and so on. The big house is also the permanent residence of the oldest person of the village. Other type of house is uma kamadungu ("bald house") which contains no central peak. The peak-less house is considered not 'hot' for a ritual, and so they are also known uma maringu or "cool house".

A basic Sumbanese house has a square layout. This layout can be as small as 5 x 5 meter of as big as 15 x 15 meter. Four main posts supported the roof peak of a house, these posts are imbued with mystical symbolism. A Sumbanese house can accommodate a single family or several extended families. Two entrance accesses are positioned to the left and right of the house. There is no window in a Sumbanese house, cross ventilation is provided from small openings in the wall, which is made of plaited palm boughs, areca sheath, or – among the very rich – buffalo hide. Buffalo horns often decorate the walls, a reminder to past sacrifice.

Traditional Sumbanese village is typically located on elevated sites, with houses (uma) forming two or more rows on either side of a central plaza. The central plaza is aligned north-south and contains megalithic tombs and other sacred objects, the overall impact is that the houses of Sumba people intermingles with the tombs.

== Construction ==
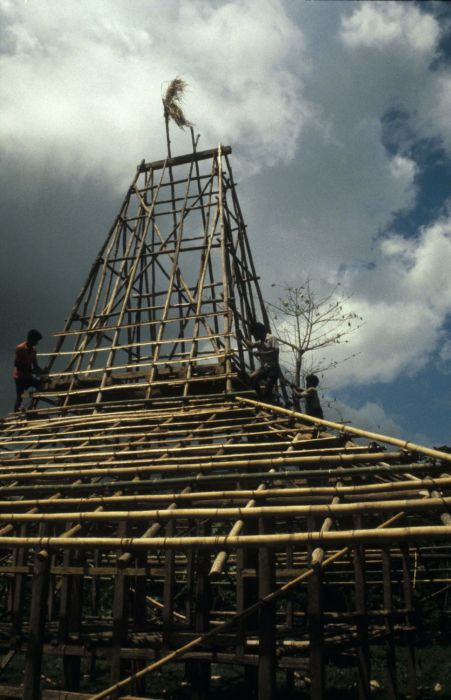
Construction of a Sumbanese house at Kabunduk.

The Sumbanese clan house is largely a timber and bamboo constructions, bamboo being more used on the western side of Sumba Island than on the east. Tree trunks constitute the four principal house posts and other load bearing elements. Only certain hardwoods are reserved for the construction of special ancestral houses (uma marapu). Walls are made from panels of plaited bamboo, or woven coconut leaf. Whole bamboo culms constitute the floor. The roof is made of a dense thatch of alang-alang grass, tied with coconut leaf to battens made from saplings.

== Layout and marapu ==
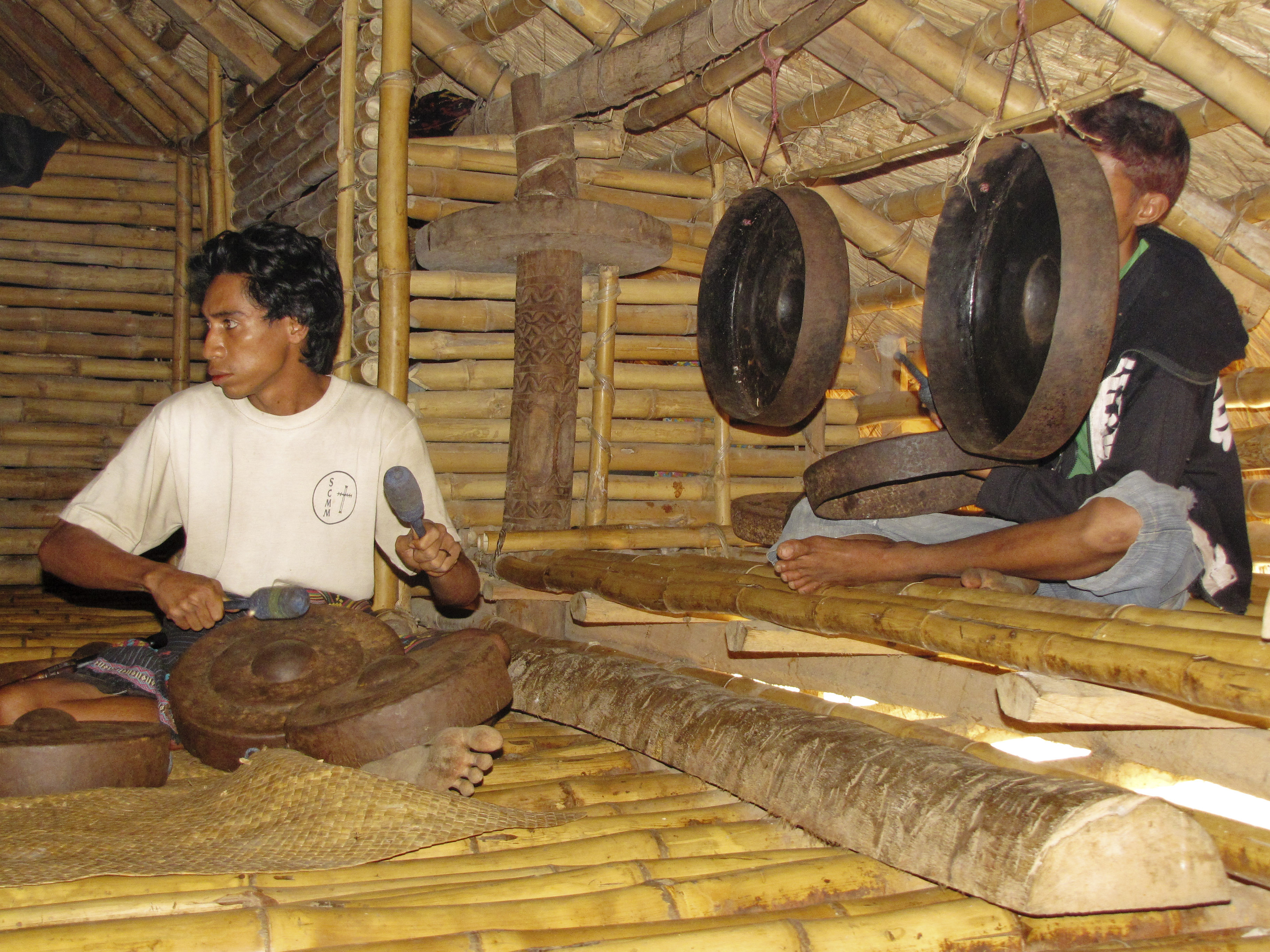
The left front post of a Sumbanese house is visible here complete with the special aperture where women passed rice to be offered to the marapu.

The space within a Sumbanese house is divided into three: the upper space, the middle space, and the lower space. The upper space (roughly the high-pitched peak roof area) is where sacred heirlooms are stored. This upper space is where the marapu resides. Food offerings and other rituals addressed to the ancestors are held in the upper space. Only older men are permitted to enter this otherwise empty part of the building, and even this is a rare occasion. The middle space of a Sumbanese house is where mundane activity is held, while the lower space (the space below the house) is where livestock, such as chicken and pig, are kept.

Another division of space is using the concept of right or left space (seen from outside the front facade). The space on the right is considered masculine, while the left is feminine. The right side of the house, called the "big (major) house floor" (kaheli bokulu) is largely reserved for ritual and other public affairs conducted by men. The left side of the house is named the "cool house floor" (kaheli maringu); and is associated with female domestic activities, such as preparing a meal, dining, and sleeping (simple compartments for sleeping are built along the left wall). In the Sumbanese society, women are considered "owners of houses" (mangu umangu) because they spend more time at home than men. On the other hand, men are associated with the exterior and with external relation among clans as well as communication with the spiritual being. Similarly, the door on the right front is reserved for male access, while the one on the left rear is reserved for female access; each leading to a slightly lower verandah and to the exterior.

The right-left and front-back dualities are further reflected onto the four main posts of the roof. These four posts supported the peak of the roof. A hearth is located at the center of these four main posts. During construction, the front-right post gets the first priority, followed by the back-right, then back-left, then front-left. The front-right post is called the "augury post" (kambaniru uratungu), the name is related with several rituals related with the marapu. A person will ask what the marapu wants and will learn the answer by sticking a spear into the front-right post. Being the most important part of the house, the front-right area of the house is also where Sumbanese people keep bundled mummified corpses. These corpses are placed in a sitting position and facing towards the main (right front) post in the same way as a priest engaged in ritual performances.

The back-right post is known as "the post that divides" (kambaniru mapaberingu) since this is where men butcher and divide the meat of sacrificed animals. The front-left post is named "the post that scoops the rice" (kambaniru mataku) so called because this is where women prepare rice before passing it through a special aperture to a priest who formally offers the food to marapu in the right front part of the house. The back-left post is called "the post that feeds chickens and pigs" (kambaniru matungu uhu wei, pani manu), linking the area with the care of animals sacrificed to marapu.

== See also ==
- Rumah adat
- Sumbanese people

== Works cited ==
- Forth, Gregory L. (1981). Rindi: An Ethnographic Study of a Traditional Domain in Eastern Sumba. Vol. 93. The Hague: KITLV. ISBN 9789024761692.
- Fox, James J., ed. (1998). Religion and Ritual. Indonesian Heritage. Vol. 9. Singapore: Archipelago Press. ISBN 9813018585.
- Gunawan Tjahjono, ed. (1998). Architecture. Indonesian Heritage. Vol. 6. Singapore: Archipelago Press. ISBN 9813018305.
- Wellem, F.D. (2004). Injil dan Marapu: suatu studi historis-teologis tentang perjumpaan Injil dengan masyarakat Sumba pada periode 1876-1990 [The Bible and Marapu: a historical-theological study on the arrival of the Bible into the society of Sumba 1876-1990] (in Indonesian). Jakarta: Gunung Mulia. ISBN 9796871718.
