= Wainyapu, Sumba =

Village in East Nusa Tenggara, Indonesia

Wainyapu
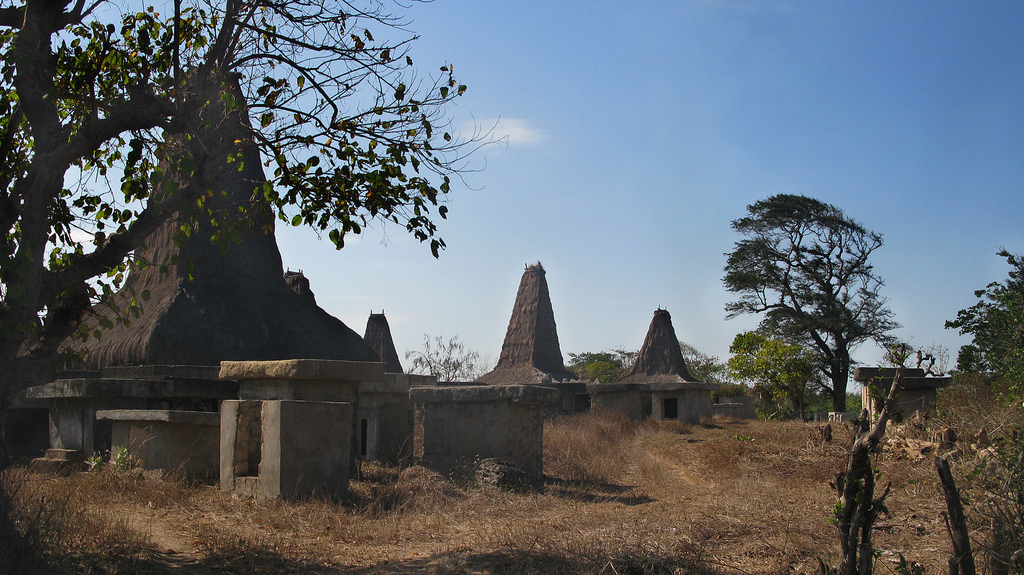

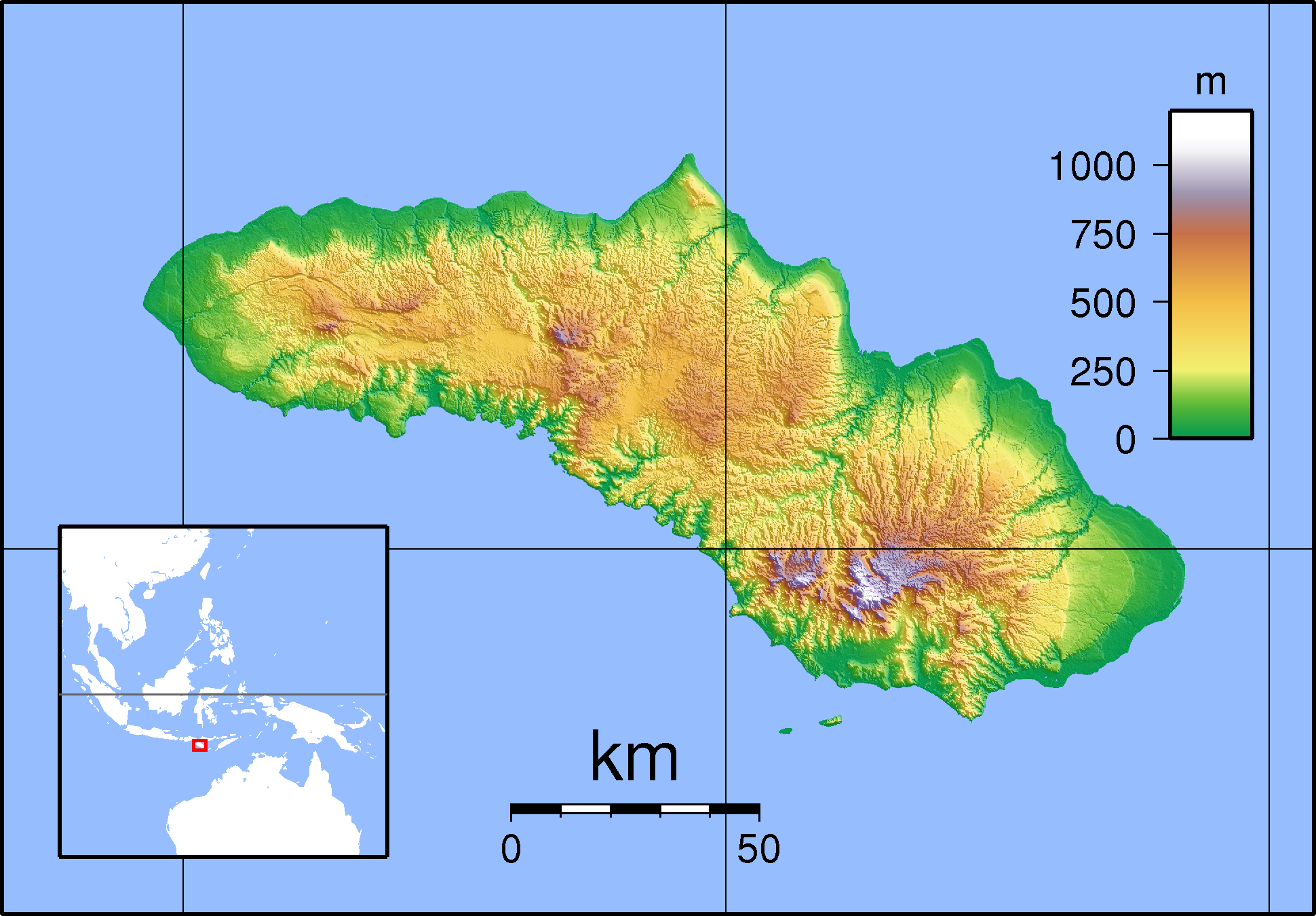
- Location in Indonesia Wainyapu (Indonesia)
- Coordinates: 9.630983504°S 119.00785583°E
- Country: Indonesia
- Region: Lesser Sunda Islands
- Province: East Nusa Tenggara
- Regency: Sumba Barat Daya
- Time zone: UTC+8 (WITA / UTC)

Wainyapu is a traditional village (desa) on Sumba island, East Nusa Tenggara province, Indonesia.

It has some 1,400 dolmens - one of the highest concentrations of these megaliths on Sumba.

== Location ==
Wainyapu is on the south-west coast of Sumba, about 8 kilometers (5.0 mi) from the western tip of the island and 200 kilometers (120 mi) west of Waingapu. It stands on the south side of the estuary of the Luku Lambatama river. The traditional village of Ratenggaro is within sight, just on the other side of the river.

Administratively, it is a village (desa) in Kodi Balaghar District, in Southwest Sumba Regency (Sumba Barat Daya).

== Dolmens ==
Wainyapu, a Kodi (Note: The Kodi are one of the 24 ethnic groups that inhabit Sumba. On that island coexist nine Austronesian languages, some of them including several dialects.) village, has some 1,400 dolmens — one of the highest concentrations on Sumba. This island is the last place on Earth where some cultures still follow the traditions of the hill tribes of South-East Asia and commonly build megaliths such as dolmens for collective graves. About 100 megalithic tombs are still built each year (as of 2021). These tombs are more frequent in the west part of Sumba, inhabited by segmentary societies made of clans and of politically autonomous villages.

Wainyapu follows the typical set-up where the dolmens are mainly within the village, many of them in front of the lineage's main house. Some dolmens are also outside the village in the fields or near the pastures.

Wainyapu owns a lime quarry that provides the huge slabs needed for the dolmens. In 2008, Anakalang prince Umbu Dingu ordered a 16-tons stone to cover the tomb of his father Reda Ana Buni. This stone slab was manually pulled by about 400 men from the quarry to the village on tree trunk rollers. The complete process of negotiations, extraction, paring, transport over some 5 kilometers (3.1 mi) and animal sacrifices, required some 4,000 persons and took two years to achieve.

== Connected article ==
- Kodi language
