= Tambolaka =

Tambolaka (Waitabula)
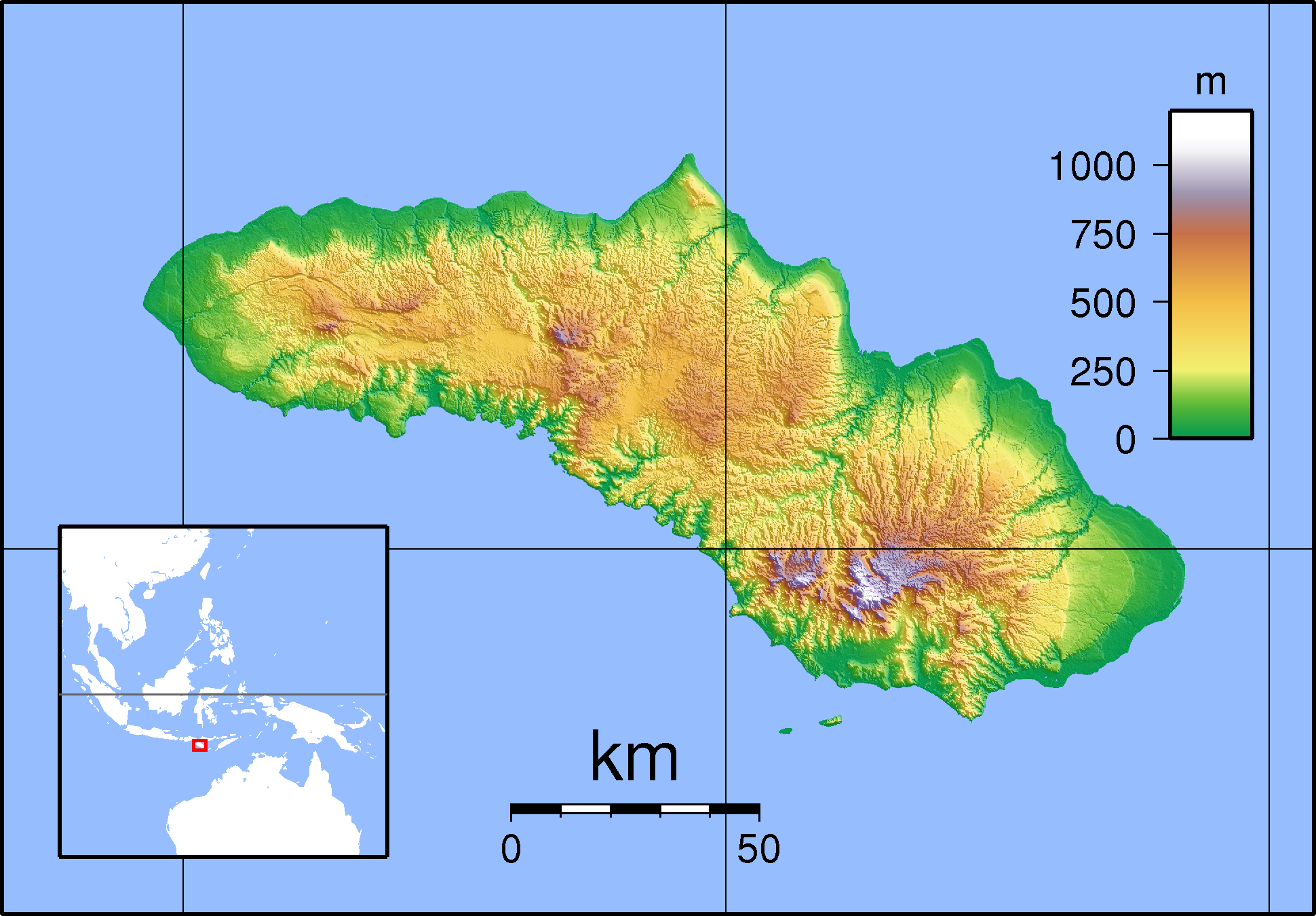
- Location in Indonesia Tambolaka (Waitabula) (Indonesia)
- Country: Indonesia
- Region: Lesser Sunda Islands
- Province: East Nusa Tenggara
- Regency: Southwest Sumba

Area
  - Total: 98.95 km^{2} (38.20 sq mi)

Population (2020 Census)
  - Total: 35,790
  - Metro density: 361.7/km^{2} (937/sq mi)
- Time zone: UTC+8 (WITA / UTC)

Tambolaka is the administrative capital of the Southwest Sumba Regency on the island of Sumba in the East Nusa Tenggara province of Indonesia. It serves as a key administrative and economic center for the western part of Sumba, particularly known for its airport which facilitates access to the region. The economy of is largely agrarian, with a focus on subsistence farming and livestock, alongside a growing tourism sector based on beaches, and cultural festivals.

== Geography ==
Tambolaka is the capital of the Southwest Sumba Regency, on the island of Sumba, which is part of the East Nusa Tenggara province of Indonesia. It was called as Waitabula in native language, before being known by the name of the airport. The town covers an area of 98.95 km^{2} (38.20 sq mi). The area around Tambolaka features a combination of coastal and inland highlands such as the Mount Setengah Dewa and the high plateau of Lendungara to the east of the city. Sumba houses over 200 bird species, 26 of which being endemic.

=== Climate ===
Tambolaka has a tropical savanna climate (Köppen Aw) with moderate to little rainfall from May to November and heavy rainfall from December to April.

Climate data for Tambolaka
Month	Jan	Feb	Mar	Apr	May	Jun	Jul	Aug	Sep	Oct	Nov	Dec	Year
Mean daily maximum °C (°F)	30.7 (87.3)	30.1 (86.2)	30.7 (87.3)	31.1 (88.0)	30.7 (87.3)	30.2 (86.4)	30.1 (86.2)	30.6 (87.1)	31.3 (88.3)	31.9 (89.4)	31.5 (88.7)	30.9 (87.6)	30.8 (87.5)
Daily mean °C (°F)	25.7 (78.3)	25.3 (77.5)	25.7 (78.3)	25.6 (78.1)	25.0 (77.0)	24.3 (75.7)	23.6 (74.5)	23.9 (75.0)	24.8 (76.6)	25.9 (78.6)	26.3 (79.3)	25.9 (78.6)	25.2 (77.3)
Mean daily minimum °C (°F)	20.7 (69.3)	20.6 (69.1)	20.7 (69.3)	20.2 (68.4)	19.4 (66.9)	18.4 (65.1)	17.2 (63.0)	17.3 (63.1)	18.4 (65.1)	19.9 (67.8)	21.2 (70.2)	21.0 (69.8)	19.6 (67.3)
Average rainfall mm (inches)	301 (11.9)	280 (11.0)	233 (9.2)	133 (5.2)	65 (2.6)	47 (1.9)	19 (0.7)	17 (0.7)	19 (0.7)	44 (1.7)	70 (2.8)	236 (9.3)	1,464 (57.7)
Source: Climate-Data.org

== Economy and infrastructure ==
The town has a cathedral, a hospital and a monastery. It also hosts the largest permanent market on Sumba and is a major trading center for west-facing villages. The town is served by Tambolaka Airport, located north of Tambolaka and the coastal and harbour town of Waikelo. Ground connectivity is there with other settlements within the island and ferry links to Bali. The economy of is largely agrarian, with a focus on subsistence farming and livestock, alongside a growing tourism sector based on beaches, cultural sites, handicrafts and festivals. The annual Pasola festival is a spear-throwing battle by men on horseback, to celebrate the harvests.
