= Marapu =

Tribal religion in Indonesia

The Marapu religion is a form of ancestral religion that is practiced mainly on the island of Sumba in Indonesia, as well as in remote areas of Flores. Both the Christians and Muslims on these islands tend to combine their faiths with Marapu. Since Marapu, like Kaharingan of the Dayaks, is not an official religion of Indonesia, and all Indonesian citizens are required to identify as a member of one of the religions sanctioned by law, members have chosen either Christianity or Islam to self identify.

== Lawsuit ==
A member of the Marapu religion, joining forces with representatives of three other indigenous religions, brought a court case to Indonesia's Constitutional court, arguing that the civil rights of Marapu followers suffered because they had not been recognized as one of Indonesia's six official religions (Islam, Protestantism, Catholicism, Hinduism, Buddhism, and Confucianism). On November 7, 2017, Indonesia's Constitutional Court decided in their favor, declaring that the earlier laws were discriminatory and violated the principle of equality under the law. In the past, those who failed to declare that they followed one of the recognized religions on their national identity cards could be denied rights to marriage registration or land titles.

== Distribution ==
According to Marapu activist Antonius Jawamara, there were around 200 thousand Marapu adherents in Sumba in 2000, and in 2023, there were 16,700 schoolchildren who professed Marapu as their religion in East Sumba Regency alone. Jawamara estimated that in 2023 there were around 100 thousand adherents in the whole of Sumba.

== Beliefs ==
Those who practice Marapu believe in temporary life in the world and eternal life in the Doomsday, the world of spirits in Marapu heaven – Prai Marapu. The word Marapu means:

- Firstly, the occupants of the eternal heaven, who lead a similar existence to men: they live in couples, and one of these couples is the ancestor of the Sumbanese.
- Secondly, the spirits of Sumbanese ancestors in Prai Marupu.
- Thirdly, the spirits of their relatives.
- Fourthly, all spirits dwelling in the universe: Marapu has mysterious and magical authority over human life.

=== Beliefs ===
According to Marapu beliefs, any spirit consists of two elements: Ndewa and Hamanangu. Marapu teachings concern the balance of universal life through which happiness can be gained.

This balance is symbolized by the Great Mother (Ina Kalada) and the Great Father (Ama Kalada) who live in the universe and take the forms of the moon and the sun. In mythology, they are husband and wife who gave birth to the ancestors of the Sumbanese.

Sumbans believe seven pairs of men and women descended from the sky on a ladder made of buffalo horns to a point in the north-central part of the island, and that suitably buried, they too will ultimately ascend this same ladder to be reunited with their families.

=== Practice ===
To honor Marapu, the Sumbanese put effigies, called Marapu statues, on stone altars where they lay their offerings in the forms of Sirih Pinang (a dish containing betel leaves, nuts, and lime) and sacrificial cattle. The statues of Marapu are made of wood in the shape of human faces. These images are usually placed in the yards of their houses or inside traditional houses.

A further manifestation of devotion to Merapu and the ancestors is reflected in the continuing construction in parts of East Sumba of impressive stone burial monuments, vestiges of one of the last surviving megalithic cultures on the planet. In many cases, individuals will put their families into debts extending into future generations in order to build these tombstones in the traditional manner.

=== Funeral ceremonies ===
Funeral ceremonies and burials can be delayed for decades during which the bodies of the deceased are kept in the homes of the living. Once sufficient funds have been acquired, it is not unusual for several generations of Sumbans to be buried or reburied together in segmented compartments of the below-ground tomb in a manner that does not violate incest taboos. While some now use winches and cattle trucks to lift and transport these stones, and others construct them out of cement, the practice of hauling slabs of rock weighing up to 70 tons atop log rollers across the countryside by hand persists in some eastern parts of the island.

The actual event is preceded by months of negotiations between allied clans and villages culminating in hundreds of men participating in the tarik batu stone-pulling ceremony. Necessary rites include butchering large numbers of buffalo, cows, pigs, and occasionally horses, and nightly protection rituals at the quarries where the stones are cut. Failure to perform the necessary rites risks an angry response from outraged ancestral forces, whose approval is sought through the divining of animal innards.

=== Adaptation ===
While the influence of evangelical churches is growing in Sumba and reflected in mass conversion ceremonies, many islanders retain their beliefs and practice in secret. These conversions can be traumatic for elderly Sumbans who believe that by converting they sever the relationship with their forebears. Others, particularly young people, convert for more pragmatic reasons: Indonesia formally recognizes five state religions, and sought-after positions in the civil service, police and military are closed to Merapu practitioners.

While not common, there are cases where devout Christianized Sumbans have rebuilt ancestral burial tombs or provided money and support to ensure previous generations are buried in the prescribed manner. Similarly, Christian Sumbans are often buried in cement tombs modeled on the Merapu, though the service is conducted by church officials.
