= Southwest Sumba Regency =

Regency in East Nusa Tenggara, Indonesia

Southwest Sumba Regency Kabupaten Sumba Barat Daya
- Regency
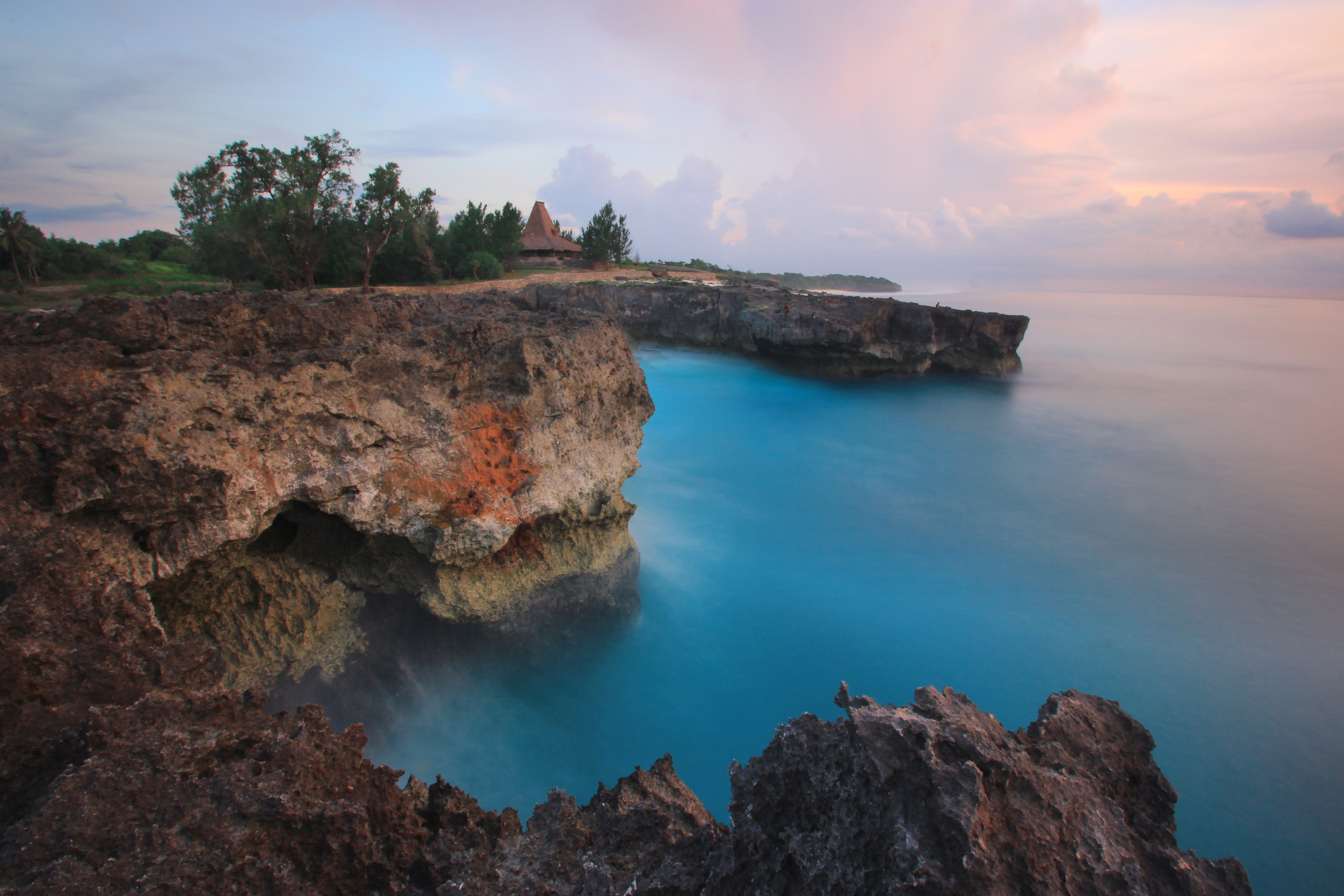
- Mandorak beach

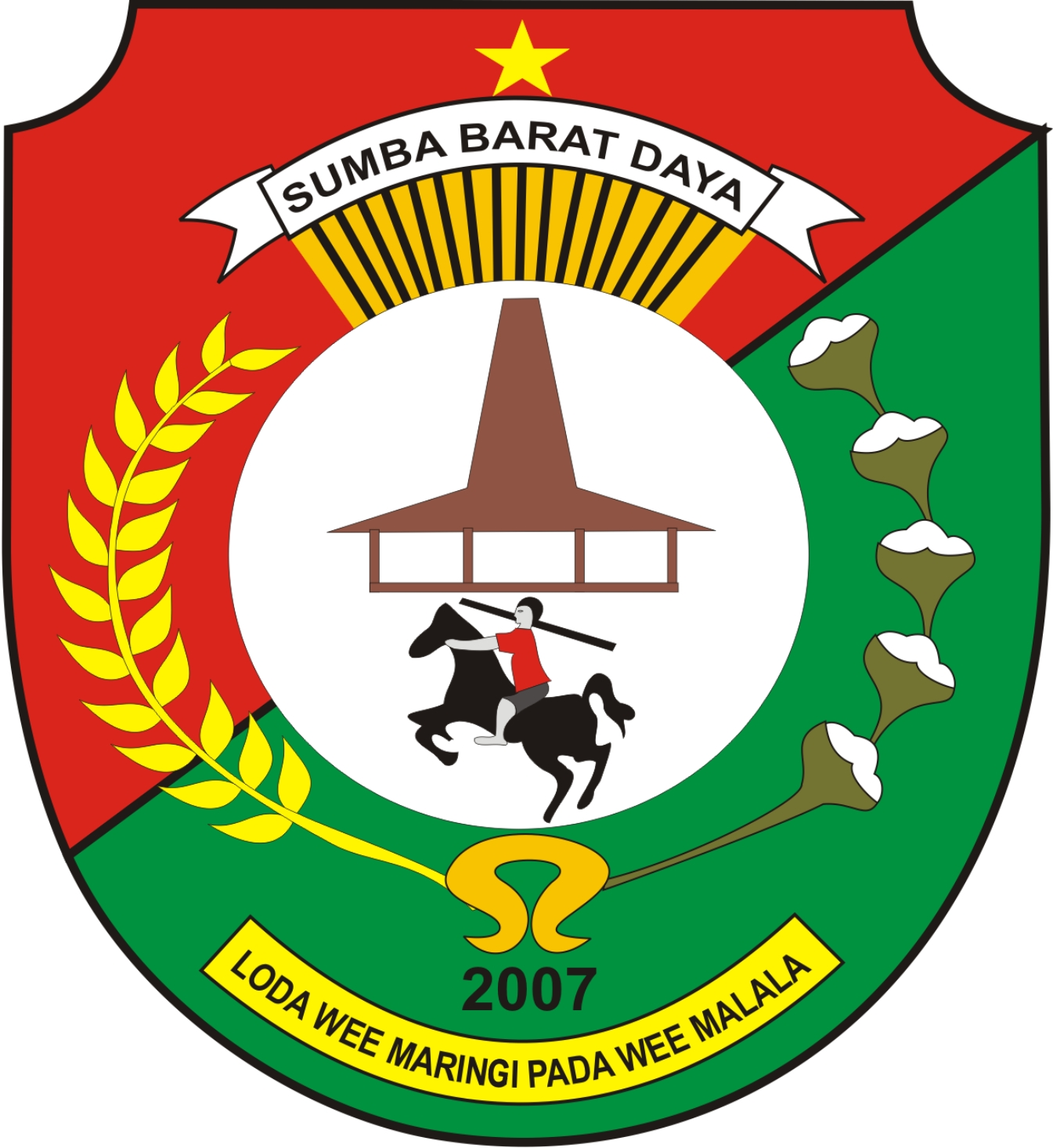
- Coat of arms
- Motto(s): Loda Wee Maringi Pada Wee Malala, (Blessed land, briskly place)
- Location within East Nusa Tenggara

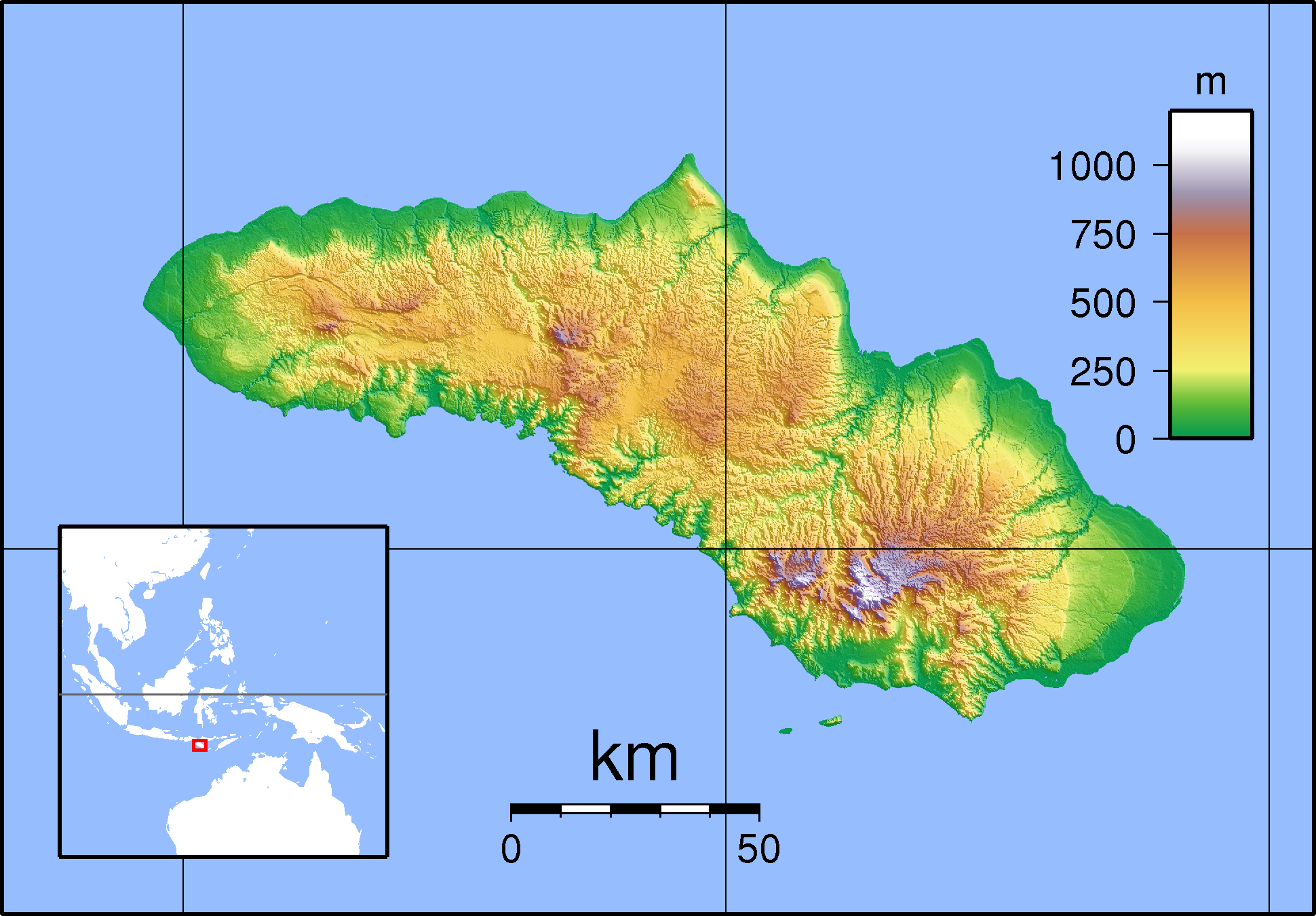
- Location in Sumba, Lesser Sunda Islands and Indonesia Southwest Sumba Regency (Lesser Sunda Islands) Southwest Sumba Regency (Indonesia)
- Coordinates: 9.5622°S 119.0891°E
- Country: Indonesia
- Region: Lesser Sunda Islands
- Province: East Nusa Tenggara
- Capital: Tambolaka

Government
  - Regent: Ratu Ngadu Bonu Wulla
  - Vice Regent: Dominikus Alphawan Rangga Kaka

Area
  - Total: 1,381.94 km^{2} (533.57 sq mi)

Population (mid 2025 estimate)
  - Total: 366,496
  - Density: 265.204/km^{2} (686.875/sq mi)
- Area code: (+62) 387
- Website: sbdkab.go.id

Southwest Sumba Regency (Indonesian: Kabupaten Sumba Barat Daya) is a regency on Sumba Island in East Nusa Tenggara province of Indonesia. Established on 2 January 2007 out of parts of West Sumba Regency, the regency has its seat (capital) in Tambolaka (part of the town of Waitabula in the north), while Bondokodi in the largest village in the west. Its population was 283,818 in the 2010 decennial census and had risen to 303,650 at the 2020 census; the official estimate as of mid-2025 was 366,496.

== Administrative districts ==
The Southwest Sumba Regency when created was composed of eight districts (kecamatan), but since 2010, three additional districts have been created within the Regency, by the splitting of existing districts. The areas (in km^{2}) and the populations of the districts at the 2010 census and the 2020 census are listed below, together with the official estimates as of mid-2025. The table also includes the locations of the district administrative centres, and the number of administrative villages in each district (totaling 173 rural desa and 2 urban kelurahan - the latter both in Kota Tambolaka District).

Kode Wilayah	Name of District (kecamatan)	Area in km^{2}	Pop'n census 2010	Pop'n census 2020	Pop'n estimate mid 2025	Admin centre	No. of villages	Post code
53.18.06	Kodi Bangedo	75.93	36,057	17,220	21,634	Walla Ndimu	15	87264
53.18.11	Kodi Balaghar	124.80	^{(a)}	17,980	22,782	Panenggo Ede	14	87262
53.18.07	Kodi	74.95	31,223	30,010	37,076	Bondo Kodi	19	87261
53.18.08	Kodi Utara (North Kodi)	220.32	50,864	48,860	59,958	Kori	21 ^{(b)}	87260
	Totals western (Kodi) part	496.00	118,149	114,070	141,450		69	
53.18.05	Wewewa Selatan (South Wewewa)	187.23	21,691	22,800	27,969	Tena Teke	14	87263
53.18.04	Wewewa Barat (Central Wewewa) (West Wewewa)	156.44	45,482	42,270	52,029	Waimangura	20	87253
53.18.03	Wewewa Timur (East Wewewa)	133.16	53,911	26,410	31,686	Elopada	19	87250
53.18.10	Wewewa Tengah (Central Wewewa)	104.53	^{(c)}	31,160	36,633	Ndapa Taka	20	87252
53.18.02	Wewewa Utara (North Wewewa)	43.37	11,638	12,640	14,053	Palla	12	87251
53.18.01	Loura	158.80	34,037	18,540	21,672	Karuni	11 ^{(d)}	87254
53.18.09	Kota Tambolaka (Tambolaka town)	102.42	^{(c)}	35,790	41,004	Tambolaka	10 ^{(e)}	87255
	Totals eastern (Wewewa) part	885.94	166,759	191,762	225,046		106	

Notes: (a) The 2010 census populations of Kodi Balaghar is included with the figures for Kodi Bangedo, from which it was split.
(b) including the desa of Wee Wella, which is an exclave separated from the rest of the district by a detached part of Kota Tambolaka District.
(c) The 2010 census populations of Kota Tambolaka and Wewewa Tengah Districts are included with the figures for the districts from which they were split.
(d) including the desa of Wee Kambala, which is an exclave separated from the rest of the district by Kota Tambolaka District.
(e) including the two kelurahan of Waitabula (which includes the regency capital of Tambolaka, the former community of Radamata and the main airport) and Langga Lero (adjoining Waitabula to the south); the district also includes the desa of Kalembu Kaha, which is an exclave separated from the rest of the district by Wewewa Barat and Kodi Utara Districts.

The Kalaki Kambe desa (of Wewewa Barat District) forms a salient from the rest of that district towards the north coast of Sumba island, reaching the coast between the desa of Wee Wella (an exclave of Kodi Utara District) and Kalembu Kaha (an exclave of Kota Tambolaka District) to the west and the desa of Wee Kambala (an exclave of Loura District) to the east. The populations in 2025 of these detached desa (which together form a non-administrative grouping along the northcoast of the regency) were as follows:

Kode Wilayah	Name of village (desa)	Name of District (kecamatan)	Area in km^{2}	Pop'n estimate mid 2025
53.18.09.2010	Kalembu Kaha	Kota Tambolaka	11.79	3,689
53.18.08.2015	Wee Wella	Kodi Utara	16.94	2,558
53.18.04.2015	Kalaki Kambe	Wewewa Barat	9.69	2,454
53.18.01.2015	Wee Kambala	Loura	8.37	1,229
	Totals		46.79	9,930

== Tourism ==
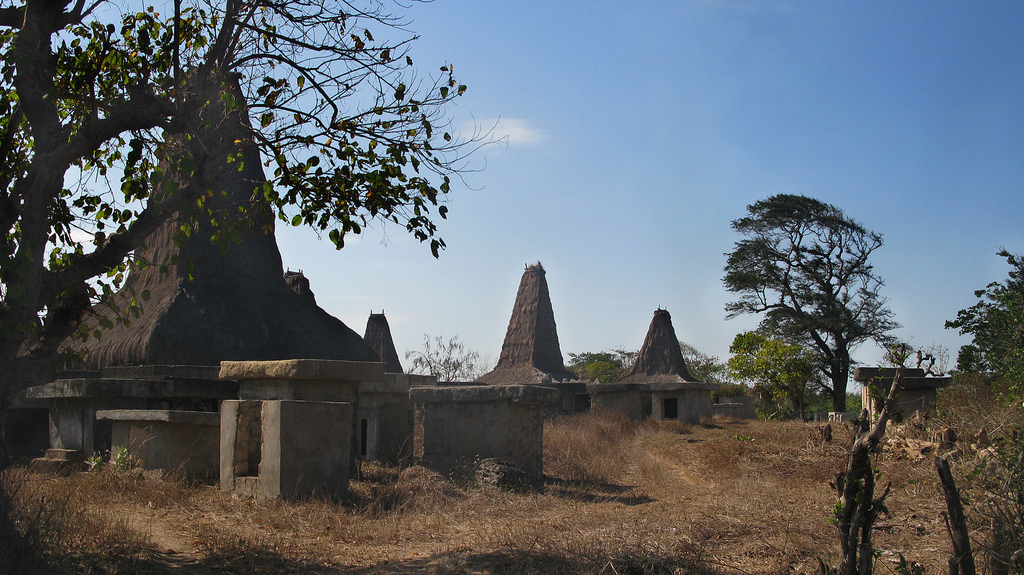
Wainyapu

Several tourist attractions in this district have been widely explored and visited by a variety of local and foreign tourists, but there are only a few who have access to roads and adequate facilities and infrastructure available, namely Mananga Aba Beach, Mbawana beach, Oro Beach, Kawona Beach, Newa Beach, Pantai Waikelo, Sumba Cultural Home, Lake Saltwater Weekuri, and Pabeti Waterfall.

This district includes several traditional villages such as Wainyapu and Ratenggaro on the south-west coast, and others inland. Wainyapu is particularly rich in dolmens, which - as of 2021 - are still built for collective graves.
