= Anakalang =

Village and megalithic site in Indonesia

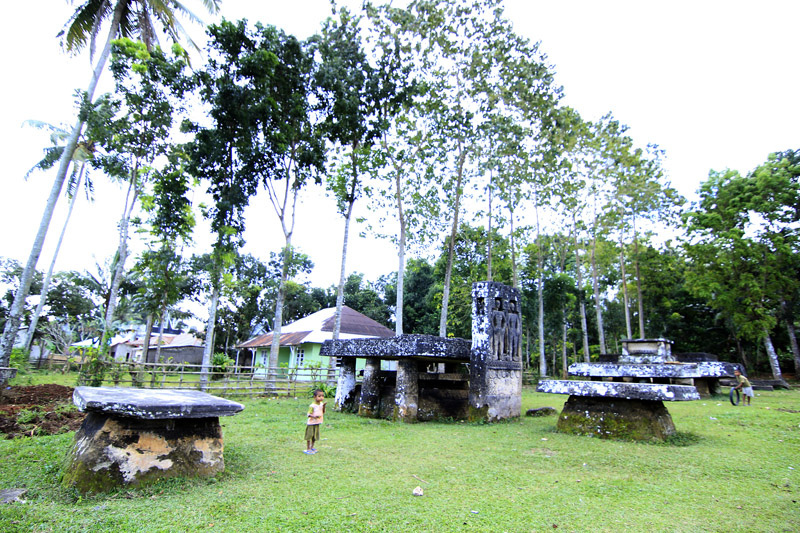
- Megalithic royal grave stone in Anakalang, Central Sumba.

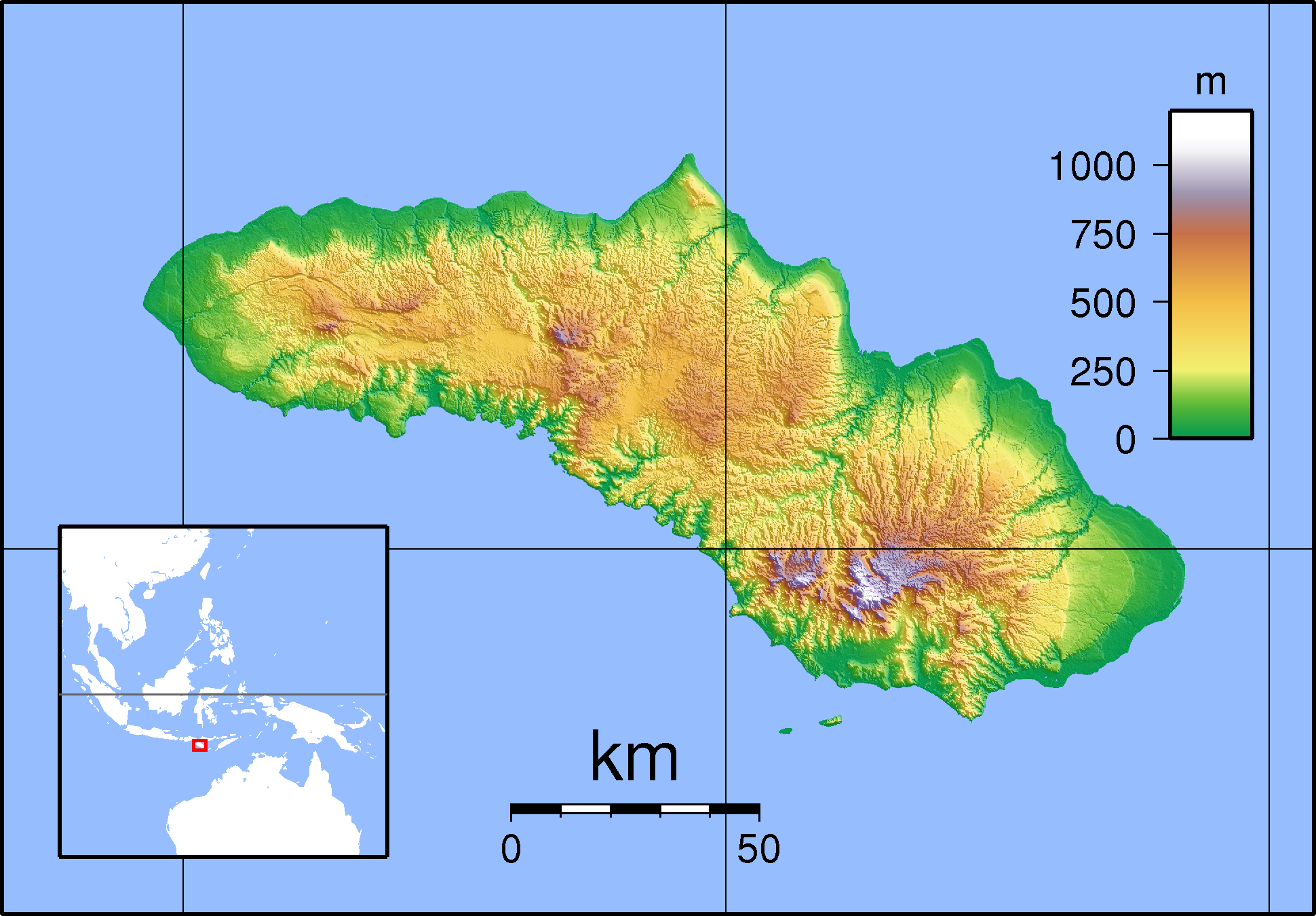
- Location in Sumba
- 9.590833°S 119.574433°E
- Location: Sumba, Lesser Sunda Islands, East Nusa Tenggara, Indonesia

History
- Built: Unknown

Anakalang is a village area (desa) and a small kingdom in the western part of Sumba island, in eastern Indonesia. It is noted for numerous megalithic tombs and its quadrangular adzes.

== Location, transport ==
Administratively, the village (desa) of Anakalang is in the district (kecamatan) of Katiku Tana or Katikutana, in Central Sumba Regency (kabupaten Sumba Tengah).

Geographically, it is in a valley at the center of the western part of Sumba island, 115 kilometers (71 mi) west of Waingapu and 25 kilometers (16 mi) north-east of Waikabubak.
It is 5 kilometers (3.1 mi) north of Waibakul, where is found the road that links Tambolaka (60 kilometers (37 mi) in the north-west to Waingapu in the east. Buses arrive there at regular intervals.

Its area is elongated on a north–south axis, stretching in length to about 7 kilometers (4.3 mi). It includes the traditional village of Pasunga (just off Waibakul)

== History ==
In 1880, Umbu Dongu Ubini Mesa became the first raja of Anakalang. In 1927, Umbu Sappy Pateduk succeeded to the title and was raja until 1953, gathering much power through multiple strategic marriages. Umbu Remu Samapati was the third raja, and his brother-in-law, Umbu Sulung Ibilona, succeeded him.

== Culture ==
Linguistically, Anakalang (Note: Regarding the Anakalang language, see: Budasi, I Gede (2019). "Bukti-Bukti Leksikal Pembeda Bahasa Wanokaka dan Anakalang di Sumba NTT" [Lexical Evidences Which Differentiate Wanokaka and Anakalang Languages in Sumba-East Nusa Tenggara]. Mabasan (summary in English). 4 (1): 24–42.; Budasi, I Gede (2012). "Comparison of Verb Phrases in English and Anakalang Language Basic Sentences". Prasi. 7 (14): 23–29.) is part of East Sumba, although politically and geographically it is situated within West Sumba. The women are mainly weavers, making baskets and mats, while the men are involved in string twining etc. Ornaments are taken care of and hidden away for ancestors.

A mass marriage festival is held there every two years, on a date based on the full moon. This major social interaction and display of negotiations are ritualist events, follows strict rules that serve to reinforce and perpetuate social relations.

== Megalithic tombs ==
Sumba island is the last place on Earth where some cultures still follow the traditions of the hill tribes of South-East Asia and commonly build megaliths such as dolmens for collective graves. About 100 megalithic tombs are still built each year (as of 2021). These tombs are more frequent in the west part of Sumba, inhabited by segmentary societies made of clans and of politically autonomous villages.

Anakalang area is noted for its quadrangular adzes and numerous megalithic tombs — although not as numerous as in Wainyapu (near the west coast), who boasts one of the highest concentrations of these megaliths on Sumba with some 1,400 dolmens., which are said to include the best ones in West Sumba. They are large and well decorated and contain unusual carvings. Anakalang is the home of the "Purung Takadonga Ratu", an important queen. The megalithic tombs spread over many villages.

At Pasunga on the main road, there is one of the largest tombs in Sumba. Some 1 km south of the main road from Pasunga, is the traditional village of Kabunduk (Kabonduk) where new and old is mixed.

A megalithic tomb in the village has a stone slab erected vertically. Its carved images date to 1926, having taken six months to complete. The burial ceremony involved the sacrifice of 150 buffaloes; their horns are kept in a local house.
Another tomb is on the same road about 2.5 kilometers (1.6 mi) away at Koboduk village. This tomb is made of concrete and tiles. It is reported to be the largest tomb in Samba.
The largest megalithic grave in Sumba is in Gallubakul, about 3.5 km south of Pasunga: chiseled out of a single rock, it took six years to create and is known as the Umba Saola tomb. It is 5 by 4 meters (16 by 13 ft) and 1 meter (3 ft 3 in) in thickness, weighing 70 metric tons (77 short tons). It was pulled from the hill slope where it was carved over a distance of 3 kilometers (1.9 mi) to the grave site in Anakalang.
Other tombs are on the eastern side of the burial location. These are upright slabs with carvings of the local king and queen, with motifs of buffaloes and cockerels. Close to this tomb, the Raja's son lives with his wife and narrates the story to visitors. (Note: Wainyapu near the west coast owns a lime quarry that provides the huge slabs needed for the dolmens. In 2008, Anakalang prince Umbu Dingu ordered a 16-tons stone to cover the tomb of his father Reda Ana Buni. This stone slab was manually pulled by about 400 men from the quarry to the village on tree trunk rollers. The complete process of negotiations, extraction, paring, transport over some 5 kilometers (3.1 mi) and animal sacrifices, required some 4,000 persons and took two years to achieve.)

With no radiocarbon dating so far, there is a debate on the exact age of the site. A stone schist grave with three adzes in it is deemed to be post-Neolithic though no iron objects were found. The quadrangular adzes found in a small cist do not exhibit characteristics of the Neolithic age and may be post-Neolithic.
