= Pondok language =

Austronesian language

Pondok
- Native to: Indonesia
- Region: Sumba Island
- Language family: Austronesian: Malayo-Polynesian; Central–Eastern; Sumba–Flores; Sumba–Hawu; Sumba; Central; Pondok

Language codes
- ISO 639-3: None (mis)
- Glottolog: None

Pondok is an Austronesian language spoken on Sumba, Indonesia.
