= Klamer =

Klamer may refer to:

- Klamer, a tributary of the Klasop River of West Papua
- a surname; notable people with this name include:
  - Evan Klamer (1923–1978), Danish cyclist
  - Marian Klamer (born 1965), Dutch linguist
  - Rachel Klamer (born 1990), Dutch triathlete
  - Renze Klamer (born 1989), Dutch radio and television presenter
  - Reuben Klamer, American inventor

== See also ==
- Franz Klammer (born 1953), Austrian ski racer
