= LMY =

LMY or lmy may refer to:

- LMY, the Amtrak station code for Lamy station, New Mexico, United States
- LMY, the IATA code for Lake Murray Airport, Papua New Guinea
- lmy, the ISO 639-3 code for Lamboya language, Indonesia
