= Anakalangu language =

Austronesian language of Sumba, Indonesia

Anakalangu
- Native to: Indonesia
- Region: Sumba Island
- Ethnicity: 16,000 (2011)
- Language family: Austronesian: Malayo-Polynesian; Central–Eastern; Sumba–Flores; Sumba–Hawu; Sumba; Central; Anakalangu

Language codes
- ISO 639-3: akg
- Glottolog: anak1240
- ELP: Anakalangu

Anakalangu is an Austronesian language spoken on Sumba, Indonesia.
