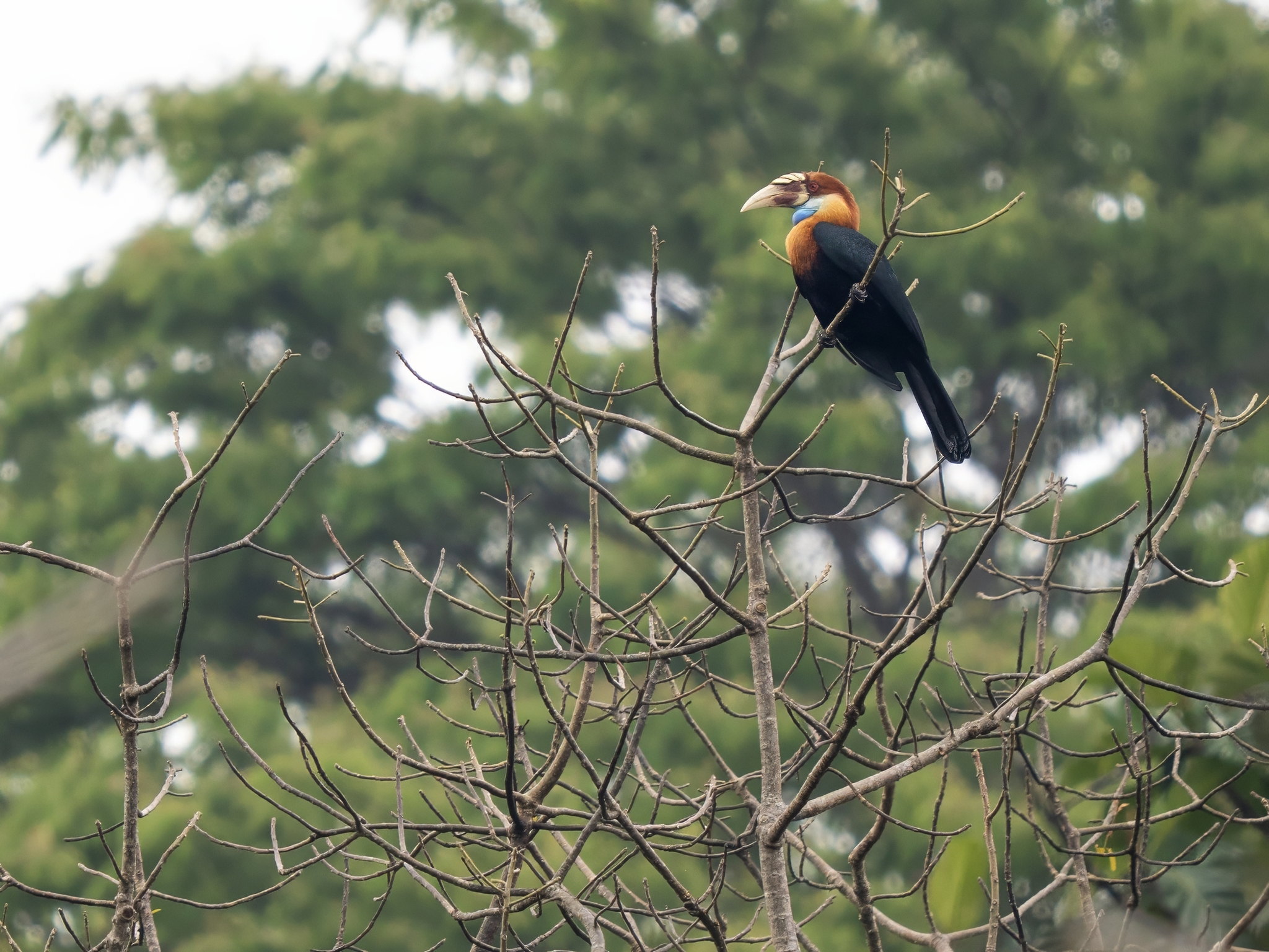

Conservation status
- Endangered (IUCN 3.1)
- CITES Appendix II

Scientific classification
- Kingdom: Animalia
- Phylum: Chordata
- Class: Aves
- Order: Bucerotiformes
- Family: Bucerotidae
- Genus: Rhyticeros
- Species: R. everetti

Binomial name
- Rhyticeros everetti Rothschild, 1898

Synonyms
- Aceros everetti

= Sumba hornbill =

Species of bird

Sumba hornbill (Latin: Rhyticeros everetti), or known natively as Julang (in Sumba languages) is a large bird belonging to the family of Bucerotidae, endemic and native to the Indonesian island of Sumba. The scientific name commemorates British colonial administrator and zoological collector Alfred Hart Everett.

== Description ==
It is a medium-sized, blackish hornbill, approximately 70 cm long. The male is dark reddish-brown on the crown and nape, with a paler neck. The female has entirely black plumage. Both sexes have a large, dull, yellowish bill with a maroon patch at the base, a serrated casque, and an inflatable blue throat.

== Distribution and habitat ==
An Indonesian endemic, the Sumba hornbill inhabits semi-evergreen forests of Sumba in the Lesser Sunda Islands. It is uncommon and found in the lowlands at altitudes of up to 950 m (3,120 ft).

== Behaviour ==
The Sumba hornbill is a monogamous species. Its diet consists mainly of fruits.

== Status and conservation ==
Due to ongoing habitat loss, limited range, small population size and overhunting in some areas, the Sumba hornbill is assessed as Vulnerable on the IUCN Red List of Threatened Species. It is listed on Appendix II of CITES. Part of its habitat is protected in the Laiwangi Wanggameti National Park and the Manupeu Tanah Daru National Park.
