= Sumba–Hawu languages =

Subgroup of the Austronesian languages

Sumba–Hawu
- Geographic distribution: Indonesia
- Linguistic classification: Austronesian: Malayo-Polynesian; Central–Eastern; Sumba–Flores; Sumba–Hawu
- Subdivisions: Hawu–Dhao; Sumba

Language codes
- ISO 639-3: –
- Glottolog: sumb1242

The Sumba–Hawu languages are a group of closely related Austronesian languages, spoken in East Nusa Tenggara, Indonesia.

The most widely spoken Sumba–Hawu language is Kambera, with a quarter million speakers on the eastern half of Sumba Island.

The Hawu language of Savu Island is suspected of having a non-Austronesian substratum, but perhaps not to a greater extent that other languages of central and eastern Flores, such as Sika, or indeed of Central Malayo-Polynesian in general.

== Classification ==
The Sumba–Hawu languages are all closely related. Blust (2008) found convincing evidence for linking Kambera (representing the Sumba languages) with Hawu.

- Sumba–Hawu
  - Hawu–Dhao
    - Hawu
    - Dhao
  - Sumba languages
    - Central–East Sumbanese
      - East Sumbanese: Kambera (dialect cluster)
      - Mamboru
      - Central Sumbanese
        - Anakalangu
        - Wanukaka
        - Ponduk
        - Baliledu
    - Wejewa–Lamboya
    - Kodi–Gaura
