= Mamboru language =

Language spoken in Indonesia

Mamboru
- Native to: Indonesia
- Region: Sumba Island
- Native speakers: 10,000 (2007)
- Language family: Austronesian: Malayo-Polynesian; Central–Eastern; Sumba–Flores; Sumba–Hawu; Sumba; Central–East; Mamboru

Language codes
- ISO 639-3: mvd
- Glottolog: mamb1305
- ELP: Mamboru

Mamboru (Memboro) is an Austronesian language spoken on Sumba, Indonesia.
