= Mbaru Niang =

Traditional house of Wae Rebo, Indonesia

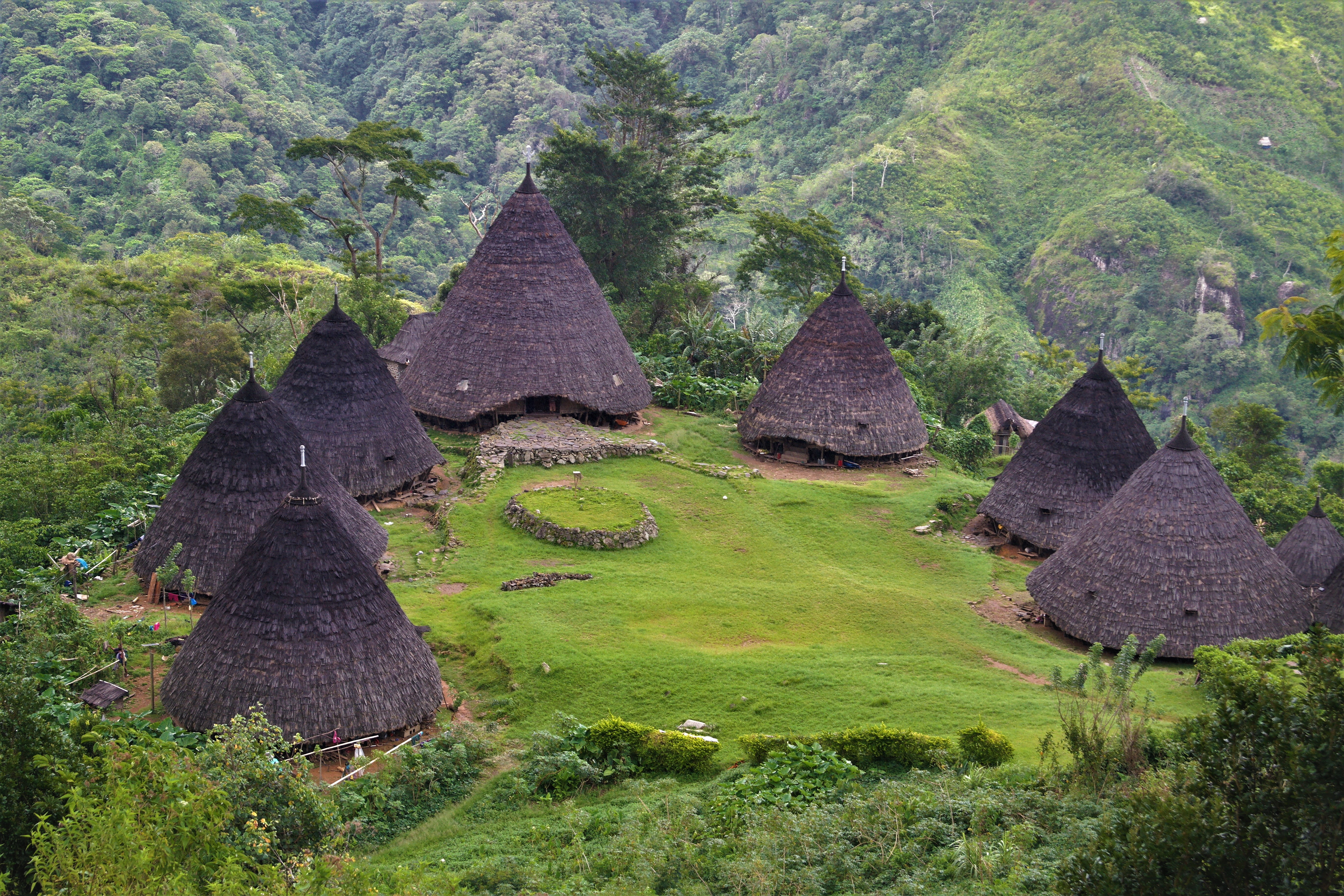
Mbaru Niang

Mbaru Niang is a Manggarainese traditional house in Waerebo, Satar Lenda Village, Satar Mesa District, Manggarai Regency.

== Form and philosophy ==
The name mbaru niang consists of two words, mbaru and niang. The word mbaru means house, while the word niang means tall and round. This name represents the form of mbaru niang, a cone tapering upwards. The form of mbaru niang is interpreted as a Manggarainese life philosophy in Wae Rebo. The Manggarainese believe that balance is represented by a circle. Thus, the shape of houses and the layout of villages constructed by the Manggarainese follow circular patterns.

Mbaru Niang is built with seven houses arranged in a circular shape on flat land. In the middle of the circle, there is an altar called compang. Compang is the central point of the seven Mbaru Niang houses, and it is the most sacred location for the Manggarainese in Wae Rebo. The compang altar is used to worship God and ancestral spirits.

== Location ==
Mbaru Niang is located in the traditional settlement of the Manggarai people in Waerebo, Satar Lenda Village, Satar Mesa District, Manggarai Regency. The location of Waerebo Village is at coordinates 8°46'8.88" South Latitude and 120°17'1.81" East Longitude. It is situated at an altitude of 1,120 meters above sea level on the slopes of Gonto Ponto, which reaches a height of 1,782 meters above sea level.

== Construction ==
=== Old design ===
The old design of mbaru niang only consists of one door without windows. The door is located at the front and serves as both an entrance and exit. Mbaru Niang's interior was very dark due to the absence of windows. However, the conditions inside the old Mbaru Niang are unknown because of the lack of information. It is estimated that there were no separate bedrooms for each family in the old design. This is because the number of inhabitants in the mbaru niang reached hundreds, so it is assumed that they only slept on the floor. There was only one empty space in the old design of mbaru niang and no rooms. The function of this empty space was for sleeping, eating, and discussions.

The construction process of mbaru niang by the ancestors began with a traditional ceremony. After that, building materials were prepared from the surrounding forests of Waerebo to construct the seven houses. The building materials used include majegau wood, boards made of Indonesian mahogany wood, wooden blocks made of Bolly beech wood, and roofs made of lontar palm leaves and fibers. The roofs were built from the top downward until they almost touched the ground. The seven buildings were a form of respect for the seven-point directions from the seven mountain peaks surrounding Waerebo.

The old design of mbaru niang is considered the original form of mbaru gendang of the Manggarainese. Before the 1960s, the old design of mbaru niang was still commonly found in Manggarai. However, Manggarai people began to change the house style after that decade. Only mbaru niang, located in Todo and Wae Rebo, are preserved. However, the mbaru niang in Todo has undergone renovations several times. Meanwhile, part of the mbaru niang in Waerebo collapsed in the 1990s.

=== New design ===
In 2008, the Indonesian Architecture team noted that there were only four remaining mbaru niang in Wae Rebo. Meanwhile, according to the villagers, there were originally seven houses. The Indonesian Architecture team then conducted conservation efforts on the mbaru niang buildings. After the conservation efforts, the number of mbaru niang returned to seven. Each mbaru niang was given a name: Niang Gendang, Niang Gena Mandok, Niang Gena Jekong, Niang Gena Ndorom, Niang Gena Keto, Niang Gena Jintam, and Niang Gena Maro. Niang Gendang became a drum storage warehouse. The other mbaru niang belonged to each clan in Waerebo.

The mbaru niang was then constructed into six vertical levels. Each floor, from bottom to top, was named Ngaung, Tenda, Lobo, Lentar, Lempe Rae, and Hekang Code. Ngaung serves as the base of the mbaru niang building. Its function includes weaving, crafting, and storing gardening tools. Tenda is the first floor of the mbaru niang, serving as the main area for residents to conduct various activities. Next is Lobo, the second floor within the mbaru Niang, designated for storing food supplies. Lentar is the third floor inside the mbaru niang, functioning as storage when crop failure occurs. The fourth floor is Lempe Rae, exclusively used for seed storage. Meanwhile, the highest floor of the mbaru niang is called Hekang Code. Inside Hekang Code, there is only an ancestral altar. This floor is only used during building dedication ceremonies.

== Building technology ==
The mbaru niang uses traditional building technology based on binding methods rather than nails. Because it does not use nails, there is a lack of rigidity in the mbaru niang structures. This condition results in more flexible and resilient buildings that can withstand the shaking caused by earthquakes.

== Awards ==
Mbaru niang's traditional house is considered extremely rare because it is only found in Waerebo. Efforts to conserve mbaru niang received the highest recognition in the cultural heritage conservation category from UNESCO Asia Pacific in 2012 and became one of the candidates for the Aga Khan Award for Architecture in 2013.

== Bibliography ==
- Damayanti, Desak Putu (2020). Traditional House of Nusa Tenggara in Sketch (PDF). Translated by Putri, Pradwi Sukma Ayu. Jakarta: ed. PT Elex Media Komputindo. ISBN 978-623-00-1209-9. Archived from the original (PDF) on December 5, 2023.
- Indarwati, Lucia (2022). Mbaru Gendang, Rumah Adat Manggarai, Flores (PDF). Sleman: ed. Kanisius. ISBN 978-979-21-6651-4. Archived from the original (PDF) on June 6, 2023.
- Sari, Tika Novita; Pramesthi, Intania Ayu (2020). Arsitektur Hijau : Dahulu, Kini dan Nanti [Green architecture: past, present and future] (in Indonesian). Archived from the original on 2025-01-26.
- Widyawati, Fransiska (January 2021). "The Transformation of Mbaru Gendang from Communal-Cultural House to Cultural Building in Manggarai, Eastern Indonesia". Proceedings of the 1st International Conference on Education, Humanities, Health and Agriculture (ICEHHA), 3-4 June 2021, Ruteng, Flores, Indonesia.
