= Lamboya language =

Language spoken in Indonesia

Lamboya
- Native to: Indonesia
- Region: Sumba Island
- Native speakers: (25,000 cited 1997)
- Language family: Austronesian: Malayo-Polynesian; Central–Eastern; Sumba–Flores; Sumba–Hawu; Sumba; Wejewa–Lamboya; Lamboya

Language codes
- ISO 639-3: lmy
- Glottolog: lamb1273
- ELP: Laboya

Lamboya or Laboya is an Austronesian language spoken on Sumba, Indonesia. The population figure may include Gaura, which Ethnologue counts as a dialect of both Lamboya and Kodi.
