= Wejewa language =

Austronesian language spoken in Indonesia

Wejewa
- West Sumbanese
- Native to: Indonesia
- Region: Sumba Island
- Native speakers: (65,000 cited 1997–2011)
- Language family: Austronesian: Malayo-Polynesian; Central–Eastern; Sumba–Flores; Sumba–Hawu; Sumba; Wejewa–Lamboya; Wejewa
- Dialects: Weyewa proper; Loura; Tana Righu; Ve Luri; Wai Bangga; Loliina

Language codes
- ISO 639-3: Either: wew – Wejewa lur – Laura
- Glottolog: weje1237
- ELP: Weyewa

Wejewa (Weyewa, Wewewa) is an Austronesian language spoken on Sumba, Indonesia.

== Phonology ==
Consonants
	Labial	Alveolar	Palatal	Velar	Glottal
Plosive	p	t	(c)	k	ʔ
Prenasalized	ᵐb	ⁿd		ᵑg	
Implosive	ɓ	ɗ	(ʄ)	ɠ	
Fricative		s			
Nasal	m	n		ŋ	
Approximant	w	r, l	j		

- The phonemes /c ʄ/ are very rare, occurring in four words in total.

Vowels
	Front	Central	Back
High	i		u
Mid	e		o
Low		a	
