= Soemba Mission =

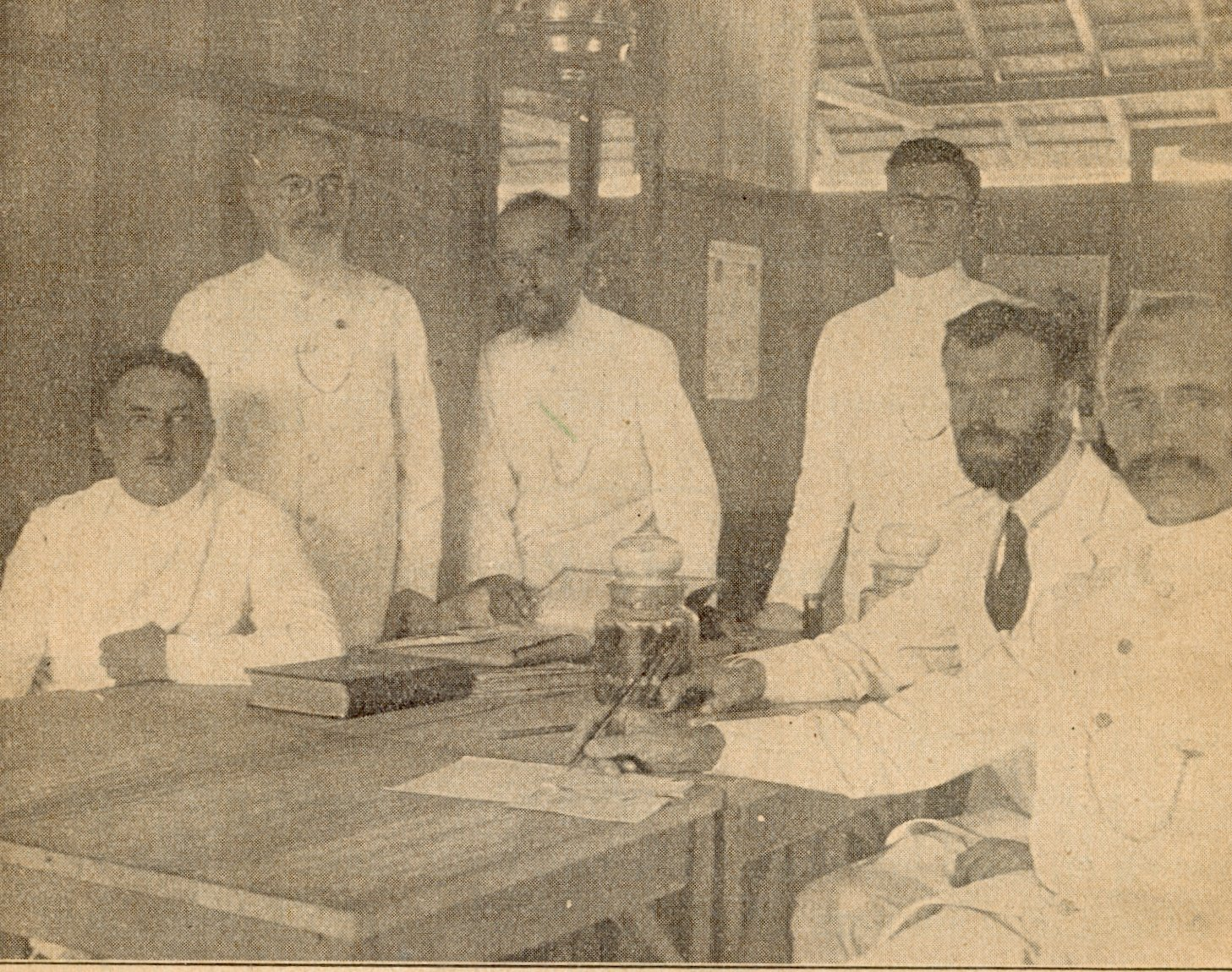
Missionaries on Soemba in 1926, l.t.r.: ds. L.P. Krijger, ds. C. de Bruijn, ds. Wiebe van Dijk, ds. J.P. Lambooy, T. Mobach and ds. J.F. Colenbrander

The Soemba Mission was a mission on the Indonesian island of Soemba, intended to convert the population to Christianity.

== Gallery ==
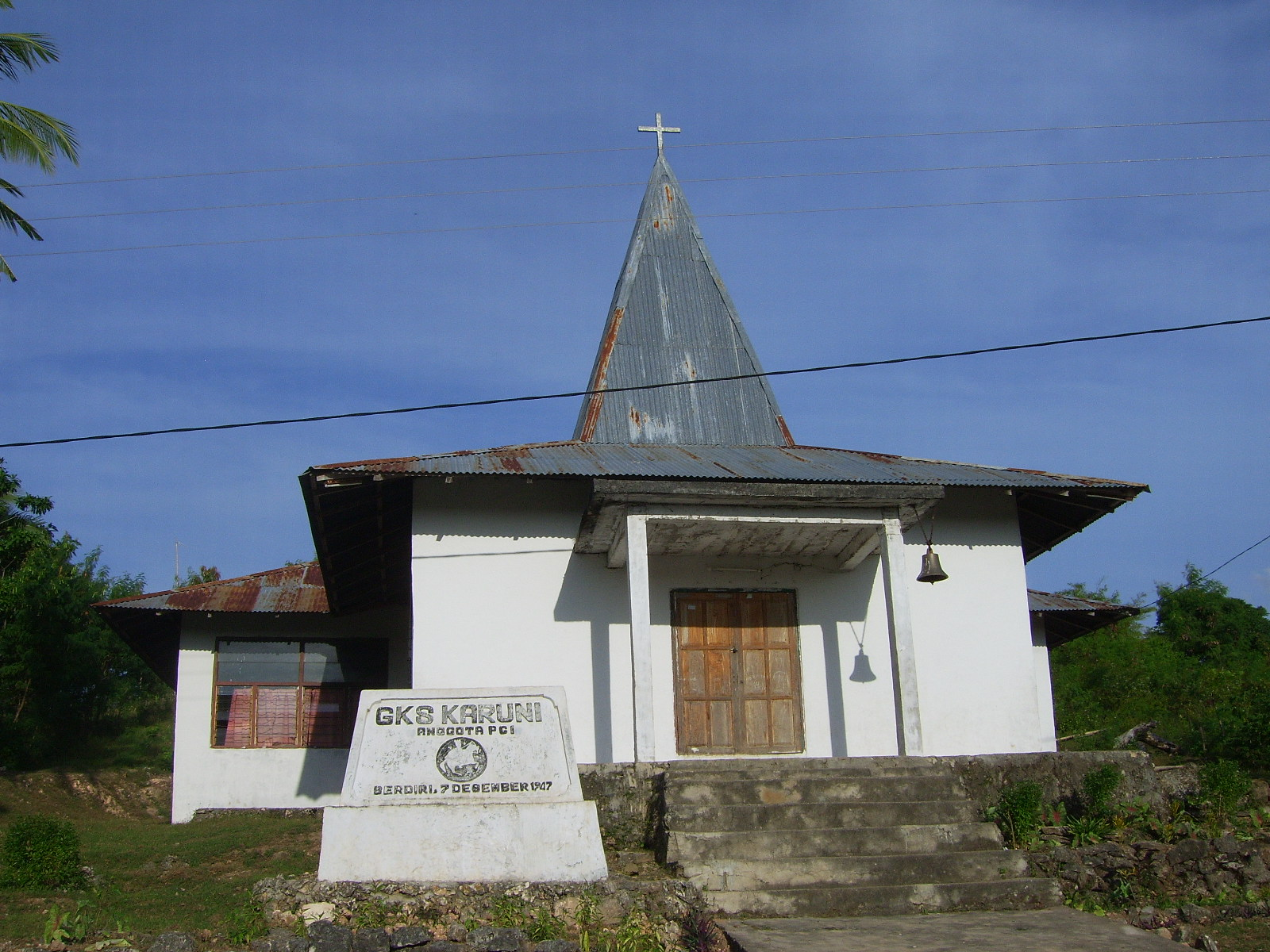
GKS church in Karuni West Sumba Regency, 2007

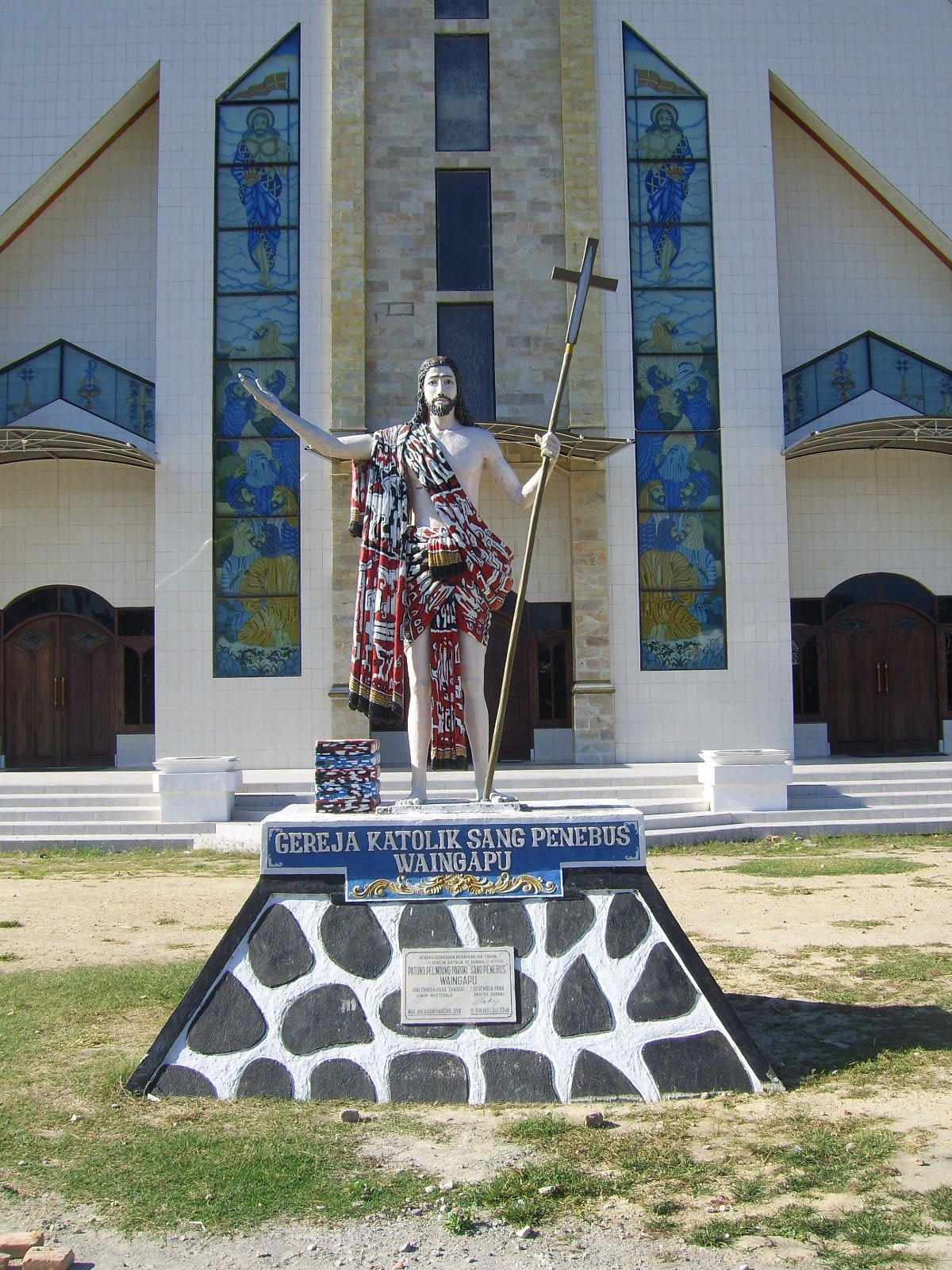
Catholic church in Waingapu, East Sumba Regency, 2007

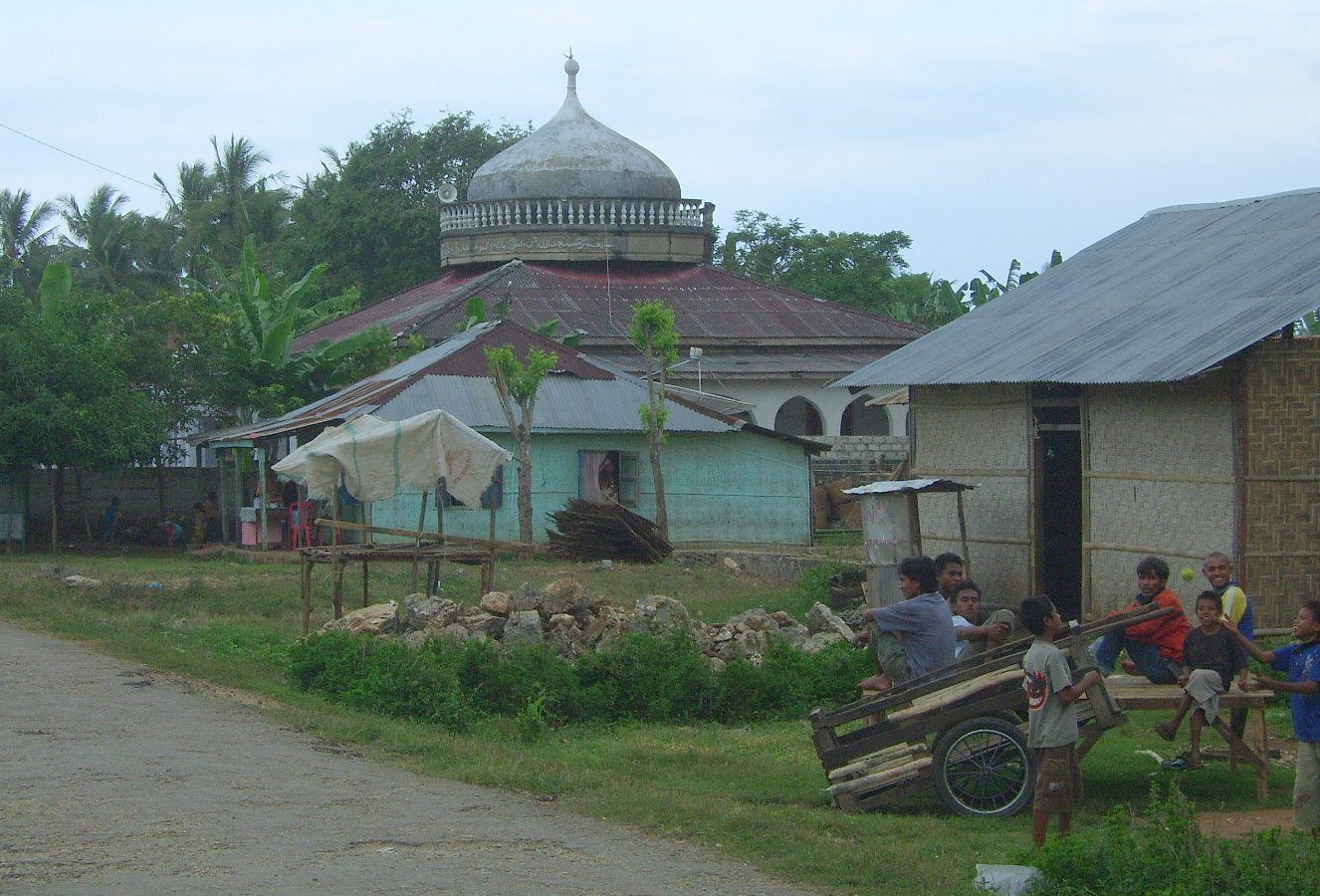
Mosque in Soemba, 2007

== Sources ==
- Tot dankbaarheid genoopt. Gedenkboek ter gelegenheid van den 25-jarigen Zendingsarbeid op Soemba. – J.H. Kok, Kampen – 1927.
- P.J. Lambooy – Sporen van oudere bevolking op Soemba – 1927
- S.J. Paul Goossens – Openbare scheurmaking op Soemba – Een aanklacht en een verweer – 1939 – Druk niet bestemd voor de handel, aanwezig in Universiteitsbibliotheek van de Rijksuniversiteit Groningen
- D.K. Wielenga – De zending op Soemba – Herzien en bijgewerkt door T. van Dijk en Ds. P.J. Luijendijk – Uitgegeven vanwege den Ned. Zendingsraad door Hoenderloo's Uitgeverij en Drukkerij, 1949.
- D.K. Wielenga – Soemba – Uitgegeven door den Zendingsraad-Studieraad, In den handel gebracht door de NV Algemeene boekhandel voor inwendige- en uitwendige zending te 's Gravenhage
- M.C. Capelle – D.s. D.K. Wielenga, grondlegger der zending onder de Soembanezen – serie: Lichtstralen op de akker der wereld nr 3 – uitgegeven door J.N. Voorhoeve, Den Haag – 1952
- J.D. Wielenga – Weerzien op Soemba, fragmenten uit een dagboek – Libellen-serie No. 65/66 – Bosch & Keuning, Baarn
- Cultuur als antwoord, verzamelde opstellen van prof. dr. L. Onvlee, uitgegeven ter gelegenheid van zijn tachtigste verjaardag, 23 November 1973, Den Haag, Martinus Nijhoff
- Th. van den End, Gereformeerde Zending op Sumba (1859–1972). 1987
- W.B. van Halsema – De zending voorbij – Kok, Kampen – 1995
- Mondelinge overlevering door Kuno van Dijk aan W.K. van Dijk Jr.
