= Kambera language =

Austronesian language spoken in Indonesia

Kambera
- East Sumbanese
- Native to: Indonesia
- Region: Lesser Sunda Islands
- Native speakers: 240,000 (2009)
- Language family: Austronesian: Malayo-Polynesian; Central–Eastern; Sumba–Flores ?; Sumba–Hawu; Sumba; East Sumbanese; Kambera

Language codes
- ISO 639-3: xbr
- Glottolog: kamb1299

Kambera, also known as East Sumbanese, is a Malayo-Polynesian language spoken in the eastern half of Sumba Island in the Lesser Sunda Islands, Indonesia. Kambera is a member of Bima-Sumba subgrouping within Central Malayo-Polynesian inside Malayo-Polynesian. The island of Sumba, located in Eastern Indonesia, has an area of 11,243.78 km^{2}. The name Kambera comes from a traditional region which is close to the town of Waingapu in East Sumba Regency. Because of export trades which concentrated in Waingapu in the 19th century, the language of the Kambera region has become the bridging language in eastern Sumba.

== Phonology ==
=== Vowels ===
	Front	Back
High	i iː	u uː
Mid	e ai	o au
Low	a, aː	

The diphthongs /ai/ and /au/ function phonologically as the long counterparts to /e/ and /o/, respectively.

=== Consonants ===
		Bilabial	Alveolar	Palatal	Velar	Glottal
Nasal		m	n		ŋ	
Plosive/ Affricate	plain	p	t	dʒ	k	
Plosive/ Affricate	prenasalized	ᵐb	ⁿd	ᶮdʒ	ᵑɡ	
Plosive/ Affricate	implosive	ɓ	ɗ			
Fricative						h
Lateral			l			
Rhotic			r			
Semivowel	plain	w		j		
Semivowel	prenasalized			ᶮj		

Kambera formerly had /s/, but a sound change occurring around the turn of the 20th century replaced all occurrences of former /s/ with /h/.

== Morpho-syntax ==
=== Negation ===
Negators are used in Kambera, and other languages, to make a clause or sentence negative in meaning. Kambera has several types of negators. There are six main types of negators listed below.

Negators	English translation
nda	negation
ndia	emphatic negation
ndedi	'not yet'
àmbu	'won't, don't' (irrealis negation)
àmbu...ndoku	'won't/don't...at all'
nda...ndoku	'not...at all'

Ndia 'no' is used for general negation, and nda 'negative' or ndedi 'not yet' are predicate negators. Ndoku is used to emphasise the negation by being placed with the negator àmbu or nda.

Ambu bobar ndoku -ma -ya!
NEG.IRR preach NEG.EMP -EMP -3SG.ACC.EMP
'Do not talk about it at all!'

Àmbu is used to express future negation, as well as negation in imperatives.

Àmbu katuda=kau nàhu!
NEG.IRR sleep=2SG.ACC now
'Don't go to sleep now!'

Negators are elements in a clause that are deictic. They can be used to refer to time, space and discourse. Shown below, the negator, ndia, is used to refer to discourse.

Ndia ná!
NEG DEI
'No!' (not like that)

Two of these negators, nda and àmbu – with nda being a general negator, are used for nominal and verbal predicates.

Nda ningu ndoku
NEG be NEG.EMP
'There are none at all.'

==== Negators into verbs ====
The word pa in Kambera is derivational and can be added to few prepositional nouns, numerals and negators to create verbs. The emphatic negator ndia 'no' can become a verb through pa derivation. The translation of this verb then becomes 'to deny'.

Example below of how ndia is constructed into a verb in a given phrase:

na- pa.ndia -ya ba nda na- njala
3SG.NOM- pa.no -3SG.ACC.EMP CNJ NEG 3SG.NOM {be/do wrong}
'He denied that he did wrong.'

==== Noun phrases ====
A nuclear clause has the predicate as the head in Kambera, and modifiers are positioned at the beginning of the clause. As nda is a modifier it is placed at the beginning of a clause, as a clause-initial negator, before the verb and the rest of the elements of a nuclear clause.

You can distinguish nominal clauses from NPs is through the irrealis negator àmbu and the negator nda, which both never occur inside a possessed NP.

==== Clitics ====
The Kambera word nda is also considered to be a pro-clitic as well, as they do not conform to the minimal word requirement and must occur with a syntactic/phonological host. A clitic is a type of bound morpheme which is syntactically free, but are phonologically bound morphemes. They can attach themselves to a stem, for example the negator nda. Nda appears before its host and is used to mark negation. It has a very simple phonotactic properties and cannot carry stress. Nda as a clitic can only ever occur with a host.

Ka 'nggiki hi nda =u- 'ita -ka?
CNJ why CNJ NEG 2PL.PN- see -1SG.ACC.EMP
'Why didn't you see me?'

In the example above, the negator nda becomes nda u- [ndaw], with nda attaching itself to the allomorph u-. Nda is a proclitic that marks an embedded clause in Kambera.

=== Relative clauses ===
Negators are also included in relative clauses, but are not a part of the noun phrase.

[Nda [ndui pa- bohu]_{NP}] -ya
NEG money RmO- steal -3SG.ACC.EMP
'It (is) not stolen money.'

=== Pronouns and person markers ===
Personal pronouns are used in Kambera for emphasis/disambiguation; the syntactic relation between full pronouns and clitics is similar to that between NPs and clitics. NPs and pronouns have morphological case.

Personal Pronouns
		Singular	Plural
1st person	exclusive	nyungga	nyuma
1st person	inclusive	nyungga	nyuta
2nd person		nyumu	nyimi
3rd person		nyuna	nyuda

Kambera, as a head-marking language, has rich morpho-syntactic marking on its predicators. The pronominal, aspectual, and/or mood clitics together with the predicate constitute the nuclear clause. Definite verbal arguments are crossreferenced on the predicate for person, number, and case (Nominative (N), Genitive (G), Dative (D), Accusative (A)). The four main pronominal clitic paradigms are given below.

	Nominative	Genitive	Accusative	Dative
1SG	ku-	-nggu	-ka	-ngga
2SG	(m)u-	-mu	-kau	-nggau
3SG	na-	-na	-ya	-nya
1PL.INC	ta-	-nda	ta-	-nda
1PL.EXC	ma-	-ma	-kama	-nggama
2PL	(m)i-	-mi	-ka(m)i	-ngga(m)i
3PL	da-	-da	-ha	-nja

Examples:

apu-nggu
granny-1SG.GEN
'My granny.'

ana-na
child-3SG.GEN
'His child.'

Kau pa.ta.lunggur-ya na wihi-na
scratch {CAU.be sore} ART leg-3SG.GEN
'He scratched his leg sore.' (lit. 'He scratched and caused his leg to be sore')

Na-tari-bia nahu angu-na
3SG.NOM-watch-MOD now companion-3SG.GEN
'He just watches his companion.'

Ningu uma-nggua
be.here house-1SG.GEN
'I have a house.' (lit. 'Here is a house of mine.')

Nyuda-ha-ka nahu da ana-nda
they-3PL.ACC-PRF now ART child-1PL.GEN
'They are our children now.'

The items in the table below mark person and number of the subject when the clause has continuative aspect.

		Singular	Plural
1st person	exclusive	-nggunya	-manya
1st person	inclusive	-nggunya	-ndanya
2nd person		-munya	-minya
3rd person		-nanya	-danya

Examples:

Lunggur-nanya na Ihi-na
scratch-3SG.CONT ART body-3SG.GEN
'He is scratching his body.'

"Laku-nnguya ina", wa-na
go-1SG.CONT mother say-3SG
"'I am going, mother,' he said."

=== Possession ===
Kambera has a possessive or reflexive noun wiki 'self/own', which can be used to mark possession (1).

Uma wiki -nggu
house self/own -1SG.GEN
'My own house'

Wiki has the structural properties of a noun and can be used as a nominal modifier (compare 2 and 3), unlike pronouns which must be cross-referenced on the noun with a genitive clitic (3).

Uma witu -nggu
house grass -1SG.GEN
'My hut'

Uma -nggu nyungga
house -1SG.GEN I
'My house'

As (3) is a possessed noun phrase, the enclitic attaches to the noun. In possessed and modified noun phrases, the genitive enclitic attaches to the noun modifier (4).

Na uma 'bakul -nggu
ART house {be big} -1SG.GEN
'My big house'

In Kambera, where cross-referencing is used, the noun phrase is optional. A verb along with its pronominal markers constitutes a complete sentence. Pronominal clitics are a morphological way of expressing relationships between syntactic constituents such as a noun and its possessor.

==== Possessor relativisation ====
Possessors can be relativised with a ma- relative clause. There are three types of clauses used in the relativisation of possessors.

The first is when the embedded verb is derived from a relational noun such as mother or child. These derived transitive verbs express relations between the subject and the object (5).

Na anakeda [na ma- ina -nya]
ART child [ART RmS- mother -3SG.DAT]
'the child whose mother she is'/'the child she is the mother of'

The second clause type is where the possessor is the head of the ma- relative clause and the possessee is the subject of the embedded verb (6).

Ita -nggu -nya [na tau na ma-meti {kuru uma} -na]
See -1SG.GEN -3SG.DAT [ART person ART RmS-die wife -3SG.GEN]
'I saw [the man whose wife died]

The final type is where the relative clause contains the verb ningu 'be' and the incorporated argument of this verb. The head of the relative construction is the possessor (7).

Na tau na ma- ningu ihi woka .ng
ART person ART RmS- be content garden .ng
'the person that has crops' (lit. 'the person whose garden content is')

Normally, the possessor pronoun nyuna 'he/she' follows the possessed noun (8), though it can also be the head of a relativised clause (9).

Na marihak [na kalembi -na nyuna]
ART {be dirty} [ART shirt -3SG.GEN he]
'His shirt is dirty'

Nyuna na [ma- marihak na kalembi -na
He ART RmS- {be dirty} ART shirt -3SG.GEN
'He whose shirt is dirty'

Possessors can also be relativised in the same way as subjects. For example, in the following headless relative clause (no possessor NP is present), a definite article is present (10).

Na ma- rabih karaha kalai -na
ART RmS- trickle side left -3SG.GEN
'The (one) whose left side trickles (i.e. lets water through)' (mythological character that is the source of rain)

== Abbreviations ==
Gloss	Meaning
NEG.irr	irrealis negator
NEG.emp	emphatic negator
EMP	emphasis marker
2s	2nd person singular
ACC	accusative
DEI	deictic element (space/time)
3sN	3rd person singular nominative
3sA	3rd person accusative singular emphatic pronoun
CNJ	conjunction
2pN	2nd person singular pronoun
1sA	1st person accusative singular emphatic pronoun
RmO	object relative clause marker

== Bibliography ==
- Klamer, Marian (1998). A Grammar of Kambera. Berlin/New York: Mouton de Gruyter. ISBN 3-11-016187-7.
- Klamer, Marian (2005). "Kambera". In Adelaar, Karl Alexander; Himmelmann, Nikolaus (eds.). The Austronesian Languages of Asia and Madagascar. London: Routledge. ISBN 0-7007-1286-0.
