= Wanukaka language =

Austronesian language

Wanukaka
- Native to: Indonesia
- Region: Lesser Sunda Islands
- Native speakers: (10,000 cited 1981)
- Language family: Austronesian: Malayo-Polynesian; Central–Eastern; Sumba–Flores ?; Sumba–Hawu; Sumba; Central; Wanukaka
- Dialects: Rua; Wanukaka

Language codes
- ISO 639-3: wnk
- Glottolog: wanu1241
- ELP: Wanukaka

The Wanukaka language is an Austronesian language spoken on Sumba, Indonesia.
