= Klasop River =

Klasop Klasof
- The Klasop and Klasagun estuary

Location
- Country: Indonesia
- Province: Southwest Papua
- Regency: Sorong

Physical characteristics
- Mouth: Segun Bay
  - coordinates: 1.417088°S 131.319086°E

The Klasop or Klasof is a river in the northwest of the Bird's Head Peninsula of New Guinea. Its course generally runs in a southerly direction, and it flows into the bay of Segun, in a large estuary that is connected to that of the Klasagun River to the west. The large island of Jemur separates the two estuaries. The stream of Klawaralim is a left tributary in the upper reach, while in the lower reaches Klasop is joined by a number of right-hand tributaries, including Klamer and Klasafet. For much of its length, Klasop is surrounded by mangrove forests.

== See also ==
- List of drainage basins of Indonesia
- List of rivers of Indonesia

== Sources ==
- Indonesia, Kasim, Series: JOG 1501, Sheet SA 52-8, 1968, 1:250 000 (Map).
