= Kodi language =

Austronesian language spoken in Indonesia

Kodi
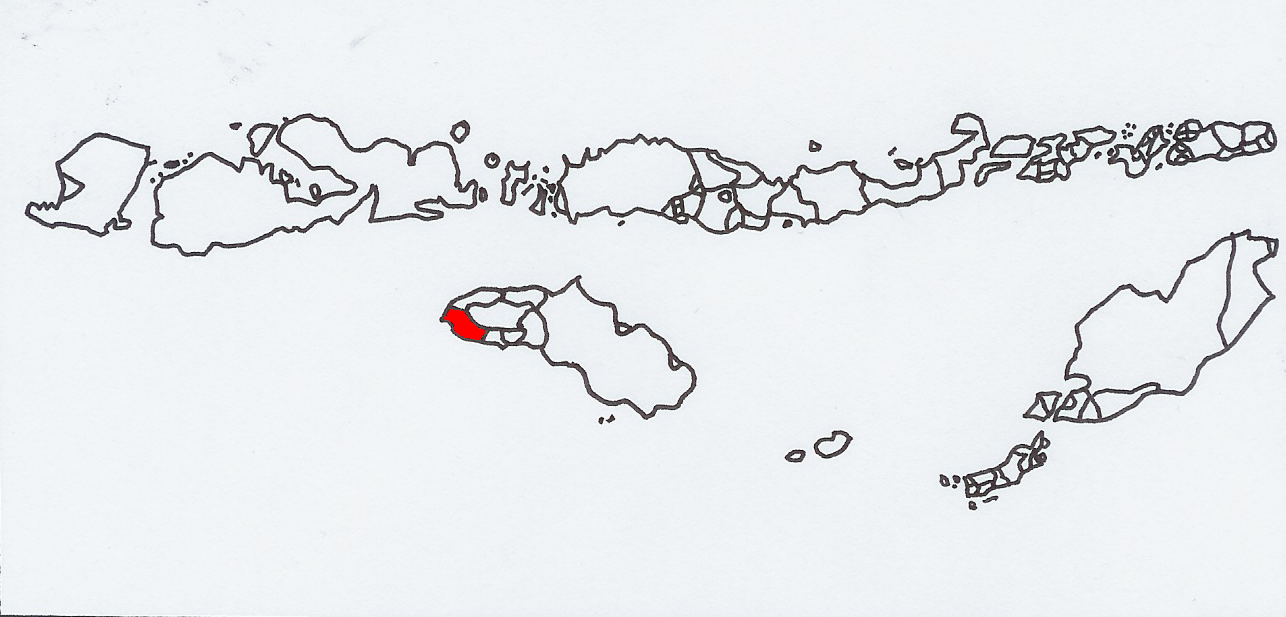
- The Nusa Tenggara Timur province
- Native to: Indonesia
- Region: Sumba Island
- Native speakers: (undated figure of 20,000)
- Language family: Austronesian: Malayo-Polynesian; Central–Eastern; Sumba–Flores; Sumba–Hawu; Sumba; Kodi–Gaura; Kodi

Language codes
- ISO 639-3: kod
- Glottolog: kodi1247

Kodi is a Sumba language of Indonesia. The population figure may include Gaura, which Ethnologue counts as a dialect of both the Lamboya and Kodi languages. Kodi is an Austronesian language that is mainly spoken in Nusa Tenggara Timur province, the western part of the island of Sumba in eastern Indonesia. An alternate name for Kodi is Kudi and dialects of the language include Kodi Bokol, Kodi Bangedo, Nggaro (Nggaura) and is most alike to Wejewa. With only approximately 20,000 speakers, the Kodi language is an endangered language.

== Classification ==
Austronesian, Malayo-Polynesian, Central-Eastern Malayo-Polynesian, Sumba-Hawu, Sumba, Kodi-Gaura.

== History ==
The Kodi language is derived from the Melanesian and Austronesian languages since its inhabitants arrived in Sumba in the 1500s. The Kodi society can be described as "isolated from history" since being colonized by the Dutch empire during the 1800s. The Kodi people live remotely in West Sumba located in Eastern Indonesia without a political leader.

== Geographic distribution ==
Kodi is spoken in Nusa Tenggara Timur Province; west Sumba located in Eastern Indonesia.

== Dialects/varieties ==
Kodi has a population of approximately 20,000 speakers. Other known names and dialects of Kodi include: Kodi Bangedo, Kodi Bokol, Kudi, Nggaro, and Nggaura. May be most similar to Wejewa.

== Phonology ==
Consonants
	Labial	Alveolar	Palatal	Velar	Glottal
Plosive	p	t	tʃ	k	ʔ
Prenasalized	ᵐb	ⁿd	ⁿdʒ	ᵑg	
Implosive	ɓ	ɗ		ɠ	
Fricative		s			h
Nasal	m	n		ŋ	
Approximant	w	r, l	j		

Vowels
	Front	Central	Back
High	i		u
Mid	e		o
Low		a	

== Sound system ==
Global Recordings Network has a short biblical story spoken in the Kodi language.

== Vocabulary ==
habali a mekena – 'returning the honor'

ngara – 'renown' (lit. 'name')

meke – 'honor'

witti wyulla – 'the feet of the moon'

limya lodo – 'the hand of the sun'
