= Waerebo =

Indonesian village on Flores island

- Wae Rebo in the morning

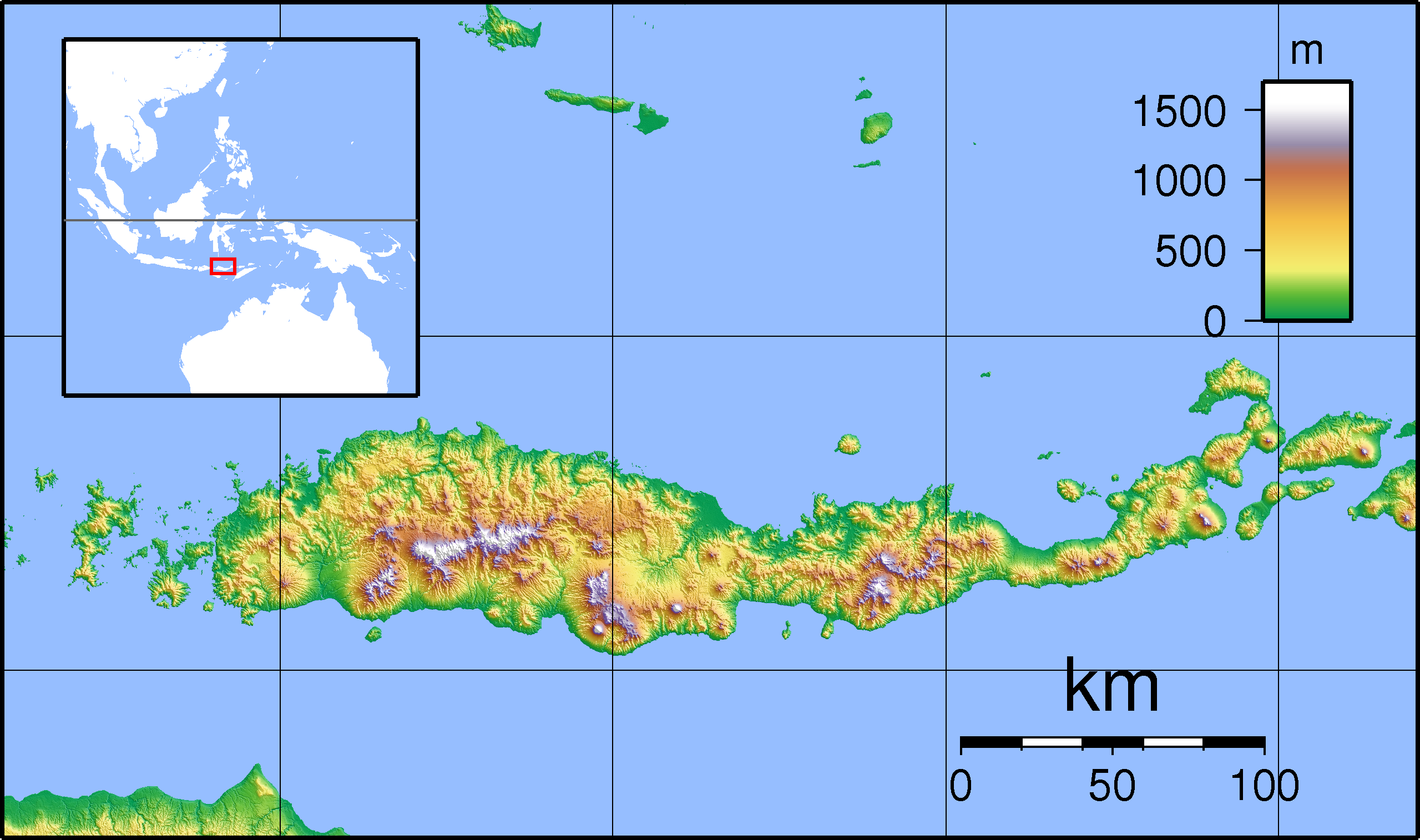
- Location in East Nusa Tenggara and Indonesia Waerebo (Lesser Sunda Islands) Waerebo (Indonesia)
- Coordinates: 8°46′12″S 120°17′3″E
- Country: Indonesia
- Province: East Nusa Tenggara
- Regency: Manggarai Regency
- District: West Satar Mese District
- Elevation: 3,900 ft (1,200 m)
- Time zone: UTC+8 (Indonesia Central Standard Time)

Waerebo or Wae Rebo is a village situated in the Manggarai Regency, East Nusa Tenggara. Located at 1,200 meters above sea level, the village is composed of 7 main houses, known as mbaru niang. In 2012, it was given Cultural Heritage Conservation status by UNESCO Asia Pacific. It is one of the cultural tourism destinations in Manggarai Regency, Indonesia.

== History ==
The village was inhabited for 19 generations, then abandoned. In 1920, the current buildings were constructed and the village re-inhabited.

According to the local legend, their ancestors were from Minangkabau. Led by Empo Maro, they sailed from Sumatra to Labuan Bajo. Empo Maro fled his village because he was slandered and wanted to be killed. Then he wandered to several cities. First, he stopped in Gowa and then moved to several other cities. During his travels, Maro found a wife and then he invited his wife to move with him. One night, Maro dreamed of meeting a wise person who spoke to Maro to settle and thrive in Wae Rebo. Maro followed what the wise person said and he and his wife searched for Wae Rebo. After arriving in Wae Rebo, Maro and his wife lived and settled there.

The development of Wae Rebo as a tourism destination was started by the local government in 1997.

== Administrative territory ==
The village is in the administrative territory of the village of Satar Lenda (desa), in the West Satar Mese (Satar Mese Barat) district, Manggarai regency, East Nusa Tenggara province.

== Access ==
Accessibility to Waerebo has been significantly improved. In 2006, driving from Labuan Bajo to Dintor took 6.5 hours and the walk from there to the village was an arduous 6 hour-trek, including 4 hours in the forest. Since then, repairs to roads and bridges connecting Kombo and Nangalili have shortened the road from Labuan Bajo to 3.5 hours. In 2013 the path through the forest has undergone 2 changes; as of 2022 it is 4.5 km, more gentle and takes 2.5 to 3 hours.

== Lifestyle and social life ==
Apart from Wae Rebo's beauty and nature, the village attracts tourists for its lifestyle and social life.

=== Village organisation ===
The village includes seven traditional houses or Mbaru Niang, corresponding to the seven mountain peaks that surround the village, which are honoured as protectors of the prosperity of the kampong. The seven houses are set in an open circle centered on the village compang, a round altar platform made of rammed earth and stone. It is sacred and is a place for worship for ceremonies to god and ancestors.
The houses have names. These are, clockwise: Niang Gena Mandok, Niang Gena Jekong, Niang Gena Ndorom, Niang Gendang, Niang Gena Pirung, Niang Gena Jintam, and Niang Gena Maro. Each house is inhabited by 6 families, except for the Niang Gendang (main house) which is inhabited by 8 families. Thus 44 families live in the village. But nowadays not all the villagers live full time in the village.

There is also a kitchen hut for the whole village, and a typical gift shop.

=== The houses ===
The houses or mbaru niang are entirely covered with lontar thatch. They have five levels, each assigned to a specific purpose. The first level, called lutur or tent, is the extended family's living quarters. The second level, called lobo, is used as an attic where food and goods are stored. The third level, called lentar, is for storing seeds for the next harvest. The fourth level, called lempa rae, is where extra food stocks are kept in case of drought. The fifth level, called hekang kode, is used for making offerings to the ancestors and is the most sacred level in the house.

=== Water ===
The village's water comes from springs in the mountains. These springs are called sosor, which are divided into two types: male sosor and female sosor.

=== Agriculture, farming and other activities ===
Wae Rebo residents still maintain a lifestyle in accordance with the culture and traditions handed down by their ancestors.

Agriculture is the main livelihood. It includes coffee, cloves, and tubers. This takes place in the surrounding hillsides. The village is self-sufficient for vegetables. Coffee (two types: arabica and robusta) is the main cash crop, as the 1200 m altitude means that it gets the right temperature for proper growth. The villagers grow, dry and roast the coffee beans and once a week carry out the beans to be sold at the main market in Dintor.

Raising chickens has been stepped up to meet the high demand for eggs to be served to visitors.

The women' activities are cooking, childcare, weaving, assisting men in the fields, and these days they also take care of the visitors' lodgings and food (see "Tourism administration and organisation" below).

=== Ceremonies ===
The Wailu'u ritual or welcoming ritual is performed upon each visitor's arrival (see "Visitors reception" below).

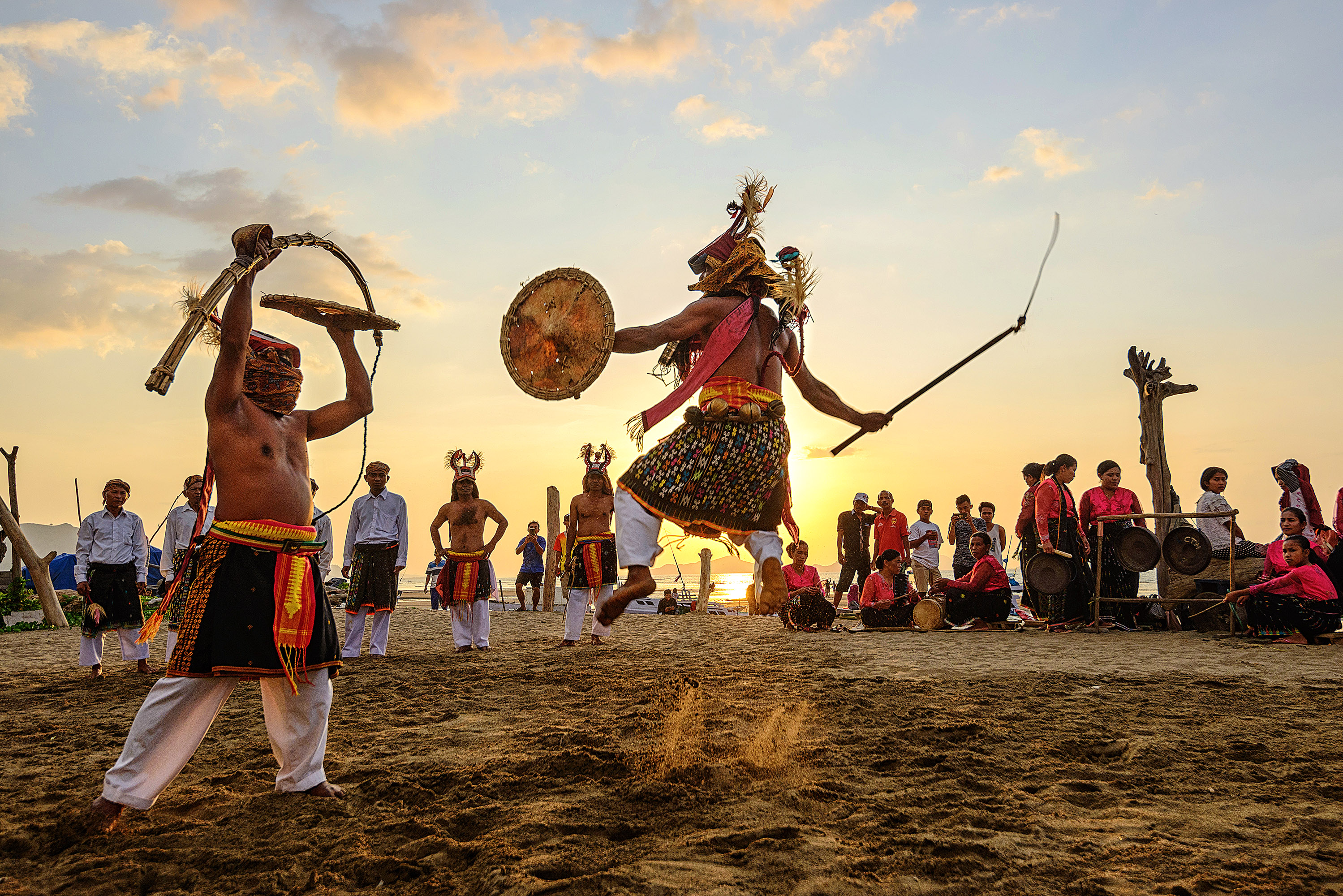
Caci fight-danse

The Penti ceremony is carried out once a year in November. It is meant as a thanking for the year's harvest and a prayer for prosperity and health in the coming year. Beyond the villagers themselves, it also involves their neighbours and those living outside the village. The ceremony takes place in three locations. It starts at 6 a.m. at the springs, the beginning of life, asking for these to be blessed. Then it proceeds to the village's front porch, where prayers are said for women whose husbands live outside the village, and for the village to be guarded against evil spirits. The last location is in the backyard, where the community prays for prosperity and health for the whole village, and for good crops.
It is one of the most popular ceremonies for tourists, as it includes traditional Caci dances and traditional songs.

=== Schooling ===
When children reach school age (seven y.o.), their families move to Dintor or Denge. Once a month, a teacher spends two days in the villages teaching English; this gives the villagers a smattering of English and allows them to chat with their foreign visitors.

== Tourism administration and organisation ==
Tourism in Waerebo is managed by an institution formed in 2006 based on a community agreement. Initially called the Waerebo Tourism Institute (LPW), it was renamed Waerebo Cultural Conservation Institute (LPBW) in 2010.

From the beginning of the tourism venture, a basic precautionary principle was set: that the villagers' income from their main livelihood is to be maintained, and that tourism be seen as a secondary activity from which the community can receive additional income — even if the income from tourism can in some cases be higher than the income from the main activities. This is because tourism depends on external factors such as natural disasters, climate change, social conflicts, and infectious diseases. The COVID-19 pandemic unambiguously demonstrated that this choice was the right path, as during this episode the villagers were still able to receive income from their plantations, even though income from tourism had stopped.

The LPBW assigns a daily manager who coordinates guest services at the guest house. The manager informs the visitors about what they can and cannot do during their visit at the village; reads out the tourist code of ethics that has been prepared conjointly with the villagers; ensures the comfort of the visitors and responds to their complaints.

Daily service for guests are provided for by 5 women groups in rotation, with three groups of 8 women and 2 groups of 9 women, for a total number of 42 women involved. These five groups take turns every day to provide meals, lodging and general assistance. This system allows for every woman directly involved in tourism activities to spend only 1 or 2 days a week for tourism, and the rest of the time each of them can focus on their main livelihood. Two goals are thus met: maintaining the economic resilience of the village, increasing the number of people who receive benefits from tourism. The more people involved, the stronger the resilience of the tourism business.

=== Visitors reception ===
New arrivals are announced from outside the village by ‘clacking’ two halves of a bamboo pole together (pentungan) that hang from a rope next to the path a few times. Then the visitors wait for the answering signal, which is the same sound coming from the village below; this means that the announced arrival has been accepted, and the visitors can then proceed to enter the village and meet a village elder.

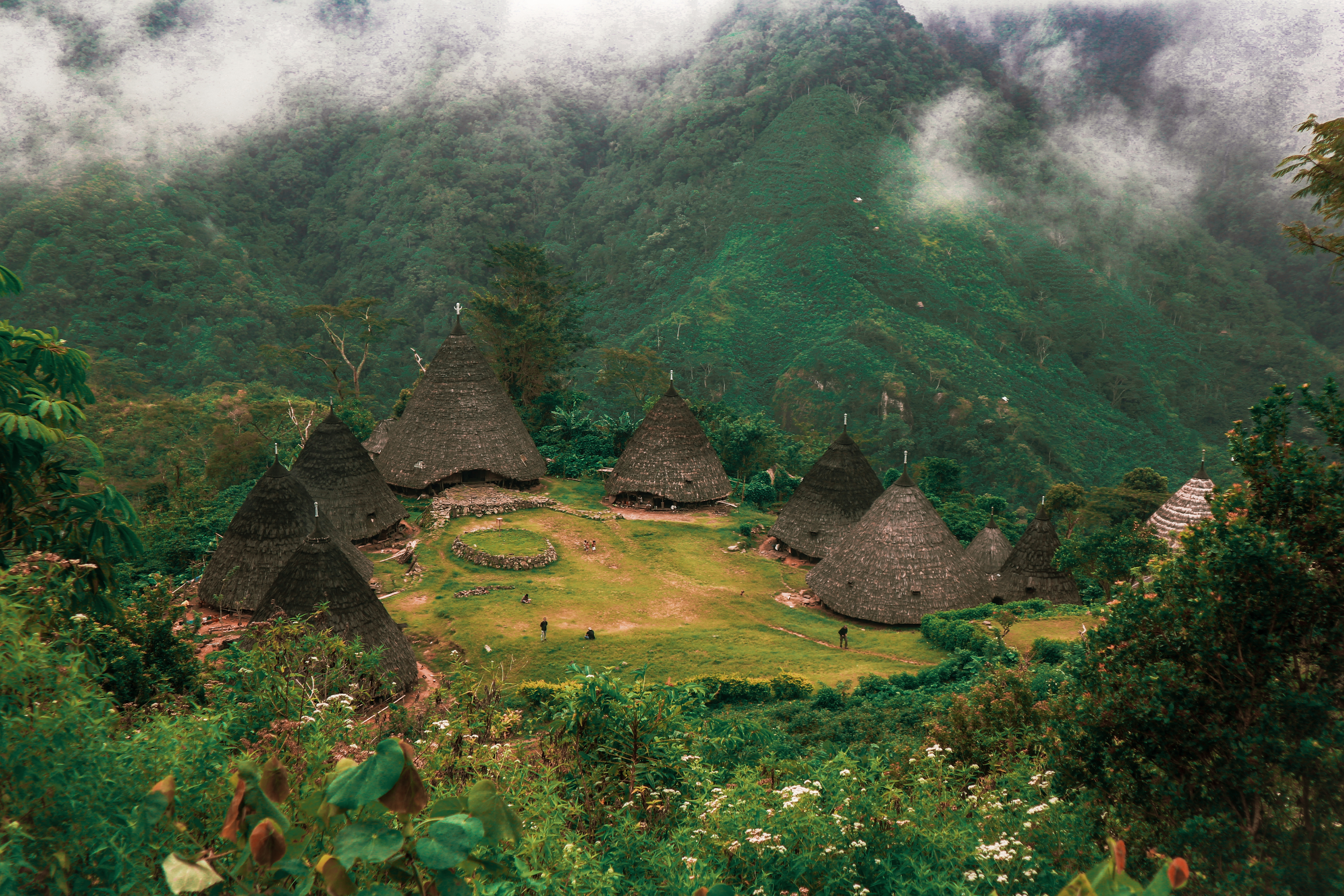
On the right, the 2 sleeping quarters for guests.

All visitors are received according to the Waerebo custom, which imperatively starts with a welcoming ritual (Wailu'u ritual) — visitors are not allowed to do any activities at the village prior to this ritual. This ritual allows for the visitors to pay their respects to the ancestors and corresponds to a formal acceptance as guests of the village, both by the community and the ancestors represented by village elders. The Waelu’u ritual takes 5 to 7 minutes. Once this done, the visitors are allowed to visit people's homes and take photos interact and share stories.

Tourists stay overnight at one of the two guest houses, and the daily manager arranges where they will sleep. These houses, which can each accommodate around 50 people, are set up as dormitories in a communal bedroom with mattresses, handwoven pandanus covers and blankets. The women groups are in charge of maintaining them clean, including washing blankets, pillowcases, etc.

One hut serves as kitchen for the whole village; a group of women occupies it all day, preparing dinner for the village. Dinners are served to visitors in their sleeping quarters, and visitors eat together with the days' group members. If there is only one visitor, the daily manager also eats together with that day's group.

=== Selling home-made products ===
Each group of women can offer for sale their productions or their family's productions (weaving products, handicrafts, coffee, chips, etc.) on the day they are on duty. Only products from the assigned group and families can be offered to tourists on that particular day. This arrangement allows each group to have similar opportunities to sell their homemade products.

=== Marketing success ===
The first marketing was made by Indecon, with flyers, posters and mentions on the internet (wonderfulflores.com). Then in 2012 Waerebo was listed by UNESCO as World heritage, a very serious push marketing-wise, (Note: The listing of a site as world heritage brings some 100,000 more visitors per year — at least for those that do not entail a 3-mile trek on foot. Even for those, that listing will bring a notable increase in the flux of visitors and this has without a doubt played a major part in the steady increase of visitors that Waerebo has seen since 2013.) and shortly after by the mid-2010s national television coverage started in earnest. The latter certainly played a role in the reversing of visitors' origins in 2016: that year, the number of nationals visiting Wae Rebo overcame that of foreign visitors for the first time, and that trend has continued since then. But the most efficient marketing tool of all has been the online reviews from previous visitors in travelers sites such as TripAdvisor and in social media.
As a result of these combined causes, the number of visitors near doubled from 2013 (1,136 visits) to 2014 (2,061 visits), increased again in 2015 (2,741 visits), almost doubled again in 2016 (5,090 visits) and reached a landing with an average around 7,800 visits in the three years 2017 to 2019. These three years are also the time when the Ministry of Tourism, Regency and Provincial Governments, produced many promotional materials, but the effects of these were more or less entirely nullified by the Covid pandemic that shut the whole world down for near-two years. Waerebo was closed from March 16, 2020, to October 2021, and its people survived thanks to their farming.

The more popular Waerebo is as a tourism destination, the greater the challenges are faced by the community.

=== Increased income and its distribution ===
All these tourists bring cash in; remains to see how much and who gets the benefit from it. In 2017, the Waerebo Cultural Conservation Institute (LPBW) earned Rp. 2,251,075,000. (Note: Rp. 2,251,075,000 is the sum given in the annual report of the Waerebo Cultural Conservation Institute (LPBW). It corresponds to US$ 157,400, with an exchange rate of 1 U$D equal to Rp. 14,300. Rp. 645,695,000 correspond to US$ 45,153.) This does not include the income from the sales of souvenirs and food-based products to tourists by the members of the coffee, weaving and chips group, which reached Rp. 645,695,000 and represent a considerable increase in income.

The repartition of these funds (how they are used) is entirely dependent on the agreement between the LPBW, the community leaders and the customary leaders. It varies each year, depending on the needs of the moment. In 2017 it was distributed as such: 48% as profits; 28% for meals; 11% for building works; 5% for the ceremony of harvest; 3% for operational costs of LPBW; 2% for elderly allowances; 1% for education fund; 1% for contribution to education; 0.3% for contribution to the living environment. Economic benefits were divided between direct beneficiaries, which include management and members of LPBW such as the cooking group, chips group, coffee group, chicken group, weaving group, handicraft group, local guides and porters; and indirect beneficiaries, which consist of people around the village such as accommodation owners in other villages, motorcycle taxis, market traders, farmers, etc.

Wae Rebo's success also spills out unto its surroundings, such as accommodation owners in other villages, motorcycle taxis, market traders, farmers, etc.

== Outside support ==
The Waerebo community found it difficult to maintain their traditional houses. This high costs need could not be met with the sole income from cash crops (coffee, cinnamon and corn plantations): climate change had affected the yield of coffee beans and their production fluctuated sharply every year. The cost of children education was another high concern.
In 2006, the community appealed for help from the Indonesian Ecotourism Foundation (Indecon). This fundation then started to provide considerable assistance in tourism planning, capacity building, institutional strengthening, and development of tourism management systems — all of which requiring training. (Note: As a participatory approach, the community was involved at all stages, from planning, implementing, and evaluating activities. Indecon assigned members of its staff as facilitators to live with the community during the mentoring process. Training sessions for each stage and different topics of activity were carried out, with exercises by the community and mentored by the facilitator. Experts from Indecon and from Indecon partner institutions were involved in the training. The training focused on simple activities which could add value to tourists experience: telling stories about customs and people's daily lives, visiting community coffee plantations, involving the visitors in meals preparation or in craft-making. It also involved bookkeeping and administration, complaints and conflicts management, meals preparation, room maintenance and bathroom cleaning, porter service, packaging of food-based products such as coffee or taro chips for direct sale to the visitors. Further approaches concerned the improvement of the food services, such as including herbal drinks and new food varieties; the improvement of guiding technique for tour packages; the introduction of new handicrafts such as bracelets or key chains from natural dyed threads; and more.) In this, Indecon has been supported by the European Union since 2013.
In 2008 UNESCO Indonesia (through Burung Indonesia) provided assistance in clean water management and training for tourism services.
That same year, Rumah Asuh Foundation, which aims at preserving and rehabilitating traditional Indonesian houses, also got involved. This foundation sought funding and received donations from private donors and Indonesian companies, which allowed for the rehabilitation of the four remaining houses of the village and rebuilding of three other houses. The rehabilitation works were carried out by a group of 15 architects from Jakarta in 2008, with the participation of the community and the local government.
In 2010 contributions also came from the Indonesian Ministry of Education and Culture.

Near the village of Dintor, 6 km south of Denge (near the coast), the Wae Rebo lodge is a rustic accommodation for visitors to Wae Rebo; 10% of their room rate goes to support the community of Waerebo.

== Awards ==
In 2012 Waerebo was listed as Cultural Heritage Conservation by the UNESCO Asia Pacific. In 2018, it received the Indonesia Sustainable Tourism Award (ISTA) in the Culture category. In 2021 it also received the Indonesian Tourism Village Award as the best tourist attraction.

In 2024 the Spectator Index has classed Wae Rebo second smallest and most beautiful town in the world.

== Bibliography ==
- Beeh, Yefri Yunikson (December 2017). "The role of community in the development of Wae Rebo as a community-based tourism destination in East Nusa Tenggara". Journal of Business on Hospitality and Tourism. 3 (1): 46–63 (see p. 54).
- Suhandi, Ary Sendjaja; Novianti, Evi; Oktavia, Dina; Khan, Alexander M.A.; Simatupang, Wita P. (August 2022). "Community Participation Process in Community-Based Tourism Development in Waerebo Traditional Village, Manggarai Regency, Flores". ASEAN Journal on Hospitality and Tourism. 20 (2): 67–82. ISSN 2722-2748.
- Widyawati, Fransiska (January 2021). "The Transformation of Mbaru Gendang from Communal-Cultural House to Cultural Building in Manggarai, Eastern Indonesia". Proceedings of the 1st International Conference on Education, Humanities, Health and Agriculture (ICEHHA), 3–4 June 2021, Ruteng, Flores, Indonesia.

== See Also ==
- Port of Labuan Bajo
