= Marian Klamer =

Indonesian linguist (born 1965)

- Born: Margaretha Anna Flora Klamer; 1965 (age 60–61); Pirimapun, Papua, Indonesia
- Occupation: Linguist

Marian Klamer (born in 1965 in Pirimapun, Papua province, Indonesia) is a linguist who specializes in Austronesian and Papuan languages. Her interests include the documentation of minority languages, Malay language varieties, linguistic typology, historical linguistics, and language contact.

== Early life and education ==
Klamer was born in Pirimapun village in what is now Safan District, Asmat Regency, Papua province, Indonesia, and spent her childhood there. In 1990, she completed a Master's degree in General Linguistics at VU Amsterdam. She obtained her doctorate in 1994 on the basis of Kambera: a language of Eastern Indonesia.

== Career and publications ==
Klamer conducts extensive linguistic research in eastern Indonesia. As of 2014, she is a professor at Leiden University. She is the author of 50 articles and a number of scientific publications, including grammatical descriptions of the Kambera, Teiwa, and Alor languages.

In 2019 Klamer was elected a member of the Royal Netherlands Academy of Arts and Sciences.
