= Sumba =

Indonesian island in Lesser Sunda Islands

Native name: Humba / Hubba (in Sumba)
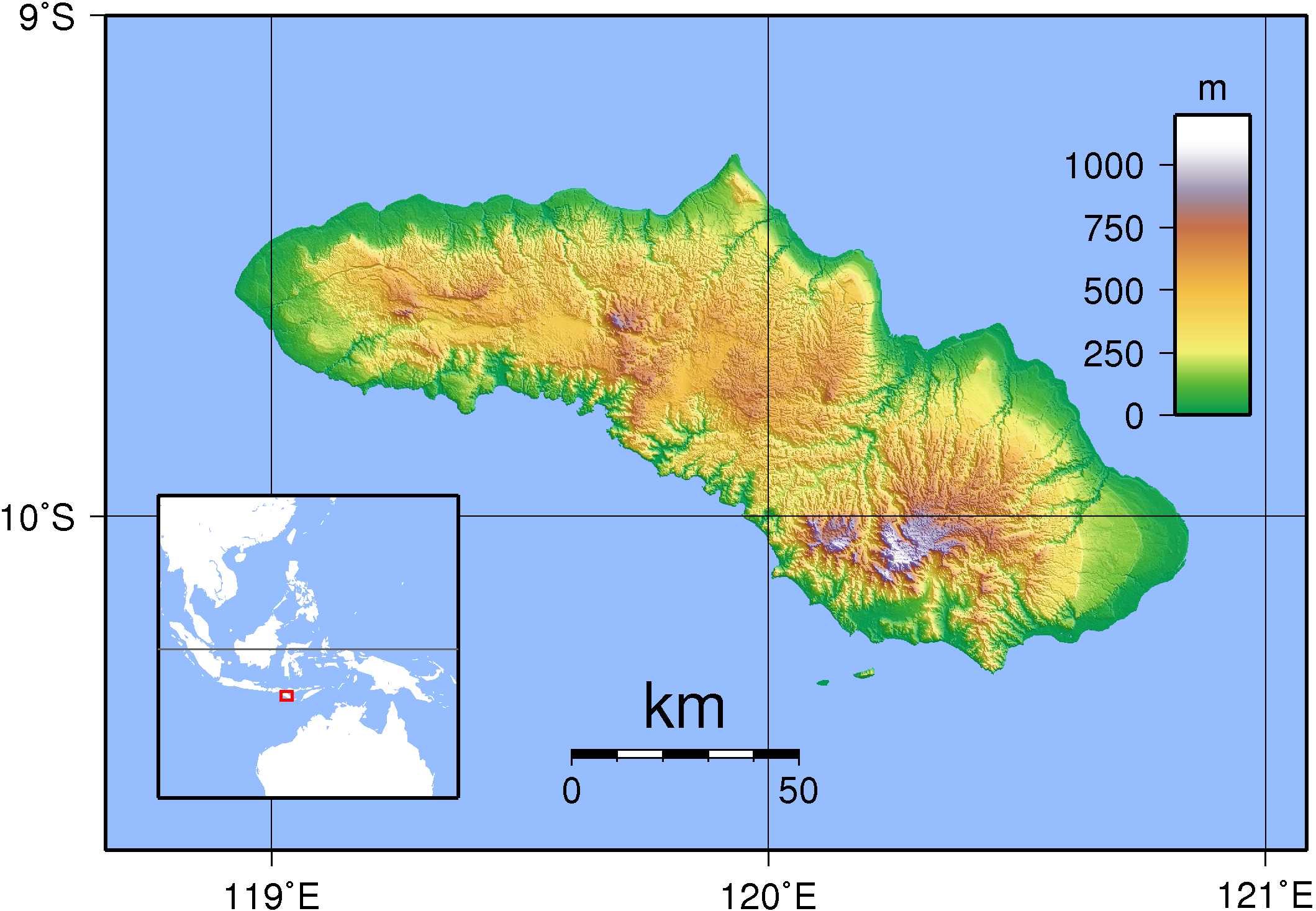
- Interactive map of Sumba

Geography
- Location: Indonesia
- Coordinates: 9°40′S 120°00′E
- Archipelago: Lesser Sunda Islands
- Area: 10,909.55 km^{2} (4,212.20 sq mi)
- Area rank: 73rd
- Highest elevation: 1,225 m (4019 ft)
- Highest point: Mount Wanggameti

Administration
- Indonesia
- Province: East Nusa Tenggara
- Largest settlement: Waingapu (pop. 73,445 – comprising Kota Waingapu and Kambera Districts)

Demographics
- Demonym: Sumbans; Sumbanese
- Population: 852,832 (mid 2025 estimate)
- Pop. density: 75.9/km^{2} (196.6/sq mi)
- Languages: Predominantly native Sumba languages (Kambera, Momboru, Anakalang, Wanukaka, Wejewa, Lamboya, Kodi, and Indonesian (national language of Indonesia)
- Ethnic groups: Predominantly Sumbans

Sumba (Indonesian: Pulau Sumba), natively also spelt as Humba, Hubba, Suba, or Zuba (in Sumba languages) is an Indonesian island (part of the Lesser Sunda Archipelago group) located in the Eastern Indonesia and administratively part of the East Nusa Tenggara provincial territory. Sumba has a land area of 10,909.55 square kilometres (4,212.20 square miles), about the same size as Jamaica or the island of Hawaii. The population was 686,113 at the 2010 Census and 779,049 at the 2020 Census; the official estimate as of mid-2025 was 852,832. To the northwest of Sumba is Sumbawa, to the northeast, across the Sumba Strait (Selat Sumba), is Flores, to the east, across the Savu Sea (including Savu Island), is Timor, and to the south, across part of the Indian Ocean, is Australia.

== Nomenclature ==
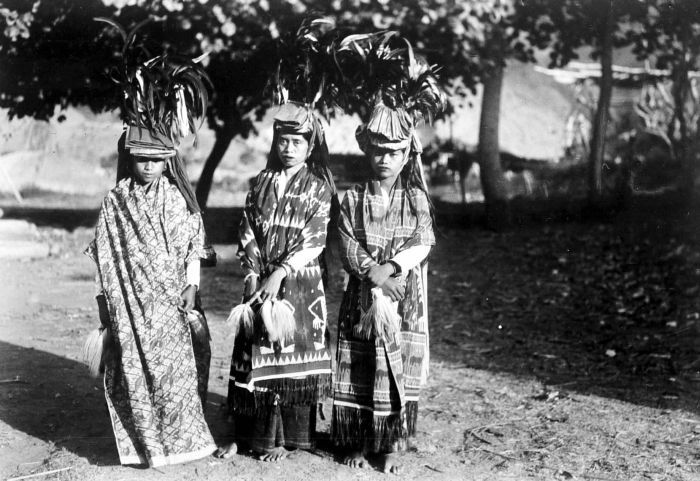
Native women of Sumba wearing the traditional Sumba clothing in Kanangar district of East Sumba, c. 1900s.

The name "Sumba" is derived from the native Sumbanese word humba or hubba (in various Subanese dialects).

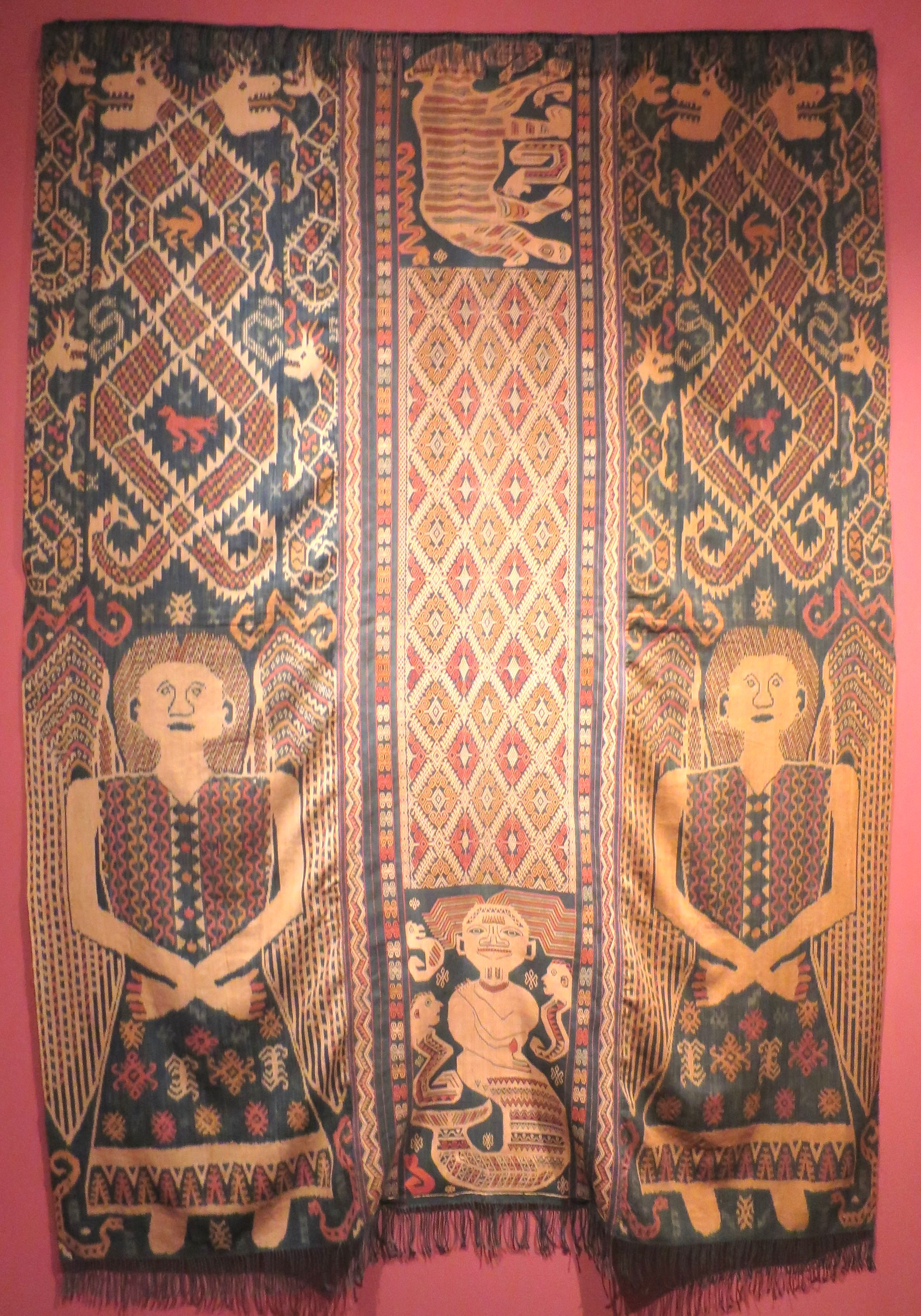
The Hinggi, typical cultural woven cloth of native Sumba men depicts the Sumba mythological creatures.

== History ==
=== Oral traditions ===
According to Sumbanese mythology, Flores and Sumba were once connected by the Kataka Lindiwatu (in Sumba languages), an ancient stone bridge built by the native of Sumba and Flores. Due to the high level of socialization around the Kataka Lindiwatu which connected both islands, civilization was thought to arise from around those regions (which nowadays correspond to northern Sumba and to part of East Sumba regency territory). This story belongs to the Sumba oral traditions as was written down by Umbu Pura Woha (2007) in his book Sejarah, Musyawarah dan Adat Istiadat Sumba Timur (lit. 'History, Deliberation and Customs of East Sumba').

=== Ancient civilization ruins ===
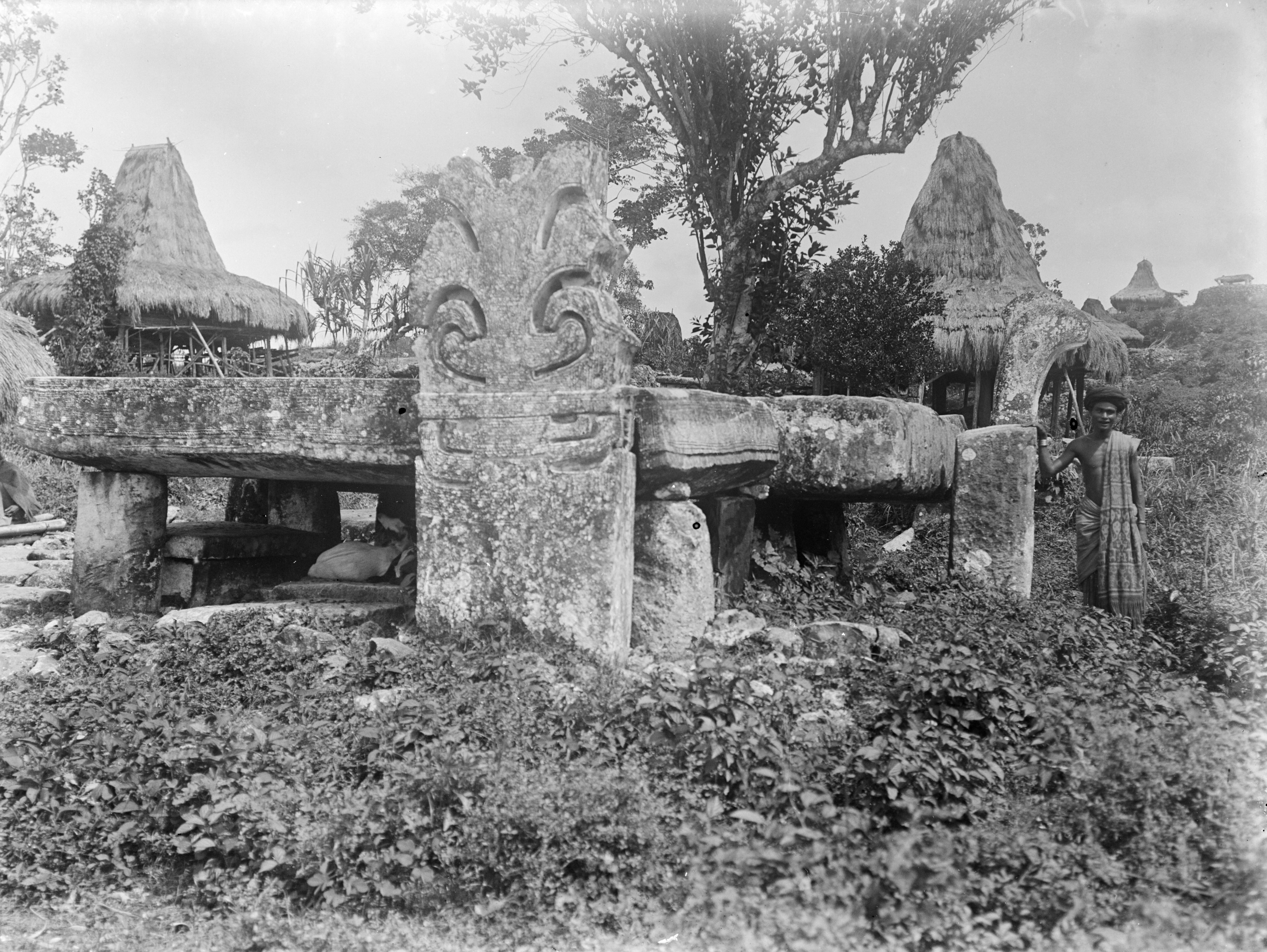
One of the monolith structures in West Sumba.

The ruins of the historical civilization of the Sumba people dates back to the BC era; megalithic burials were found on the central regions of the island (Central Sumba) which go back to thousands of years ago. These stone-based burial traditions are still kept alive by the Sumba people and have become a 'living ancient tradition' that still can be observed by scholars in modern days. The megalithic remains found on Sumba Island include dolmen tombs, upright stones, megalithic statues, stone enclosures, and levelled terraces. The Sumba megalithic tradition itself was characterized by the old megaliths built and carved with high quality standards. Some ancient tools are also found on the island. Notable findings are quadrangular adzes unearthed in the Anakalang area (a cultural region of Anakalang Sumba, a subethnic group of Sumba people).

One significant archaeological discovery was that of the urn burial site in Melolo in the 1920s, dated around 2,870 BC.

=== Javanese power ===
Around the 12th century, the kingdom of Singhasari in eastern Java gained more power over the maritime Southeast Asian territory after the kingdom defeated the Mongols; since then, this kingdom evolved into the empire known as Majapahit. Sumba Island was a subject of Majapahit's dominion, and the word "Sumba" itself was first officially used during the Majapahit era (mentioned in the ancient Javanese manuscripts of Pararaton and Sumpah Palapa oath of Gajah Mada); the word itself was thought as the closest substitution in Javanese for the native name of the island according to native Sumba people, which is Humba or Hubba. It is thought that Javanese people arrived on Sumba Island via the Madura and Kangean route, based on analysis of the DNA of chicken species on Sumba that are only endemic in the eastern parts of Java and its neighbouring islands (which in this case is probably Kangean Island).

=== European colonial period ===
In 1522, the native Sumba came into contact with the Europeans (Portuguese) who arrived on the island by ship to explore the natural resources of the island. Later, it also attracted the Dutch VOC to the region from the 1600s. Historically, sandalwood was the main commodity exported to Europe from this island, thus the Sumba Island was referred to colloquially as the Sandalwood Island or Sandel Island (in English).

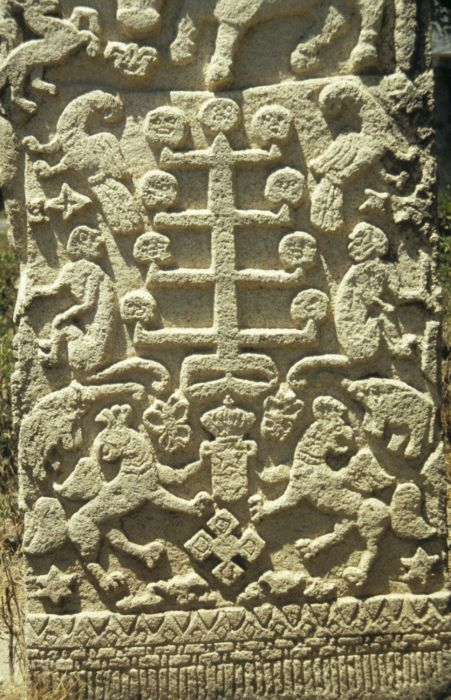
The governmental seal of Dutch colonization at Watuhadang of Umalulu district in East Sumba.

In 1866, governance over the island of Sumba was transferred to the Dutch East Indies colonial power. The well-known Evangelism of the natives of Sumba Island was started in 1886 by the Dutch under the Douwe Wielenga Jesuits' missionary program in the district of Laura in West Sumba.

== Geography, climate and ecology ==
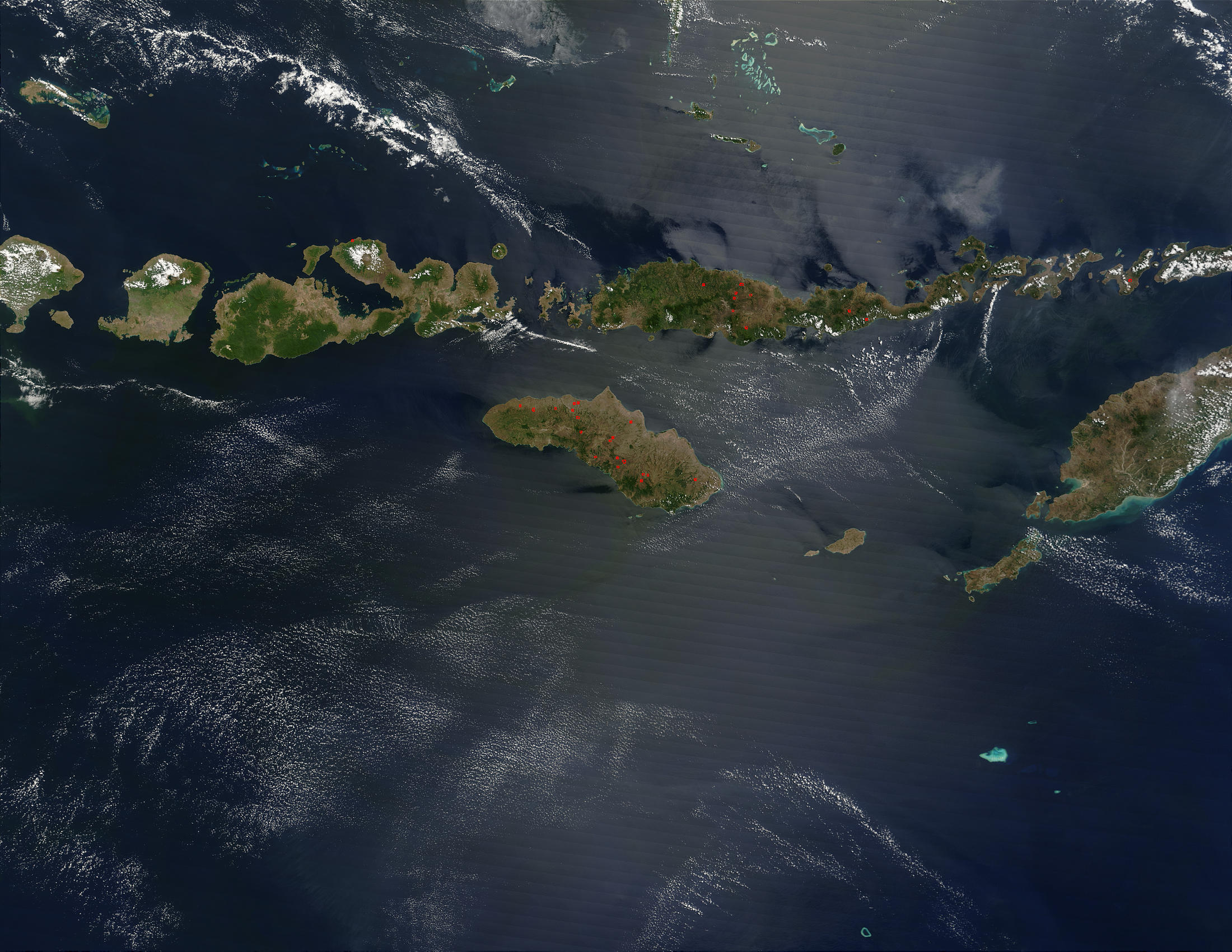
August 2003 NASA satellite photograph of the Lesser Sunda Islands; Sumba is in the bottom centre

The largest town on the island is the main port of Waingapu near the mouth of the Kambaniru River, with a population of 71,752 (including the adjoining district of Kambera) in mid 2023.

The landscape is low, with limestone hills rather than the steep volcanoes of many Indonesian islands. There is a dry season from May to November and a rainy season from December to April. The western side of the island is more fertile and more densely populated than the east.

Although generally thought to be originally part of the Gondwana southern hemisphere supercontinent, recent research suggests that the island might have detached from the South East Asia margin. Most of it was originally covered in deciduous monsoon forest while the south-facing slopes, which remain moist during the dry season, were evergreen rainforest. The northern part of the island has a significant dry season; and its soils have been depleted by deforestation and erosion.

Sumba is in the Wallacea region, having a mixture of plants and animals of Asian and Australasian origin. Due to its distinctive flora and fauna, Sumba has been categorised by the World Wildlife Fund as the Sumba deciduous forests ecoregion.

=== Fauna ===
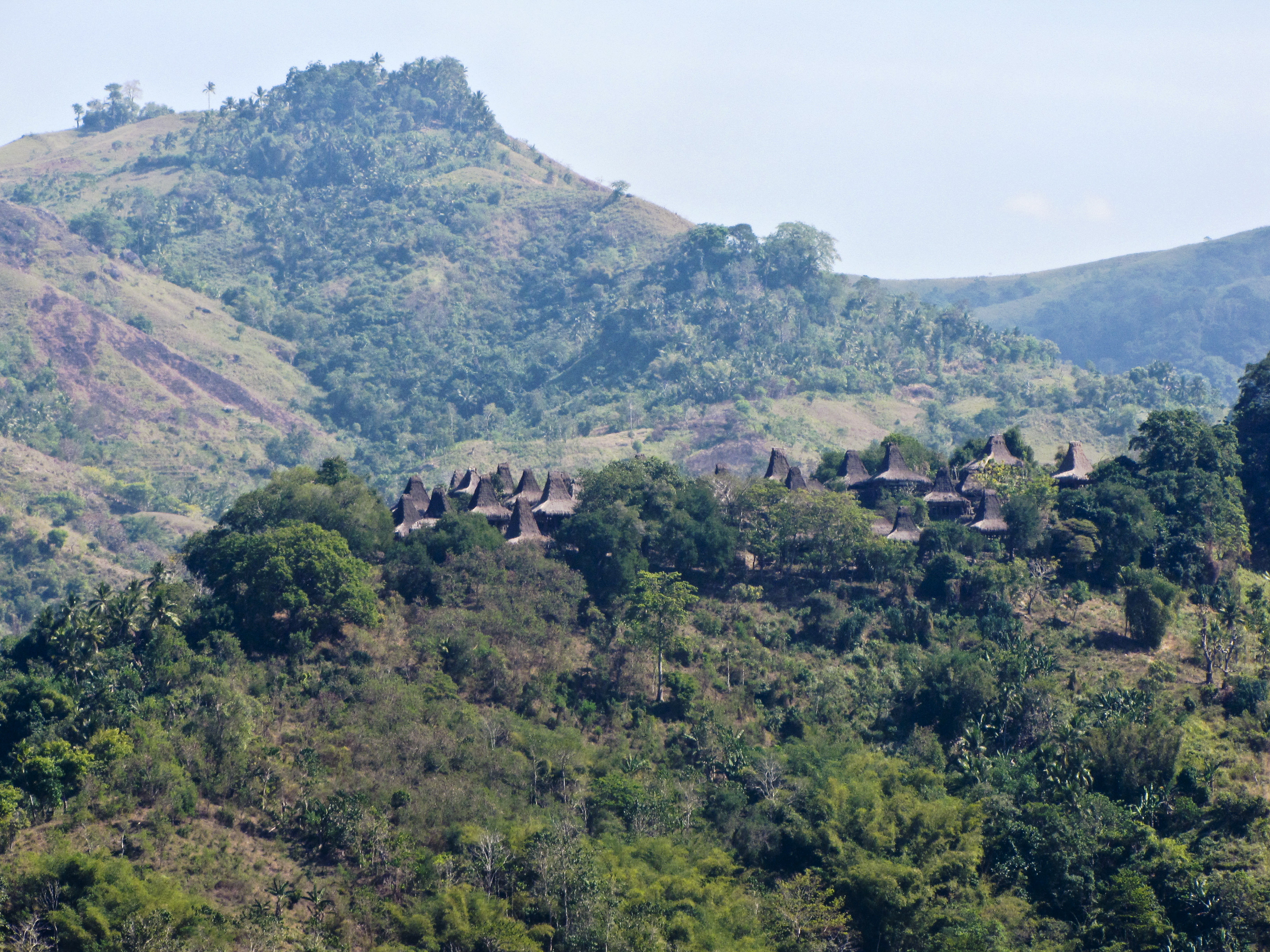
A village in Sumba

There are a number of mammals, but the island is particularly rich in bird life with nearly 200 birds, of which seven endemic species and a number of others are found only here and on some nearby islands. The endemic birds include the threatened Sumba eclectus parrot, four vulnerable species — the secretive Sumba boobook owl, Sumba buttonquail, red-naped fruit-dove, and Sumba hornbill — as well as three more common species: the Sumba green pigeon, Sumba flycatcher, and apricot-breasted sunbird. Saltwater crocodiles can still be found in some areas.

The Sumba hornbill or Julang Sumba (Rhyticeros everetti) is under increasing threat of extinction. Indiscriminate deforestation is threatening their survival. The population is estimated at less than 4,000 with an average density of six individuals per square kilometre. A hornbill can fly to and from over an area of up to 100 square kilometres.

=== Threats and preservation ===
Most of the original forest has been cleared for the planting of maize, cassava, and other crops and only small isolated patches of forest remain. Forest clearance is still ongoing due to the growing population of the island and this represents a threat to the birds.

In 1998 two national parks were designated on the island for the protection of endangered species: the Laiwangi Wanggameti National Park and Manupeu Tanah Daru National Park. Conservation programmes on Sumba have included coral-reef work in East Sumba implemented by Konservasi Indonesia under the Terumbu Karang Sehat Indonesia initiative.

== Administration ==
Sumba is part of the East Nusa Tenggara Province, and there is no single administrative body at the island level. The island and the very small offshore islands administered with it are split into four regencies (local government regions), following re-organisation on 2 January 2007 when two new regencies were created from parts of West Sumba Regency. The four regencies are Sumba Barat (West Sumba), Sumba Barat Daya (Southwest Sumba), Sumba Tengah (Central Sumba) and Sumba Timur (East Sumba), which together accounted for 14.7% of the provincial population in 2023. The regencies are listed below with their areas and their populations at the 2010 Census and the 2020 Census, together with the official estimates as of mid-2025. The provincial capital is not on Sumba Island, but in Kupang on West Timor.

Kode Wilayah	Name of City or Regency	Statute (including year when established)	Area in km^{2}	Pop'n 2010 Census	Pop'n 2020 Census	Pop'n mid 2025 Estimate	Capital	HDI 2022 estimate
53.11	East Sumba Regency (Sumba Timur)	UU 69/1958	7,000.50	227,732	244,820	262,975	Waingapu	0.6617 (Medium)
53.12	West Sumba Regency (Sumba Barat)	UU 69/1958	737.42	110,993	145,097	160,170	Waikabubak	0.6443 (Medium)
53.17	Central Sumba Regency (Sumba Tengah)	UU 3/2007	1,789.69	62,485	85,482	94,187	Waibakul	0.6271 (Medium)
53.18	Southwest Sumba Regency (Sumba Barat Daya)	UU 16/2007	1,381.94	284,903	303,650	335,500	Tambolaka	0.6315 (Medium)
	Sumba		10,909.55	686,113	779,049	852,832		

== Culture ==
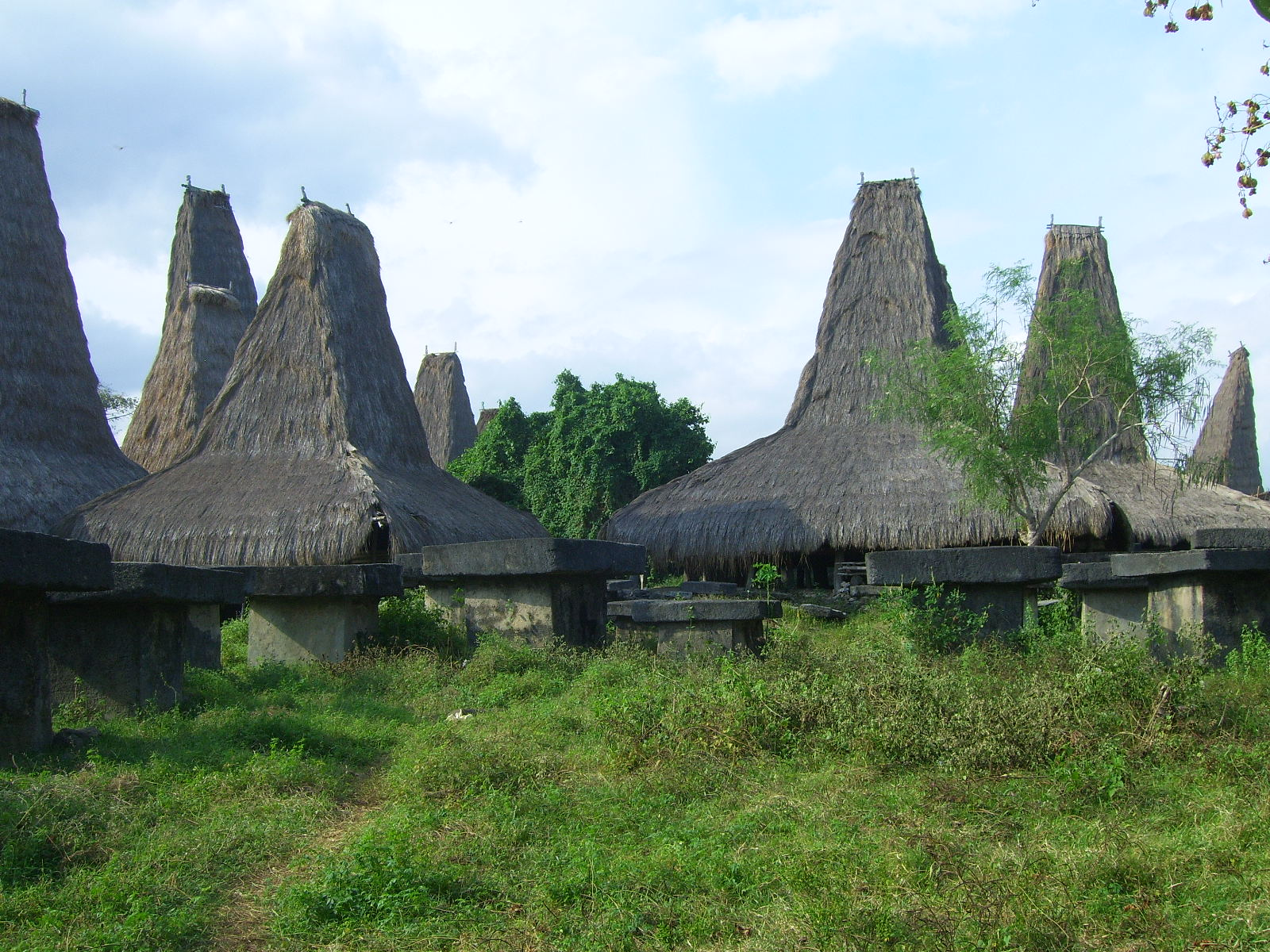
Traditional Sumbanese houses near Bondokodi, West Sumba

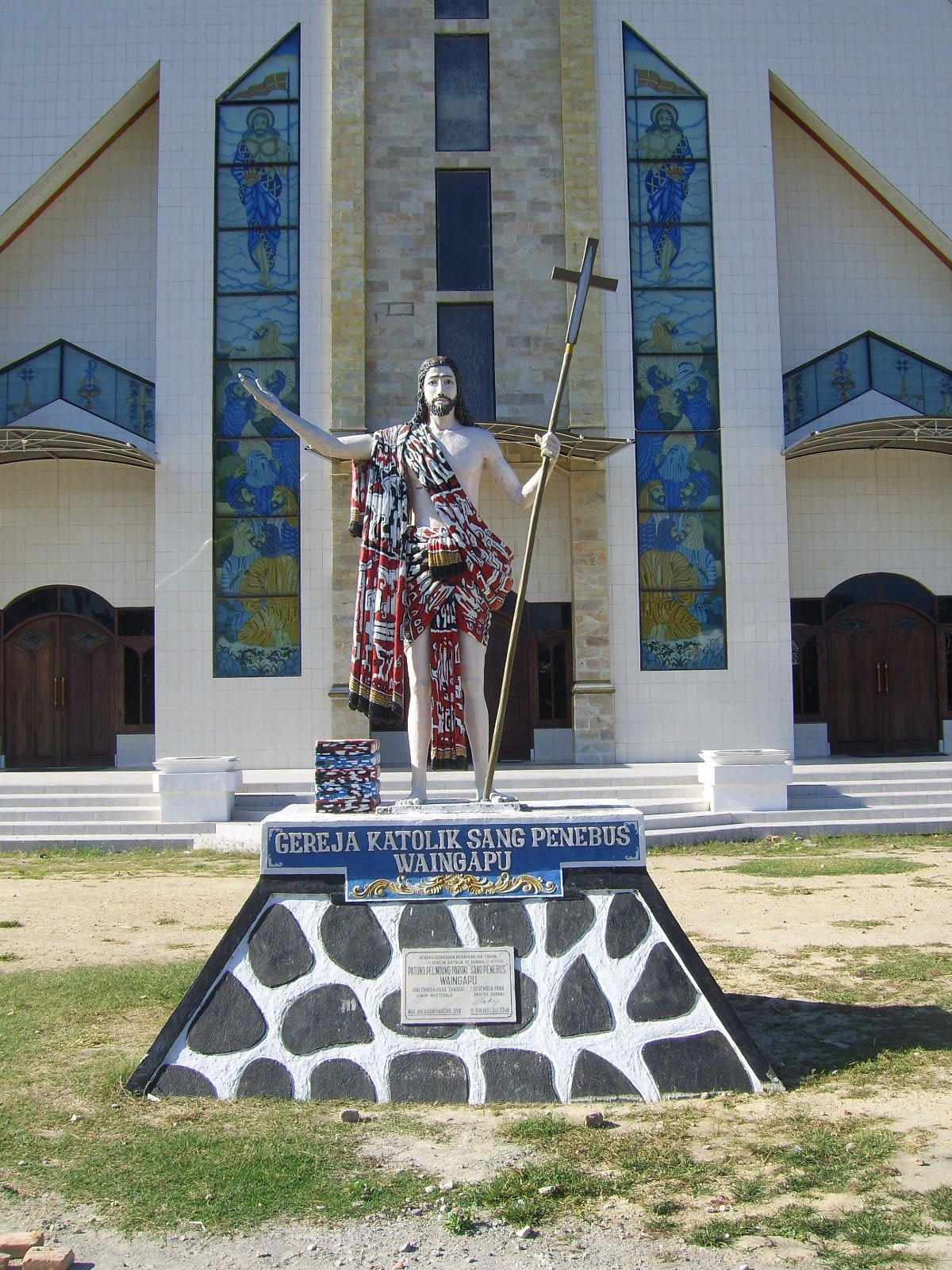
Catholic church in Waingapu, East Sumba Regency

Religion in Sumba (2023)
1. Protestantism (62.9%)
2. Roman Catholic (29.8%)
3. Islam (4.05%)
4. Marapu and others (3.15%)
5. Hinduism (0.10%)
6. Buddhism (0.00%)

The west part of Sumba is inhabited by segmentary societies made of clans and of politically autonomous villages, while Sumba North and East are occupied by stratified societies (based on castes) made of clan confederations and led by a dominant clan from which a “king” (raja) is chosen, who yields a real political power. Thus West Sumba is more ethnically and linguistically diverse. Both systems exist simultaneously with a 3-tier class system (aristocracy, common people and slaves) assimilated in such a way that – paradoxically – it does not impair the egalitarian functioning of the Western segmentary societies.

Villages almost always include members of several clans, because at each generation many of the youngest ones settle in villages other than the one they originated from – and these may belong to an allied clan and not their own original clan and lineage.

As of 2021, Sumba is the last place on Earth where societies have remained close to the traditions of South-East Asian hill tribes and still build megalithic monuments such as dolmens for collective burials: 100 new megalithic tombs are still built each year on the island. But this too is reflected in the East / West divide: the Western segmentary societies build many more dolmens than the Eastern stratified societies; and dolmens in the east are larger, more richly decorated and are reserved for the royal clan. Waingapu, a Kodi (Note: The Kodi are one of the 24 ethnic groups that inhabit Sumba.) settlement in the west of Sumba, has some 1,400 dolmens – one of the highest concentrations on the island.

The Sumbanese have a mixture of Austronesian and Melanesian ancestry. Sumba is home to 24 ethnic groups who speak nine Austronesian languages, some of these including several dialects. The largest language group is the Kambera language, spoken by a quarter of a million people in the eastern half of Sumba. Other local languages include Wewewa and Anakalang in the west, while in the far southeast are speakers of the Sabu language, shared with the islands of Savu and Raijua to the east.

Five to eight percent of the population practises the Marapu religion. which has elements of animism and of ancestor worship, although much of the younger generations seem to reject Marapu. This may be at least in part because most functioning schools are Catholic and embracing that religion is more likely in the school environment. Whatever the cause, the difference is significant compared to some other traditional places such as Waerebo, where the locals have a Christian first name and a traditional second name. The overwhelming majority are Christian, most of whom are Dutch Calvinist with a substantial minority being Roman Catholic. A small number of Sunni Muslim settlers are found along the coastal areas, although Islam is not a major factor in the island (as with most of East Nusa Tenggara)

Sumba is famous for ikat textiles, particularly very detailed hand-woven ikat. The process of dyeing and weaving ikat is labor-intensive and one piece can take months to prepare. Ikat from West Sumba is notably different to that produced in the East: its only designs are geometric motifs and it usually includes a part that imitates a reticulated python skin.

== Development and living standards ==
Sumba is one of the poorer islands of Indonesia.

=== Health ===
A relatively high percentage of the population suffers from malaria, although the illness is almost eradicated in the western part of the island. Infant mortality is high.

=== Water ===
Access to water is one of the major challenges on Sumba. During the dry season, many streams dry out and villagers depend on wells for scarce supplies of water. Villagers have to travel several kilometres several times a day to fetch water. It is mainly the women and children who are sent for water, while the men are at work. The Sumba Foundation has been active in raising sponsorship to drill wells in villages and attempting to reduce poverty on the island. As of February 2013, the Sumba Foundation was responsible for 48 wells and 191 water stations, supplying 15 schools with water and sanitation, and reducing malaria rates by some 85%.

=== Electricity ===
Electricity mainly comes from diesel generators. New projects include 3 MW Bayu wind power plant (PLTB) in Kadumbul, East Sumba by PT Hywind. Another is the Bodo Hula Biomass Power Plant (PLTBm), West Sumba. 1 MW capacity. Other existing renewable electricity projects involve solar PV and micro-hydropower.

== Tourism ==
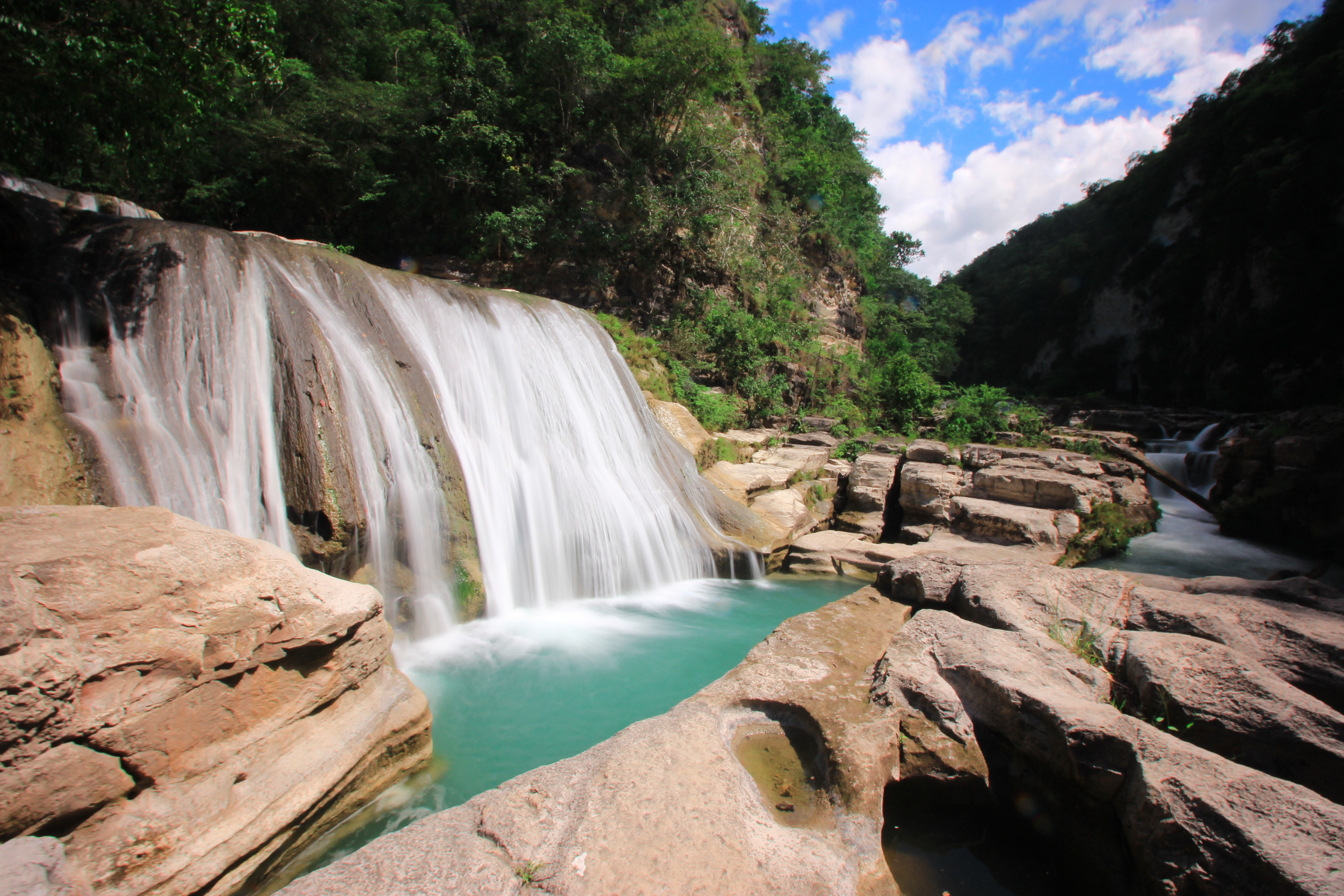
Tanggedu Waterfall, East Sumba

=== Areas of interest ===
- Tanggedu Waterfall (Air Terjun Tanggedu), 50 kilometres north-west of Waingapu, the capital city of the East Sumba Regency (the itinerary to the waterfall goes through Purukambera on the coast).
- Puru Kambera Beach, 30 kilometres north-west of Waingapu (one-hour drive)
- Tarimbang Bay, 87 kilometres south-west of Waingapu (three-hour drive), is a surfers paradise with 2- to 3-meter tall waves between June and September.
- Watu Mandorak Cove, a white sandy beach with cliffs 42 kilometers south-west of Tambolaka (two-hour drive in the dry season; in the rainy season, the journey takes longer and is not recommended).
- Walakiri Beach, 24 km (15 mi) east of Waingapu, for its famed "dancing trees".
- The Sumba Hospitality Foundation is located in West Sumba (Sumba Barat). This organization is dedicated to providing vocational education in hospitality to underprivileged students hailing from all across Sumba.

=== Resorts ===
NIHI Sumba has been ranked as one of the world's five best eco-hotels and was awarded the world's best hotel of 2016 and 2017 from Travel + Leisure for its native ambiance and authentic local experience.

=== Surfing ===
Surfing is one of the main highlights of Sumba, with many surf breaks along its coastline. Occy's Left, a left-hand surf break off Nihiwatu named after Australian surfer Mark 'Occy' Occhilupo, and the right-hander Miller's Right are some of the island's well-known breaks.

== See also ==
- Soemba Mission
- List of islands of Indonesia

== Bibliography ==
- Alex, Mason (2025). Sumba Travel Guide 2025; A Complete Companion to Adventure, History, and Local Life. ISBN 9798-265-339614.
- Paccou-Martellière, Véronique; Hinterseer, Thomas H. (2016). Arts and traditions of Sumba. Paris: Le Livre D Art. ISBN 978-2-355-32241-9.
