= Sumba languages =

Subgroup of the Austronesian language family

Sumba
- Geographic distribution: Indonesia
- Linguistic classification: Austronesian: Malayo-Polynesian; Central–Eastern; Sumba–Flores; Sumba–Hawu; Sumba

Language codes
- ISO 639-3: –
- Glottolog: sumb1243
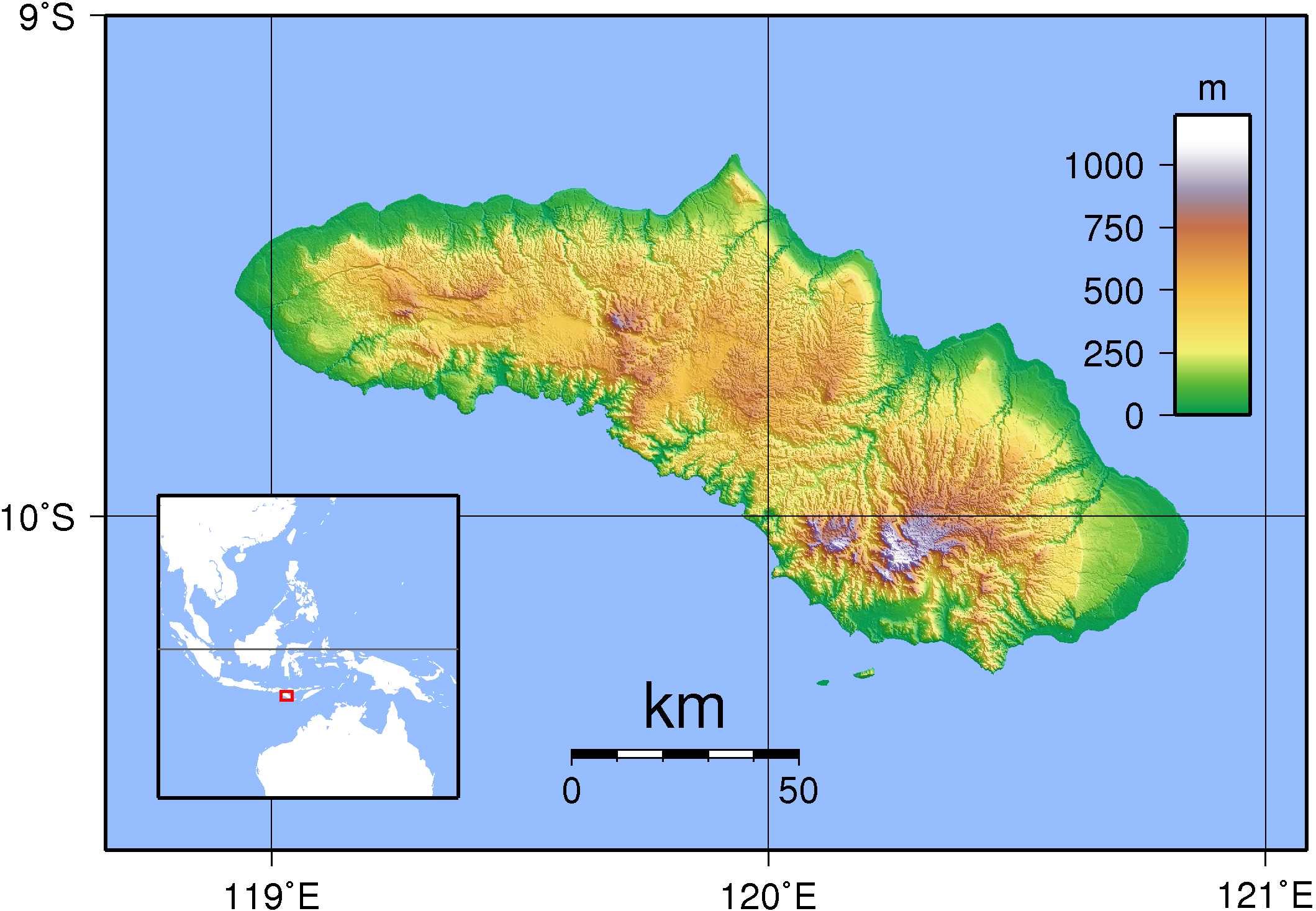
- The Indonesian island of Sumba, where the Sumba languages are spoken

The Sumba languages are a subgroup of the Austronesian language family, spoken on Sumba, an island in eastern Indonesia. They are closely related to the Hawu-Dhao languages.

== Classification ==
A preliminary internal classification by Asplund (2010) recognizes three branches of the Sumba languages:

- Sumba
  - Central–East Sumbanese
    - East Sumbanese: Kambera (dialect cluster)
    - Mamboru
    - Central Sumbanese
      - Anakalangu
      - Wanukaka
      - Baliledu-Buawa
  - Wejewa–Lamboya
    - Wejewa
    - Lamboya
  - Kodi–Garo
    - Kodi
    - Garo
