= List of rivers of East Kalimantan =

Major rivers of East Kalimantan in Borneo island

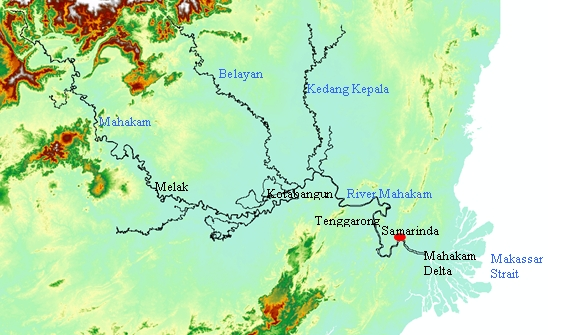
Mahakam River and some of its tributaries.

List of rivers flowing in the province of East Kalimantan, Indonesia:

== In alphabetical order ==
- Berau River
  - Kelai River
- Mahakam River
  - Belayan River
  - Kaso River
  - Lawa River
  - Telen River
- Tunan River

== See also ==
- Drainage basins of Kalimantan
- List of drainage basins of Indonesia
- List of rivers of Indonesia
- List of rivers of Kalimantan
