= List of rivers of West Kalimantan =

Major rivers of West Kalimantan in Borneo island

List of rivers flowing in the province of West Kalimantan, Indonesia:

== In alphabetical order ==
- Kapuas River
- Keriau River
- Melawi River
- Pawan River
- Sambas River
- Sekayam River

== See also ==
- Drainage basins of Kalimantan
- List of drainage basins of Indonesia
- List of rivers of Indonesia
- List of rivers of Kalimantan
