= List of rivers of North Kalimantan =

Major rivers of North Kalimantan in Borneo island

Map of North Kalimantan (Indonesian: Kalimantan Utara) with some major rivers.

List of rivers flowing in the province of North Kalimantan, Indonesia:

== In alphabetical order ==
- Kayan River
  - Bahau River
- Sembakung River
- Sesayap River

== See also ==
- Drainage basins of Kalimantan
- List of drainage basins of Indonesia
- List of rivers of Indonesia
- List of rivers of Kalimantan
