= List of rivers of South Kalimantan =

Major rivers of South Kalimantan in Borneo island

List of rivers flowing in the province of South Kalimantan, Indonesia:

== In alphabetical order ==
- Barito River
- Martapura River
- Negara River
- Tabalong River

== See also ==
- Drainage basins of Kalimantan
- List of drainage basins of Indonesia
- List of rivers of Indonesia
- List of rivers of Kalimantan
