= List of rivers of Central Kalimantan =

Major rivers of Central Kalimantan in Borneo island

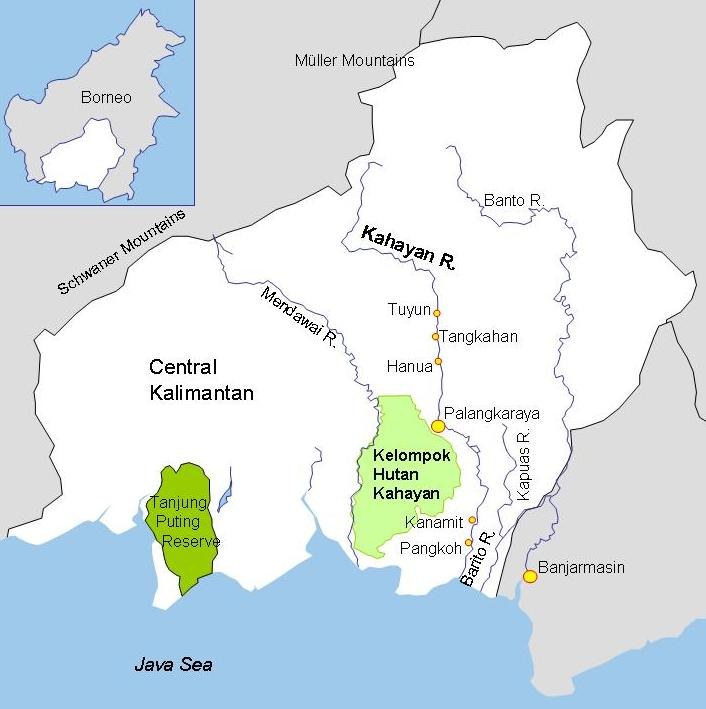
Rivers near Kahayan.

List of rivers flowing in the province of Central Kalimantan, Indonesia:

== In alphabetical order ==
- Barito River
  - Kapuas River
- Jelai-Bila River
- Kahayan River
- Kumai River
  - Sekonyer River
- Lamandau River
  - Arut River
- Mendawai River
- Pembuang River
- Sampit River

== See also ==
- Drainage basins of Kalimantan
- List of drainage basins of Indonesia
- List of rivers of Indonesia
- List of rivers of Kalimantan
