= Kapuas =

Kapuas may refer to:

- Kapuas River
- Kapuas Hulu, in West Borneo
- Kapuas Regency, in Central Borneo
- Kapuas River (Barito River)
