= List of rivers of Kalimantan =

Major rivers of Kalimantan

List of rivers flowing in Kalimantan, which is Indonesian portion of the island of Borneo, comprising 73% of the island's area.

== In alphabetical order ==
- Barito River
  - Alalak River
  - Martapura River
  - Kapuas River
  - Negara River
    - Tabalong River
- Berau River
  - Kelai River
- Jelai-Bila River
- Kahayan River
- Kapuas River
  - Sekayam River
  - Melawi River
- Kayan River
  - Bahau River
- Kumai River
  - Sekonyer River
- Lamandau River
  - Arut River
- Mahakam River
  - Belayan River
  - Kaso River
  - Lawa River
  - Telen River
- Mendawai River
- Pawan River
  - Keriau River
- Pembuang River
- Sambas River
- Sampit River
- Sembakung River
- Sesayap River
- Tunan River

== By Province ==
=== Central Kalimantan ===
- Barito River
  - Kapuas River
- Jelai-Bila River
- Kahayan River
- Kumai River
  - Sekonyer River
- Lamandau River
  - Arut River
- Mendawai River
- Pembuang River
- Sampit River

=== East Kalimantan ===
- Berau River
  - Kelai River
- Mahakam River
  - Belayan River
  - Kaso River
  - Lawa River
  - Telen River

=== North Kalimantan ===
- Kayan River
  - Bahau River
- Sembakung River
- Sesayap River

=== South Kalimantan ===
- Barito River
- Martapura River
- Negara River
- Tabalong River

=== West Kalimantan ===
- Kapuas River
- Keriau River
- Melawi River
- Pawan River
- Sambas River
- Sekayam River

== See also ==
- Drainage basins of Kalimantan
- List of drainage basins of Indonesia
- List of rivers of Indonesia
