= Georg Müller (explorer) =

Georg Müller (8 June 1790 – c. January 1826) was a German engineer and explorer.

Born in Mainz in 1790, Müller served in the French army during the Napoleonic wars and later in the Royal Netherlands East Indies Army. He went to Sambas in west Borneo in 1818 and undertook several exploration and mapping trips in subsequent years. While on an expedition to explore the upper Kapuas River early in 1826, Müller was ambushed and killed by the island's indigenous inhabitants.

The Müller Mountains are named after him.
