= Sokan District =

Sokan
- District
- Location within West Kalimantan Location within Kalimantan Location within Indonesia
- Coordinates: 0°54′S 111°30′E
- Country: Indonesia
- Province: West Kalimantan
- Regency: Melawi
- District seat: Nanga Sokan

Area
  - Total: 1,577.2 km^{2} (609.0 sq mi)

Population (2020)
  - Total: 18,710
  - Density: 11.86/km^{2} (30.72/sq mi)

Sokan is a district in Melawi Regency, West Kalimantan, Indonesia. As of the 2020 Census, it was inhabited by 18,710 people, and had a total area of 1,577.2 km^{2}.

== Geography ==
Sokan District consists of eighteen villages (desa):

- Gelata
- Keluing Taja
- Landau Kabu
- Melana
- Muara Tanjung
- Nanga Betangai
- Nanga Libas
- Nanga Ora
- Nanga Potai
- Nanga Sokan
- Nanga Tangkit
- Penyengkuang
- Sepakat
- Sijau
- Tanjung Mahung
- Tanjung Sokan
- Telaga Raya
- Teluk Pongkal
