= Nanga Pinoh Airport =

Nanga Pinoh Airport Bandar Udara Nanga Pinoh
- IATA: NPO; ICAO: WIOG

Summary
- Airport type: Public
- Operator: Melawi Regency Government
- Serves: Nanga Pinoh
- Location: Melawi, Kapuas Raya, Indonesia
- Elevation AMSL: 123 ft / 37 m
- Coordinates: 0°20′54″S 111°44′44″E

Map
- Location of airport in Kalimantan

Runways
| Direction | Length | | Surface |
| Direction | ft | m | Surface |
|---|---|---|---|
| 10/28 | 4,265 | 1,300 | Asphalt |

Nanga Pinoh Airport (IATA: NPO, ICAO: WIOG) is an airport in Nanga Pinoh, the capital city of Melawi Regency, Kapuas Raya, Indonesia.

== Airlines and destinations ==
There are no scheduled flights operate at the airport.
