= Kayan River =

Kayan River Sungai Kayan, Sungai Bulungan, Sungai Kajan, Sungai Ulungan, Boetoengan Rivier, Bulungan River, Boeloengan Rivier
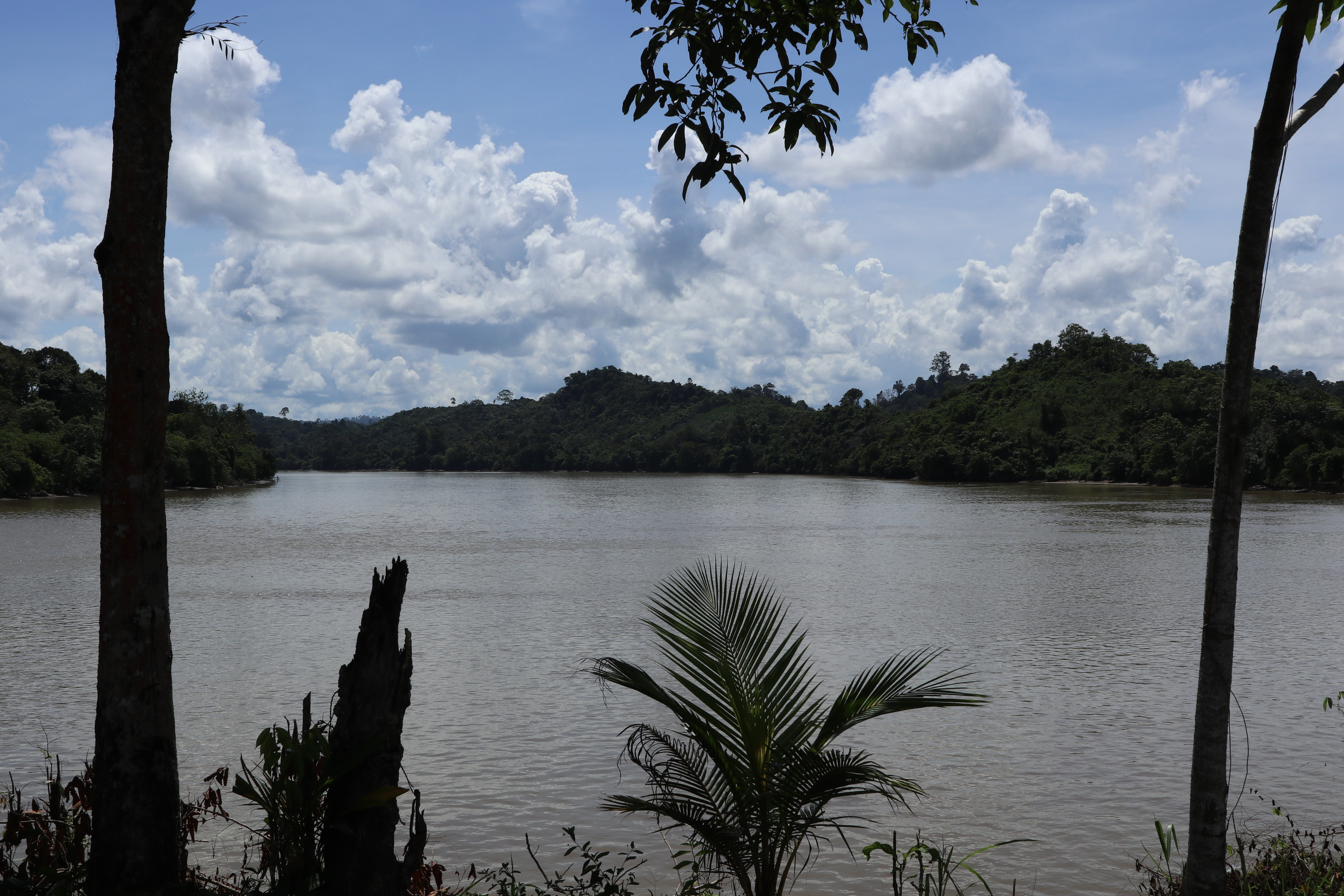
- Panoramic Kayan River

- Location of river mouth Kayan River (Indonesia)

Location
- Country: Indonesia

Physical characteristics
- Source
  - location: Ukeng Mountains, Borneo
  - coordinates: 1°34′49.6992″N 114°53′12.408″E
  - elevation: 2,015 m (6,611 ft)
- Mouth
  - location: Sulawesi Sea
  - coordinates: 2°54′41.29″N 117°33′14.11″E
  - elevation: 0 m (0 ft)
- Length: 576 km (358 mi)
- Basin size: 33,171.8 km^{2} (12,807.7 mi^{2})
- Discharge
  - location: Kayan Delta
  - average: (Period: 1996–2005)77.738 km^{3}/a (2,463.4 m^{3}/s)

Basin features
- Progression: Sulawesi Sea
- River system: Kayan River
- Tributaries
  - left: Nawan, Pengean, Iwan, Gat, Kajananiot, Kajananbaula, Peto, Bahau, Peso, Brun, Pimping
  - right: Tekwau, Langan, Laham, Kayaniat, Lejo, Pangean, Keburau, Sajau, Binai

Kayan River in Kalimantan

The Kayan River is a river of Borneo island, flowing in the North Kalimantan province of Indonesia, about 1,600 km northeast of the capital Jakarta.

== Course ==
The Kayan is a large river in Borneo. It is one of the largest and most important rivers in the province of Kalimantan Utara. It rises in the northern part of the island's central mountain range in the Ukeng Mountains and flows in a large delta into the Sulawesi Sea below the provincial capital Tanjung Selor.

== Geography and hydrology ==
The Kayan River rises on Mount Ukeng, passing Tanjung Selor city, and discharges into the Sulawesi Sea, with a total length of about 576 km (358 mi) and a basin size of 33,005 km^{2} (12,743 mi^{2}), forming a wide area at the upstream and narrower in the center until downstream.

The Kayan River is named after the Kayan Dayak tribe. Its headwaters originate in the Ukeng Mountains at an altitude of about 2,015 m (6,611 ft) above sea level. The river cuts through mountainous areas in a south-east, east-east and then north-east direction with high gradient rapids. It flows over Tanjung Selor for more than 70 km through coral and limestone hills to the town. Its banks are typically lined with nipas, with some coconut trees. Below the town it eventually ends in the wide Kayan Delta in the Sulawesi Sea.

The average width of its lower reaches is around 500 m (1,600 ft). At the mouth it rises between 700–1,000 m (2,300–3,300 ft). Depth is generally around 10 m (33 ft). Tanjung Selor (about 60 km from the sea) is navigable by larger boats. Higher up, it can be navigated by small boats, and the more rapids only by boat.

The catchment receives between 3,500 and 4,000 mm of rainfall per year (Köppen's climate classification Af type).

=== Delta ===
The tidal delta covers an area of about 3,000 square kilometres. The deltas of the Kayan, Sekatak, Sesayap and Sembakung rivers form a continuous ‘delta complex’ (Tarakan, the largest city in North Kalimantan Province, is located on Tarakan Island, opposite the deltas).

=== Discharge ===
Year, period	Average discharge	Ref.
Kayan Delta 2°56′23.0856″N 117°41′51.2268″E
1996–2005	77.738 km^{3}/a (2,463.4 m^{3}/s)	
Tanjung Selor 2°48′52.0236″N 117°21′39.9024″E
2016–2020	2,261 m^{3}/s (79,800 cu ft/s)	
	2,454 m^{3}/s (86,700 cu ft/s)	
Kayan III hydroelectric power plant 2°41′37.986″N 116°45′29.0988″E
	2,184 m^{3}/s (77,100 cu ft/s)	
Kayan II hydroelectric power plant 2°34′49.2492″N 116°27′47.358″E
	2,000 m^{3}/s (71,000 cu ft/s)	
Kayan I hydroelectric power plant 2°6′47.5452″N 116°11′39.5664″E
	1,100 m^{3}/s (39,000 cu ft/s)	

Average monthly discharge at Tanjung Selor (2°48′52.0236″N 117°21′39.9024″E)
Month	Discharge (m^{3}/s)
JAN	2,826
FEB	2,424
MAR	2,733
APR	1,938
MAY	2,451
JUN	2,511
JUL	2,099
AUG	2,323
SEP	2,193
OCT	2,488
NOV	2,713
DEC	2,749
Avg.	2,454

=== Tributaries ===
Kayan has 12 major tributaries. The Bahau is the largest of these.

The main tributaries from the mouth:

Left tributary	Right tributary	Length (km)	Basin size (km^{2})	Average discharge (m^{3}/s)
Kayan		576	33,171.8	2,463.4
	Binai		427.8	22.5
	Sajau		782.5	42.9
Pimping			622.5	41.3
	Keburau		791.5	49.3
Brun			445.5	29.7
Peso			221	14.5
	Pangean		581.1	42.1
Lejo			385.5	25.6
Bahau		322	9,186.6	740
	Paho		326	25.7
Peto			368.7	31.8
	Kayaniat		4,102.5	330.7
Kajanan-baula			385.1	31.7
Kajana-niot			203.6	17.2
	Laham		644.5	50.2
Gat			488.2	37.5
	Langan		226.7	17.2
Iwan			3,076.6	191.7
Pengean			279.4	25.6
Nawan			216.4	19.3
	Tekwau		401.7	32

== Ecology and economy ==
The Bulungan district of the Kayan River in northern Kalimantan is characterised by rich biodiversity and includes ecosystems such as lowland tropical rainforest, montane forest, peat swamps, mangroves and karst. The Kayan Delta is home to at least 6 native mangrove species (Rhizophora apiculata, Osbornia octodonta, Lumnitzera littorea, Avicennia sp., Rhizophora sp., Sonneratia sp.). The interior of the delta is dominated by nipah (Nypa fruticans), while parts of the delta are home to mixed freshwater and saltwater ecosystems.

The Kayan is vital for communities living along the river and in its delta, as they depend on it for freshwater, fisheries and agriculture. Dayak people living along the river depend on farming, agriculture and fishing. Their vast rice fields have been cultivated for generations.

Today, the Kayan watershed has become a centre for investment. Large areas have been converted into palm oil and timber plantations, mining areas, fish ponds and agricultural land.

== Uses ==
=== Transportation ===
For ages, the Kayan River served as the main transportation route for the inhabitants of Malinau and Bulungan Regency to reach the inland region of Malinau Regency using traditional boats or out of the Bulungan Regency using speed boats, while downstream there are some river ports for passengers and goods, such as Port of Kayan and Port of Pesawan.

=== Fishery and agriculture ===
The people along the Kayan River utilize the water for agriculture and fishery, either by traditional fishing or netting, especially in the upstream area, whereas about 30,000 hectares of land of the Delta Kayan is used as a Food Estate area, for fish ponds and farmlands.

=== Hydroelectricity ===
The Kayan River is used to produce hydroelectricity using some power plants, such as the Diesel-powered one in the village of Long Nawang, Kayan Hulu subdistrict. The river can produce around 900 megawatts (MW). There is also a dam for the hydroelectric power plant in the village of Desa Long Peso, Peso sub-district, Bulungan Regency.

== Villages along the Kayan River ==
=== Antutan ===
Antutan village (Bahasa Indonesia – Desa Antutan) is one of the many villages situated along the Kayan River. The population of the village consists of Dayak sub-tribes: the Kenyah and the Kayan as well as the Tidung and the Bulungan. There are several main sources of income in this village, such as paddy plantation, farming, fishing, and crafts selling. The majority of the villagers heavily depended on the paddy rice plantation to make a living. However, some are also public servants, for example, teachers, nurses, soldiers, and police personnel.

== See also ==
- List of rivers of Indonesia
- List of rivers of Kalimantan
