= Toho, Mempawah =

Toho
- District
- Interactive map of Toho
- Coordinates: 0°24.63′N 109°13.52′E
- Country: Indonesia
- Province: West Kalimantan
- Regency: Mempawah
- District seat: Pak Laheng

Area
  - Total: 226.01 km^{2} (87.26 sq mi)

Population (2024)
  - Total: 25,120
  - Density: 111.1/km^{2} (287.9/sq mi)

Toho is a district in Mempawah Regency, West Kalimantan, Indonesia. In 2024, it was inhabited by 25,120 people, and had a total area of 226.01 km^{2}.

== Geography ==
Toho District consists of eight villages (desa):

- Benuang
- Kecurit
- Pak Laheng
- Pak Utan
- Sambora
- Sepang
- Terap
- Toho Ilir
