= Sayan, Melawi =

Sayan
- District
- Interactive map of Sayan
- Coordinates: 0°43′S 111°40′E
- Country: Indonesia
- Province: West Kalimantan
- Regency: Melawi
- District seat: Nanga Sayan

Area
  - Total: 1,166.3 km^{2} (450.3 sq mi)

Population (2024)
  - Total: 20,294
  - Density: 17.400/km^{2} (45.067/sq mi)

Sayan is a district in Melawi Regency, West Kalimantan, Indonesia. In 2024, it was inhabited by 20,294 people, and had a total area of 1,166.3 km^{2}.

== Geography ==
Sayan District consists of 18 villages (desa):

- Nanga Sayan
- Pekawai
- Landau Sandak
- Madya Raya
- Karangan Purun
- Mekar Pelita
- Bora
- Meta Bersatu
- Nanga Kasai
- Nanga Kompi
- Nanga Mancur
- Siling Permai
- Lingkar Indah
- Sayan Jaya
- Nanga Pak
- Tumbak Raya
- Berobai Permai
- Nanga Raku
