= Nanga Pinoh =

Capital city of Melawi Regency, West Kalimantan

Coordinates: 0°20′S 111°44′E

Nanga Pinoh is the principal town and administrative centre of Melawi Regency, West Kalimantan, Indonesia. The population of Nanga Pinoh District was 54,424 in the 2020 Census, increased to 56,813 according to the official estimates for mid 2022. The town is positioned at the junction of the Melawi River and the Pinoh River. A statue of a warrior known to the Melawi people as Apang Semangai stands in the town centre.

== Climate ==
Climate data for Nanga Pinoh (1991–2020 normals)
Month	Jan	Feb	Mar	Apr	May	Jun	Jul	Aug	Sep	Oct	Nov	Dec	Year
Mean daily maximum °C (°F)	31.8 (89.2)	31.9 (89.4)	32.2 (90.0)	32.3 (90.1)	32.4 (90.3)	32.3 (90.1)	32.1 (89.8)	32.3 (90.1)	32.3 (90.1)	32.1 (89.8)	32.0 (89.6)	31.8 (89.2)	32.1 (89.8)
Daily mean °C (°F)	27.5 (81.5)	27.7 (81.9)	27.9 (82.2)	28.2 (82.8)	28.5 (83.3)	28.2 (82.8)	28.0 (82.4)	28.0 (82.4)	28.0 (82.4)	28.0 (82.4)	27.8 (82.0)	27.5 (81.5)	27.9 (82.2)
Mean daily minimum °C (°F)	23.1 (73.6)	23.0 (73.4)	23.0 (73.4)	23.2 (73.8)	23.2 (73.8)	23.1 (73.6)	23.0 (73.4)	23.0 (73.4)	23.1 (73.6)	23.1 (73.6)	23.1 (73.6)	23.1 (73.6)	23.1 (73.6)
Average precipitation mm (inches)	379.7 (14.95)	295.1 (11.62)	352.7 (13.89)	349.8 (13.77)	275.1 (10.83)	243.0 (9.57)	218.5 (8.60)	214.3 (8.44)	260.6 (10.26)	347.8 (13.69)	406.7 (16.01)	422.0 (16.61)	3,765.3 (148.24)
Average precipitation days (≥ 1.0 mm)	20.9	16.6	19.0	19.8	16.6	14.0	14.3	12.0	14.8	19.4	21.7	22.4	211.5
Source: World Meteorological Organization

== Transportation ==
Nanga Pinoh can be reached by air through Nanga Pinoh Airport, though flights are infrequent and the airport has limited destinations. A bus station is located just north of the town centre.
