= Tabalong River =

River in Kalimantan (Indonesian Borneo)

Coordinates: 2.4205°S 115.2631°E

Tabalong River Batang Tabalon, Batang Tabalong, Sungai Tabalon
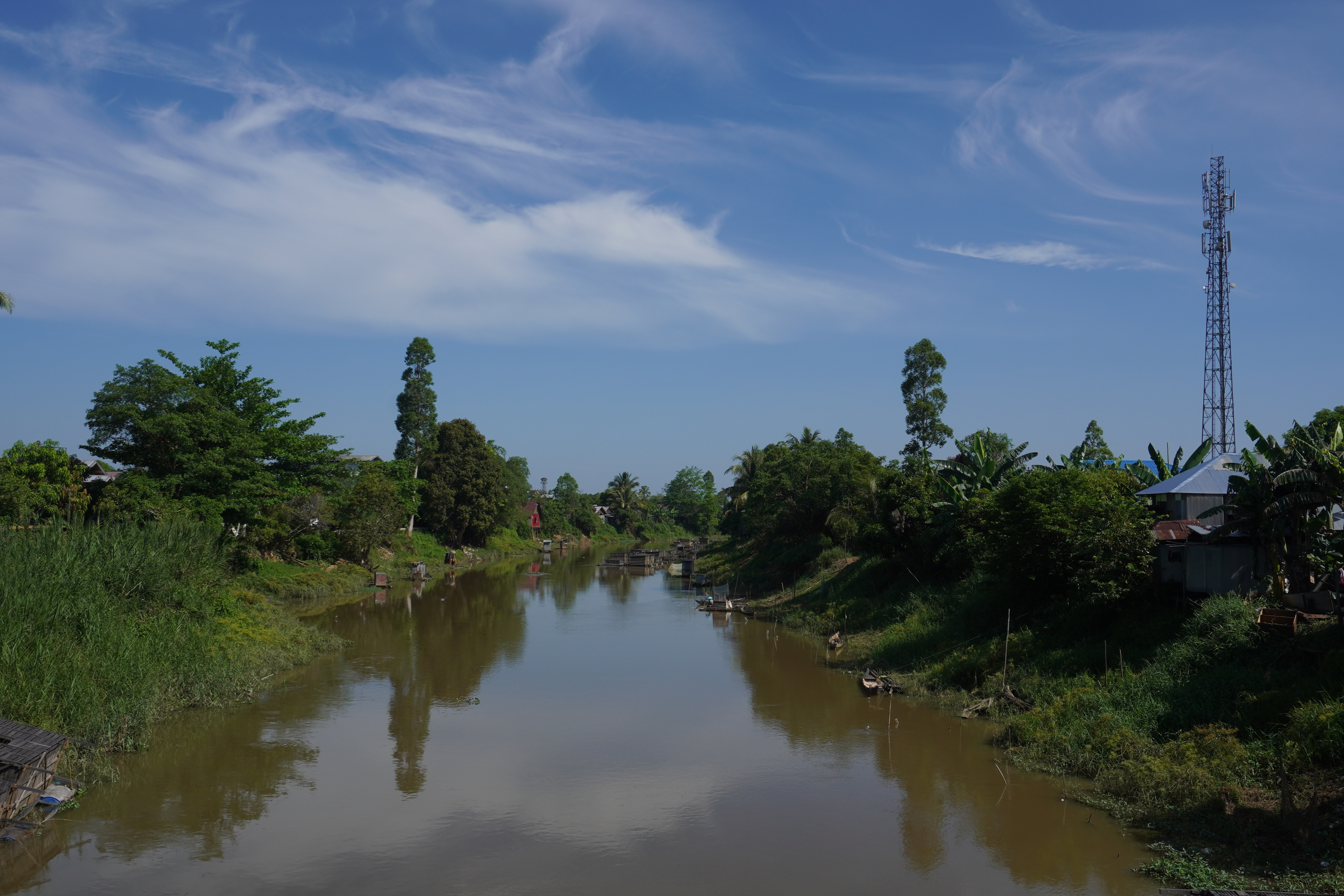

- River mouth location in Kalimantan

Physical characteristics
- Source: confluence of the Left Tabalong River and Right Tabalong River
  - location: Tabalong Regency
- Mouth: Negara River
  - location: Amuntai
- Length: 45 km (28 mi)
- Width
  - average: 80 m (260 ft)
- Depth
  - average: 3.5 m (11 ft)

Basin features
- River system: Tabalong
- Tributaries
  - left: Bentot River; Anyar River

The Tabalong River (Indonesian: Sungai Tabalong; Banjar: Batang Tabalong) is a river traversing Tabalong Regency, in the province of South Kalimantan, Indonesia. The river flows into the Negara River. It is a confluence of two tributaries: the Left Tabalong and Right Tabalong rivers.

The river has a length of 45 km, width of 80 metres and average depth of 3.5 metres.

== Geography ==
Tabalong River

Climate chart (precipitation, max. and min. temperature)
J	F	M	A	M	J	J	A	S	O	N	D
310 25 20	344 27 22	377 27 22	282 26 22	236 26 22	193 29 22	153 27 21	122 28 22	101 30 20	136 30 20	337 27 21	392 26 21
- █ Average max. and min. temperatures in °C
- █ Precipitation totals in mm
Imperial conversion
J	F	M	A	M	J	J	A	S	O	N	D
12 77 68	14 81 72	15 81 72	11 79 72	9.3 79 72	7.6 84 72	6 81 70	4.8 82 72	4 86 68	5.4 86 68	13 81 70	15 79 70
- █ Average max. and min. temperatures in °F
- █ Precipitation totals in inches

The river flows in the southeast area of Borneo island with predominantly tropical rainforest climate (designated as Af in the Köppen-Geiger climate classification). The annual average temperature in the area is 24 °C. The warmest month is June, when the average temperature is around 26 °C, and the coldest is January, at 22 °C. The average annual rainfall is 2982 mm. The wettest month is December, with an average of 392 mm rainfall, and the driest is September, with 101 mm rainfall.

== Use ==
The Tabalong River provides a large swamp land, which can be used to grow rice during the dry season. However, during the wet season, the discharge of the river and its tributaries increases so high, that it often threatened the harvest and caused flooding in the nearby villages. Therefore, the local government builds flood gates to control the flow and prevent floods.

The abundance of water during the wet season is actually useful to fill up the pools for fishery.

== See also ==
- List of drainage basins of Indonesia
- List of rivers of Indonesia
- List of rivers of Kalimantan
