= Melawi River =

Coordinates: 0°5′0″N 111°29′0″E

Melawi River Sungai Melawi, Sungai Melawasi, Sungai Batang Lawai, Belitang Lawai
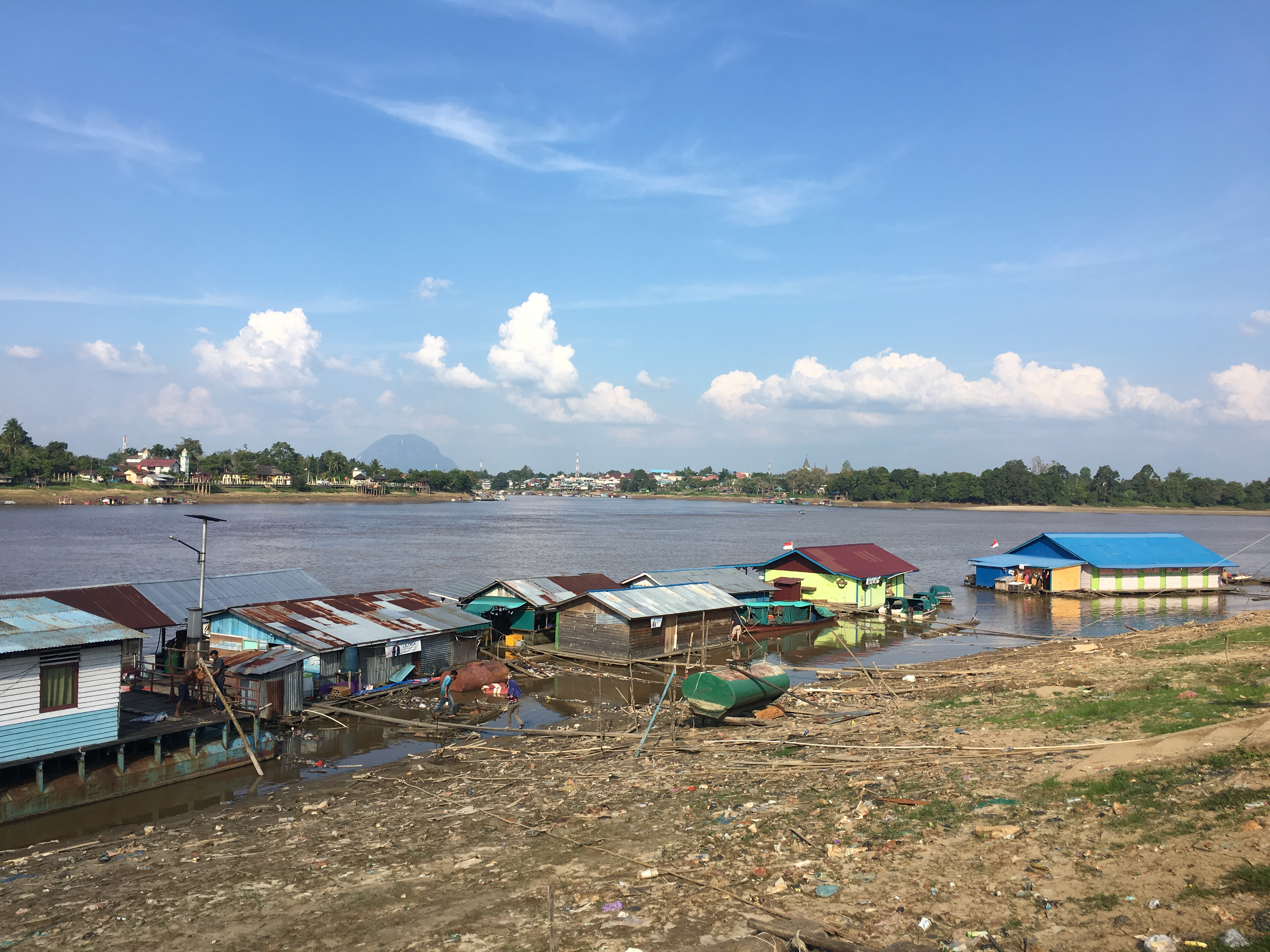

- Location of river mouth Melawi River (Indonesia)

Location
- Country: Indonesia
- Province: West Kalimantan

Physical characteristics
- Source: Nokan Nayan waterfall, Ambalau,
  - location: Sintang Regency
- Mouth: Kapuas River
  - location: Sintang

Melawi River is a river in north-western Borneo, Indonesia, about 900 km northeast of the capital Jakarta. It is a tributary of the Kapuas River.

The people in the upper reaches of the Melawi speak Ot Danum and elsewhere along the river speak variants of the Malay language. The river banks are inhabited by the Malay and Dayak ethnic groups. A major town on the river is Nanga Pinoh, the capital of Melawi Regency.

== Hydrology ==
The river meets the Kapuas in the town of Sintang.

== Geography ==
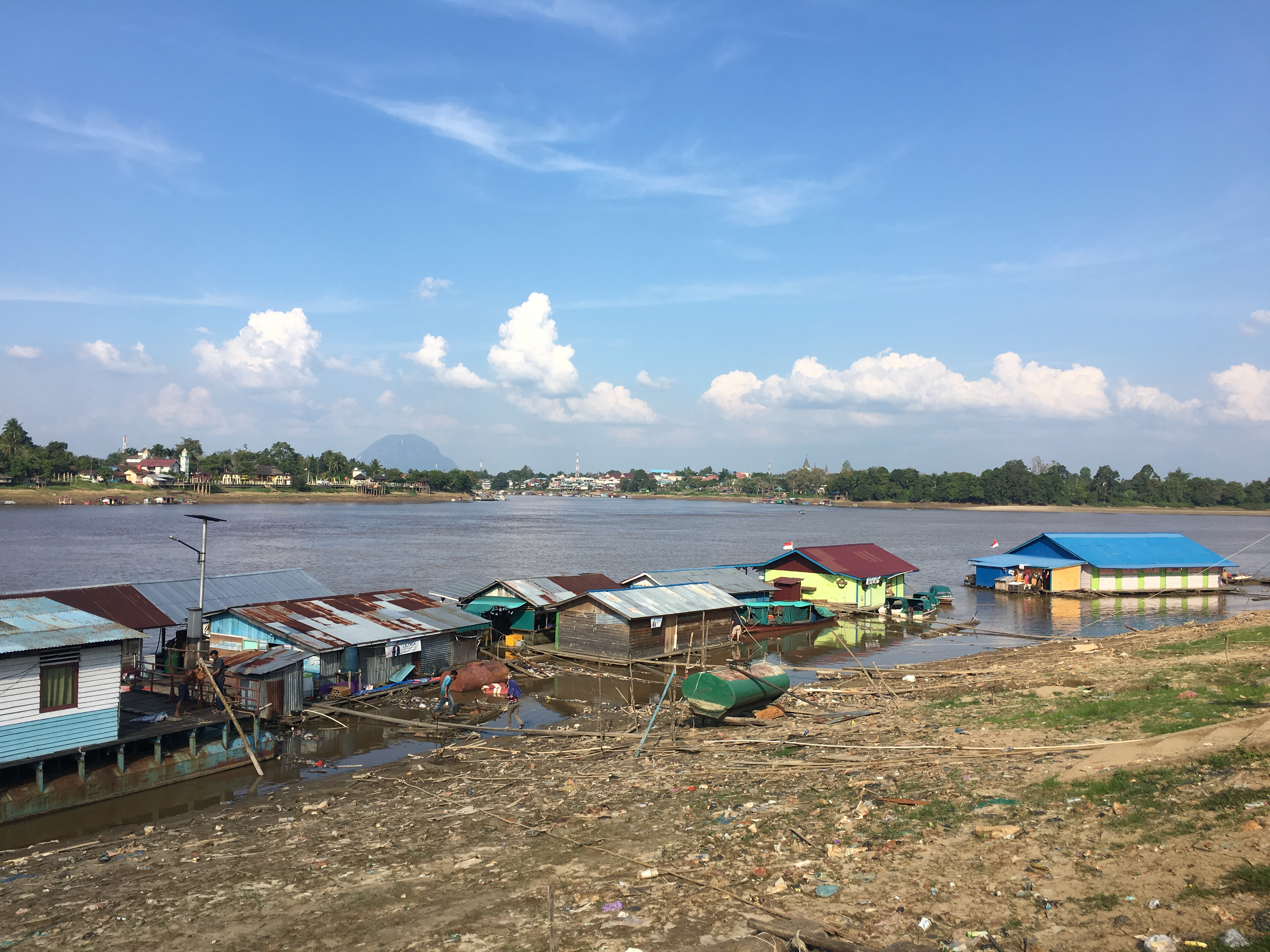
Melawi's confluence with Kapuas at Sintang

The river flows in the western area of Borneo with a predominantly tropical rainforest climate (designated as Af in the Köppen-Geiger climate classification). The annual average temperature in the area is 23 °C. The warmest month is May, when the average temperature is around 24 °C, and the coldest is February, at 22 °C. The average annual rainfall is 4124 mm. The wettest month is November, with an average of 523 mm rainfall, and the driest is June, with 212 mm rainfall.

== See also ==
- List of drainage basins of Indonesia
- List of rivers of Indonesia
- List of rivers of Kalimantan
