= Berau River =

River in East Kalimantan, Indonesia

- Location of the river mouth Berau River (Indonesia)

Location
- Country: Indonesia
- Province: East Kalimantan

Physical characteristics
- Source
  - location: Borneo
  - elevation: 1,800 m (5,900 ft)
- Mouth: Celebes Sea
  - coordinates: 2°10′37″N 117°55′52″E
- Length: 300 km (190 mi)
- Basin size: 16,993 km^{2} (6,561 mi^{2})
- Discharge
  - location: Gunung Tabur, Kalimantan Timur
  - average: (Period of data: 1998-2007)703 m^{3}/s (24,800 cu ft/s) (Year: 2007)605 m^{3}/s (21,400 cu ft/s)
  - minimum: 200 m^{3}/s (7,100 cu ft/s)
  - maximum: 2,896 m^{3}/s (102,300 cu ft/s)

Basin features
- River system: Berau basin (DAS320058)

Berau River is a river of East Kalimantan Province of Indonesia, about 300 kilometers (190 miles) north of the provincial capital Samarinda. It is formed from the major tributaries of the Segah River which flows from the western part of the river basin, to be joined at Tanjung Redeb by the Kelai River coming in from the south. The 16,993 km^{2} river basin is largely contained within the Berau Regency in the north of East Kalimantan.

== Geography ==
The river flows in the eastern area of Kalimantan with a predominantly tropical rainforest climate (designated as Af in the Köppen-Geiger climate classification). The annual average temperature in the area is 23 °C (73 °F). The warmest month is April, when the average temperature is around 24 °C (75 °F), and the coldest is January, at 22 °C (72 °F). The average annual rainfall is 2,835 millimeters (111.6 inches). The wettest month is December, with an average of 332-millimeter (13.1 in) rainfall, and the driest is August, with 154-millimeter (6.1 in) rainfall.

Berau River

Climate chart (precipitation, max. and min. temperature)
J	F	M	A	M	J	J	A	S	O	N	D
287 24 21	300 23 22	250 24 22	186 24 23	251 24 23	193 24 22	198 24 22	154 25 22	211 24 24	189 24 23	283 23 22	332 23 22
- █ Average max. and min. temperatures in °C
- █ Precipitation totals in mm
Imperial conversion
J	F	M	A	M	J	J	A	S	O	N	D
11 75 70	12 73 72	9.8 75 72	7.3 75 73	9.9 75 73	7.6 75 72	7.8 75 72	6.1 77 72	8.3 75 75	7.4 75 73	11 73 72	13 73 72
- █ Average max. and min. temperatures in °F
- █ Precipitation totals in inches

== See also ==
- List of drainage basins of Indonesia
- List of rivers of Indonesia
- List of rivers of Kalimantan
