= Kaso River, Borneo =

Coordinates: 0.76667°S 114.13333°E

Kaso River Sungai Kaso, Sungai Kacu, Soengai Kasau, Sungai Kasso, Soengai Kasso
- Location of river mouth Kaso River, Borneo (Indonesia)

Location
- Country: Indonesia
- Province: East Kalimantan

Physical characteristics
- Source
  - location: Borneo

The Kaso River (Sungai Kaso or Kacu) is a stream in the Indonesian part of the island of Borneo, about 1100 km northeast of the Indonesian capital Jakarta. One of its tributaries is the Seputan River. The Kaso flows into the Mahakam River. In 1889, Tromp reported three villages of Bukat people on the Kaso. The villages were on the Penane River, a tributary of the Kacu at Long Mecai. The semi-nomadic Seputan people also live on the Kacu at times.

== Geography ==
The river flows in the central area of Borneo with a predominantly tropical rainforest climate (designated as Af in the Köppen-Geiger climate classification). The annual average temperature in the area is 21 °C. The warmest month is September when the average temperature is around 22 °C, and the coldest is June, at 20 °C. The average annual rainfall is 4449 mm. The wettest month is November, with an average of 554 mm of rainfall, and the driest is October, with 235 mm of rainfall.

== See also ==
- List of drainage basins of Indonesia
- List of rivers of Indonesia
- List of rivers of Kalimantan
