= Sampit River (Indonesia) =

Sampit River Sungai Sampit, Sampit-Rivier Mentaya River, Soengai Mentaja Soengai Mantaja
- River mouth location Sampit River (Indonesia) (Indonesia)

Location
- Country: Indonesia

Physical characteristics
- Source
  - location: Central Kalimantan, Borneo
- Mouth: Sampit Bay (Java Sea)
  - location: Kuala Sampit
  - coordinates: 2°58′20″S 113°2′23″E
- Length: 270 km (170 mi)
- Basin size: 14,000 km^{2} (5,400 mi^{2}) 14,605 km^{2} (5,639 mi^{2})
- Discharge
  - location: Java Sea (near mouth)
  - average: 1,064.4 m^{3}/s (37,590 cu ft/s)
- Discharge
  - location: Sampit (Basin size: 12,360 km^{2} (4,770 sq mi)
  - average: 1,431 m^{3}/s (50,500 cu ft/s)

Basin features
- River system: Mentaya basin

The Sampit River or Mentaya River is a river of Central Kalimantan, Borneo, Indonesia. The river takes its name from the town of Sampit which lies on the river not far from the Java Sea. Near the mouth of the river is a noted beach park named "Pandaran Beach". The Sampit flows into the Java Sea at 2°58′20″S 113°2′23″E.

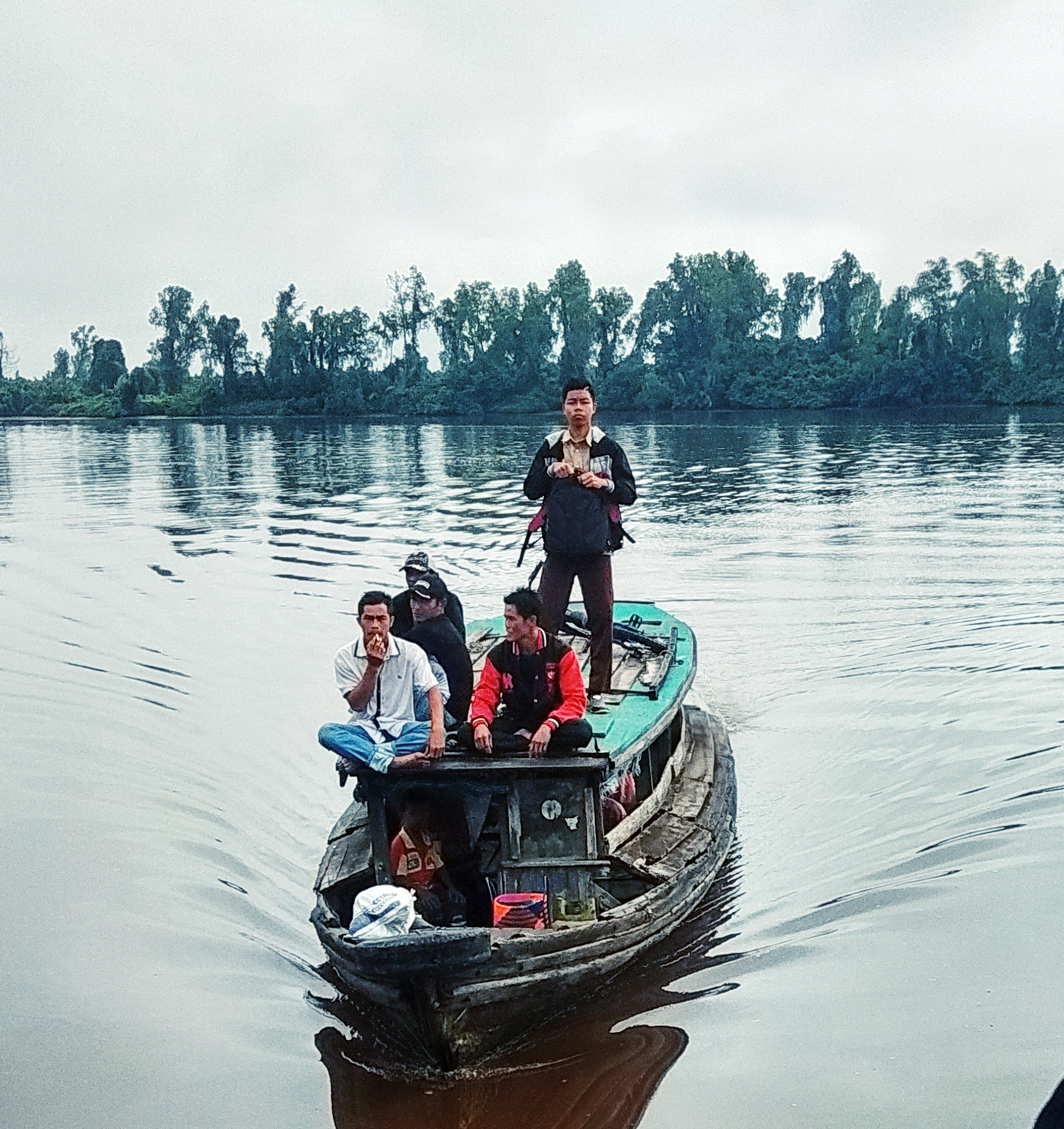
Workers on a klotok, a traditional river ferry, Sampit River

== Geography ==
The river flows in the midsouthern area of Borneo island with predominantly tropical rainforest climate (designated as Af in the Köppen-Geiger climate classification). The annual average temperature in the area is 23 °C. The warmest month is July, when the average temperature is around 25 °C, and the coldest is November, at 22 °C. The average annual rainfall is 2,991 mm. The wettest month is December, with an average of 476 mm rainfall, and the driest is September, with 82 mm rainfall.

== See also ==
- List of drainage basins of Indonesia
- List of rivers of Indonesia
- List of rivers of Kalimantan
