= Telen River (Indonesia) =

River in East Kalimantan, Indonesia

Coordinates: 0.43333°N 116.7°E

Telen River Sungai Telen, Tilin
- Location of river mouth Telen River (Indonesia) (Indonesia)

Location
- Country: Indonesia

Physical characteristics
- Source
  - location: Borneo

The Telen River is a river in East Kalimantan, Borneo island, Indonesia, about 110 kilometers (68 miles) north of the provincial capital Samarinda. It is a tributary of the Mahakam River.

== Geography ==
The river flows in the eastern area of Borneo with a predominantly tropical rainforest climate (designated as Af in the Köppen-Geiger climate classification). The annual average temperature in the area is 23 °C (73 °F). The warmest month is May, when the average temperature is around 24 °C (75 °F), and the coldest is July, at 22 °C (72 °F). The average annual rainfall is 2932 mm. The wettest month is February, with an average of 362-millimeter (14.3 in) of rainfall, and the driest is September, with a 132-millimeter (5.2 in) of rainfall.

Telen River

Climate chart (precipitation, max. and min. temperature)
J	F	M	A	M	J	J	A	S	O	N	D
303 25 21	362 25 21	247 24 22	305 25 21	286 25 22	232 25 21	150 24 21	155 25 20	132 26 20	136 25 20	290 26 19	334 24 20
- █ Average max. and min. temperatures in °C
- █ Precipitation totals in mm
Imperial conversion
J	F	M	A	M	J	J	A	S	O	N	D
12 77 70	14 77 70	9.7 75 72	12 77 70	11 77 72	9.1 77 70	5.9 75 70	6.1 77 68	5.2 79 68	5.4 77 68	11 79 66	13 75 68
- █ Average max. and min. temperatures in °F
- █ Precipitation totals in inches

== See also ==
- List of drainage basins of Indonesia
- List of rivers of Indonesia
- List of rivers of Kalimantan
