= Bahau River =

Coordinates: 2.56935°N 116.45394°E

Bahau River Sungai Bahau
- Location of river mouth Bahau River (Indonesia)

Location
- Country: Indonesia
- Province: North Kalimantan

Physical characteristics
- Source
  - location: Borneo
- Mouth: Kayan River

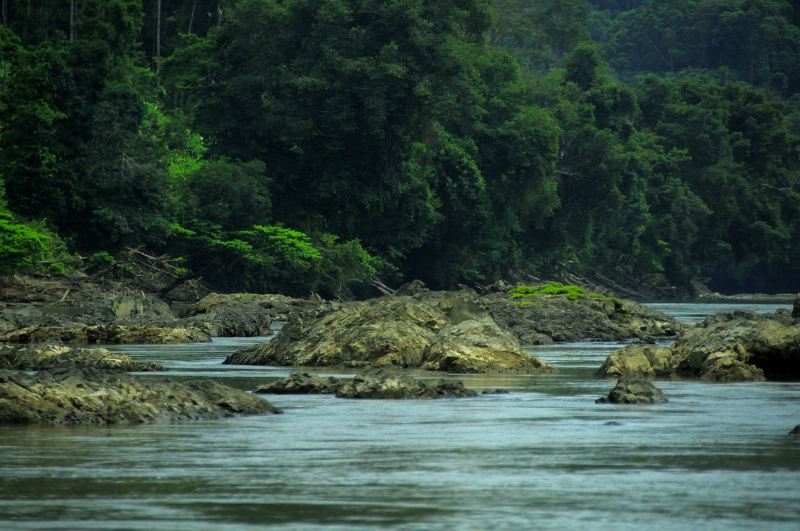

The Bahau River is a river in North Kalimantan, Indonesia, about 1400 km northeast of the capital Jakarta.

The river is deemed a tributary of the Kayan River.

== Geography ==
The river flows in the northeast area of Kalimantan with a predominantly tropical rainforest climate (designated as Af in the Köppen-Geiger climate classification). The annual average temperature in the area is 20 °C. The warmest month is October when the average temperature is around 22 °C, and the coldest is July, at 19 °C. The average annual rainfall is 3957 mm. The wettest month is September, with an average of 446 mm rainfall, and the driest is April, with 269 mm rainfall.

Bahau River

Climate chart (precipitation, max. and min. temperature)
| J | F | M | A | M | J | J | A | S | O | N | D |
| 329 21 18 | 324 22 20 | 302 21 18 | 269 23 19 | 345 22 20 | 321 20 19 | 316 21 17 | 274 22 19 | 446 22 18 | 323 23 21 | 352 21 19 | 355 21 19 |
- █ Average max. and min. temperatures in °C
- █ Precipitation totals in mm
Imperial conversion
| J | F | M | A | M | J | J | A | S | O | N | D |
| 13 70 64 | 13 72 68 | 12 70 64 | 11 73 66 | 14 72 68 | 13 68 66 | 12 70 63 | 11 72 66 | 18 72 64 | 13 73 70 | 14 70 66 | 14 70 66 |
- █ Average max. and min. temperatures in °F
- █ Precipitation totals in inches

== See also ==
- List of drainage basins of Indonesia
- List of rivers of Indonesia
- List of rivers of Kalimantan
