= Keriau River =

Coordinates: 1.21667°S 110.56667°E

- River mouth location Keriau River (Indonesia)

Location
- Country: Indonesia

Physical characteristics
- Source
  - location: West Kalimantan, Borneo
- Mouth: Pawan River
- Length: 197 kilometres (122 miles)

The Keriau or Krio River is a tributary of the Pawan River in West Kalimantan, Indonesia.

== Hydrology ==
The upper course of the river was the location of the Ulu Aik Kingdom (est. around 1700), later renamed Hulu Aik.

The Krio River rapids are reached by starting from Pontianak in the direction of Ketapang by speedboat for six hours, then a four-hour trip in a smaller boat.

== Geography ==
The river flows in the western area of Borneo island with predominantly tropical rainforest climate (designated as Af in the Köppen-Geiger climate classification). The annual average temperature in the area is 23 °C. The warmest month is May, when the average temperature is around 24 °C, and the coldest is December, at 22 °C. The average annual rainfall is 3726 mm. The wettest month is December, with an average of 495 mm rainfall, and the driest is August, with 160 mm rainfall.

== See also ==
- List of rivers of Indonesia
- List of rivers of Kalimantan
