= Kelai River =

River in East Kalimantan, Indonesia

Coordinates: 2.16667°N 117.48333°E

Kelai River Sungai Kelai, Kilai
- Location of river mouth Kelai River (Indonesia)

Location
- Country: Indonesia

Physical characteristics
- Source
  - location: Borneo
- Mouth: Berau River

The Kelai River is a river of Borneo, in the Indonesian province of East Kalimantan, about 300 kilometers (190 mi) north of the provincial capital Samarinda. It is a tributary of the Berau River, which is formed at Tanjung Redep by the merger of the Segah River from the west with the Kelai River from the south.

== Geography ==
The river flows in the eastern area of Kalimantan with a predominantly tropical rainforest climate (designated as Af in the Köppen-Geiger climate classification). The annual average temperature in the area is 23 °C (73 °F). The warmest month is September, when the average temperature is around 26 °C (79 °F), and the coldest is January, at 22 °C (72 °F). The average annual rainfall is 2,835 millimeters (111.6 inches). The wettest month is December, with an average of 332-millimeter (13.1 in) rainfall, and the driest is August, with 154-millimeter (6.1 in) rainfall.

Kelai River

Climate chart (precipitation, max. and min. temperature)
J	F	M	A	M	J	J	A	S	O	N	D
287 23 21	300 26 20	250 25 22	186 25 22	251 24 22	193 24 22	198 24 22	154 25 21	211 27 24	189 25 22	283 24 22	332 23 21
- █ Average max. and min. temperatures in °C
- █ Precipitation totals in mm
Imperial conversion
J	F	M	A	M	J	J	A	S	O	N	D
11 73 70	12 79 68	9.8 77 72	7.3 77 72	9.9 75 72	7.6 75 72	7.8 75 72	6.1 77 70	8.3 81 75	7.4 77 72	11 75 72	13 73 70
- █ Average max. and min. temperatures in °F
- █ Precipitation totals in inches

== See also ==
- List of rivers of Indonesia
- List of rivers of Kalimantan
