= Lawa River (Indonesia) =

River in East Kalimantan, Indonesia

Coordinates: 0.46667°S 115.75°E

Lawa River Sungai Lawa
- Location of river mouth Lawa River (Indonesia) (Indonesia)

Location
- Country: Indonesia
- Province: East Kalimantan

Physical characteristics
- Mouth: Mahakam River

The Lawa River is a river in East Kalimantan province, Borneo island, Indonesia, about 150 kilometers (93 miles) northwest of Balikpapan. It is a branch of the Mahakam River in eastern Borneo, which is situated entirely within the Kutai Barat and flows into the Mahakam approximately 200 kilometers (120 mi) upstream from Samarinda. The indigenous communities of Lotaq and Mejaun (The Dayaks) are situated near its source.

== Geography ==
The river flows in the eastern area of Borneo with a predominantly tropical rainforest climate (designated as Af in the Köppen-Geiger climate classification). The annual average temperature in the area is 23 °C (73 °F). The warmest month is October, when the average temperature is around 24 °C (75 °F), and the coldest is February, at 22 °C (72 °F). The average annual rainfall is 2,939 millimeters (115.7 inches). The wettest month is November, with an average of 354-millimeter (13.9 in) of rainfall, and the driest is August, with a 124-millimeter (4.9 in) of rainfall.

== See also ==
- List of drainage basins of Indonesia
- List of rivers of Indonesia
- List of rivers of Kalimantan
