= Sekayam River =

River in Indonesia

Coordinates: 0.11667°N 110.63333°E

Sekayam River Sungai Sekayam, Sungai Sekajam, Soengai Sekajan
- River mouth location Sekayam River (Indonesia)

Location
- Country: Indonesia

Physical characteristics
- Source
  - location: Borneo
- Mouth: Kapuas River
  - location: Sanggau

Basin features
- River system: Kapuas basin (DAS320470)

Sekayam River is a river of Borneo, West Kalimantan province, Indonesia. It is a tributary of the Kapuas River. The Public Forest System Utility Program (Program Pemberdayaan Sistem Hutan Kerakyatan; PPSHK) has a scheme on the river aimed at reducing the level of mercury content absorbed by humans.

== Hydrology ==
The river flows through the dense rainforest of Borneo. The Entabai River enters the Sekayam River.

== Geography ==
The river flows in the western area of Borneo island with a predominantly tropical rainforest climate (designated as Af in the Köppen-Geiger climate classification). The annual average temperature in the area is 23 °C. The warmest month is August when the average temperature is around 24 °C, and the coldest is November, at 20 °C. The average annual rainfall is 3680 mm. The wettest month is December, with an average of 466 mm of rainfall, and the driest is June, with 181 mm of rainfall.

== Use ==
During the 1880s the river was exploited for its Cinnabar and antimony in its far upper course.

== See also ==
- List of drainage basins of Indonesia
- List of rivers of Indonesia
- List of rivers of Kalimantan
