= Martapura River =

River in Kalimantan (Indonesian Borneo)

Coordinates: 3.2919°S 114.5811°E

Martapura River Sungai Banjar Kecil, Sungai Kayutangi Sungai Cina, Sungai Tatas, Soengai Martapoera
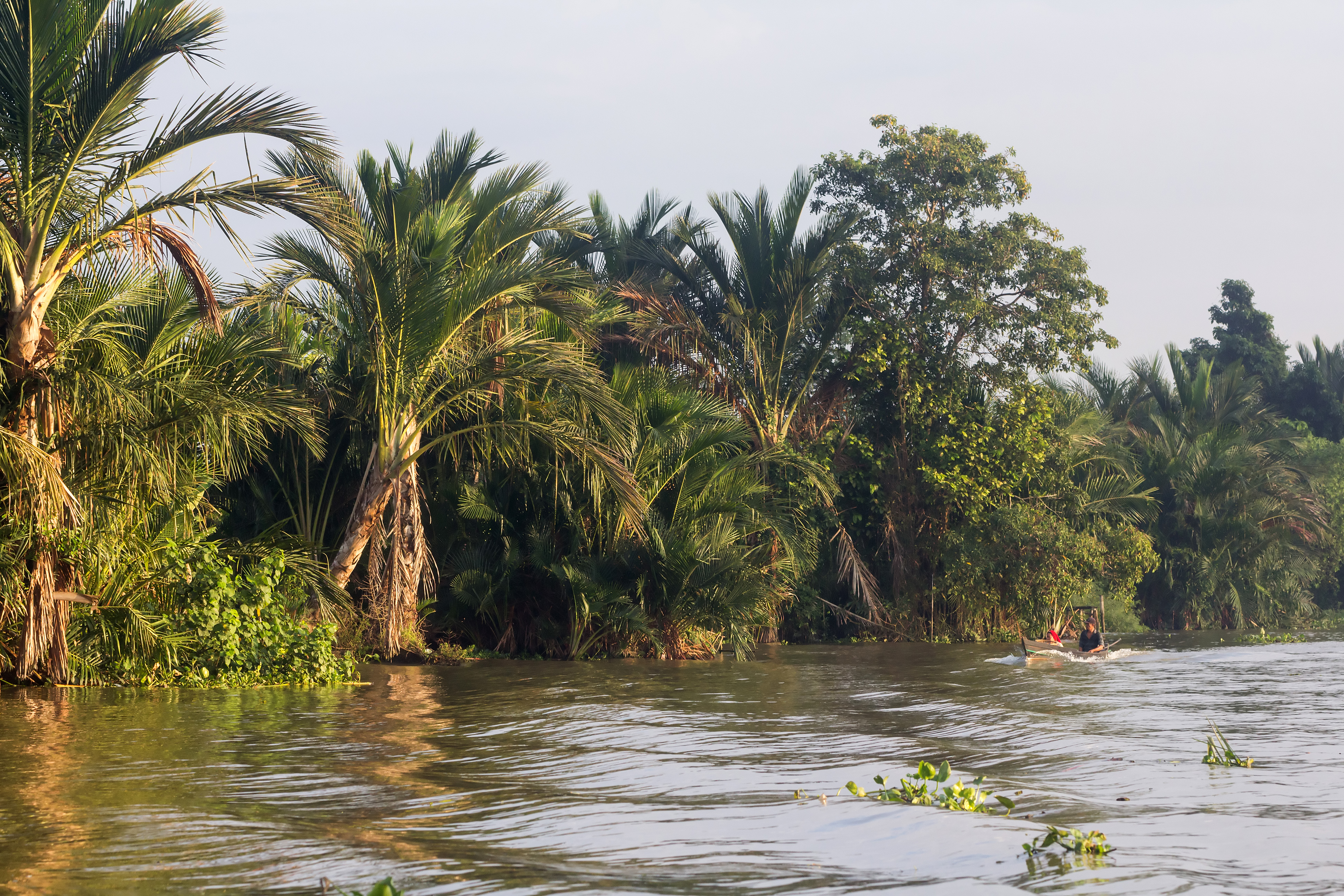
- Martapura River outside Banjarmasin
- Native name: Sungai Martapura (Indonesian)

Location
- Country: Indonesia
- Province: South Kalimantan

Physical characteristics
- Source
  - location: Martapura, Banjar Regency
- Mouth: Barito River

The Martapura River (Indonesian: Sungai Martapura) is a river in southeast Borneo, Indonesia. It is a tributary of the Barito River. Other names for the river are Banjar Kecil River or Kayutangi River and due to many activities of Chinese merchants in the past in the downstream area also called China River. It merges with the Barito River in Banjarmasin, flowing from the source in Martapura, Banjar Regency, South Kalimantan.

== Etymology ==
The river name is taken from the city of Martapura, which was the capital of Banjar Kingdom in around 1630, specifically in the area of Kayu Tangi (hence also the name "Kayutangi River"). Another name is "Tatas River" (Indonesian: Sungai Tatas), pointing to the delta Tatas, which in 1787 was acquired by the Dutch East India Company (now the downtown of modern-day Banjarmasin).

== Hydrology ==
The watershed area (Indonesian: daerah aliran sungai) of Martapura is 453.88 square kilometers (175.24 sq mi), with the main river length of 36,566 meters (119,967 feet), and with all tributaries has a total length of 375.91 kilometers (233.58 mi), giving a river density level of 0.828 km/km^{2} (1.333 mi/sq mi). The elevation difference between the upstream and downstream is 8.00 meters (26.25 ft), yielding a river gradient of 0.022%. The upstream area is the Riam Kanan Dam.

== Geography ==
The river flows in the southeast area of Borneo with a predominantly tropical rainforest climate (designated as Af in the Köppen-Geiger climate classification). The annual average temperature in the area is 25 °C (77 °F). The warmest month is October, when the average temperature is around 28 °C (82 °F), and the coldest is July, at 24 °C (75 °F). The average annual rainfall is 2,767 millimeters (108.9 in). The wettest month is February, with an average of 366-millimeter (14.4 in) rainfall, and the driest is September, with a 75-millimeter (3.0 in) rainfall.

== Gallery ==
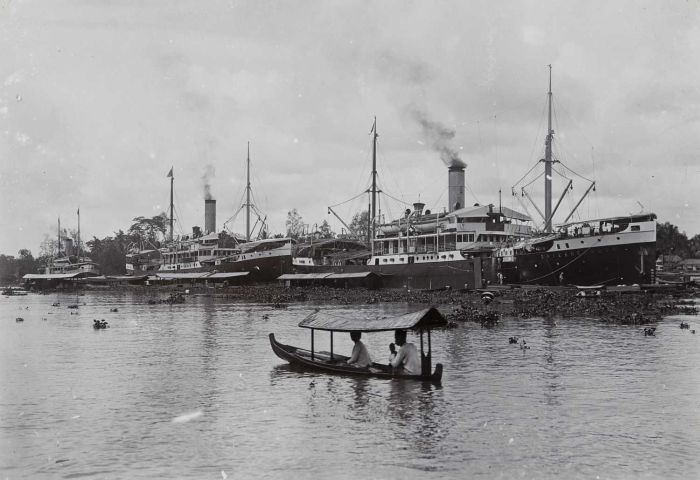
KPM ship at the dock of the Martapura River in Banjarmasin

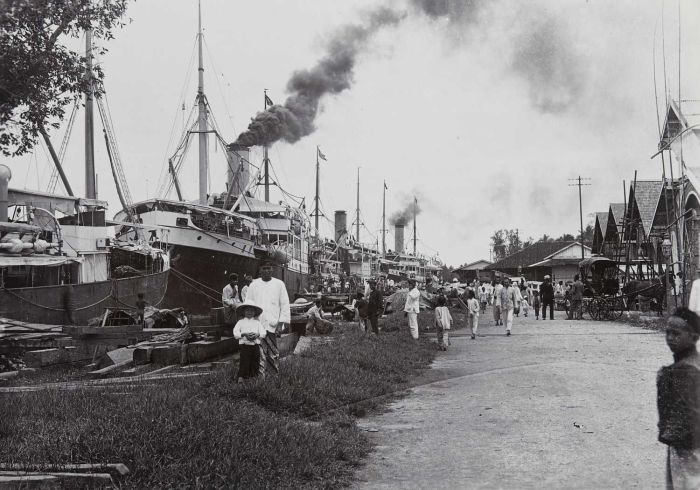
KPM ship at the dock of the Martapura River in Banjarmasin

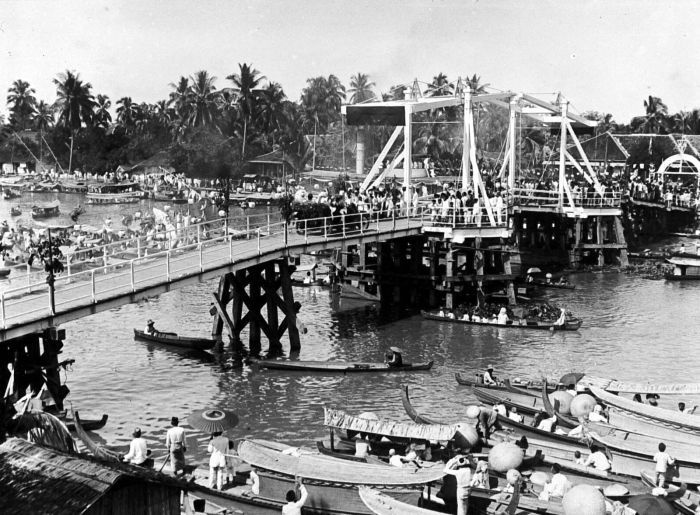
A bridge over the Martapura River in Banjarmasin

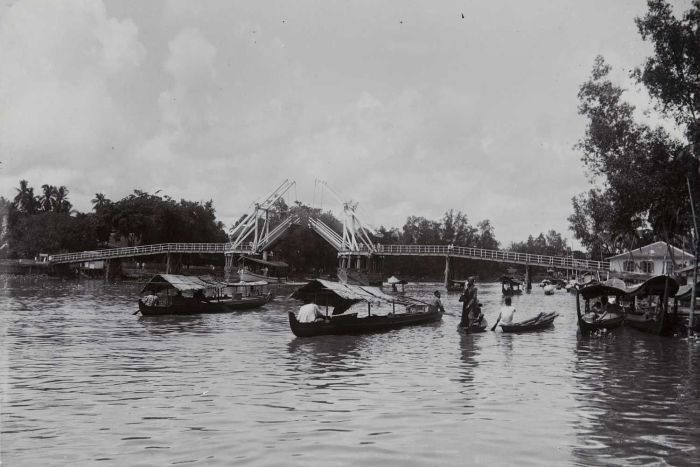
Martapura River in Banjarmasin

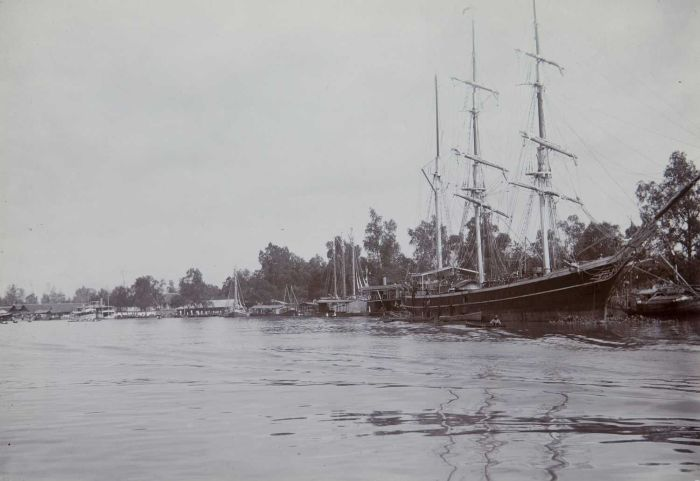
Martapura River

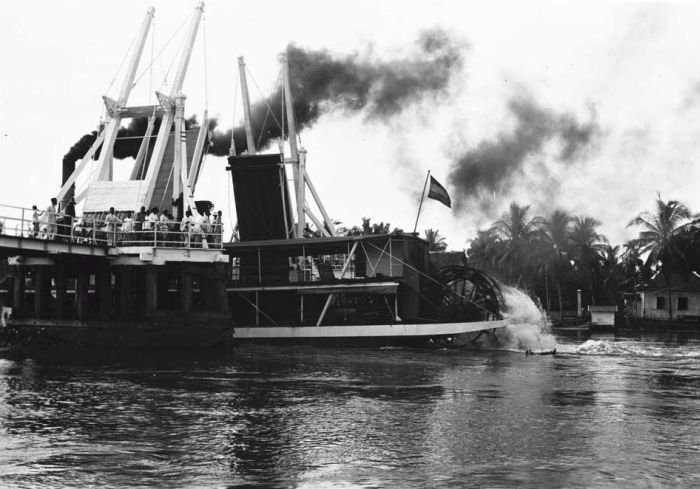
Martapura River

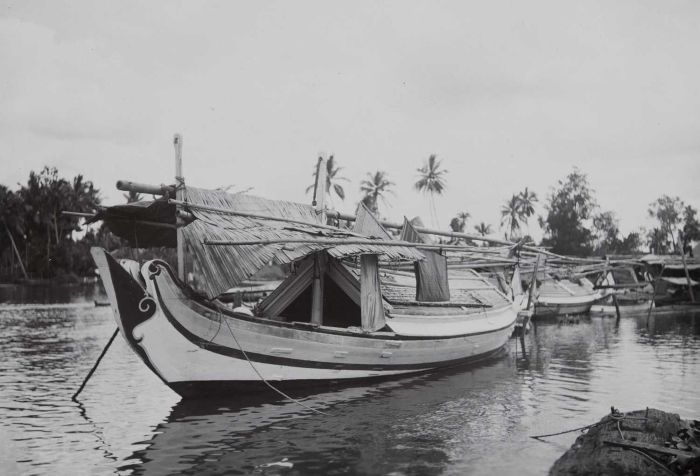
Madurese ship (golekan) docking in the bank of the Martapura River

== See also ==
- List of drainage basins of Indonesia
- List of rivers of Indonesia
- List of rivers of Kalimantan
