= Barito River =

Major river in Kalimantan (Indonesian Borneo)

Barito River Sungai Barito, Sungai Dusun, Sungi Banjer, Sungi Dunsun, Sungai Baritu, Sungai Banjar, Sungai Banjarmasin, Sungai Banjar Besar
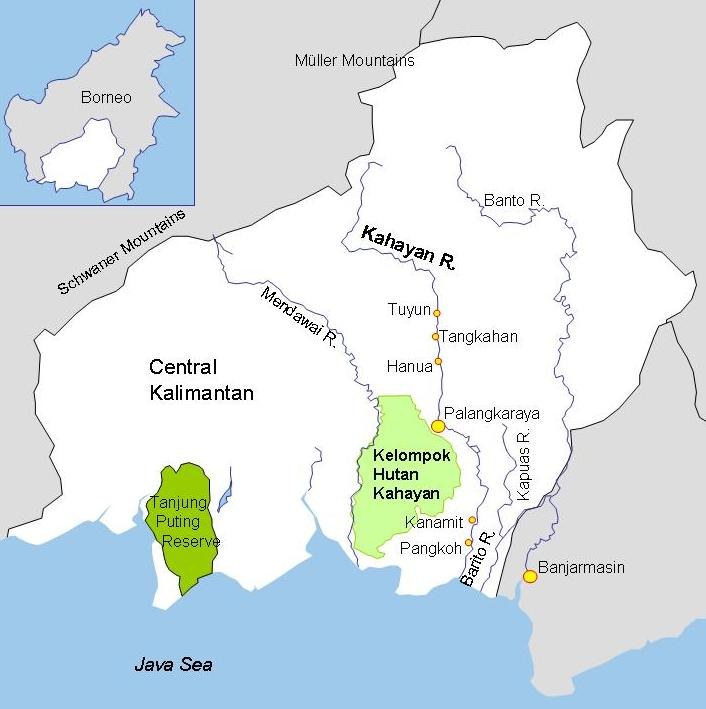
- Barito and other rivers in Central and South Kalimantan

- Location of river mouth Barito River (Indonesia)

Location
- Country: Indonesia

Physical characteristics
- Source: Murung River
  - location: Müller Mountain Range
- Mouth
  - location: Java Sea
  - coordinates: 3°30′55″S 114°29′28″E
  - elevation: 0 m (0 ft)
- Length: Barito–Murung 1,090 km (680 mi)
- Basin size: 81,675 km^{2} (31,535 mi^{2})
- Width
  - average: 250–400 m (820–1,310 ft)
- Depth
  - average: 8–18 m (26–59 ft)
- Discharge
  - location: Barito Delta
  - average: 4,514 m^{3}/s (159,400 cu ft/s)

Basin features
- Progression: Java Sea
- River system: Barito River
- Tributaries
  - left: Murung, Lampuya, Babuat, Laung, Lahei, Montallat, Tapen, Ajuh, Karau, Napu, Paminggir, Negara, Martapura
  - right: Joloi, Bakanon, Lemu, Muning, Mangkatip, Kapuas

Barito River in Kalimantan

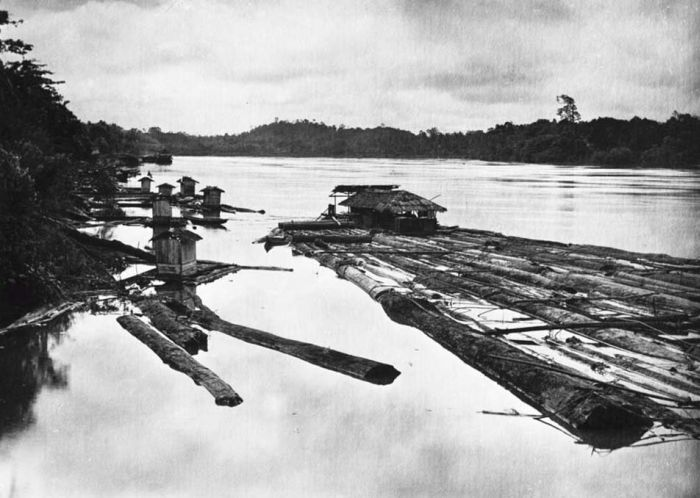
A timber raft on the Barito River with housing for the workers (ca.1905-14)

The Barito River is the second longest river in Borneo, Indonesia after the Kapuas River with a total length of 1,090 km (680 mi) and a drainage basin of over 80,000 km^{2} (31,000 mi^{2}) in South Kalimantan, Indonesia. It originates in the Müller Mountain Range, from where it flows southward into the Java Sea. Its most important affluent is the Negara and Martapura, and it passes through the city of Banjarmasin.

This river is the location of the closest relative of the Malagasy language of Madagascar, the Ma'anyan language of Dayaks, from where settlers arrived in Madagascar (presumably in waves) from the 3rd to 10th century and from which the current island nation's population largely traces its origins.

== Geography ==
The river flows in the southeast area of Borneo with a predominantly tropical rainforest climate (designated as Af in the Köppen-Geiger climate classification). The annual average temperature in the area is 24 °C (75 °F). The warmest month is October, when the average temperature is around 26 °C (79 °F), and the coldest is January, at 20 °C (68 °F). The average annual rainfall is 2,735–3,000 mm (107.7–118.1 in). The wettest month is December, with an average of 437 mm (17.2 in) rainfall, and the driest is September, with a 62 mm (2.4 in) rainfall.

== Discharge ==
Period	Discharge	Ref.
Barito Delta 3°30′55″S 114°29′28″E
2008–2015	5,497 m^{3}/s (194,100 cu ft/s)	
2003–2016	4,514 m^{3}/s (159,400 cu ft/s)	
1970–2000	129 km^{3}/a (4,100 m^{3}/s)	
Banjarmasin 3°21′48.3516″S 114°31′20.28″E
2006–2011	4,502 m^{3}/s (159,000 cu ft/s)	
Muara Teweh 0°57′28.656″S 114°52′54.7932″E
1971–2000	1,815.85 m^{3}/s (64,126 cu ft/s)	

== Tributaries ==
Left tributary	Right tributary	Length (km)	Basin size (km^{2})	Average discharge (m^{3}/s)
Barito		1,090	81,675	4,514
Martapura		61.25	3,791.3	171.8
Negara		128.25	10,757.6	413.8
	Kapuas	714.7	14,473.4	837.8
	Mengkatip		1,329.2	51.3
Paminggir			630.1	23.7
Napu		75.66	982.7	36.5
	Muning		605.4	24.9
Karau		94.9	1,822.1	68.9
Ajuh		94.66	1,360.3	61.2
Tapen			487.8	27.1
Montallat			853.9	48.5
	Lemu	51.28	558.9	34.7
Lahei		142.75	2,882.3	192.7
Laung		143.5	2,921.9	212.7
	Bakanon		363.8	25.9
Babuat		29.25	334.2	24.3
Lampuya			336.4	24.7
Murung		258	7,410.7	555.1
	Joloi (Djulai)	169.5	8,268.5	713.5

== Images ==
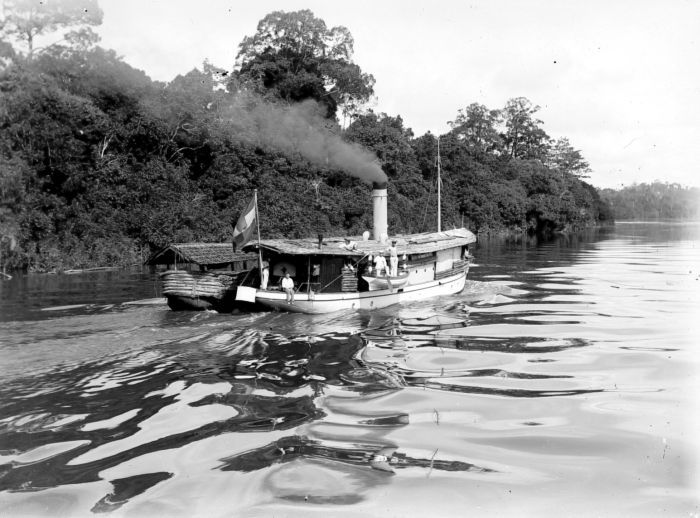
Dutch boat on the Barito River (1917)

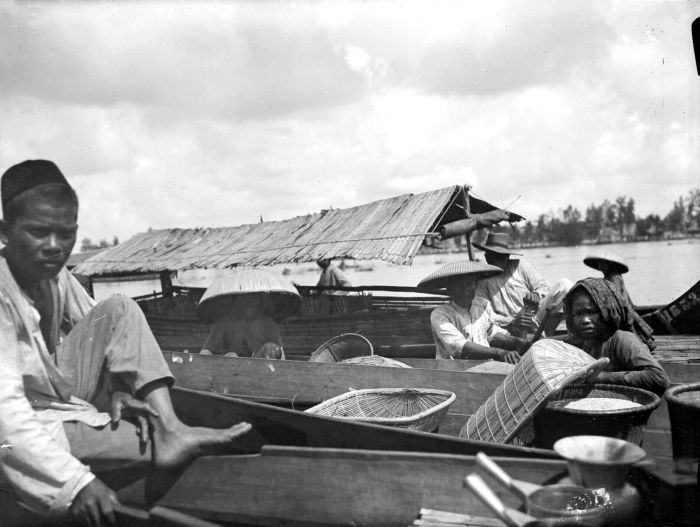
Inhabitants along the Barito

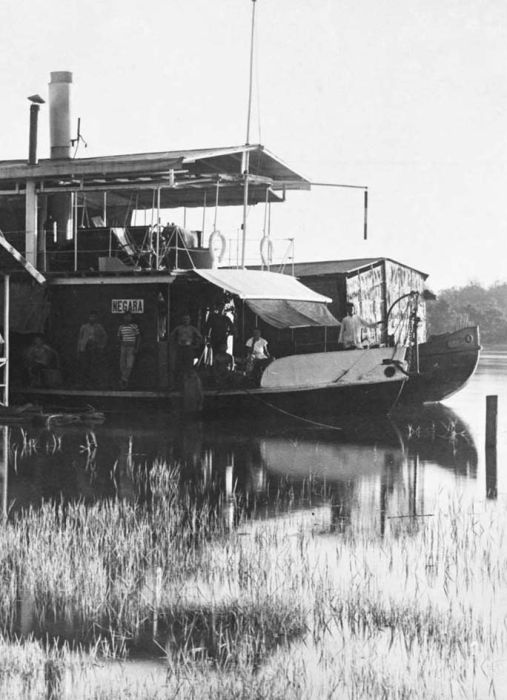
A boat on the Barito

== See also ==
- List of drainage basins of Indonesia
- List of rivers of Indonesia
- List of rivers of Kalimantan
