= Sembakung River =

Coordinates: 3.72698°N 117.8046°E

Sembakung River Sungai Sembakung, Sungai Sembakun, Simbakung, Soengai Sembakoeng
- River mouth location Sembakung River (Indonesia)

Location
- Country: Malaysian and Indonesia

Physical characteristics
- Source
  - location: Sabah, North Kalimantan
- Length: 322 km (200 mi)
- Basin size: 9,518.08 km^{2} (3,674.95 mi^{2})
- Discharge
  - location: Near mouth
  - average: (2008–2019)627.6 m^{3}/s (22,160 cu ft/s)
  - minimum: 62.11 m^{3}/s (2,193 cu ft/s)
  - maximum: 904.62 m^{3}/s (31,946 cu ft/s)

Basin features
- Progression: Sulawesi Sea
- River system: Sembakung River

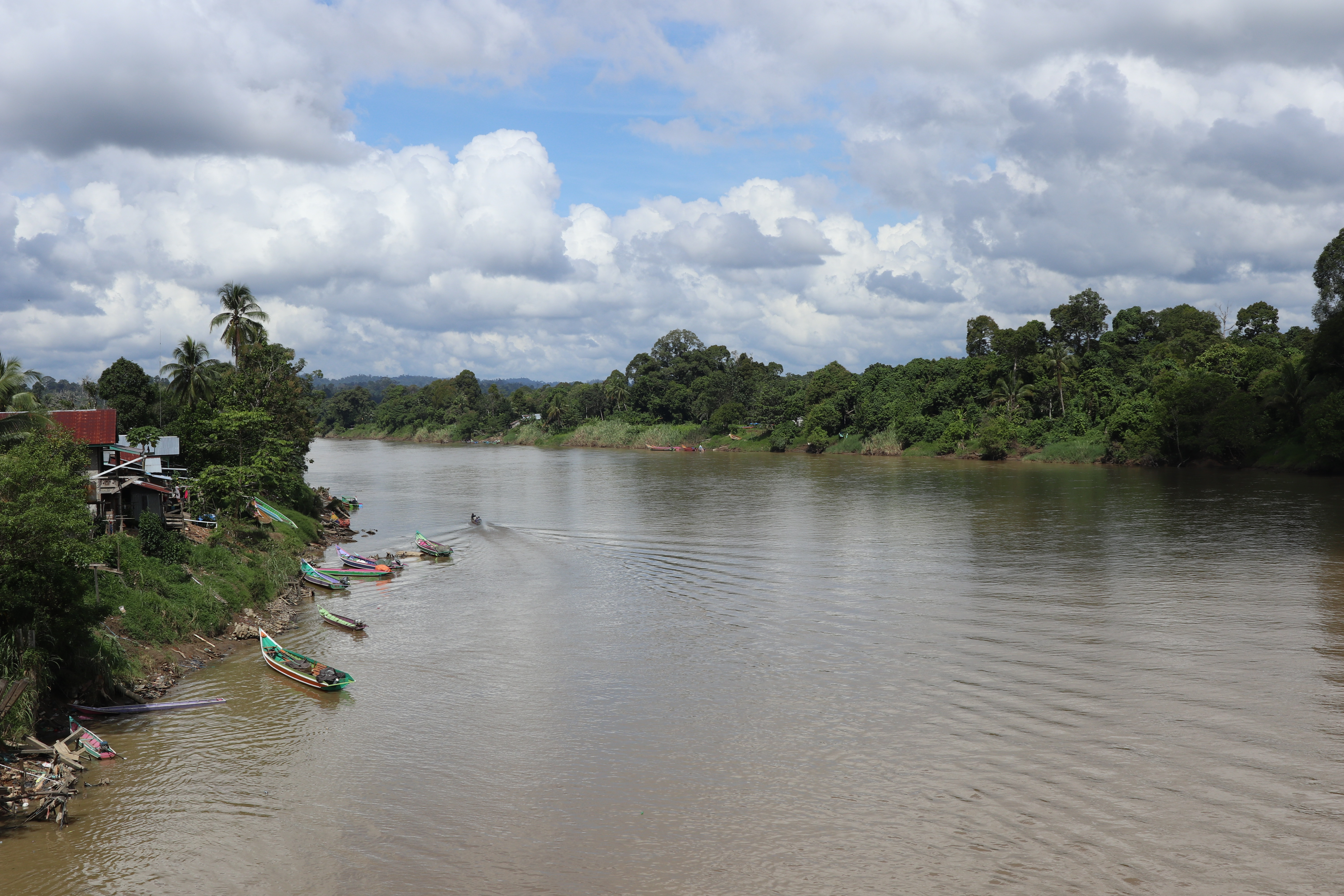
Sembakung River, Nunukan Regency, North Kalimantan.

The Sembakung River is a river in Borneo that flows from Sabah, Malaysia to North Kalimantan, Indonesia, about 1600 km northeast of the capital Jakarta.

== Geography ==
The 322 kilometers long river flows in the northeastern area of Borneo island with predominantly tropical rainforest climate (designated as Af in the Köppen-Geiger climate classification). The annual average temperature in the area is 24 °C. The warmest month is August, when the average temperature is around 26 °C, and the coldest is January, at 22 °C. The average annual rainfall is 4020 mm. The wettest month is December, with an average of 393 mm rainfall, and the driest is June, with 251 mm rainfall.

== See also ==
- List of drainage basins of Indonesia
- List of rivers of Indonesia
- List of rivers of Kalimantan
