= Sesayap River =

Coordinates: 3.61666°N 117.2293°E

Sesayap River Sungai Sesayap, Sungai Sesajap, Sesajap-rivier
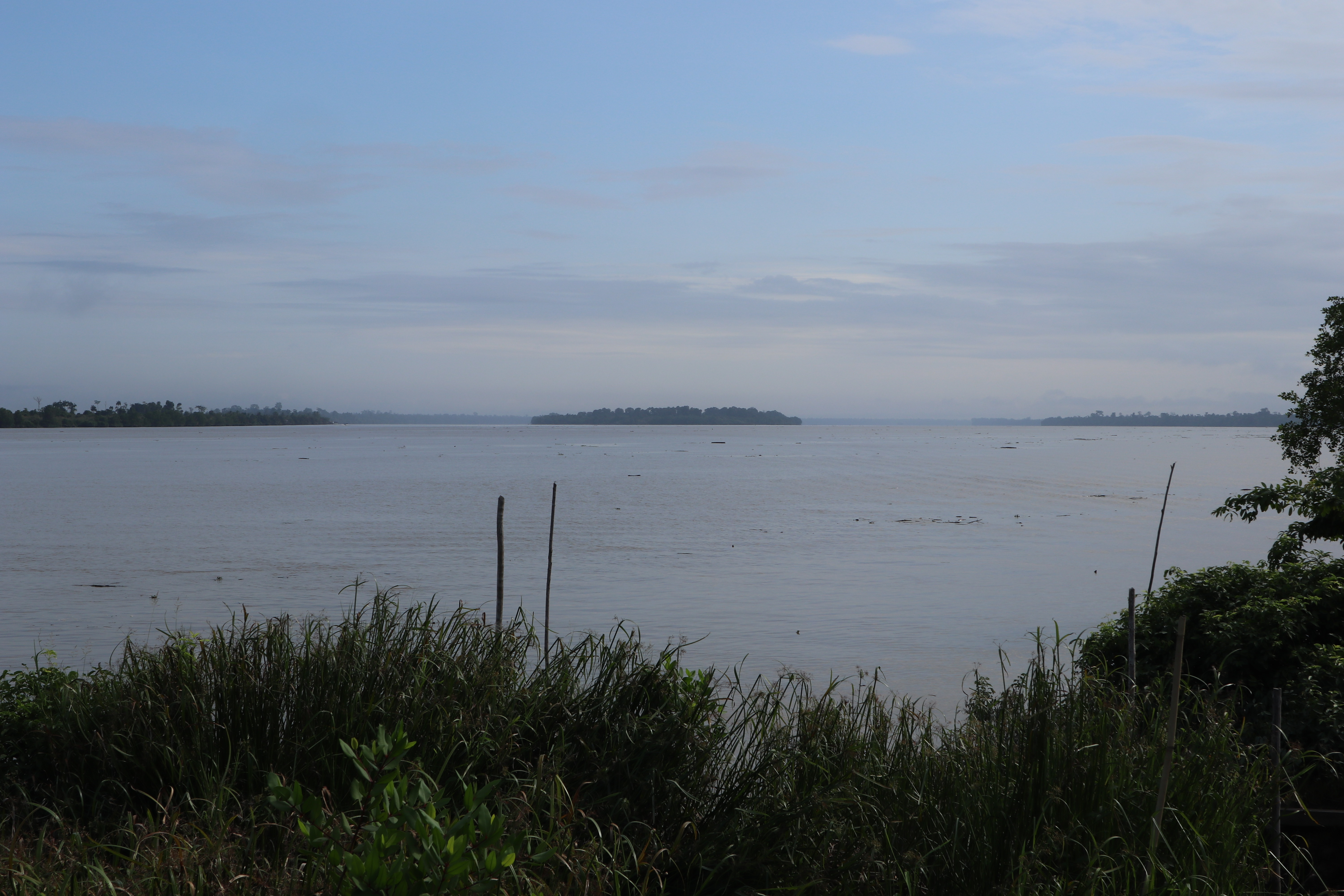

- River mouth location Sesayap River (Indonesia)

Location
- Country: Indonesia

Physical characteristics
- Source
  - location: North Kalimantan
- Length: 279 km (173 mi)
- Basin size: 16,449.12 km^{2} (6,351.04 mi^{2})
- Discharge
  - location: Sesayap Delta, Sulawesi Sea
  - average: 1,275.39 m^{3}/s (45,040 cu ft/s)

Basin features
- River system: Sesayap basin

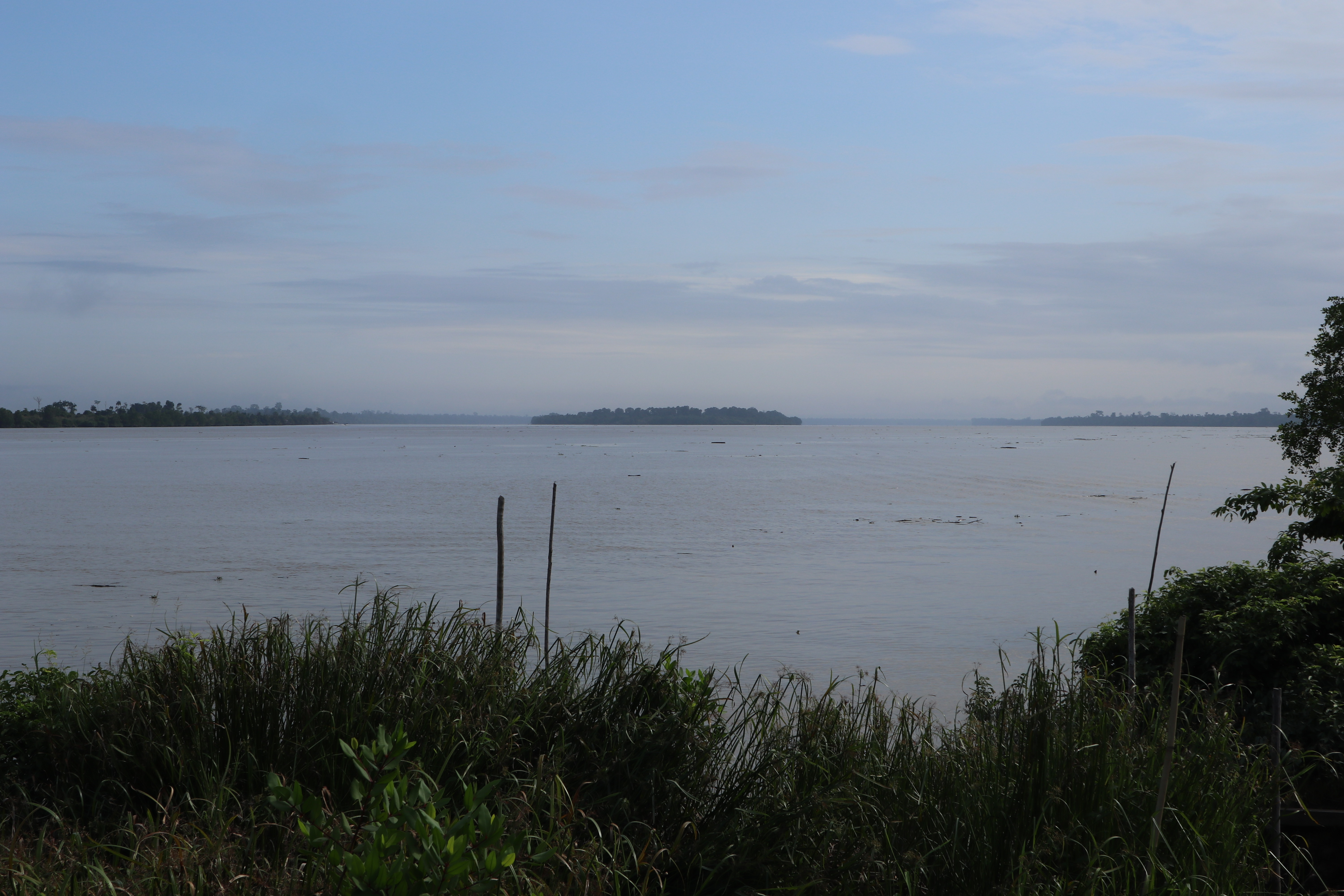

Sesayap River is a river in Borneo island, flowing in North Kalimantan Province, Indonesia. It forms a delta which has islands including Bunyu and Tarakan Island.

== Geography ==
The river flows in the northeastern area of Borneo island with predominantly tropical rainforest climate (designated as Af in the Köppen-Geiger climate classification). The annual average temperature in the area is 22 °C. The warmest month is April, when the average temperature is around 23 °C, and the coldest is December, at 22 °C. The average annual rainfall is 4020 mm. The wettest month is October, with an average of 438 mm rainfall, and the driest is June, with 263 mm rainfall.

== See also ==
- List of drainage basins of Indonesia
- List of rivers of Indonesia
- List of rivers of Kalimantan
