= Negara River =

River in Kalimantan (Indonesian Borneo)

Negara River Sungai Negara, Sungai Bahan
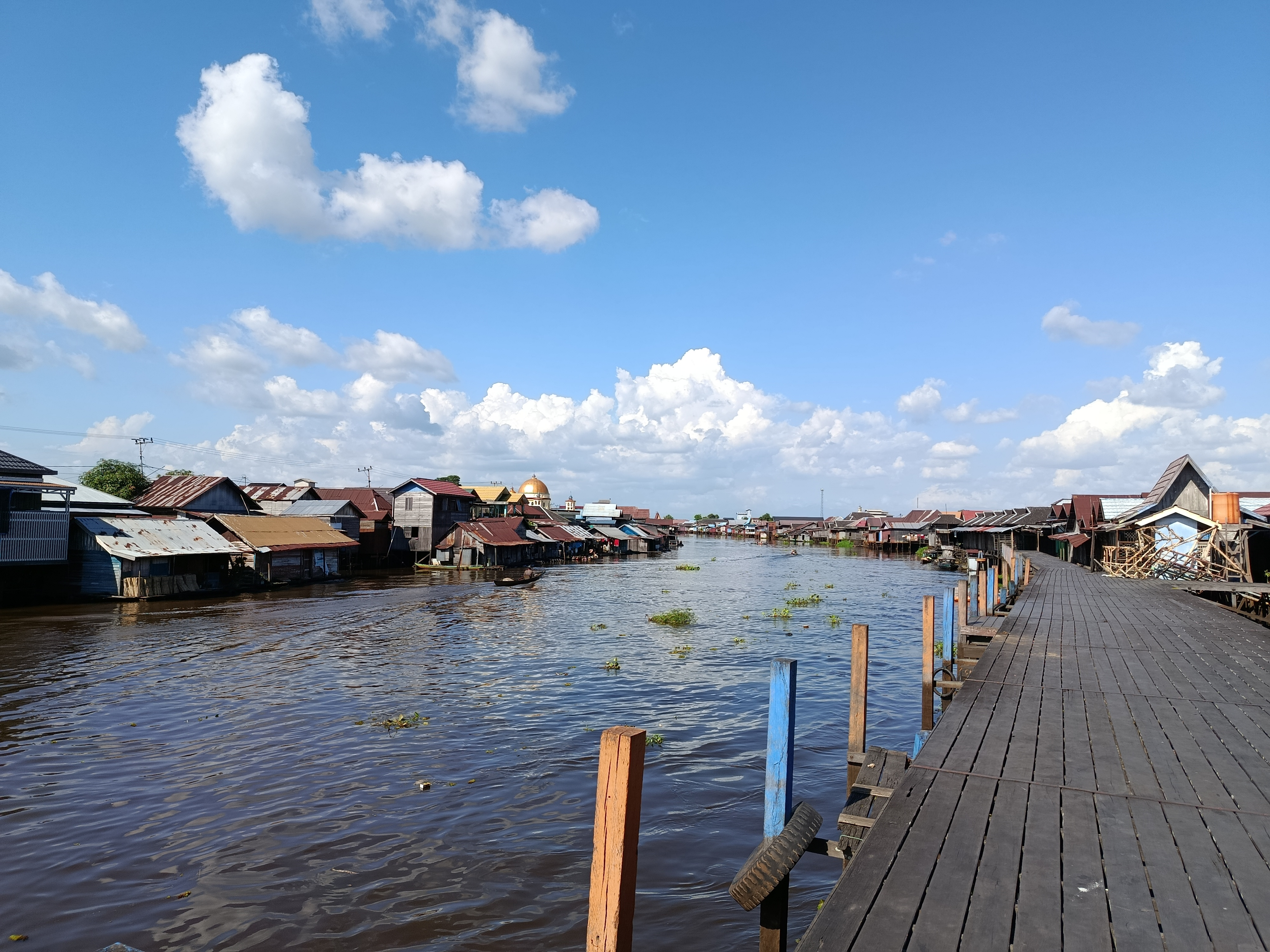

- Mouth location in Kalimantan (Borneo)
- Etymology: taken from the name of Negara District (formerly the center of Negara Daha Kingdom)

Location
- Country: Indonesia

Physical characteristics
- Source: confluence of Tabalong River and Balangan River
  - location: Tabalong, South Kalimantan, Borneo
- Mouth: Barito River
  - location: Marabahan, Barito Kuala
  - coordinates: 2.9867°S 114.7674°E
- Basin size: 250,000 hectares (620,000 acres)

Basin features
- Tributaries
  - right: Amandit River; Batang Alai River

The Negara River (Indonesian: Sungai Negara or Sungai Bahan) is a river of Borneo, Indonesia. It flows in the southeast region of the island, within the Negara District, province of South Kalimantan. It is the second longest river in the province after the Barito River, which the Negara River flows into.

== Hydrology ==
This river is a tributary of the Barito River. It rises in the Meratus Mountains, Tabalong Regency. The river mouth is located on the border of Tapin Regency and Barito Kuala Regency, where the small city of Marabahan (historic name: Bandar Muara Bahan) is located.

The Negara River has become the source of life for the people of South Kalimantan, especially in the northern region, both for the source of water and for transportation. Locations of interest along the Negara River include Margasari in Tapin Regency and Negara District in Hulu Sungai Selatan Regency.

== Etymology ==
The river's name is taken from the Negara District (formerly the center of Negara Daha Kingdom). During the Negara Daha (pre-Islamic) period, the river was called Sungai Bahan (Bahan River). The watershed of Negara is called Batang Banyu area.

== Geography ==
The river flows in the southeast area of Borneo island with a predominantly tropical rainforest climate (designated as Af in the Köppen-Geiger climate classification). The annual average temperature in the area is 24 °C (75 °F). The warmest month is September, when the average temperature is around 26 °C (79 °F), and the coldest is November, at 23 °C (73 °F). The average annual rainfall is 2,767 millimeters (108.9 inches). The wettest month is February, with an average of 366-millimeter (14.4 in) rainfall, and the driest is September, with a 75-millimeter (3.0 in) rainfall.

== Landscape ==
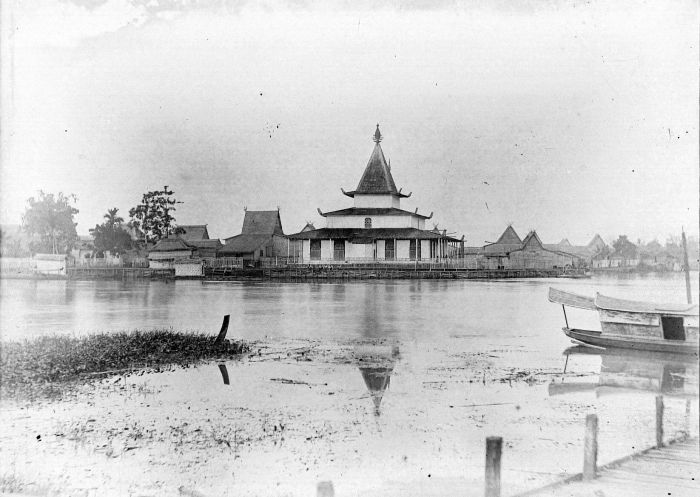
A village on the bank of the Negara River, c. 1880–1920

This area can be reached using the road connecting Banjarmasin and Balikpapan, through Kandangan and Amuntai. With an area of around 250,000 hectares, this valley is one of the most fertile in Borneo (Kalimantan), resulting in a higher population than in other parts of Kalimantan. "Rawa Negara" ("Negara Swamp") is located between the Barito River and Meratus Mountains, with open surface and deep water, stretching to the lakes area (Lake Bangkau, Lake Panggang, and Lake Sembujur) forming a plain with seasonal flood and protecting the downstream area from flood or salt-water intrusion. The local people are mostly of the Banjar ethnic group, who have an interesting land use system that combines various rice types that grow on the surface (floating), water buffalo, and duck husbandry. The main habitat is the peat swamp forest, riparian forest, Melaleuca/Combretocarpus swamp forest, various open swamps with floating vegetation or grassy swamps, open water bodies, and agricultural land. The people use this area to find wood, cut trees to make furniture, create farmlands, and engage in fishery and bird hunting.

== See also ==
- List of drainage basins of Indonesia
- List of rivers of Indonesia
- List of rivers of Kalimantan
