= Kapuas River (Barito River tributary) =

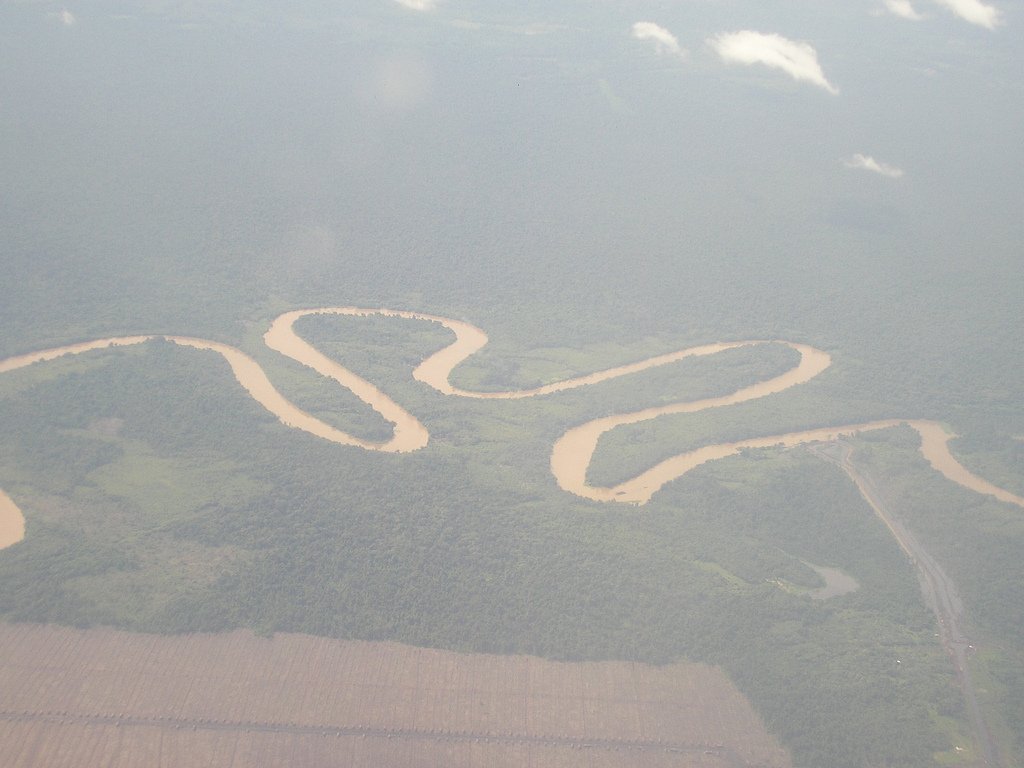

Location
- Country: Indonesia

Physical characteristics
- Source
  - location: Müller Mountain Range
  - elevation: 586 m (1,923 ft)
- Mouth
  - location: Barito River
  - coordinates: 2°58′49.08″S 114°23′10.68″E
  - elevation: 9 m (30 ft)
- Length: 600 km (370 mi)
- Basin size: 16,044 km^{2} (6,195 sq mi)
- Discharge
  - location: Kuala Kapuas (confluence of Barito), Kapuas Regency (Basin size: 15,836 km^{2} (6,114 sq mi)
  - average: 1,770 m^{3}/s (63,000 cu ft/s)

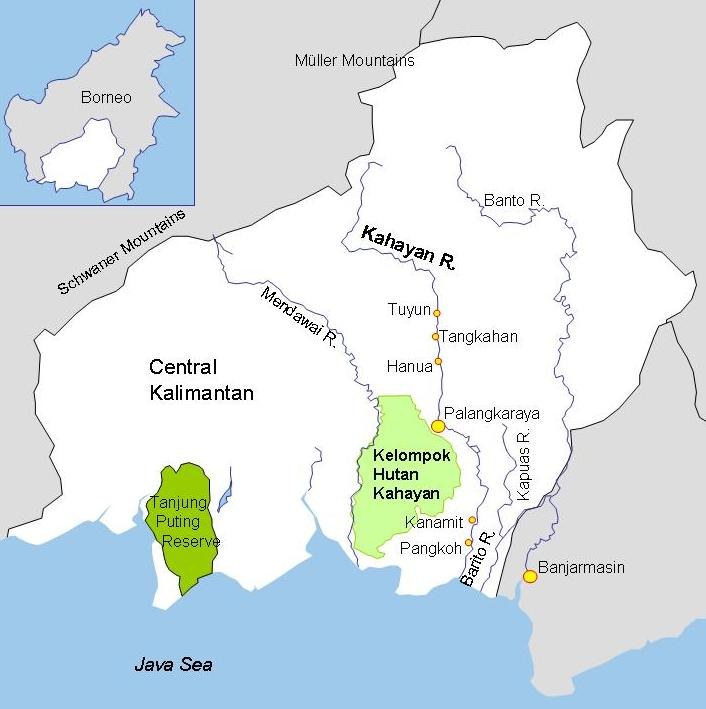
Kapuas and other rivers in Central and South Kalimantan

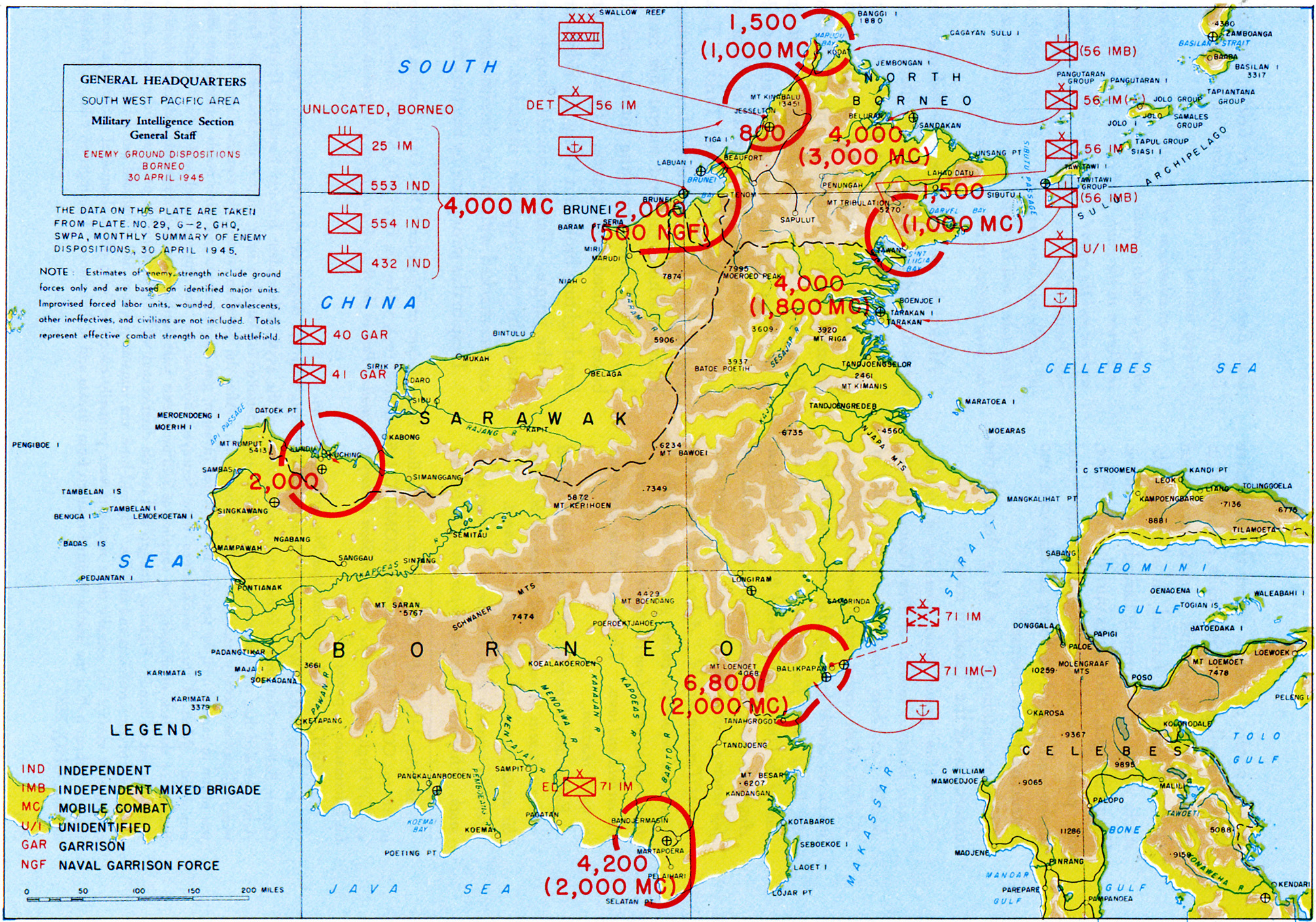
A 1945 map showing the two Kapuas rivers of Borneo (Kapueas on the map)

The Kapuas River (or Kapueas) is a river in the Indonesian part of Borneo island. It originates in the Müller Mountain Range at the center of the island and flows south until merging with the Barito River and discharging into the Java Sea. It should be distinguished from another Kapuas River, which starts on the other side of the same mountain range in central Borneo but flows to the west and empties to the South China Sea.

The river is about 600 km (370 mi) long and up to 6 m (20 ft) deep. It flows through a marshy region rich in tropical forests, nearly parallel to the Barito River, and merges with the latter about 60 km from the Java Sea coast, within the town of Kualakapuas (lit. mouth of Kapuas in Indonesian). Between 1880 and 1890, a 30 km long canal was dug by the Dutch colonizers between the Kapuas and Barito rivers for agricultural purposes. The Kapuas River is narrow (about 50 m) and very winding in its upper stream. It straightens and widens up to 450 m in its lower reaches. There, it contains several elongated islands (shorter than 2 km). Its discharge rate varies through the year reaching the maximum in the peak of rainy seasons in April and November. The river is navigable up to 420 km from the mouth. Significant deposits of coal and gold were discovered upstream. Because of the lack of infrastructure, the gold is mined mostly by primitive methods, with only one commercial mine on the river, and the coal is not explored yet. Several bridges cross the Kapuas River. One of them, located near the village Lungku Layang, Timpah (Indonesian: Kecamatan Timpah), Kapuas Regency, Central Kalimantan, collapsed on 3 April 2009 killing one and injuring 6 people working under the bridge.

== Barito Bridge ==
The Barito Bridge is the third longest suspended span in Indonesia a length of 230 meters after Kutai Kartanegara Bridge (270 meters) and Mamberamo Bridge (235 meters). The Kutai Kartanegara Bridge collapsed in November 2011.

== See also ==
- List of drainage basins of Indonesia
