= Müller Mountains =

Mountain range in Kalimantan, Borneo

Coordinates: 0°40′N 113°50′E

The Müller Mountains (Indonesian: Pegunungan Muller) are a mountain range in Central Borneo. The mountains extend along the northern border of Kalimantan, the Indonesia-administered parts of Borneo. The mountains are the source of the Kapuas River. The range is named after Georg Müller, a German engineer who traversed the mountains in the 1820s.

== See also ==
- List of mountain ranges
