= Melawi Regency =

Regency in West Kalimantan, Indonesia

Melawi Regency Kabupaten Melawi
- Regency
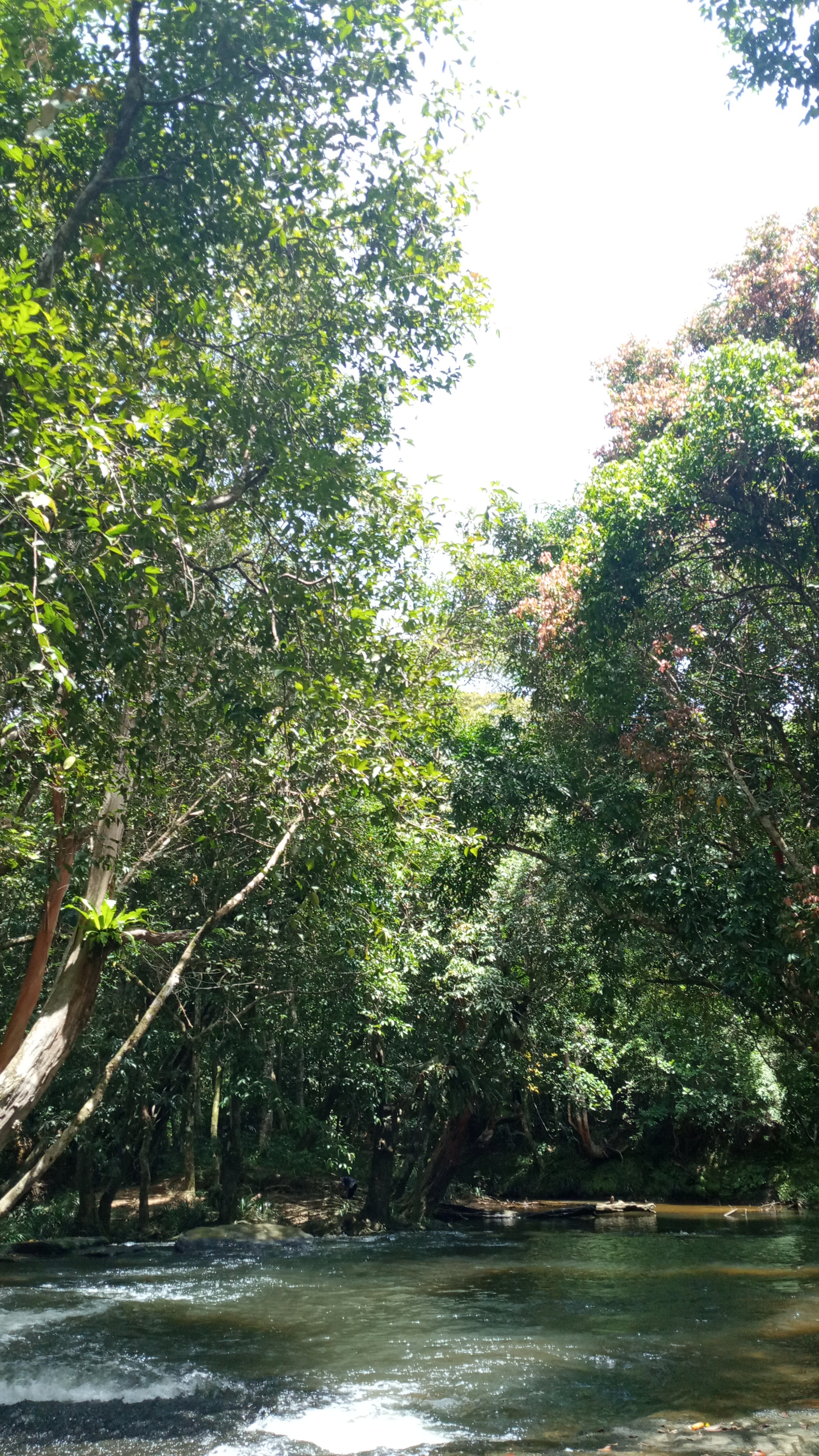
- A river in Melawi

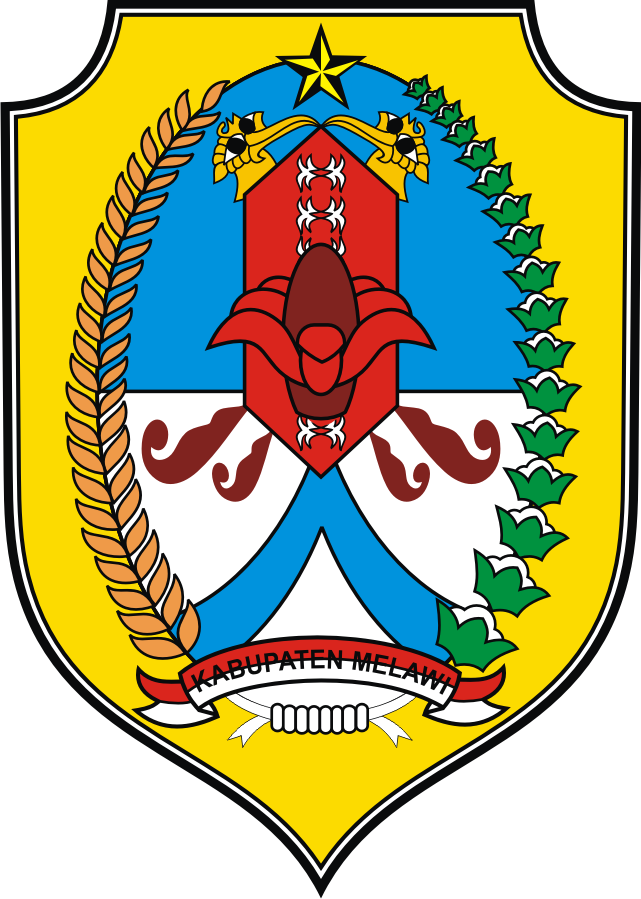
- Coat of arms

- Location within West Kalimantan

- Location in Kalimantan and Indonesia Melawi Regency (Indonesia)
- Coordinates: 0.3361°S 111.6981°E
- Country: Indonesia
- Province: West Kalimantan
- Capital: Nanga Pinoh

Government
  - Regent: Dadi Sunarya Usfa Yursa
  - Vice Regent: Malin

Area
  - Total: 10,640.8 km^{2} (4,108.4 sq mi)

Population (mid 2025 estimate)
  - Total: 220,511
  - Density: 20.7232/km^{2} (53.6727/sq mi)
- Time zone: UTC+7 (IWST)
- Area code: (+62) 561
- Website: melawikab.go.id

Melawi Regency is a regency of West Kalimantan province of Indonesia. It was created on 18 December 2003 from what was previously part of Sintang Regency. It covers an area of 10,640.8 km^{2}, and had a population of 178,645 at the 2010 Census and 234,541 at the 2020 Census; the official estimate as at mid 2025 was 220,511 (comprising 113,811 males and 106,700 females); however this would represent a significant drop since the 2020 Census that is not evidenced elsewhere, and in fact the same document elsewhere states that "the population of Melawi Regency in 2025 is 246,920 people, with the distribution of the population still concentrated in Nanga Pinoh District, which is 24.67% or 60,927 people". The principal town lies at Nanga Pinoh.

== Administrative districts ==
When Melawi Regency was established, it originally composed into seven administrative districts (kecamatan). In 2007, four new districts were created (Tanah Pinoh Barat was split off from the western part of Tanah Pinoh, Pinoh Utara and Pinoh Selatan were split off from the northern and southern parts of Nanga Pinoh, respectively, and Belimbing Hulu was split off from the southern part of Belimbing).

Melawi Regency consists of eleven districts (kecamatan), tabulated below with their areas and their populations at the 2010 Census and the 2020 Census, together with the official estimates as at mid 2025. The table also includes the locations of the district administrative centres, the number of administrative villages (all classed as rural desa) in each district, and its post code.

Kode Wilayah	Name of District (kecamatan)	Area in km^{2}	Pop'n Census 2010	Pop'n Census 2020	Pop'n Estimate mid 2025	Admin centre	No. of villages	Post code
61.10.07	Sokan	1,577.2	14,773	18,710	16,852	Nanga Sokan	18	79675
61.10.06	Tanah Pinoh	739.3	14,178	18,657	17,812	Kota Baru	12	79674
61.10.11	Tanah Pinoh Barat (West Tanah Pinoh)	829.0	11,433	14,867	13,510	Ulak Muid	10	79676
61.10.05	Sayan	1,166.3	15,639	19,311	18,537	Nanga Sayan	18	79673
61.10.01	Belimbing	1,238.0	20,191	24,386	25,088	Pemuar	17	79671
61.10.10	Belimbing Hulu (Upper Belimbing)	454.0	8,687	10,818	10,843	Tiong Keranjik	8	79670
61.10.02	Nanga Pinoh	617.2	39,604	54,424	53,301	Nanga Pinoh	17	79672
61.10.09	Pinoh Selatan (South Pinoh)	931.0	9,974	12,028	11,604	Manggala	12	79677
61.10.08	Pinoh Utara (North Pinoh)	890.0	11,501	15,230	14,489	Tekelak	19	79678
61.10.03	Ella Hilir (Lower Ella)	1,136.7	15,280	18,848	18,888	Nanga Ella Hilir	19	79681
61.10.04	Menukung	1,062.1	17,385	20,991	19,587	Menukung Kota	19	79682
	Totals	10,640.8	178,645	234,541	220,511	Nanga Pinoh	169	
