= Kapuas River =

River in West Kalimantan, Indonesia

Kapuas
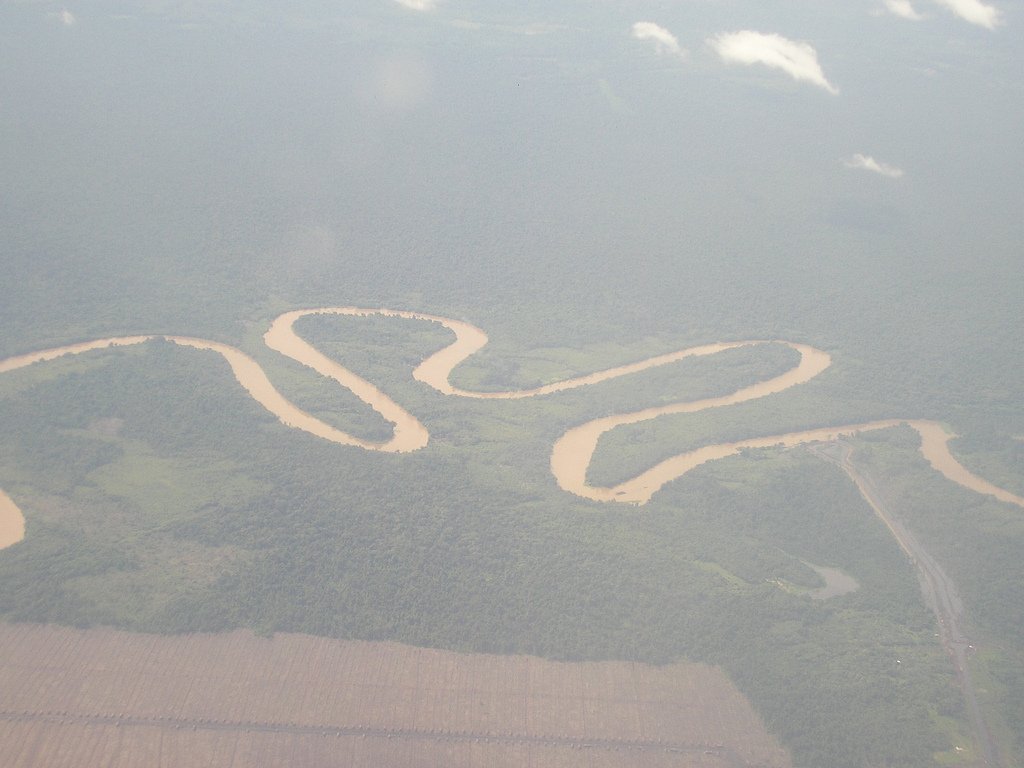
- Aerial view of Kapuas river

Location
- Country: Indonesia

Physical characteristics
- Source
  - location: Mount Raya at Müller Mountain Range
  - elevation: 2,278 m (7,474 ft)
- Mouth
  - location: South China Sea
  - coordinates: 0°4′0″S 109°10′59″E
  - elevation: 0 m (0 ft)
- Length: 1,143 km (710 mi)
- Basin size: 98,749.1 km^{2} (38,127.2 mi^{2})
- Depth
  - maximum: 40 m (130 ft) to 50 m (160 ft)
- Discharge
  - location: Kapuas Delta
  - average: (Period: 2003–2016)6,012 m^{3}/s (212,300 cu ft/s)

Basin features
- Progression: South China Sea
- River system: Kapuas River
- Tributaries
  - left: Bungan, Keriau, Manday, Bunut, Embau, Silat, Melawi, Tempunak, Sepauk, Sekadau
  - right: Mandalam, Sibau, Awin, Palin, Embaloh, Tawang, Ketungau, Belitang, Sekayam, Tayan, Landak

Kapuas River in Kalimantan

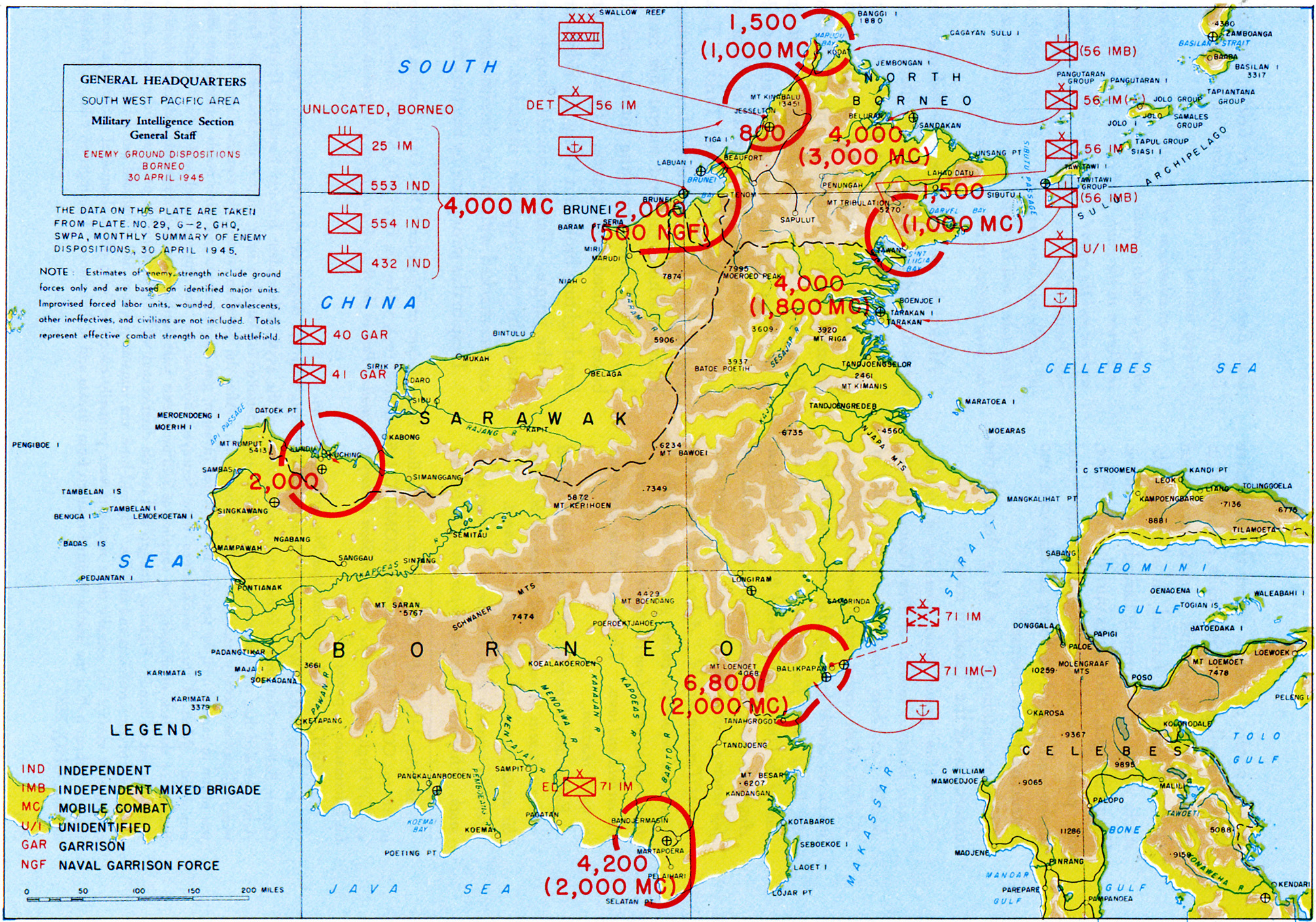
A 1945 map showing the two Kapuas rivers of Borneo (Kapoeas on the map)

The Kapuas River (Old Indonesian/Dutch spelling: Kapoeas River) is a river in the Indonesian part of Borneo island, at the geographic center of Maritime Southeast Asia. At 1,143 km (710 mi) in length, it is the longest river on the island of Borneo, the longest river in Indonesia and one of the world's longest island rivers. It originates in the Müller mountain range at the center of the island and flows west into the South China Sea creating an extended marshy delta. The delta is located west-southwest of Pontianak, the capital of the West Kalimantan province, althouth the most northern of the river's outflows actually goes through the city itself. This Kapuas River should be distinguished from another Kapuas, which starts on the other side of the same mountain range in central Borneo but flows to the south, merging with the Barito and discharging into the Java Sea.

== Geography and hydrology ==
The river is 1,143 km (710 mi) long and 99,000 km^{2} (38,000 mi^{2}) the river basin covers more than 67% of West Kalimantan. The river originates near the center of Borneo, south of the Indonesian-Malaysian border, in the joint between the western slope of the Müller Mountain Range, which runs through the island center, and the southern slope of the Upper Kapuas Range (Indonesian: Kapuas Hulu), which is located more to the west. For about 165 km (103 mi) it flows through a mountainous terrain and then descends to a marshy plain. There, the elevation decreases by only 50 m (0.031 mi) over 902 km (560 mi) from Putussibau to the river delta.

=== Kapuas Lakes ===
About 350 km (220 mi) from the source, near the northern shore of the river, lies a system of Kapuas Lakes which are connected to the river by numerous channels. These lakes are Bekuan (area 1,268 hectares), Belida (600 ha), Genali (2,000 ha), Keleka Tangai (756 ha), Luar (5,208 ha), Pengembung (1,548 ha), Sambor (673 ha), Sekawi (672 ha), Sentarum (2,324 ha), Sependan (604 ha), Seriang (1,412) Sumbai (800 ha), Sumpa (664) and Tekenang (1,564 ha). When the monthly precipitation exceeds about 300 mm (12 in), the river overflows its banks, diverting much of its waters to the lakes at a rate of up to 1,000 m^{3}/s (35,000 cu ft/s), and forming a single volume of water with them. This outflow prevents massive flooding of the lower reaches of the river; it also promotes fish migration from the river to the lakes for spawning but drives birds away from the lakes.

=== Delta ===
The river discharges into the South China Sea creating a marshy delta, which spreads both inland and into the sea, with the silt deposits extending up to 50–60 km (31–37 mi) from the Borneo coast. The delta is located west-southwest of Pontianak, the capital of West Kalimantan province, which lies at the equator. The delta has five arms, of which the northernmost is the widest, and is therefore called the Big Kapuas (Indonesian: Kapuas Besar).

=== Discharge ===
The average annual rainfall in the catchment area is 3,666 mm. The average runoff is around 2,339 mm. The discharge rate varies through the year, averaging around 5,600–7,800 m^{3}/s (200,000–280,000 cu ft/s) at the delta and 2,000 m^{3}/s (71,000 cu ft/s) upstream, at the confluence of the Tawang. The discharge peaks during the rainy seasons in April and November, during which the water level may rise by 10–12 m (33–39 ft) overnight, overflowing river banks and flooding the nearby areas.

Year, period	Min (m^{3}/s)	Mean (m^{3}/s)	Max (m^{3}/s)	Ref.
Kapuas Delta 0°3′14.0328″N 109°11′28.2948″E 0°36′51.534″S 109°22′41.2068″E
2016–2020		7,803		
2003–2016		6,012		
1971–2000		6,260.1		
	3,000	6,500	9,000	
	2,000	5,500	8,900	
		5,600		
		6,214		
Sanggau 0°7′2.5464″N 110°35′54.4704″E
2013–2015	1,117	5,220	9,394	
2000–2015		5,900		
1971–2000		5,069.3		
Putussibau 0°51′22.6764″N 112°55′26.292″E
1971–2000		886.3		

== Tributaries ==
The largest tributary is the Melawi, which occurs to the left near Sintang, about 465 km from the mouth. Other major tributaries are the Landak, Sekayam, Ketungau, Tawang, Bunut and Embaloh rivers.

The main tributaries from the mouth:

Left tributary	Right tributary	Length (km)	Basin size (km^{2})	Average discharge^{*} (m^{3}/s)
Kapuas		1,143	98,749.1	6,260.1
	Landak	178	8,461.5	471.9
	Sê Lamboe		380.2	20.1
	Tayan		2,089.2	107.5
Emboewan			455.1	24.1
	Sekayam	221	5,162.6	305.3
	Kedukul		368.1	17.1
Sekadau		117	2,672.2	136.8
	Aja		395.2	18.2
Sepauk			1,137.9	53.5
	Belitang		2,584	128.8
Tempunak			1,092.4	50.2
Melawi		471	22,585.8	1,243.4
	Ketungau	186	5,496.2	320.8
Silat			1,374	78.5
Seberuang			481	28
	Kenapai		292.8	17.3
	Tawang		3,826	264.8
Suhaid			340	23.6
Embau			769.3	51.1
Boyan			330.6	24.6
Bunut			3,403.3	267.5
	Embaloh	95	3,469.8	289.5
	Palin		1,155.5	99.8
	Awin		509.3	44.4
Manday			2,896.2	251.6
	Sibau	90	1,687.7	150.3
	Mandalam	30	1,771.9	157.1
Keriau			1,635.8	138.4
	Goeng		275.1	24.3
Lapung			199.4	17.4
Bungan		50	1,019.7	87.7
Tanjan			327.7	28.7
Tahoem			302.8	26.3

^{*}Period: 1971–2000

== Climate ==
The climate is warm and very humid, with the average annual precipitation ranging from year to year between 2,863 and 5,517 mm (Köppen Climate-classification Af), and the number of rainy days between 120 and 309; the largest precipitation was observed in 1976 (120 rainy days) and the wettest in 1988, with only 184 rainy days. The temperature is rather stable with a typical minimum of 24 °C (75 °F) and a maximum of 32 °C (90 °F) throughout the whole year.

== Flora and fauna ==
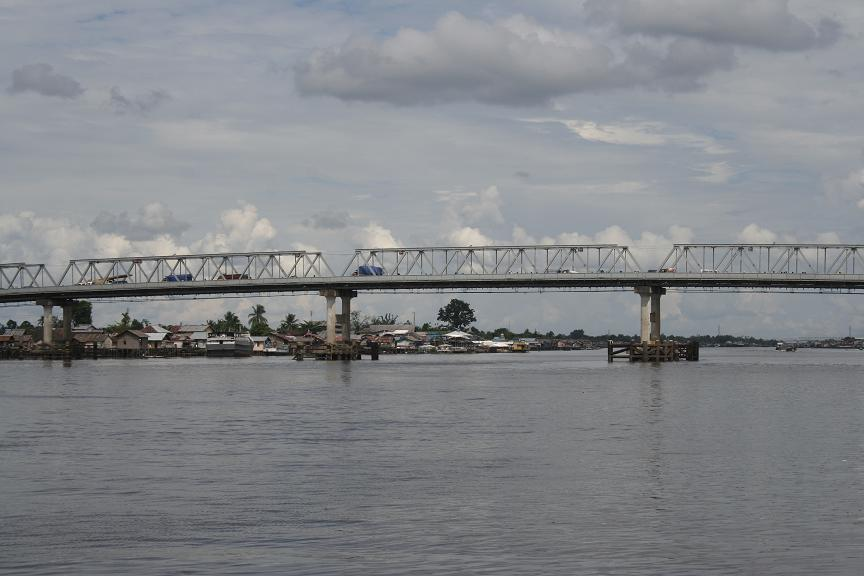
A bridge on the outskirts of Pontianak

In the upper and middle reaches, the river flows through dense tropical forests; the rich flora and fauna are the subject of international research. Discoveries of new species are frequent, such as the Kapuas mud snake (Enhydris gyii), which was discovered in 2003–2005 by German and American herpetologists. This species is remarkable because it can spontaneously change its skin color, similar to the chameleon.

Otters and crocodiles are common in the Kapuas River, but frogs are nearly absent. Agile gibbons (Hylobates agilis), Müller's Bornean gibbons (Hylobates muelleri), Prevost's squirrels (Callosciurus prevostii), and treeshrews inhabit the trees above the river.

There are two national parks on the river banks, Betung Kerihun with an area of 8,000 km^{2}, and Danau Sentarum (an area of 1,320 km^{2}), the latter includes the Kapuas Lakes.

=== Fish ===
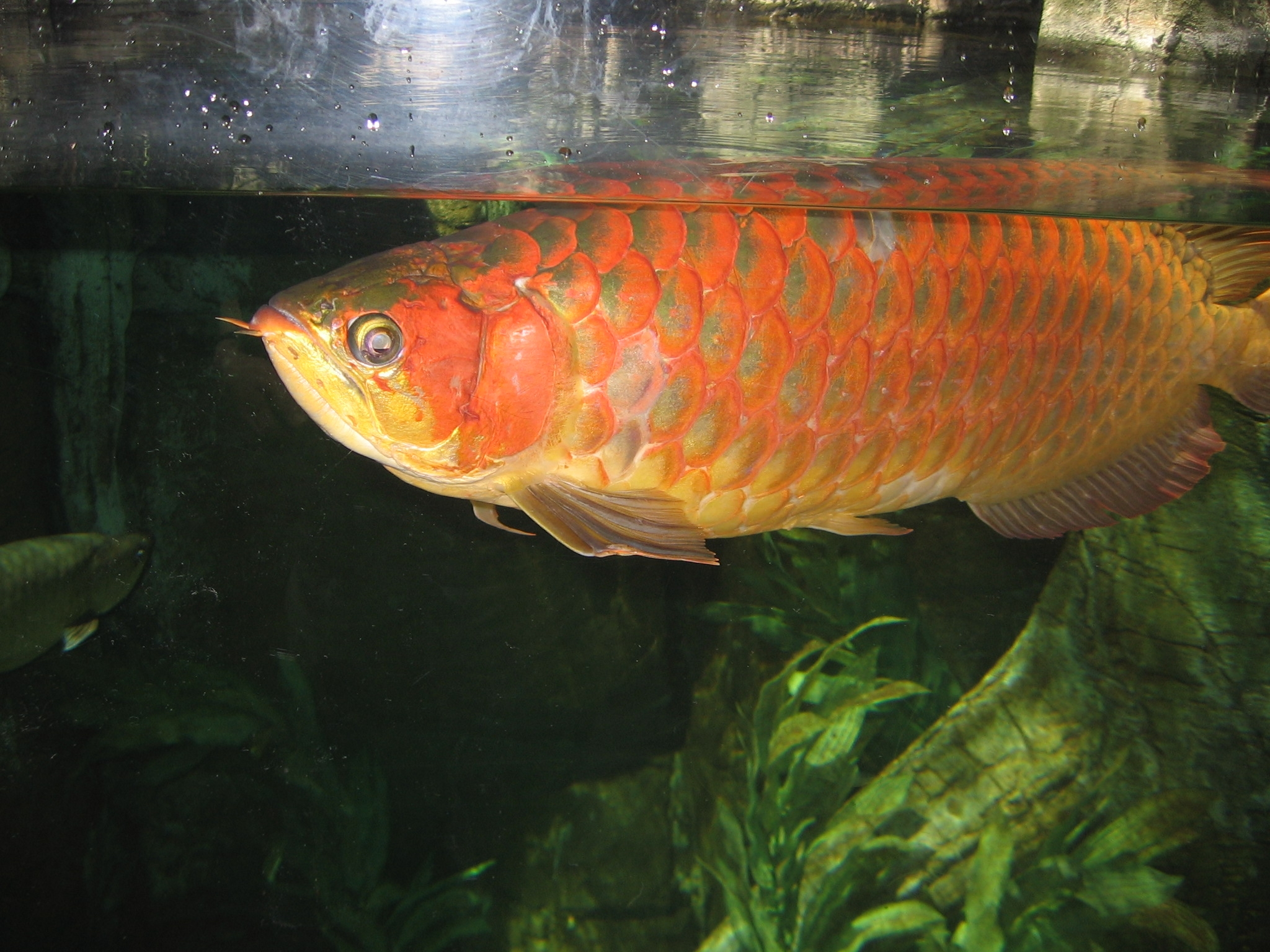
The super red arowana, either considered a variant of the Asian arowana or its own species, is only found in Kapuas

About 300 fish species have been identified in the river basin, of which 234 are of high economic value. There are more fish species than any other river basin in Indonesia. They belong to 120 genera and 40 families with the two major groups being cyprinids and catfish. More than 30% of the species originate from the sea and inhabit the delta areas. Among the economically important species are food fish such as Pangasius catfish, giant gourami, kissing gourami, snakeheads, and large cyprinids such as Tor mahseers and barbs such as Leptobarbus and Puntioplites, and species for the aquarium trade such as the super red arowana and various rasboras. Because of overfishing and habitat degradation, several species are threatened. Among these endangered species are the arowana and white-edge freshwater whipray, and the wallago catfish, which formerly migrated in large schools up and down the Kapuas River.

Part of the high species diversity in the Kapuas is related to the many different habitats in the river basin. In the headwaters are fast-flowing highland streams, typically dominated by small loaches, and small —often acidic (blackwater)— forest streams and peat swamps with species such as the tiny Sundadanio rasboras, Sphaerichthys gouramis, and macropodusine gouramis. The main river also includes several habitats, ranging from the nearshore to open waters. In the deepest sections, no light exists and in one species, Lepidocephalus spectrum, this has resulted in a complete reduction of both eyes and pigmentation (similar to cavefish).

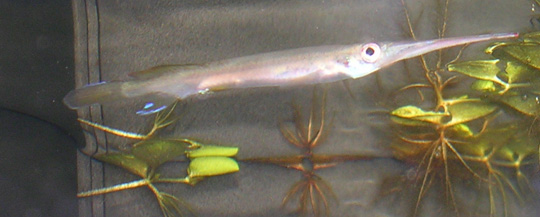
Female Hemirhamphodon pogonognathus, about 4 cm (1.6 in) long

Owing to the warm climate and abundance of food, most fishes breed all through the year with only a few species like fire eel (Mastacembelus erythrotaenia) having certain reproductive periods. The number of individuals per species is relatively low. The large variety of species may be explained by the fact that some 6,000 years ago, the Kapuas River, as a tributary of the Sunda River, was connected to other tributary rivers of South Sumatra, Java, and the Malay Peninsula. Apart from fish, there are numerous crabs, prawns (such as the giant freshwater prawn Macrobrachium rosenbergii), water striders, and other aquatic insects. The rich flora and fauna result in very complex food chains, with fishes consuming foods ranging from fruits to other fish. For example, Hemirhamphodon pogonognathus feeds exclusively on terrestrial insects. Abundant fruits and seeds enter the river after falling from large trees that bend over its waters. The feeding habits of the fish in the Kapuas River are distributed as follows: 54% are omnivores; 36% are carnivorous and eat other fish (14%), insects (5%), and mixed small forest animals (17%). The remaining 10% are herbivorous, with 4% specialising in algae.

== Transport and economic value ==
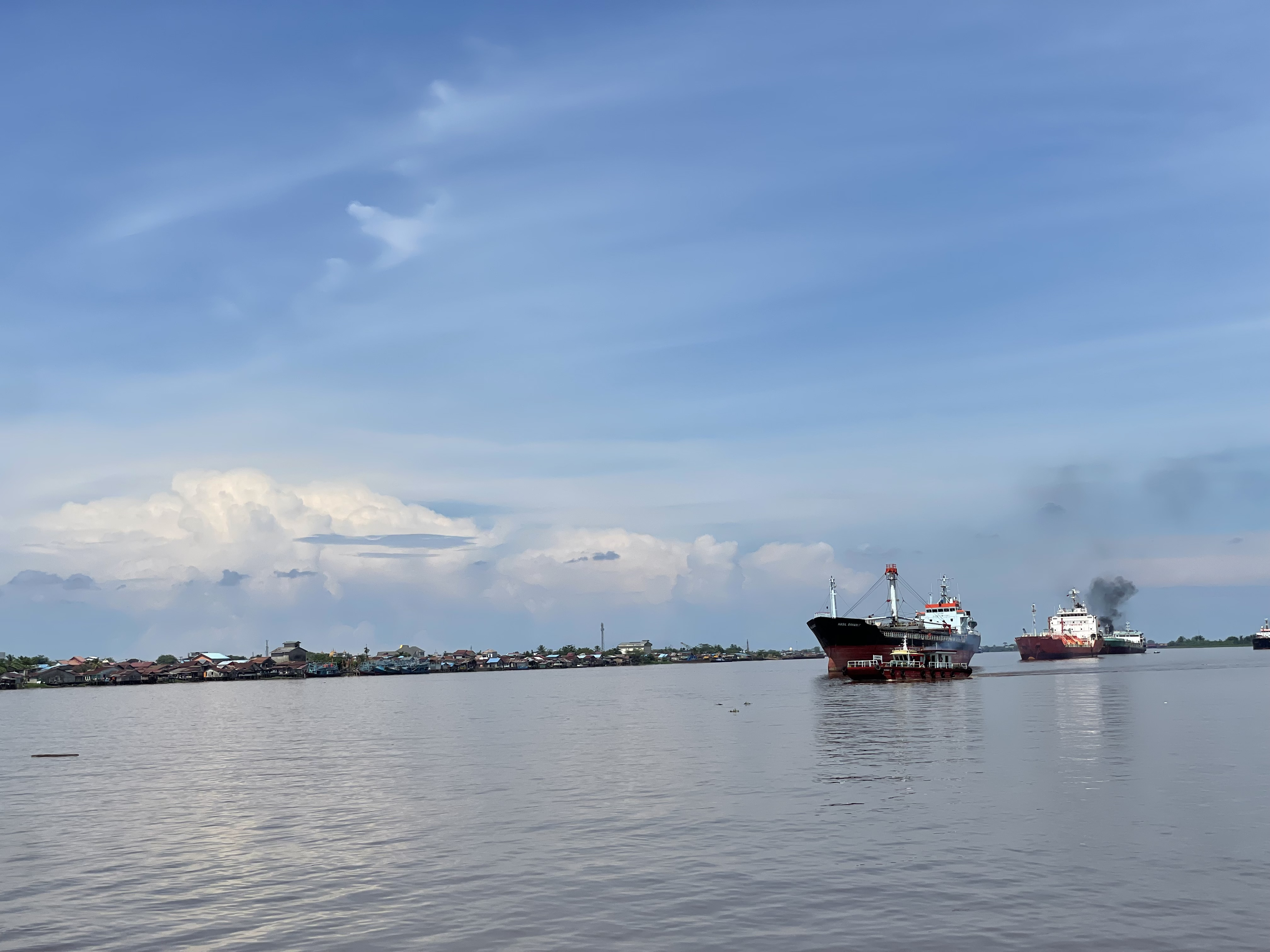
Large ships on Kapuas River

The Kapuas River is the major waterway connecting the center of the island with its western coast. The large river width and depth (up to 27 meters) support intensive cargo and passenger shipping over most of the river length. Ships with a draft of up to 3 meters can navigate up to Sintang, 465 km from the mouth, and those with a draft of up to 2 meters can reach the town of Putussibau (902 km from the mouth). Logging and rafting of timber occur all along the river. Fishing is also common, especially at the Kapuas Lakes and near the river delta. The Tayan Bridge which opened in 2016, crosses over the river and is the longest bridge in Kalimantan. Another major bridge over the area is the Kapuas I Bridge. In 2022, the local government decided to build a newer bridge to accommodate increased traffic in commuters and goods, located to be in parallel with the existing bridge.

== See also ==
- Geography of Indonesia
- List of rivers of Indonesia
- List of drainage basins of Indonesia
- Mae Klong
- Chao Phraya River

== Bibliography ==
- MacKinnon, Kathy (1996) The ecology of Kalimantan, Oxford University Press. ISBN 0-945971-73-7
