= Barataria =

Barataria may refer to:

== Places ==
Trinidad and Tobago

- Barataria, Trinidad and Tobago

United States

- Barataria, Louisiana, a census-designated place (CDP) in Jefferson Parish
- Barataria Bay (sometimes "Barrataria Bay"), Louisiana
- Barataria Preserve, part of Jean Lafitte National Historical Park and Preserve, Louisiana
- Bayou Barataria, which drains into Barataria Bay

== In fiction ==
- Barataria, a fictional ínsula ("isle") awarded by some noblemen to Sancho Panza as a prank in Part II of Cervantes' Don Quixote (from the Spanish word barato, meaning cheap)
- Barataria, a fictional republican kingdom in Gilbert and Sullivan's comic opera The Gondoliers
- Castle Barataria, a castle on Planet X in the CRPG Ultima II: The Revenge of the Enchantress

== Ships ==
- USC&GS Barataria (1867), a survey ship in service with the United States Coast Survey from 1867 to 1878 and with the United States Coast and Geodetic Survey from 1878 to 1885
- USCGC Barataria (WAVP-381), later WHEC-381, a United States Coast Guard cutter in service from 1949 to 1969
- USS Barataria, the name of more than one United States Navy ship
