= Sedimentation enhancing strategy =

Environmental management projects aiming to restore land-building processes in deltas

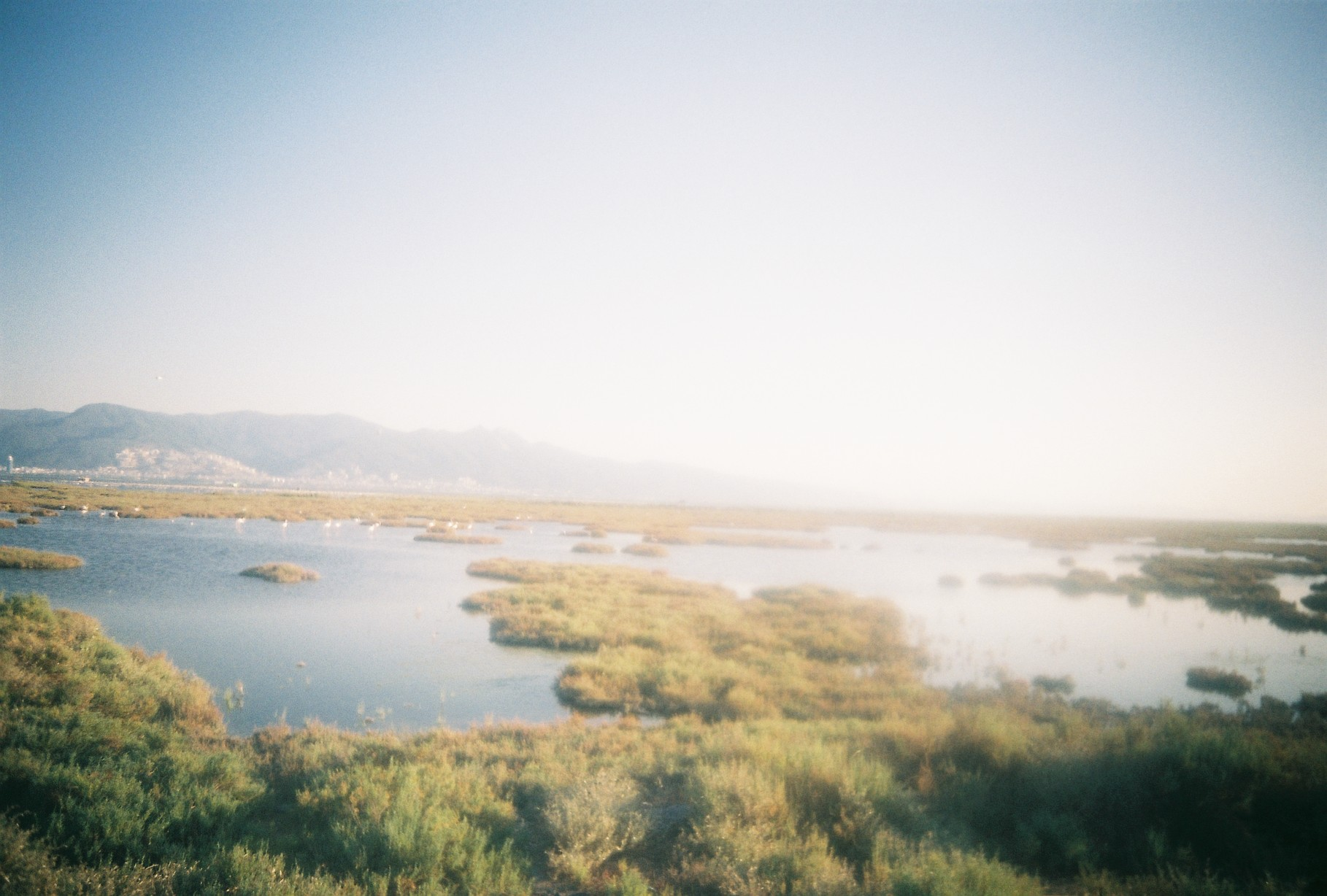
Gediz delta, showing a typical natural delta landscape

Sedimentation enhancing strategies are environmental management projects aiming to restore and facilitate land-building processes in deltas. Sediment availability and deposition are important because deltas naturally subside and therefore need sediment accumulation to maintain their elevation, particularly considering increasing rates of sea-level rise. Sedimentation enhancing strategies aim to increase sedimentation on the delta plain primarily by restoring the exchange of water and sediments between rivers and low-lying delta plains. Sedimentation enhancing strategies can be applied to encourage land elevation gain to offset sea-level rise. Interest in sedimentation enhancing strategies has recently increased due to their ability to raise land elevation, which is important for the long-term sustainability of deltas.

== Benefits of sedimentation enhancing strategies ==
When compared to conventional flood protection infrastructure such as embankments and seawalls, sedimentation enhancing strategies provide various benefits. Firstly, flood protection structures can exacerbate environmental problems in deltas: land reclamation and levee construction result in a loss of water storage area during peak river discharges, which may cause an increased risk of flooding further downstream. Embankments also exacerbate land elevation loss due to soil drainage and hinder natural sediment accumulation. In contrast, sedimentation enhancing strategies do not cause these problems and instead address multiple issues simultaneously: they reduce flood risks while simultaneously restoring ecosystems, enhancing production (e.g. fisheries) and cultural (e.g. landscape) ecosystem services.

Sedimentation enhancing strategies are also more flexible than conventional flood protection. Large-scale infrastructural flood defences are costly and rigid, requiring considerable investment to adapt infrastructural flood defences to changing boundary conditions. Particularly considering uncertain future scenarios due to climate change, sea-level rise and peak river discharges, rigid flood defences may not be the optimal choice. Sedimentation enhancing strategies are more flexible and adaptable to changing environmental conditions, which makes them more likely to perform satisfactorily under different future scenarios.

== Limitations of sedimentation enhancing strategies ==
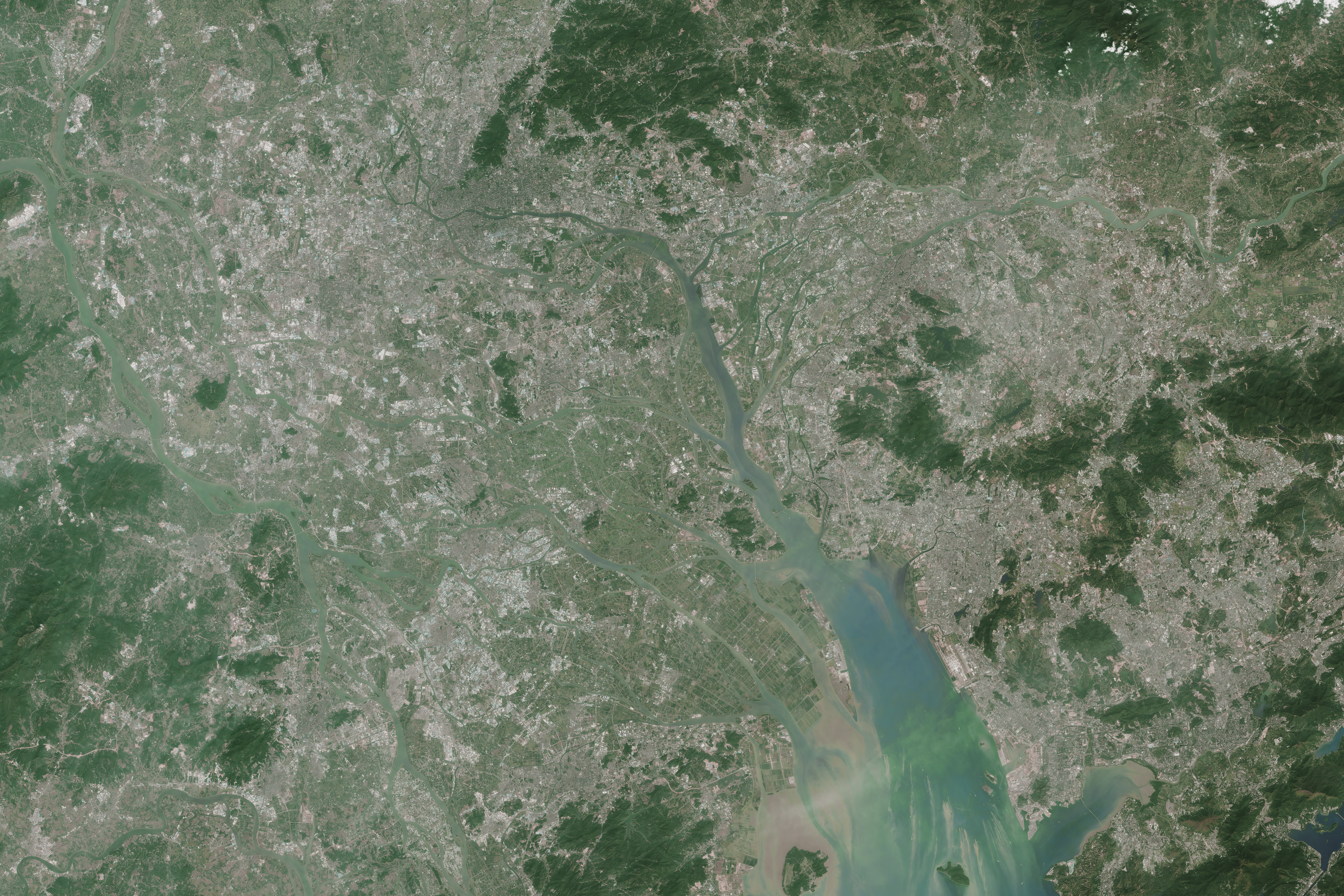
Pearl river delta, one of the largest urban areas in the world, where city infrastructure leaves little room for sedimentation processes

One major obstacle to the implementation of sedimentation enhancing strategies is that they require space which may not be available, as deltas are among the most densely populated regions in the world. Land-use change to make space for sedimentation enhancing strategies requires stakeholder participation, but delta inhabitants may not be willing to change land uses. Additionally, a decline in river sediment delivery due to upstream dam construction and other environmental changes in catchments caused by human activities means that less sediment is available in deltas for sedimentation enhancing strategies. The success of sedimentation enhancing strategies is highly context dependent and depends on, for example, river discharge, sediment concentration in the water, land-use in the delta, the tidal range, stakeholder engagement, and the financial resources of the country in which the delta is located.

== Types of sedimentation enhancing strategies ==
=== River diversions ===
In many deltas worldwide, rivers are disconnected from delta plains by embankments or levees which constrain water bodies and prevent hydrological exchange between water and land. River diversions, designed to correct the issue of disconnection caused by hydrological engineering, are engineered structures along a river that direct water and sediments from the river into adjacent wetlands. Diversion structures can range from simple gates to more complex siphon or pump systems. In addition to requiring the engineered structures at the point of river diversions, this strategy relies on natural land-building processes. River water loses energy and slows down as it passes from the relatively narrow river into the wider receiving area, causing sediments to be deposited, which raises the elevation of the land and may lead to the formation of new land.

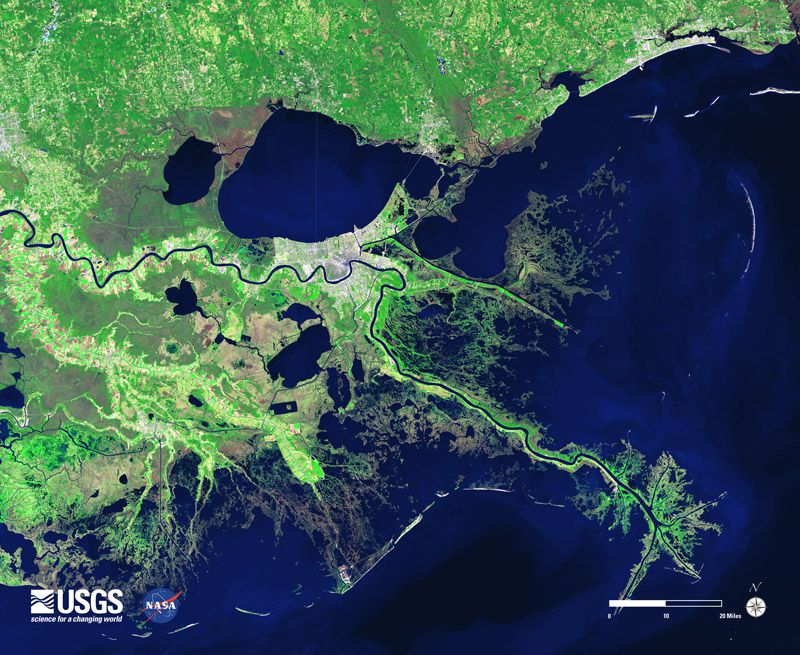
Mississippi delta

==== Mississippi River Delta, Louisiana, USA ====
Over the 20th century the Mississippi Delta lost approximately 25% of its land. Currently, land is disappearing at a rate of almost 11,000 acres per year. To combat these rapid rates of land loss, the Louisiana Coastal Protection and Restoration Authority (CPRA) developed a $50 billion, 50-year plan for the Mississippi Delta, a central component of which is the reintroduction of river water and sediment to the delta plain through river diversions. Engineered river diversions have previously been implemented in the Mississippi Delta at Caernarvon and Davis Pond. Although these diversions were not constructed with the primary goal of building land, land growth occurred at both sites. The 2 km wide Caernarvon diversion resulted in sediment deposition of up to 42 cm in the receiving area, creating a crevasse splay of approximately 130 km^{2} within three months. The currently planned Mid-Barataria, Lower-Barataria and Breton diversions have been specifically designed to capture and divert sediment from the Mississippi river and deposit it in the receiving basins to build land.

==== Canal del Dique, Colombia ====
Canal del Dique is a 400-year-old navigation channel connecting the Rio Magdalena with the Bay of Cartagena in Colombia. The construction of this channel increased the flow of water and sediment into the Bay of Cartagena. Sediment deposition in the canal, connected lakes and swamps, and in the Bay of Cartagena negatively impacted the environment. In 2013, Dutch company Royal HaskoningDHV designed a plan including two control structures on the canal. One control structure was built upstream to regulate the amount of water and sediment flowing from the Rio Magdalena into the Canal del Dique. The second control structure was built downstream of the canal at Puerto Badel to divert water and sediment toward a mangrove area west of the canal. In this way, the mangrove area is restored, land is being built, and at the same time the amount of sediment input in the Bay of Cartagena is reduced which promotes ecological restoration.

=== Tidal flooding of previously enclosed areas ===
Tidal flooding of polders entails (temporarily) breaching dikes and allowing tidal water to flow into an embanked area during high tide. Tidal water can bring in large concentrations of sediment from the sea into the river system, which deposit and accrete within the polder when flow velocities reduce. Tidal flooding of polders is an alternative form of coastal defence that makes use of natural tidal dynamics and associated morphological processes. During the time the polder is flooded, the area can be used for aquaculture. We distinguish between tidal river management, implemented in the Ganges-Brahmaputra-Meghna delta, Bangladesh, and exchange polders, implemented in the Rhine-Meuse delta, the Netherlands.

==== Ganges-Brahmaputra-Meghna delta, Bangladesh ====
Polders, known as beels in Bengal, have been constructed in the Ganges delta since the 1960s. The embankments provide flood protection and initially increased agricultural production. However, together with a decrease in water supply due to upstream dam construction, the embankments caused an increase in riverbed sedimentation and congestion, hampering water drainage and navigation. Another issue in Bangladesh is waterlogging, which negatively impacts the agricultural productivity of the region. Tidal river management (TRM) emerged as a bottom-up, indigenous strategy to reduce waterlogging and solve river congestion problems in Bangladesh. TRM is also seen as a climate change adaptation measure due to its potential to raise land through sedimentation and allow residents to cope with changing environmental conditions. TRM involves temporarily breaching levees around low-lying polders to allow river water to flow in. When the water flows into embanked areas during high tide, water flow velocities reduce and sediments deposit. During low tide, water flow velocity increases again as the water is pulled back through the channels toward the sea, causing deposited riverbed sediment to erode. This increases the drainage capacity and navigability of the channels. TRM has been implemented in five beels in the south of the Ganges-Brahmaputra-Meghna delta. The implementation of TRM by local people (bottom-up) has been particularly successful. For example, land in beel Bhaina was raised by 1.5–2 meters near the cut point in the embankment and by 0.2 meters toward the other end of the beel. Due to the success of TRM, the Bangladesh Water Development Board also formally implemented TRM in multiple beels, which has been less successful due to the top-down implementation causing conflict between locals and formal institutions.

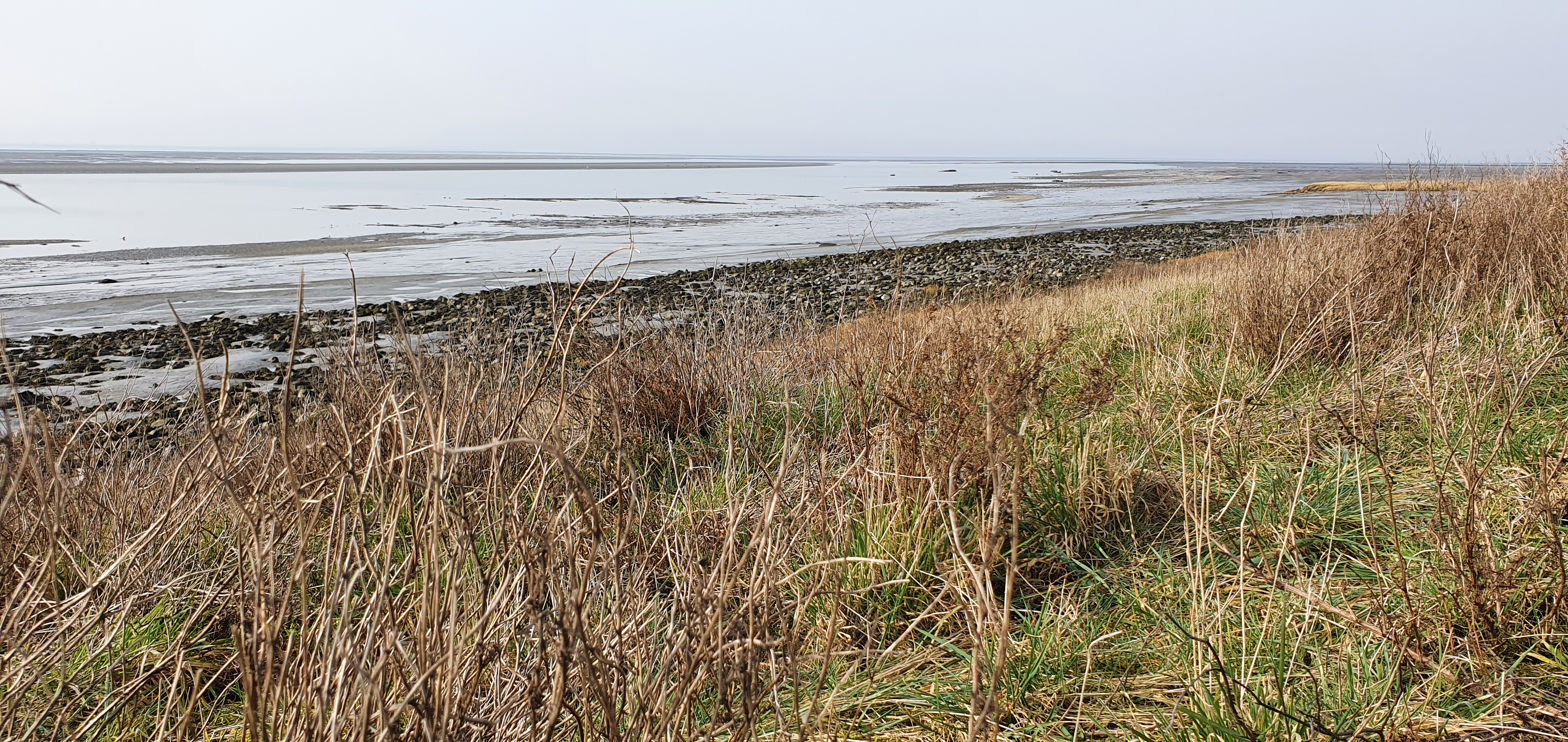
Western Scheldt

==== Western Scheldt, the Netherlands ====
The first land reclamation efforts in the southwestern Rhine-Meuse delta in the Netherlands date back to the Middle Ages. Since then, the area has experienced multiple storms and extreme weather conditions, amongst which the flood disaster of 1953 which led to the construction of the Delta Works. The construction of dams, locks and storm surge barriers, and the strengthening and raising of dikes in the area, initially increased flood safety. However, over time, the land behind dikes started to sink which is highly problematic in the face of sea-level rise.

In the Western Scheldt, a strategy similar to TRM has been proposed to naturally raise the land. During high tide, the Western Scheldt delivers sediment to the areas outside of the embankments. As a result, these areas naturally rise with water levels. This is illustrated by het verdronken land van Saefthinge, an area that lies outside of the embankments but has a higher elevation than other areas that are protected by embankments in Zeeland. Following this example, exchange polders, in Dutch called wisselpolders, are proposed. Exchange polders make use of natural sedimentation processes to create a buffer of elevated land along the estuary, protecting the land behind the dikes against flooding. Exchange polders can be created by breaching the seaside embankment to allow tidal water to flow into the embanked area. A second embankment on the other side of the polder stops the tidal water from flowing further land inwards. The area between the embankments would be reconnected to the Western Scheldt and should therefore gradually silt up as the tidal water slows down. Exchange polders have not been implemented yet, because the plan has been critiqued by local farmers. They question the idea of giving land back to nature as there is already a shortage of space in The Netherlands, and are afraid of increased salinisation in the area.

=== Creation of low energy aquatic conditions ===
Some sedimentation enhancing strategies focus specifically on creating low energy conditions in shallow water. Sediment deposition occurs when the water flow slows down, as the water no longer has the energy to carry heavier sediment particles and so they sink. Examples of strategies that stimulate low energy conditions are semi-permeable structures made of materials such as wood, twigs and brushwood.

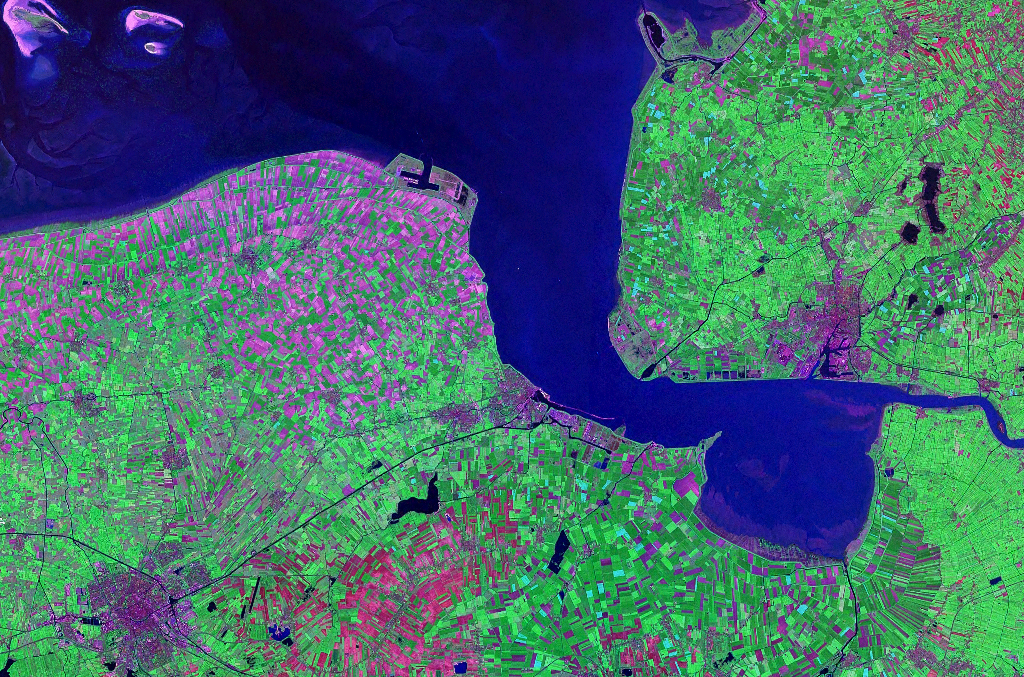
Ems-Dollard estuary

==== Ems-Dollard estuary, the Netherlands and Germany ====
The Ems-Dollard estuary is located on the border between the Netherlands and Germany and has a high silt concentration. However, the silt cannot settle on the delta plains due to flood control levees that disconnect the land from the water. Additionally, channels in the area have been widened and deepened over time for navigation, increasing the strength of the tidal inland flood current and weakening the ebb current back to the sea, resulting in a surplus of silt being transported from the sea into the estuary.

Silt concentration in the Ems-Dollard estuary increased from 40 mg/L in 1954 to 80–100 mg/L currently, significantly reducing the water quality. The more silt water contains the more turbid the water is, which reduces the amount of light that can penetrate the water and inhibits algae growth. Algae are primary producers: they use CO_{2}, water and light to produce oxygen and food for other aquatic animals. Reduced algae growth therefore impacts oxygen and food availability for the entire food chain. Climate change climate change-induced sea-level rise may negatively impact primary production and the food chain, but may also drown the Ems-Dollard system, so pilot sedimentation projects are being executed in the estuary. The aim is to trap silt particles on kwelders, which are land areas covered with vegetation that lie outside of the embankments. This can be done by placing willow groynes, wooden posts connected with branches, in the ground along the kwelder, slowing down the water and encouraging sedimentation, which may eventually create new land.

Another way in which silt sedimentation is stimulated in the Ems-Dollard estuary is by the construction of double dikes. The area in between the dikes is filled with water by a controlled culvert, where silt can settle more easily due to low flow or stagnant water conditions. The settled silt can be used to make clay which is used to strengthen and raise dikes in the area.

==== Wulan delta, Indonesia ====
The Wulan delta is located in the Demak district, northern Java, Indonesia. Northern Java's deltaic shorelines suffer from severe coastal erosion. More than 3 kilometres of the Demak shoreline has already been lost to the sea. The main causes of coastal erosion are the conversion of mangrove forests to aquaculture, land reclamation for coastal infrastructure, and groundwater extraction causing land subsidence. Mangrove restoration has been proposed as a strategy to halt coastal erosion in the district of Demak. Solely replanting mangroves in the area was not possible, because the wave exposure, submersion time and sediment conditions were no longer optimal. Instead, a strategy similar to the willow groynes in the Ems-Dollard estuary was implemented. Semi-permeable barriers were built along the Demak coast using local materials such as bamboo, twigs and other brushwood. These structures let sea and river water pass through, dampen waves, capture sediment and create sheltered, low-energy conditions near the shoreline for sediment accretion. The main idea behind this strategy is that mangroves seeds will colonise the area naturally when the shore bed level accretes high enough.

Initially, the permeable structures captured considerable amounts of sediment raising bed levels behind the structures. Some locations were naturally recolonised by mangroves, in other locations mangroves were replanted. However, juvenile mangroves only survived in the best protected sedimentation basins. Elsewhere, they disappeared again after a few years because the bed level dropped below sea level again due to subsidence.

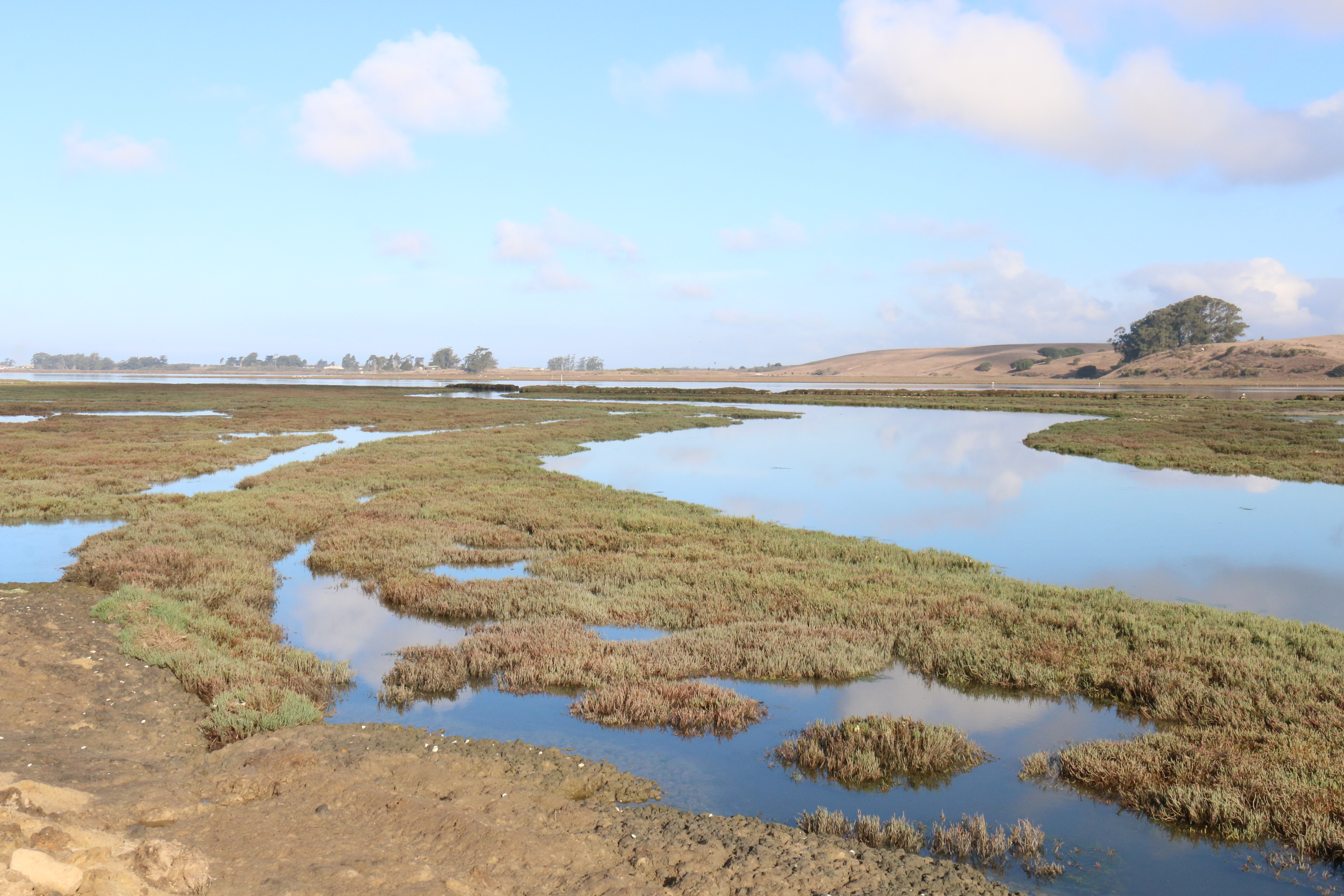
Example wetland landscape

=== Wetland restoration ===
Coastal wetlands are ecosystems temporarily or permanently flooded by water. Wetland vegetation serves important functions: it attenuates incoming waves and encourages sediment deposition. The resulting rise in land elevation allows some wetlands to keep up with sea-level rise. Many wetlands have been converted to other land uses by constructing dikes, seawalls and embankments to prevent water encroachment. As a result, wetlands are disconnected from hydrological input and no longer receive sediment, which inhibits land raising and can result in land elevation loss. One strategy to restore wetlands is depolderisation, which entails breaching dikes and reconnecting wetlands to rivers, estuaries or the sea, restore the natural hydrology and land-building capacities of wetlands.

==== Biesbosch, the Netherlands ====
Depolderisation has occurred in a polder in the Biesbosch under the Dutch Room for the River program. The Biesbosch is a 9000-ha freshwater tidal wetland in the southwestern part of the Netherlands. Water and sediments were reintroduced to the Noordwaard, an agricultural polder in the Biesbosch, in 2008. The embankments were lowered by 2 meters to reconnect the Biesbosch wetlands with the Merwede river, a distributary of the lower Rhine. This project aimed to allow flooding during peak discharges of the Rhine and Meuse rivers, with the restored tidal and flood dynamics encouraging ecosystem restoration. The results of this restoration effort were that the Biesbosch area trapped approximately 46% of the incoming sediment, and the average aggradation rate was 5.1 mm per year. In February 2020, the Noordwaard polder flooded for the first time due to high water levels in the rivers caused by a storm and spring tide.

==== Sacramento-San Joaquin delta, California, USA ====
Wetlands in the Sacramento-San Joaquin delta are rapidly losing elevation. Under natural conditions, wetlands in the delta were frequently flooded. The soil was waterlogged and anaerobic, and under these conditions organic carbon accumulates faster than it decomposes, resulting in soil accumulation. However, wetlands in the Sacramento-San Joaquin delta have been drained for agricultural purposes, so the soil is now situated at or above the water table where it can oxidize and decompose quickly resulting in a loss of elevation. Many former wetlands in the area are now more than 6 meters below mean sea-level and subsidence rates of up to 5 cm per year have been found. Shallow flooding of land is a strategy used to reduce subsidence and restore wetlands in the delta. Adding a layer of water to the soil restores anaerobic conditions, which results in the accretion of new peat and increases surface elevation. Mean rates of land surface elevation gain in the study wetlands were 4 cm per year.

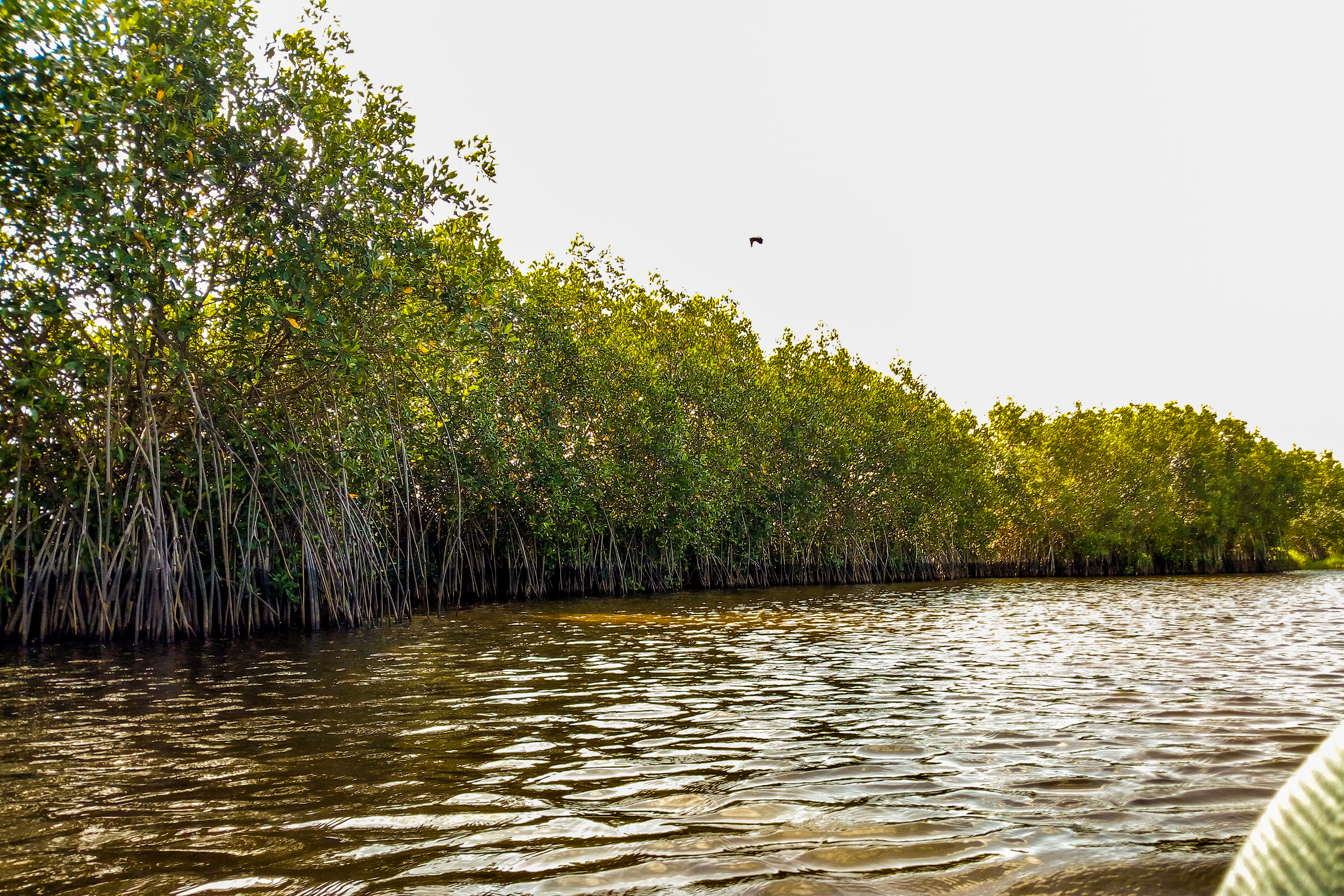
Mangroves

=== Mangrove restoration ===
Mangroves provide a wide range of ecosystem services, such as habitat for aquatic species, carbon sequestration, and their root systems reduce the impact of incoming waves and capture sediment resulting in land elevation gain. Mangroves also play a role in mitigating the effects of climate change and extreme weather events. For all these reasons, mangrove forests are one of the most powerful nature-based solutions to climate change. However, almost 70 percent of mangroves are currently lost or degraded, and they are still rapidly deteriorating. Mangrove forests can be restored in several ways, for example through providing space for expansion or by replanting. If relieved from human pressures, mangrove species can quickly recolonise degraded areas, depending on the availability of seeds and the ability of seeds to access degraded areas. In areas where seeds cannot easily migrate, replanting is the best option.

Mangrove restoration efforts have taken place in the Mahakam delta, Indonesia. From the 1990s onwards, the mangrove forests in the delta have been under intense pressure from aquaculture: 60-75% of mangrove forests in the Mahakam delta have been converted into shrimp ponds. Since 2000, private oil and gas companies have funded various mangrove replanting efforts. From 2001 to 2005, Total E&P Indonesia planted over 3.5 million trees in the delta, covering an area of 646 ha. Total E&P invest in mangrove rehabilitation for various reasons, for instance to reduce erosion and ecosystem degradation which is seen as a threat to gas operations, and because pipelines installed to transport oil and gas caused mangrove clearing. Additionally, between 2002 and 2007 the Department of Forestry of the Indonesian government also planted 819 ha of mangrove forests. Restoration programs funded by the government and the oil and gas industry focus on replanting mangroves in abandoned shrimp ponds and encouraging combined mangrove-shrimp aquaculture, also called silvofishery. Mangroves can recover rapidly in the area if the physical environment of the delta is not destroyed: every year, hundreds of hectares of cleared areas in the Mahakam delta are naturally recolonised by mangrove vegetation, causing accretion.

There is also evidence of sedimentation in restored mangroves in Vietnam.

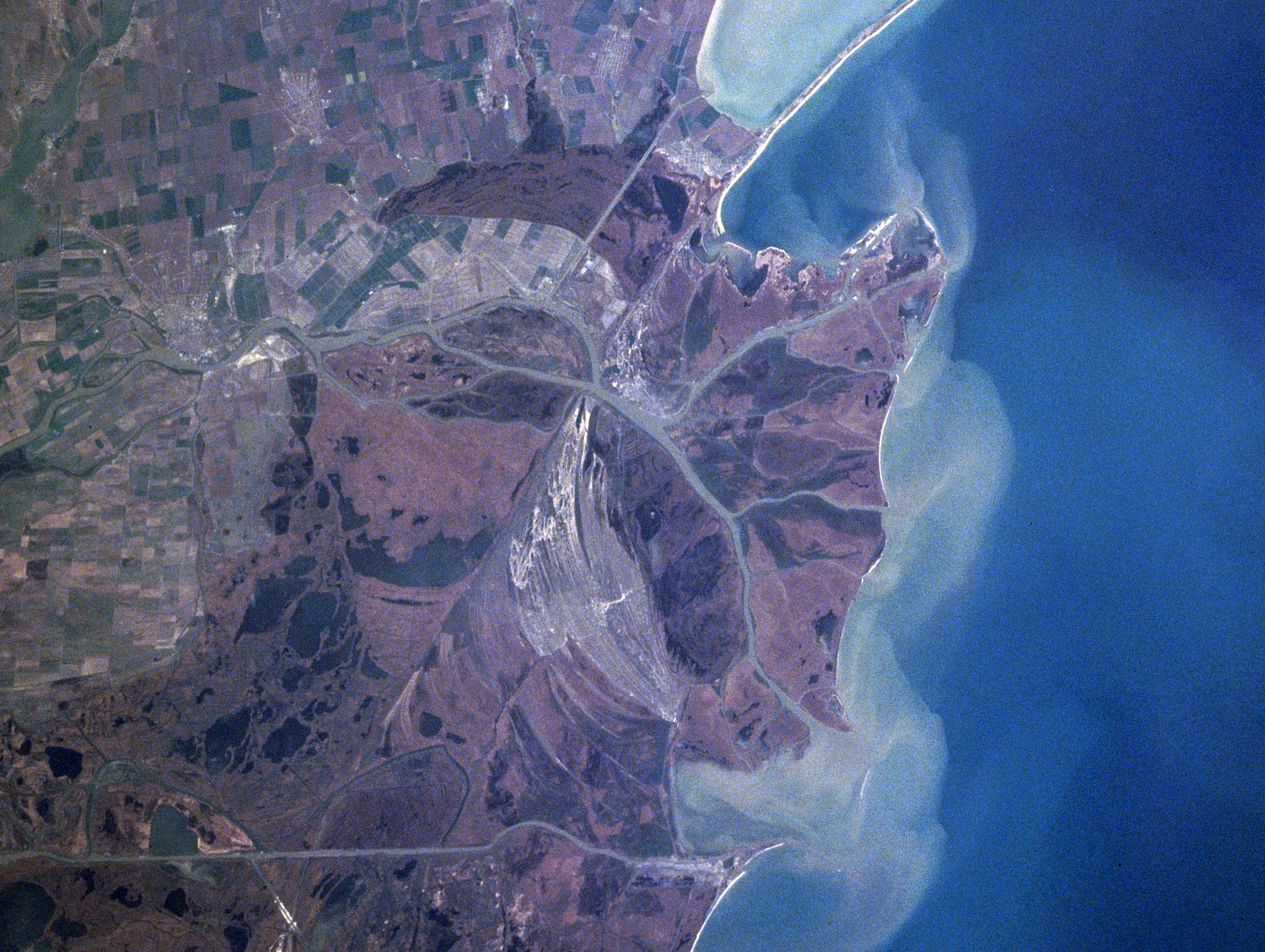
Danube delta

=== Construction of channel networks ===
The construction of dams reduces the sediment load in rivers downstream. Levees and embankments also inhibit the deposition of sediment on the delta plain, resulting in the loss of land elevation. Research has shown that cutting and dredging of shallow, narrow channels on the delta plain can be an effective strategy to increase the input of freshwater and sediments to floodplains, lakes and lagoons in deltas.

Shallow, narrow channels have been dug in the Danube delta (Romania). The main reason for digging the channels was that fisheries in the Danube delta were negatively impacted by the limited freshwater delivery to the deltaic lakes and lagoons. The construction of the channel network in the Danube delta almost tripled the water influx toward the delta plain. However, at the same time sediment delivery in the lower Danube river reduced due to the construction of dams upstream. Interestingly, sediment deposition on the delta plain did not decrease after dam constructions. It has been estimated that the average sediment flux in the Danube delta increased from 0.07 g/cm^{2} under natural conditions to 0.09-0.12 g/cm^{2} after the construction of shallow, narrow channels, which could mean a sedimentation rate of 0.5-0.8 mm per year. This suggests that the artificial channels function as sediment traps that can assist in preventing delta drowning due to sea-level rise. However, erosion along the Danube coast has increased since the construction of channels. Similar results have been found in the Ebro delta: channels dug there for rice cultivation deliver sediments to the delta plain resulting in land accretion rates that may be fast enough to keep up with sea-level rise.

=== Breaching levees ===
Flooding is a vital source of fresh water and sediment supply to floodplains, important for land elevation maintenance, soil fertilization, and the support of healthy wetland ecosystems. Levees prevent floods, creating polders that no longer receive water or sediment and therefore lose elevation. Additionally, due to the construction of polders in upstream parts of deltas, floodwater can no longer be stored on upstream floodplains, causing larger floods downstream. A strategy to restore the input of freshwater and sediment to floodplains is intentionally breaching or significantly lowering levees to allow flooding to occur during peak discharges.

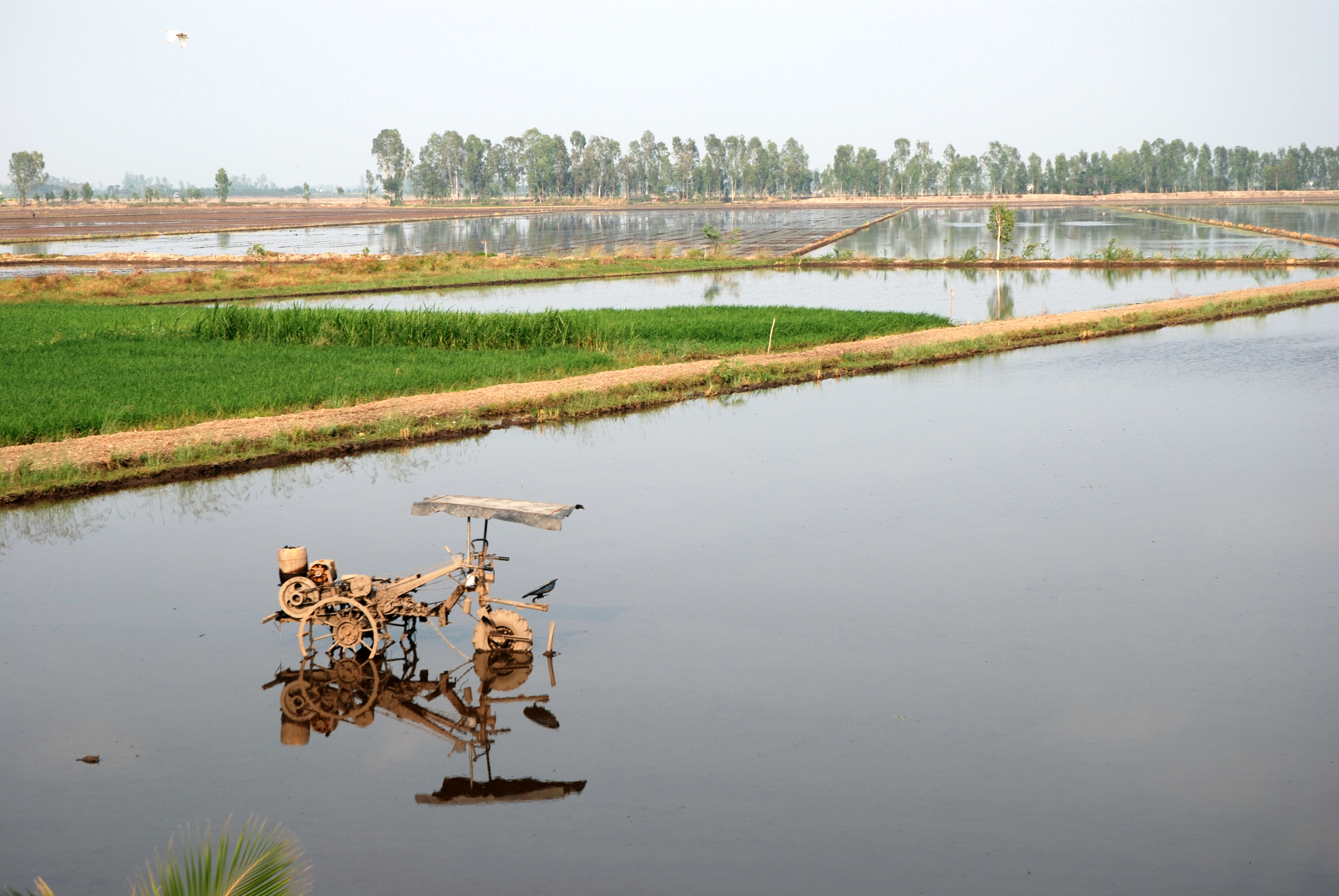
Mekong delta

Plans are being made to lower and breach levees in the upper Mekong delta in Vietnam near the border with Cambodia, an area that would normally flood during peak water discharge season from July to December. However, in many areas high levees have been constructed to protect against flooding year-round. With this full flood protection, farmers in the Mekong delta can produce more rice crops per year compared to a system with lower or no levees. However, preventing floodwater and sediment from entering the Vietnamese floodplains resulted in increased peak river discharges and flood risks downstream, reduced flood retention capacity of floodplains, accumulation of agrochemicals in the soil, and reduced or eliminated sediment deposition contributing to accelerated land elevation loss. To ameliorate these negative impacts, steps are being taken in the upper Mekong delta to lower levees. This would allow flood water to enter the plains only during peak season. During the rest of the year, the lower embankments provide sufficient protection for farmers to cultivate their lands.

=== Tidal replicate method ===
A novel eco-engineering solution to preserve existing intertidal wetlands from sea-level rise has been implemented in a coastal wetland at Kooragang Island in Hunter Wetlands National Park, Newcastle, Australia. Due to the construction of levees and internal drainage in the area during the 20th century, tidal water was prevented from entering the wetlands. Although tidal flows were already reintroduced in the early 2000s, the site's hydrology and topography favoured the expansion of mangroves. This created a situation in which mangroves expanded rapidly at the expense of other saltmarsh vegetation, resulting in a deeper tidal inundation similar to that experienced with sea-level rise.

To recreate desired natural tidal conditions, a strategy called the tidal replicate method was applied. The tidal replicate method creates an artificial tidal regime through an automated tidal control system which the authors call SmartGates. The gates manipulate the tidal flow reaching the wetland area and mimic the tidal conditions necessary to recruit and establish wetland vegetation. The site, which would have been inundated under natural conditions, has effectively re-established saltmarsh vegetation following the implementation of the novel method. Although the primary aim of this strategy is restoring saltmarsh vegetation, vegetation captures sediment and can therefore enhance natural sedimentation processes.

== See also ==
- Beach nourishment
- Coastal sediment supply
- Dam
- Environmental impact of reservoirs
- Soft engineering
- Stream restoration
- Wetland conservation
- Intertidal wetland
