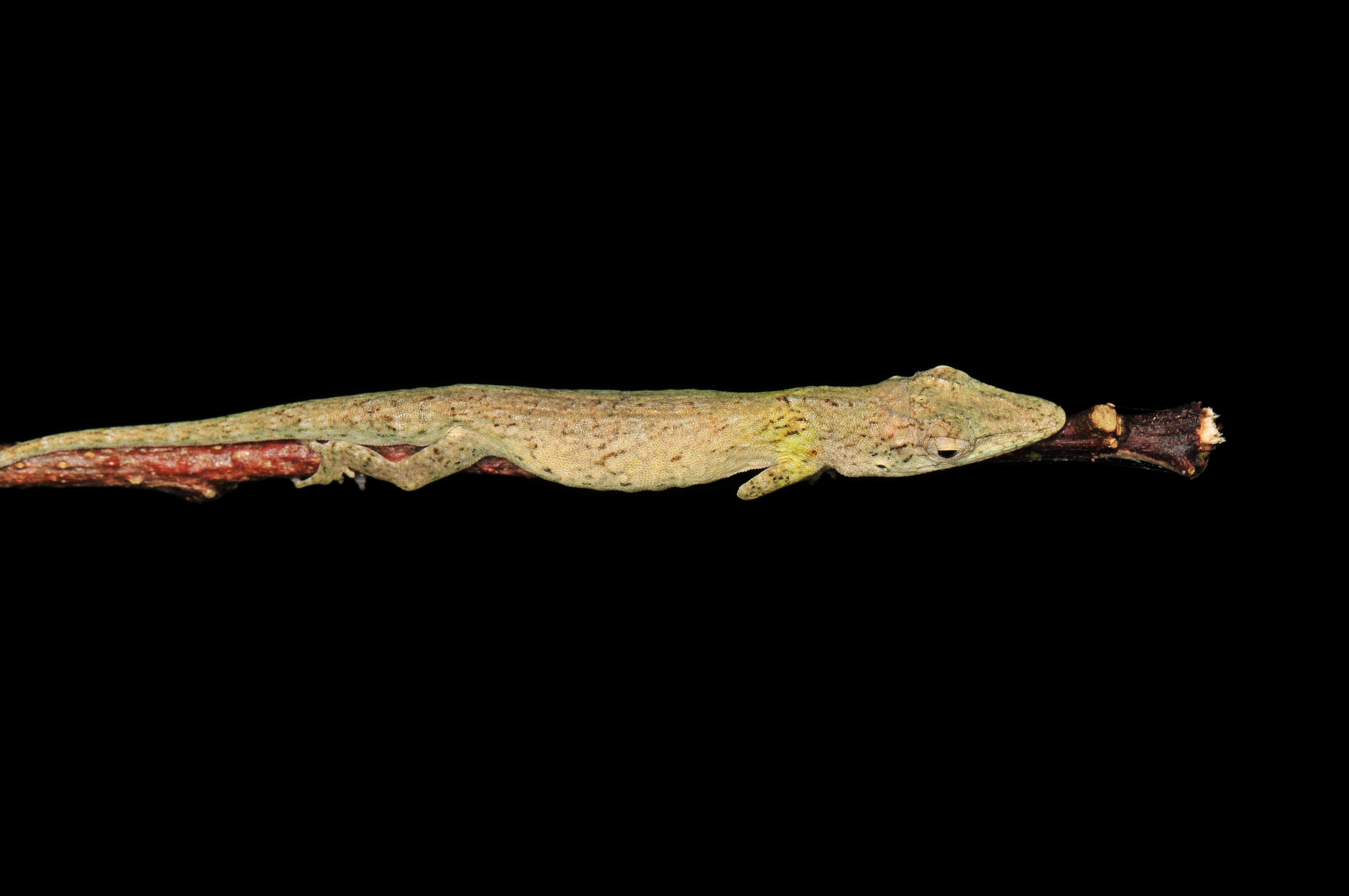

Conservation status
- Least Concern (IUCN 3.1)

Scientific classification
- Kingdom: Animalia
- Phylum: Chordata
- Class: Reptilia
- Order: Squamata
- Suborder: Iguania
- Family: Anolidae
- Genus: Anolis
- Species: A. occultus

Binomial name
- Anolis occultus Williams & Rivero, 1965

= Anolis occultus =

Species of reptile

The Puerto Rican twig anole or dwarf anole (Anolis occultus) is a species of small, arboreal anole endemic to Puerto Rico and primarily inhabiting the Cordillera Central from the Sierra de Cayey range in the Southeast to the central-western ranges of Maricao. A mostly grey to olive-brown bodied lizard, A. occultus is the smallest of the Puerto Rican anoles with a snout to vent length of 34–42 mm. In comparison to other twig anoles, A. occultus is extremely cryptic through its unique sleeping behaviors and mottled pattern. Sleeping behavior including site selection minimizes the probability of predator encounter along with A. occultus' extensive list of antipredator behaviors.

== Phylogeny ==
In Puerto Rico, Anolis is represented by 10 separate species. All share adaptations to live primarily arboreal, diurnal lives, while being insectivorous. In comparison to all other Puerto Rican anoles, A. occultus is smaller in size and has a smaller, elongated head. The scales of the head are much smaller in this lizard. The dewlap is also sparsely scaled laterally and tucks under the heavily scaled skin of the throat, which is unique to this species. The mostly closely related lizards by similarity in features include A. fuscoauratus, A. Chloris, and A maculiventris.

== Description ==
A. occultus is a slender lizard with a downwards sloping snout and very short limbs. This anole is a small lizard averaging only 1.25 inches in snout to vent length. In contrast to other anole species, both sexes of A. occultus look identical in appearance. The tail of A. occultus is rounded and has small dorsal, overlapping scales. The coloration of the lizard varies and can be shades of white, brown, olive-green, yellowish-green, or dark orange. A. occultus has a mottled, cryptic pattern on its head and body with distinct body banding running from its neck to its vent. The head is grey with sparse dark mottles and the eyelids are a lighter yellow coloration. The flanks are yellowish grey and turn slightly green towards the limbs. The ventral side of the lizard is white besides speckling on the throat and tail. A. occultus has the ability to change color with ease and become slightly darker or lighter in a short period of time. The lizard has radiating eye lines and one or two visible yellow spots on the base of the tail. It has a pinkish-grey dewlap that is folded into an opening on the front of the chest. A. occultus has a different scale pattern than other Anoles in that it has no enlarged or elongated scales. Its dorsal scales of the head and tail are very small and smooth. The lizard's head is narrow and elongated with oval nostrils. The ears are small, round are located far back on the lizard's head behind the corner of the mouth. Middorsal scales are smooth, flat, and equal in size to the scales on the flank. The ventricles scares are slightly larger than flank or dorsal scales, but still smooth and round. The gular fan, or dewlap, is large in this species and present in both males and females. The dewlap is slotted, so it falls into the general skin of the neck and has much smaller scales than the rest of the body. The limbs are short and have much smaller scales than the dorsal or ventral scales. However, the scales on the limbs remain smooth like the other parts of the body.

== Habitat and distribution ==
A. occultus is largely an arboreal lizard and is most commonly found in the canopies of the forest. It can also be found in bushes, ferns, and close to the edge of the forest suggesting this species is not restricted to the canopy layer. This lizard is endemic to Puerto Rico and is found throughout the forest of the Cordillera Central mountain range that spans the midline of Puerto Rico from west to east. The species has been found from 65m to 1,326 m above sea level at the highest mountain top in this mountain range. These mountain forest dwellers were observed perching on vines and twigs of the forest canopy from the Sierra de Cayey range in the southeast to the central-western mountain ranges of Maricao. These lizards like to associate themselves with openings in the canopy and narrow path cuts in the edges of the forest. They do not like to inhabit trees or bushes where the canopy is closed overhead or to the side. A. occultus are observed from heights just above the forest floor to 4.5 m above the ground in structures of twigs and vines.

=== Home range ===
A. occultus inhabit the peripheral foliage of the mountain rangers and is best defined as a canopy-dwelling species. A. occultus prefers bare twigs and vines in clearings of the canopy. They will not occupy any vegetation in an area with a closed canopy. Twigs are selected carefully as sleeping perches. These lizards show a preference for dense vegetation during the day and no particular preference for dead or living foliage for selection of sleeping perches. A. occultus prefers dead twigs and vines in close proximity to breaks in the forest canopy. A. occultus required a relatively dense bundle of twigs and vines in the canopy with close proximity to an opening where the sky is visible. It seems that the lizards would therefore also occupy the clearing in edges of the forest but this has not been indicated by any research.

== Diet ==
A. occultus is primarily insectivorous preying on insects smaller than itself. It has also one of the Anolis species that is nectavorous. This species can perch on twigs and vines and consume nectar from flower buds on the Camasey Almendro plant. The anole is able to stabilize itself on these perches to eat by wrapping its tail around surrounding twigs.

== Ecology and behavior ==
=== Reproduction and social behavior ===
A. occultus is an oviparous lizard meaning it produces young by laying eggs that are hatched later. Male and females are often found sleeping within inches of each other suggesting pair-bonding behavior. It is thought that these lizards form pair-bonds because of the occurrence of males and females close together despite the relative rarity of these lizards compared to other lizards in Puerto Rico. This suggests these lizards form a monogamous pair because of the unlikely probability that these lizards are found in pairs by chance.

=== Enemies and antipredator behavior ===
A. occultus is preyed upon by birds, snakes, and spiders because of their elevated perches in the forest canopy. The adult Loggerhead Kingbird is a very common predator to these lizards and can attack them on branches off the ground. These lizards select perches to sleep on that are a quarter inch or diameter or less and they cling tightly to this perch with their hands, feet, and tail while they sleep. The anoles are at increased danger at night because they are elevated in the air and unaware of their surroundings. They select more exposed areas in the canopy than normal when they sleep in order to warm themselves on cool mornings. By doing this, they can maximize the number of hours they are active during the daytime. This makes them an easy target for avian predators and arthropods that can attack these lizards on their sleeping perches. A. occultus do have a cryptic existence in the foliage because of their long and slender body that allow them to merge easily with the outline of a twig. They forfeit much of this camouflage by exposing themselves at night, but position themselves to minimize this loss of crypsis. Due to this increased vulnerability at night, this anole can reduce the chance of encountering a predator using crypsis and by selecting microhabitats that are less frequently coinhabited by predators. While avian predation is reduced at night, arthropod predation increases for wandering lizards. Therefore, remaining stabilized on a perch is an antipredator behavior itself. By positioning its body parallel to its perch, these lizards are able to stay very inconspicuous with their mottled patterns. A. occultus sleeps most often on horizontal twigs with its mouth facing the outer edge of the twig. The species also selects twigs that are often too skinny and fragile to support larger predators such as snakes. They have been observed selecting perches higher in the forest canopy at night in order to reduce the probability of predator encounter. Their selection for sleeping sites is strongly based on their diurnal behavior. They tend to occupy sleeping sites that are both higher and less stable than their daytime perches to reduce nocturnal predation. A. occultus select specific sleeping sites and adopt the sleeping position with their head to the outside of the perch to enable approaching predator detection. Furthermore, the tail of A. occultus had been determined to be sensitive to vibration explaining why they wrap their tails around their perches. Besides stabilization, they can detect the vibration of approaching predators through their perch and flee in time. When captured, these lizards release a high-pitched scream which serves to startle an attacking predator.

== Conservation ==
A. occultus has been assessed by IUCN as Least Concern because of its widespread observance throughout Puerto Rico. It is unlikely that any population declines are occurring because of the in-place land/water protection in managed forests and National Parks. However, Puerto Rico's Department of Natural and Environmental Resources' (DNER) suggests that the conservation status should be 'Data Deficient'. Furthermore, there is a growing need for an accurate assessment of A. occultus' population status and research into the threats and habitat trends that could put this species in danger. Deforestation has been a serious issue in Puerto Rico's land-use history and information regarding climate change projections and habitat changes need to be explored. For the effective conservation of A. occultus, research on the degree of deforestation and how this is damaging these lizard's habitat is required. Urbanization of deforested areas is causing severe changes to habitat. These changes in habitat introduce new predators to these lizards on the edges of urban areas. Introduced predators include raccoons, domestic animals, and feral cats, which prove particularly harmful to the A. occultus population. In the 1940s only 6% of forest cover remained because agriculture still made up the vast majority of the Puerto Rican economy and deforestation was very prevalent. Few areas of the forests on the island remained unaltered by humans. The market began to shift after the 1940s and agriculture was taken over by industry allowing for regrowth of the forest over many years. 42% of the forest has recovered according to scientists conducting measurements 60 years later. Rural to urban migration and industrialization of a former agricultural economy has resulted in the regeneration of Puerto Rican forests. Rapid regrowth of forests means that the composition of plants differed substantially between different areas. Novel plants contributed to the regrowth of the forests and isolated these lizards into patches of native vegetation. They are very specific in the vegetation they require to be able to select suitable perches and bask in direct sunlight underneath the openings in the canopy. Populations of A. occultus have remained fragmented in these native vegetation patches and have had little recolonization success in the dividing novel vegetation patches in post-agriculture Puerto Rico.

== See also ==
- Fauna of Puerto Rico
- List of endemic fauna of Puerto Rico
- List of reptiles of Puerto Rico
