= Mahakam River =

River in Kalimantan, Indonesia

Mahakam
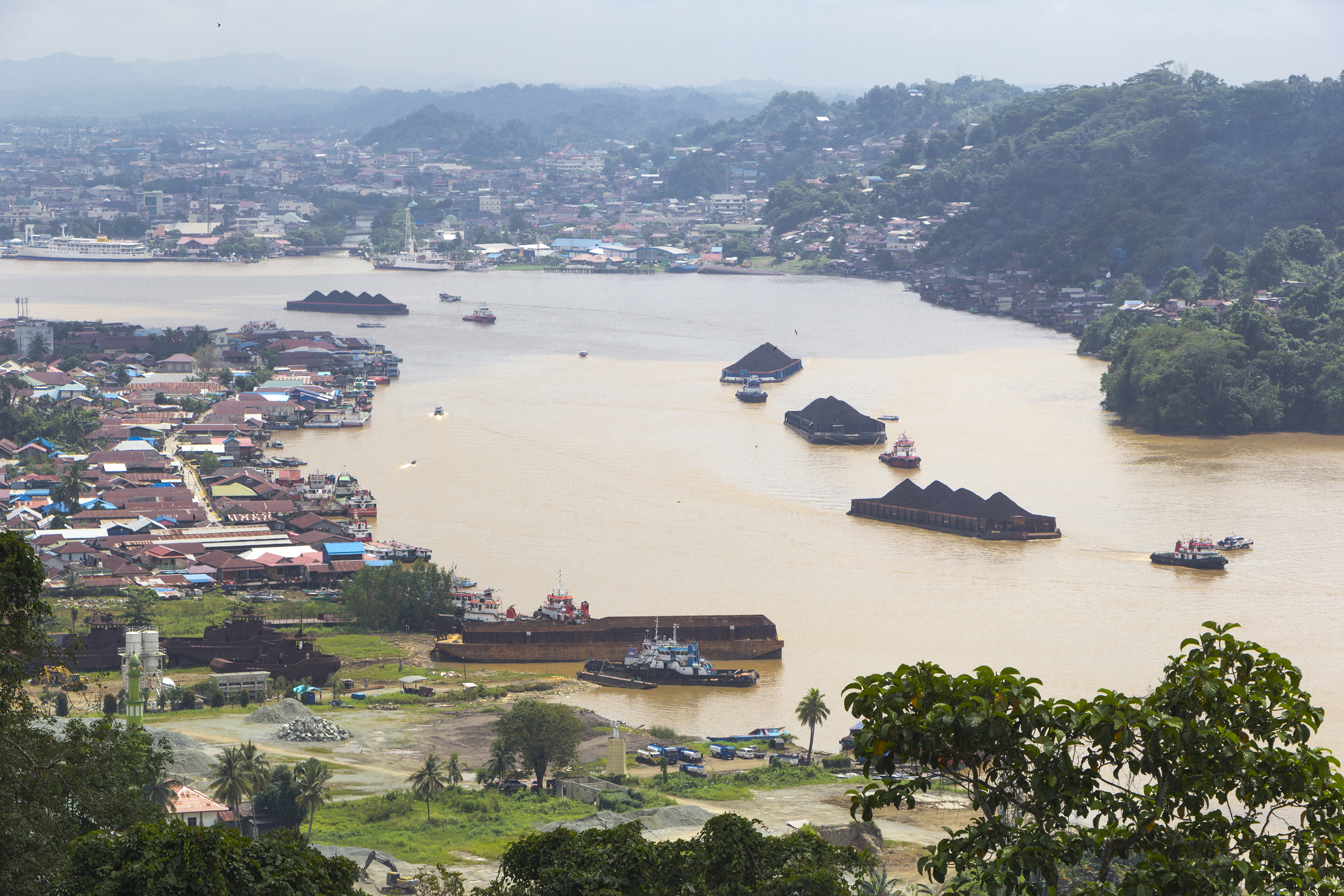
- Mahakam River at Samarinda

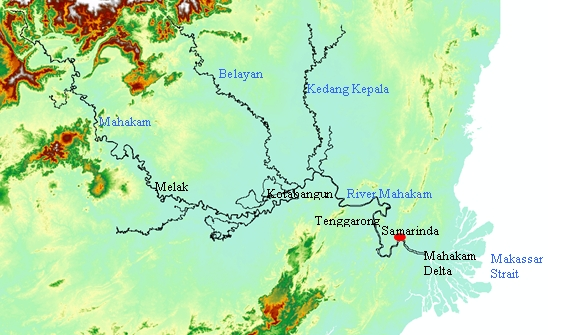

Location
- Country: Indonesia
- Province: East Kalimantan (basin extends to North Kalimantan and delta branches extend to Nusantara Capital Specific Region)
- Towns/Cities: Samarinda, Tenggarong, Sebulu, Muara Kaman, Kota Bangun, Melak, Long Iram

Physical characteristics
- Source: Cemaru
  - location: Indonesia
  - coordinates: 1°16′59.142″N 114°28′31.0296″E
  - elevation: 1,681 m (5,515 ft)
- Mouth: Makassar Strait
  - location: Indonesia
  - coordinates: 0°35′6″S 117°16′33″E
  - elevation: 0 m (0 ft)
- Length: 980 km (610 mi)
- Basin size: 77,095.51 km^{2} (29,766.74 mi^{2})
- Width
  - minimum: 145 m (476 ft)
  - average: 300 m (980 ft)
  - maximum: 1,260 m (4,130 ft)
- Depth
  - average: 15 m (49 ft)
  - maximum: 60.2 m (198 ft)
- Discharge
  - location: Mahakam Delta
  - average: (Period: 2003–2016)4,278 m^{3}/s (151,100 cu ft/s)

Basin features
- Progression: Makassar Strait
- River system: Mahakam River
- Tributaries
  - left: Melaseh, Tepai, Nyaan, Boh, Medang, Pariq, Muyub, Pela, Belayan, Telen, Kedang Rantau
  - right: Usok, Danum Parae, Kosso, Cihar, Ratah, Kedang Pahu, Bongan, Jembayan

Mahakam River in Kalimantan

The Mahakam River (Indonesian: Sungai Mahakam) is the third longest river (with the third greatest volume discharge) in Borneo after the Kapuas River and the Barito River, and is located in East Kalimantan province of Indonesia. It flows 980 kilometers (610 miles) from the district of Long Apari in the highlands of Borneo, to its mouth at the Makassar Strait.

The city of Samarinda, the provincial capital of East Kalimantan, lies about 48 kilometers (30 mi) from the river mouth. The delta of the Mahakam River has a specific micro climate which is influenced by high and low tide at sea level. The southernmost branch of the delta is part of provincial border between East Kalimantan and Nusantara Capital Specific Region.

== Summary ==
The Mahakam River is the largest river in East Kalimantan, Indonesia, with a catchment area of approximately 77,100 km^{2}. The catchment lies between 2˚N to 1˚S latitude and 113˚E to 118˚E longitude. The river originates in Cemaru from where it flows south-eastwards, meeting the River Kedang Pahu at the city of Muara Pahu. From there, the river flows eastward through the Mahakam lakes region, which is a flat tropical lowland area surrounded by peat land. Thirty shallow lakes are situated in this area, which are connected to the Mahakam through small channels. Downstream of the connection with the Semayang and Melintang lakes, the Mahakam meets three other main tributaries – the rivers Belayan, Kedang Kepala, and Kedang Rantau – and flows south-eastwards through the Mahakam delta distributaries, to the Makassar Strait.

== Geology ==
Kalimantan, where the Mahakam lies, is part of the Sunda Continental Plate. The large island has mountain ranges between Indonesia and Malaysia. As described by van Bemmelen (1949), River Mahakam rises in Cemaru (1,681 meters (5,515 feet)) in the center of Kalimantan, and from there it cuts through the pre-tertiary axis of the island east of the Batuayan (1,652 meters (5,420 ft)) and then reaches the tertiary basin of Kutai. Its middle course traverses a lowland plain with many marshy lakes. This intermontane depression is separated from the neighboring basin, the Barito depression, by a broad hilly tract of less than 500 meters (1,600 ft) altitude. After this region, the Mahakam cuts through the Samarinda anticlinorium and reaches its alluvial delta, which spreads like a broad fan over the shelf-sea, with a base of 65 kilometers (40 mi) and a radius of about 30 kilometers (19 mi).

Upstream of Long Iram (upstream part of Mahakam river basin), the river is flowing in tertiary rocks (Voss, 1983). Between Long Iram and Muara Kaman (middle Mahakam area) the river is flowing in quaternary alluvium, while in the downstream area between Muara Kaman and the coast including the Mahakam delta, tertiary rocks are again present. The presence of the large delta is explained by the formation and rejuvenation of the hilly region near Samarinda.

== Climate ==
The Mahakam catchment is around the equator. The average annual rainfall in the catchment area is 3,163 mm. The average runoff is around 1,911 mm. According to the Köppen climate classification, this area belongs to type Af (tropical rainforest) and has a minimum temperature of ≥18 °C, while precipitation during the driest month in a normal year is ≥60 mm The transfer of mass and energy in the tropical zone occurs through general air circulation known as the Hadley cell. According to Seidel et al. (2008), the precipitation pattern in this area is largely determined by this large-scale atmospheric wind pattern, which is observable in several ways throughout the atmosphere. This circulation carries moisture into the air, generating rainfall in equatorial regions, whereas the edges of the tropical belt are drier. Within this circulation, evaporation occurs intensively around the equator on the center of low pressure called the Intertropical Convergence Zone (ITCZ), characterized by the accumulation of clouds in the area. The ITCZ moves following the pseudo-motion of the sun within the 23.5°N and 23.5°S zone, therefore its position always changes according to this motion.

The ITCZ drives the Indo-Australian monsoon phenomena which influence the regional climate including the Mahakam catchment. In December, January, and February (winter in the Northern Hemisphere) the concentration of high pressure in Asia and low pressure in Australia make the west wind blow in Indonesia (west monsoon). In June, July, and August concentration of low pressure in Asia (summer in the Northern Hemisphere) and a concentration of high pressure in Australia make the east wind blow in Indonesia (east monsoon). Due to the global air circulation and the regional climate mentioned above, the Mahakam catchment which is located around the equator has a bimodal rainfall pattern with two peaks of rainfall, which are generally occurred in December and May. This is because the ITCZ passes through the equator twice a year, from the Northern Hemisphere in September and from the Southern Hemisphere in March.

== Discharge ==
Average discharge of the Mahakam River at Melak (Upper Mahakam), Kota Bangun (Middle Mahakam) and Loa Kulu (Lower Mahakam).

Year	Discharge (m^{3}/s)		
Year	Melak	Kota Bangun	Loa Kulu
1994	1,564		
1995	1,647		
1996	2,020	2,855	
1997	1,884.8		
2004	1,396		
2005	2,350.95	2,808.95	
2007	2,109	2,791.8	
2009	1,485		
2010	2,022	2,823.52	5,478.5

Average monthly flow (Q–m^{3}/s). Mahakam River at Samarinda:

Month	2014	2014– 2018	2021
JAN	4,083.38	5,401	3,751.53
FEB	5,863.29	6,965.6	5,290.07
MAR	5,754.92	6,506.5	5,405.59
APR	6,628.15	6,620	5,079.46
MAY	4,151.29	6,121.3	3,898.19
JUN	1,701.62	4,522.7	3,966.51
JUL	1,972.29	3,492	2,674.38
AUG	544.1	2,067.5	1,615.62
SEP	335.68	2,898.4	1,186.52
OCT	638.61	2,914.2	1,226.31
NOV	2,409.33	4,541.5	3,638.79
DEC	5,610.11	5,558.1	2,902.16
Avg.	3,307.7	4,800.7	3,386.26

Average discharge:

Year, period	Discharge	Ref.
Mahakam Delta 0°34′43.3236″S 117°15′49.9176″E
2016–2020	5,953 m^{3}/s (210,200 cu ft/s)	
2003–2016	4,278 m^{3}/s (151,100 cu ft/s)	
1985–2012	4,150 m^{3}/s (147,000 cu ft/s)	
1970–2000	123 km^{3}/a (3,900 m^{3}/s)	
	4,560 m^{3}/s (161,000 cu ft/s)	
Samarinda 0°31′18.282″S 117°9′14.3352″E
2021	3,386.26 m^{3}/s (119,585 cu ft/s)	
2014–2018	4,800.73 m^{3}/s (169,536 cu ft/s)	
2014	3,307.7 m^{3}/s (116,810 cu ft/s)	
2012	5,000 m^{3}/s (180,000 cu ft/s)	
1996–2005	122.248 km^{3}/a (3,873.8 m^{3}/s)	
Loa Kulu 0°31′35.652″S 117°1′45.7356″E
2010	5,478.5 m^{3}/s (193,470 cu ft/s)	
Tenggarong 0°26′39.7968″S 117°0′10.566″E
1985–2012	123 km^{3}/a (3,900 m^{3}/s)^{*}	
Kota Bangun 0°13′31.9476″S 116°35′18.762″E
1996, 2005, 2007, 2010	2,819.8 m^{3}/s (99,580 cu ft/s)	
Muara Muntai 0°21′49.608″S 116°23′48.066″E
2010	2,798.24 m^{3}/s (98,819 cu ft/s)	
Melak 0°13′49.7064″S 115°50′0.0312″E
2012	2,500 m^{3}/s (88,000 cu ft/s)	
1998–2010	2,000 m^{3}/s (71,000 cu ft/s)	
1994–2010	1,831 m^{3}/s (64,700 cu ft/s)	

^{*} Minimum 375 m^{3}/s, maximum 12,200 m^{3}/s (record 24,156 m^{3}/s in 2012)

== Lakes ==
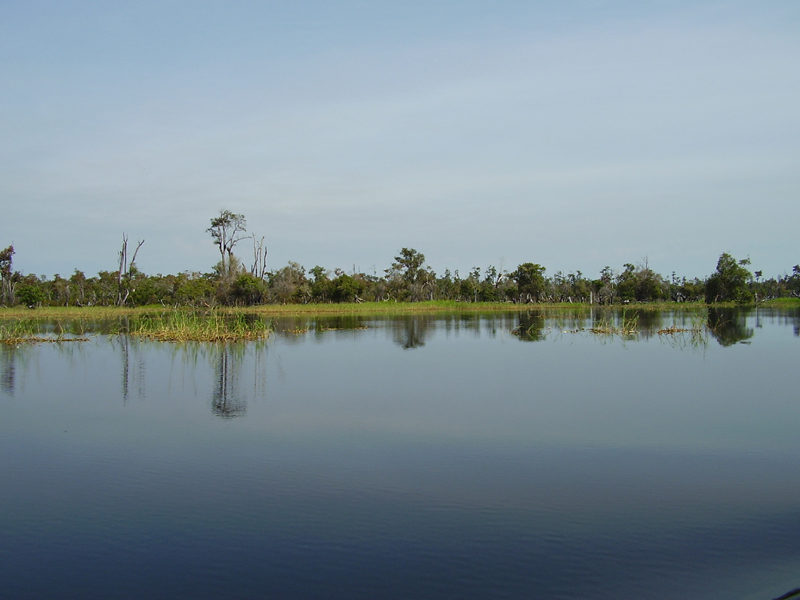
Lake Melintang at Teluk Tuk with a re-growing burnt swamp forest in the background

There are about 76 lakes spread in the Mahakam river basin and about 30 lakes are located in the middle Mahakam area including the three main lakes (Lake Jempang 15,000 Ha; Lake Semayang 13,000 Ha; Lake Melintang 11,000 Ha). The lake levels are seasonally fluctuated from 0.5 m – 1 m during the dry period to seven meters during the rainy season. The Mahakam lakes and surrounding wetlands act as water storage as well as a trap of sediment contained in the water flowing into the lakes which are now known to become shallower, presumably as a result of an imbalance between sediment input and slow subsidence.

Fishing is the primary source of livelihood in the Mahakam lakes area, most of the people around the lakes are fishermen. The middle Mahakam Lake area is an area of intensive fishing activity with a productivity of 25,000 to 35,000 metric tons per year since 1970.

Mahakam Lakes:

Lake	Coordinates	Eleva-tion (m)	Area (km^{2})	Mean depth (m)	Volume (10^{6}m^{3})	Basin size (km^{2})
Jempang	0°25′18.8436″S 116°15′45.3888″E	1	124.36	2.8	352.83	1,012.3
Semajang	0°14′56.8788″S 116°32′6.2592″E	2	104.56	1.1	117.07	2,192.9
Melintang	0°18′6.3432″S 116°24′16.992″E	2	87.96	1	91.52	1,042.8
Tempatong	0°23′48.8544″S 116°21′18.954″E	2	18.19	1	17.33	3,970.8
Siran	0°5′34.7928″S 116°35′46.3732″E	1	15.48	1.2	17.9	139.1
Uwis	0°19′40.7244″S 116°29′16.4796″E	2	7.47	1.6	11.84	282.9
Melinau	0°7′7.554″S 116°23′48.9516″E	1	5.77	1.3	7.61	933.5
Murung	0°17′40.938″S 116°36′12.4416″E	1	3.23	2.8	9.12	433.8
Kahoypongkol	0°9′45.5616″S 116°24′45.6408″E	2	2.24	0.7	1.54	952.4
Berambai	0°1′55.9416″S 116°20′36.5928″E	0	2.02	1.6	3.26	612.8
Rabok	0°8′13.0596″S 116°24′23.5296″E	2	1.45	0.5	0.725	933.5
Loa Kang	0°13′37.1532″S 116°33′59.598″E	2	0.7	1.3	0.91	2.1
	0°18′6.0048″S 116°36′1.0944″E	2	0.6	2	1.22	6
Biru	0°18′15.0444″S 116°34′26.31″E	1				

== Delta ==
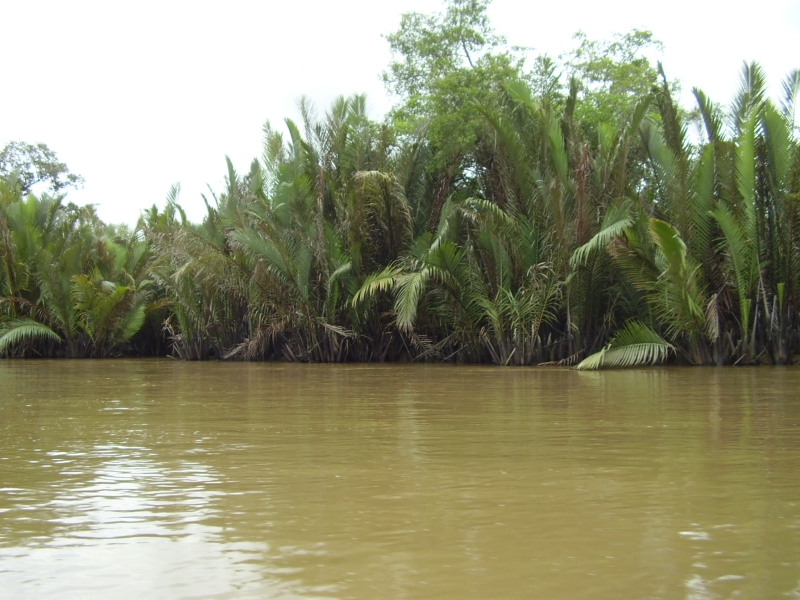
Nypa in Mahakam Delta

The Mahakam delta is a mixed fluvial-tidal dominated delta. The delta covers about 1,800 km^{2} (690 mi^{2}), consisting of mangrove areas near the shore, Nypa swamps in the central areas, and lowland forest near the apex, corresponding to the first bifurcation. Fishery development in this area has converted a vast area of mangrove into shrimp ponds (tambak). However, recent mangrove restoration efforts have taken place in the delta by replanting mangroves in abandoned shrimp ponds and encouraging silvofishery. Many areas in the Mahakam delta are already naturally recolonized by mangrove vegetation contributing to ecosystem restoration. Mangroves also function as sedimentation-enhancing strategies by capturing sediment-causing accretion.

The delta has three main distributary systems directed Northeast, Southeast, and South. The area between distributaries consists of a series of tidal channels generally unconnected to the main distributaries. The distributary channels are narrow and rectilinear with the depth ranging from 8 to 15 meters (26 to 49 ft) and distributary channel bifurcations appear every 10 to 15 kilometers (6.2 to 9.3 mi).

This lower Mahakam area is the second most productive hydrocarbon basin of Indonesia which contains around 3 billion barrels of oil and 30 Tcf of gas reserves. Field geological investigations in this area were started in 1888 and in 1897 exploration drilling discovered oil at a shallow depth of 46 meters (151 ft) on the Louise structure. Production started in 1898 followed by expansion of exploration to the entire Mahakam.

== Tributaries ==
The main tributaries from the mouth:

Left tributary	Right tributary	Length (km)	Basin size (km^{2})	Average discharge (m^{3}/s)^{*}
Mahakam		980	77,243.65	3,897.7
	Loa Haor	120	463.4	11.6
	Jembayan	180	1,365.6	34.7
Karang Mumus		40	318.3	7
	Tenggarong		297.1	6.8
Separi			329.8	9
Kedang Rantau		132	3,631.8	77.8
Kedang Kepala		323.9	15,703.5	582.1
Belayan		319	9,977.3	556.6
Pela (Semayang)		10	2,206.2	65.9
	Kedang Murung		435.1	10.3
	Bongan	20	2,161.4	117
	Kedang Pahu	144	6,800.3	300
Muyub		48	738.2	32.4
	Kelian		270.7	14.4
Pariq		64	1,006.9	50.6
	Ratah		3,302.9	191.7
Merah		51	275	13.8
Medang			839.3	43.5
Alan		32	410.6	22.6
Boh		71	6,624.4	365.1
Nyaan		72	495.8	29
Tepai			797.3	50.8
Melaseh			848.2	59.6
	Cihar		375.4	27.3
Serata			247.9	19
	Kosso		410.4	32.7
Sikê			289.3	23
	Danum Parae		503.3	42.4
	Sihi		265.7	22.4
	Usok		448.5	35.5

^{*}Period: 1971–2000

== Ecology ==
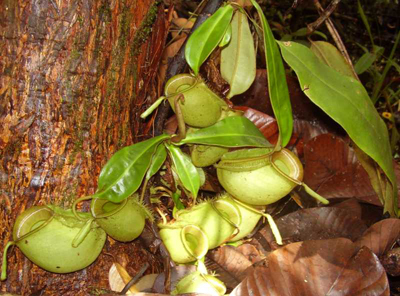
Nepenthes, called kantong semar by the locals, is an insect-eater plant found in the Mahakam peat area

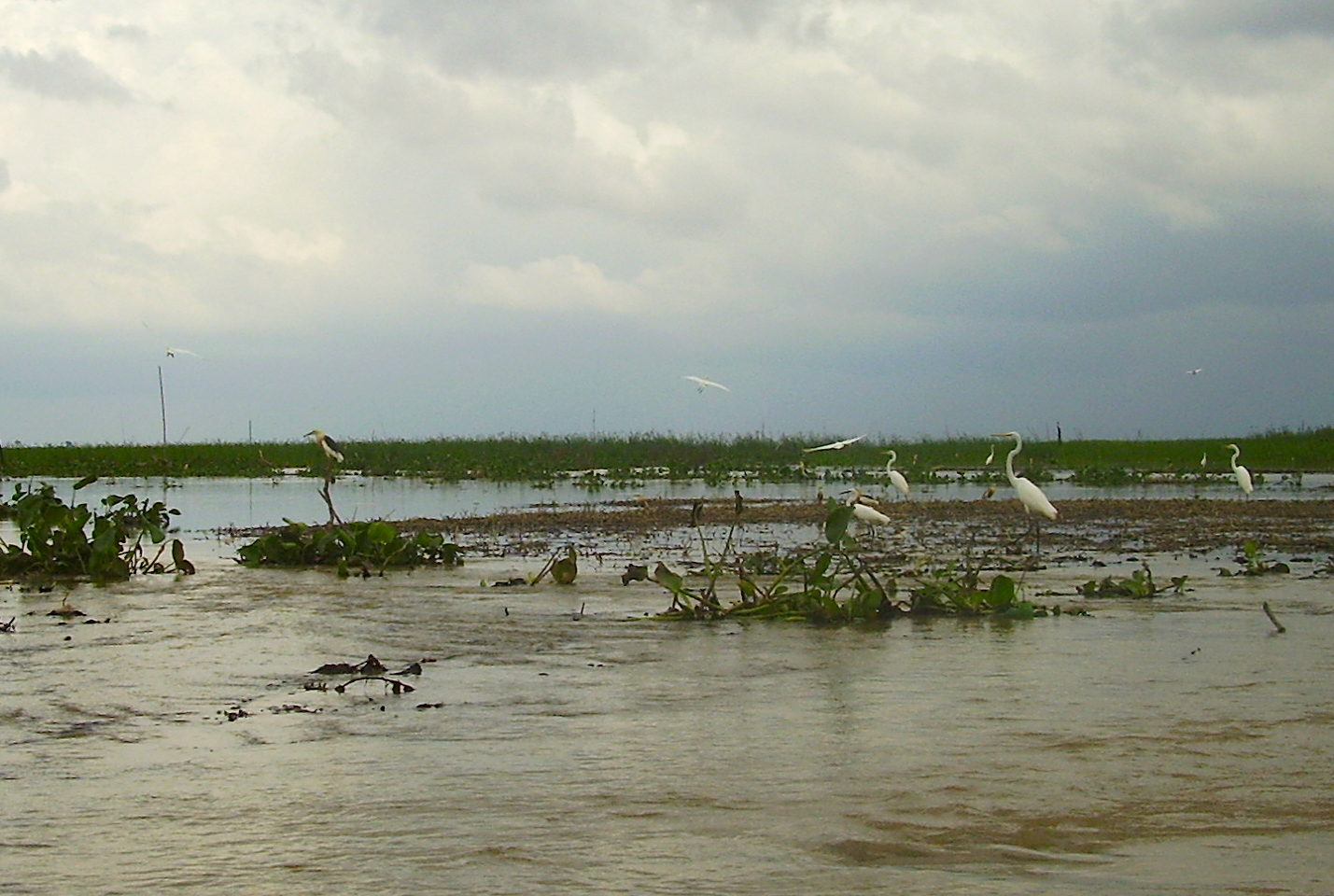
Birds at the intermittent inlet of Lake Jempang from the Mahakam River

Mahakam and its floodplain is an ecologically important region. A total of 147 indigenous freshwater fish species had been identified from the Mahakam. The Mahakam hosts the freshwater dolphin Irrawaddy dolphin (Orcaella brevirostris; called Pesut by local people) a critically endangered species, which is included in CITES (Convention on International Trade in Endangered Species of Wild Fauna and Flora) Appendix I.

The Mahakam river basin is also important breeding and resting place for 298 bird species, among them 70 protected and five endemic species: the dusky munia, Bornean whistler, Bornean peacock-pheasant, Bornean blue-flycatcher and Bornean bristlehead. Some 160,000 ha of the delta has been recognised as an Important Bird Area (IBA) by BirdLife International.

A research cluster (): "Upsetting the balance in the Mahakam Delta: past, present and future impacts of sea level rise, climate change, upstream controls and human intervention on sediment and mangrove dynamics" extensively researches the Mahakam. The cluster's objective is to study the impact of external forcing factors such as sea-level rise, climate change, upstream sediment, as well as human interference on past, present, and future development of the Mahakam delta in different time scales.

=== Pollution ===
Logging and mining activities have contributed to the "alarming rate" of pollution of East Kalimantan's Mahakam River. Tests of water pollutants showed levels increased sharply between 2009 and 2011. Despite the growing pollution, it is claimed that "the water is still safe for consumption."

Unsafe concentrations of heavy metals have been observed in Mahakam fish. A 2015 study found lead concentrations over 1000 times safe levels along with unsafe levels of copper, zinc, and cadmium.

== Bridges ==
Bridges include the 400-meter (1,300 ft) Mahakam Bridge and the 710-meter (2,330 ft) Kutai Kartanegara Bridge. The latter collapsed on 26 November 2011, it took 3 years of planning and one and half years more to rebuild a new bridge on the same spot. The new Kutai Kertanegara Bridge has been open for public use since 8 December 2015, after an opening ceremony held by a local regent.

== Social aspect ==
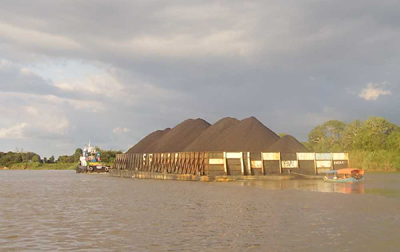
Ponton transporting coal through the Mahakam

The River Mahakam is an economic resource for fishermen and farmers and a freshwater source, as a waterway since ancient times until today. It is in this river basin where the Kutai kingdom evolved. The Kutai history is divided into two periods, Kutai Martadipura (around 350–400 AD) and Kutai Kartanegara period (around 1300). Kutai Martadipura, a Hindu kingdom founded by Mulawarman at Muara Kaman, is regarded as the oldest kingdom in Indonesia. Kutai Kartanegara was founded by settlers from Java at Kutai Lama near the mouth of Mahakam. In around 1565, Islam was extensively spread in Kartanegara by two Moslem preachers from Java, Tunggang Parangan and Ri Bandang.

The Dayaks are the indigenous people inhabiting Kalimantan beside the Kutais and the Banjars. Since the 1970s transmigration of people to East Kalimantan was organized by the Indonesian government, especially in areas near River Mahakam. Transmigration aims to migrate people from overpopulated Java, Bali, and Madura islands to stimulate greater agricultural productivity in the outer islands. By 1973, almost 26% of the land under cultivation in East Kalimantan was being worked by migrants.

== See also ==
- List of drainage basins of Indonesia
- List of rivers of Indonesia
- Kutai Kartanegara Bridge

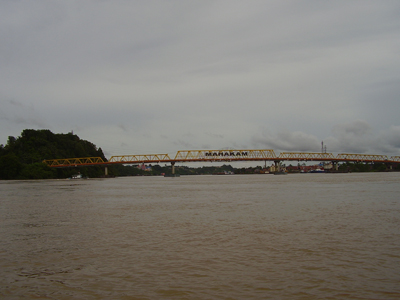
The Mahakam bridge in Samarinda
