= Nekrasovka, Belogorsky District, Amur Oblast =

Nekrasovka Некрасовка
- Selo
- Location within Amur Oblast Location within Russia
- Coordinates: 50°40′N 128°21′E
- Country: Russia
- Region: Amur Oblast
- District: Belogorsky District
- Time zone: UTC+9:00

Nekrasovka (Russian: Некрасовка) is a rural locality (a selo) and the administrative center of Nekrasovsky Selsoviet of Belogorsky District, Amur Oblast, Russia. The population was 432 as of 2018. There are 8 streets being, denisenko street, oktyabrskaya street, school lane, green lane, pasecchnaya street, yubileinaya street, new street and garden street.

== Geography ==
Nekrasovka is located 6 km from the right bank of the Belaya River, 37 km south of Belogorsk (the district's administrative centre) by road. Novonazarovka is the nearest rural locality.
