= Kutai Kartanegara Bridge =

Arch bridge in East Kalimantan, Indonesia; formerly a suspension bridge

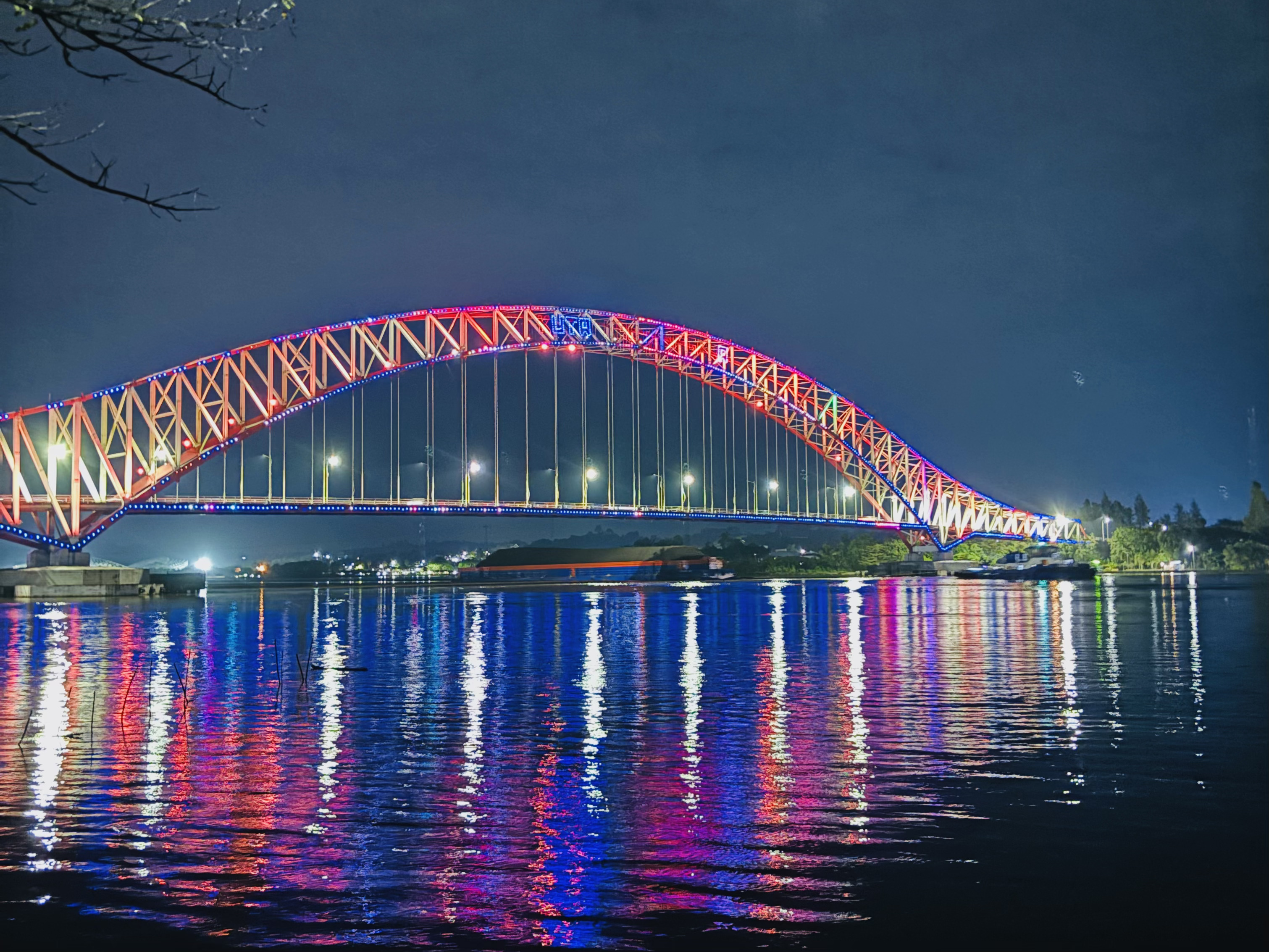
- The bridge as of 2026
- Coordinates: 0.444433°S 117.00288°E
- Crossed: Mahakam River
- Locale: Kutai Kartanegara Regency, East Kalimantan, Indonesia
- Official name: Kutai Kartanegara ing Martadipura Bridge

Characteristics
- Design: Suspension bridge (original) Arch bridge (new)
- Material: Steel
- Total length: 710 m (2,329 ft)
- Longest span: 270 m (886 ft)
- Clearance above: 5 m (16 ft)
- Clearance below: 15 m (49 ft)

History
- Constructed by: PT Hutama Karya
- Construction start: 17 August 1995 (original); 10 April 2013 (new)
- Construction end: 2001 (original); November 2015 (new)
- Opened: Early 2002 (original); 7 December 2015 (new)
- Collapsed: 26 November 2011 (original)

Location
- Interactive map of Kutai Kartanegara Bridge

The Kutai Kartanegara Bridge (also known as the Mahakam II Bridge) is an arch bridge, formerly a suspension bridge, located in Kutai Kartanegara Regency, East Kalimantan, on the island of Borneo in Indonesia. It crosses the Mahakam River and connects Tenggarong and Tenggarong Seberang districts, as well as roads that lead to Samarinda.

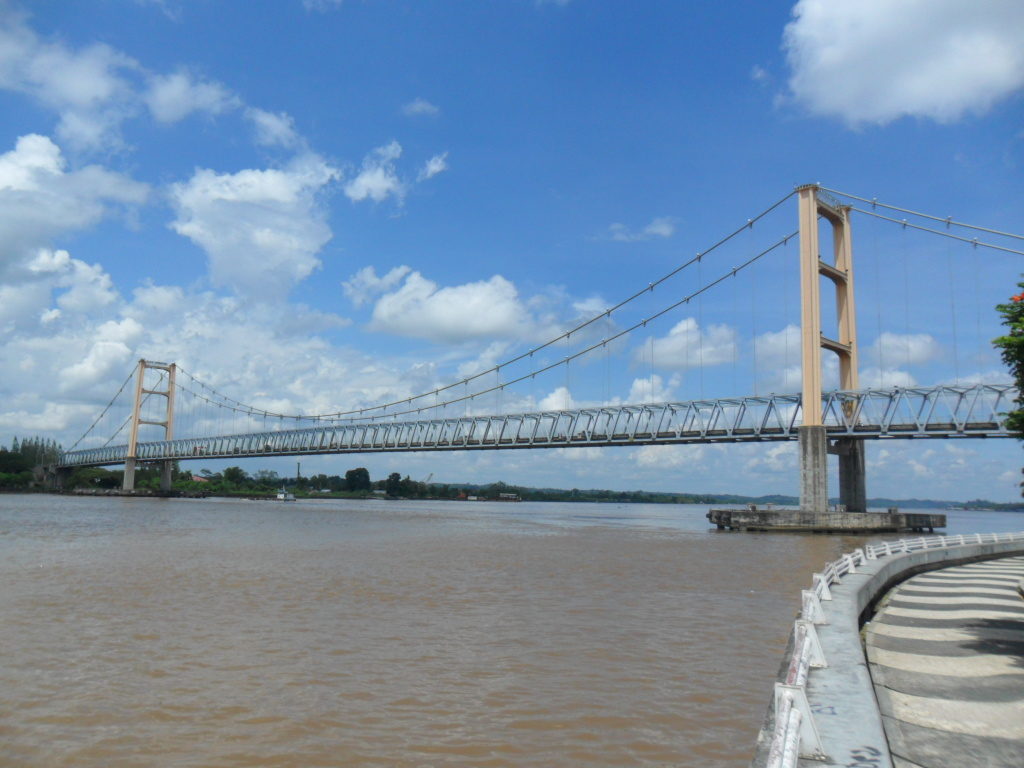
Kutai Kartanegara Bridge, prior to the November 2011 collapse. (April 27, 2011)

The 710-metre-long (2,329 ft) bridge, which featured a 270-metre-long (886 ft) suspended section, was intended to resemble San Francisco's Golden Gate Bridge. Construction on the bridge commenced in 1995 and was completed in 2001. It was the longest suspension bridge in Indonesia.

On 26 November 2011, the bridge collapsed only ten years after it was completed, killing at least 20 people and injuring 39.

The new bridge was constructed by state-owned builders PT Hutama Karya at a cost of Rp 150 billion (US$16.4 million).

== Collapse ==
On 26 November 2011 at around 16:20 (WITA), while workers were performing maintenance on the bridge, a support cable snapped and the structure suffered a catastrophic failure. The roadway fell into the 50-metre-deep (164 ft) Mahakam River below, leaving only the two bridge towers and some support cables remaining. At least 20 people were killed and 40 were injured, with an additional 19 people reported missing. Research findings have shown that the collapse was largely due to construction failure of the vertical hanging clamp. It was also found that poor maintenance, fatigue in the construction material of cable hanger, and the quality of material, may have also impacted the collapse of the bridge.

A replacement arch bridge was built in 2013 and formally opened in December 2015.

Gallery of images after the 2011 collapse
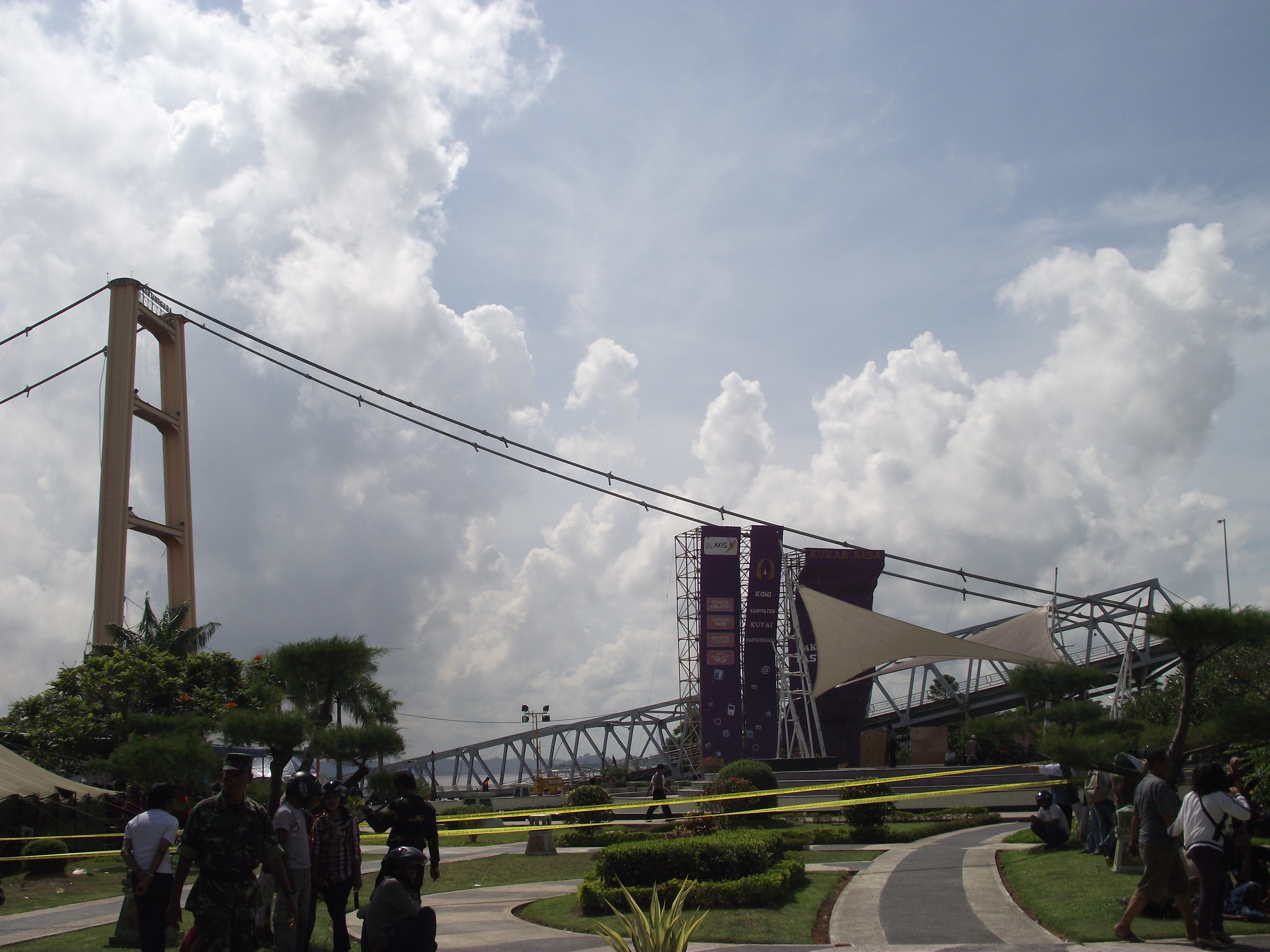
View from the main road

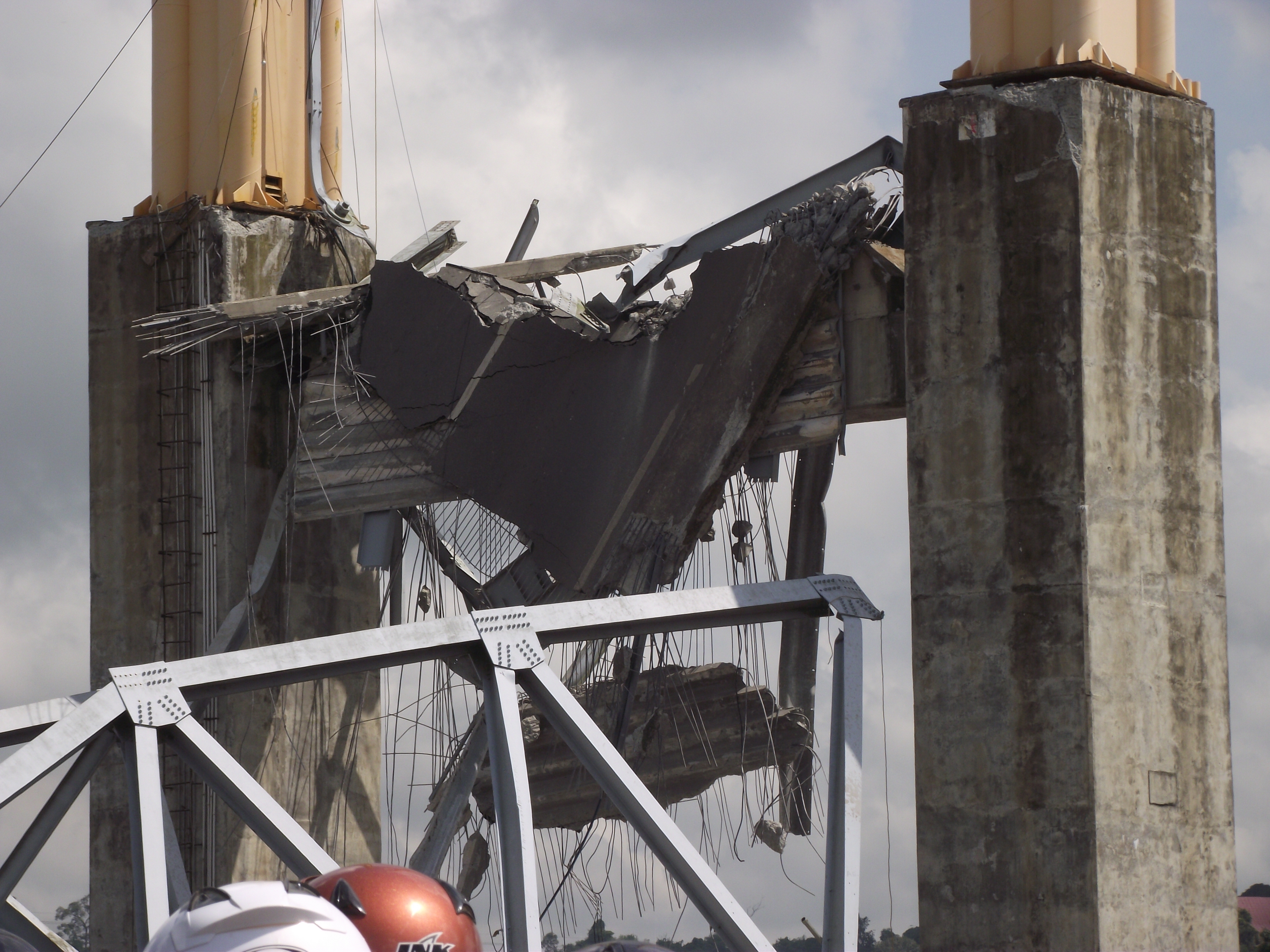
Remains of the bridge

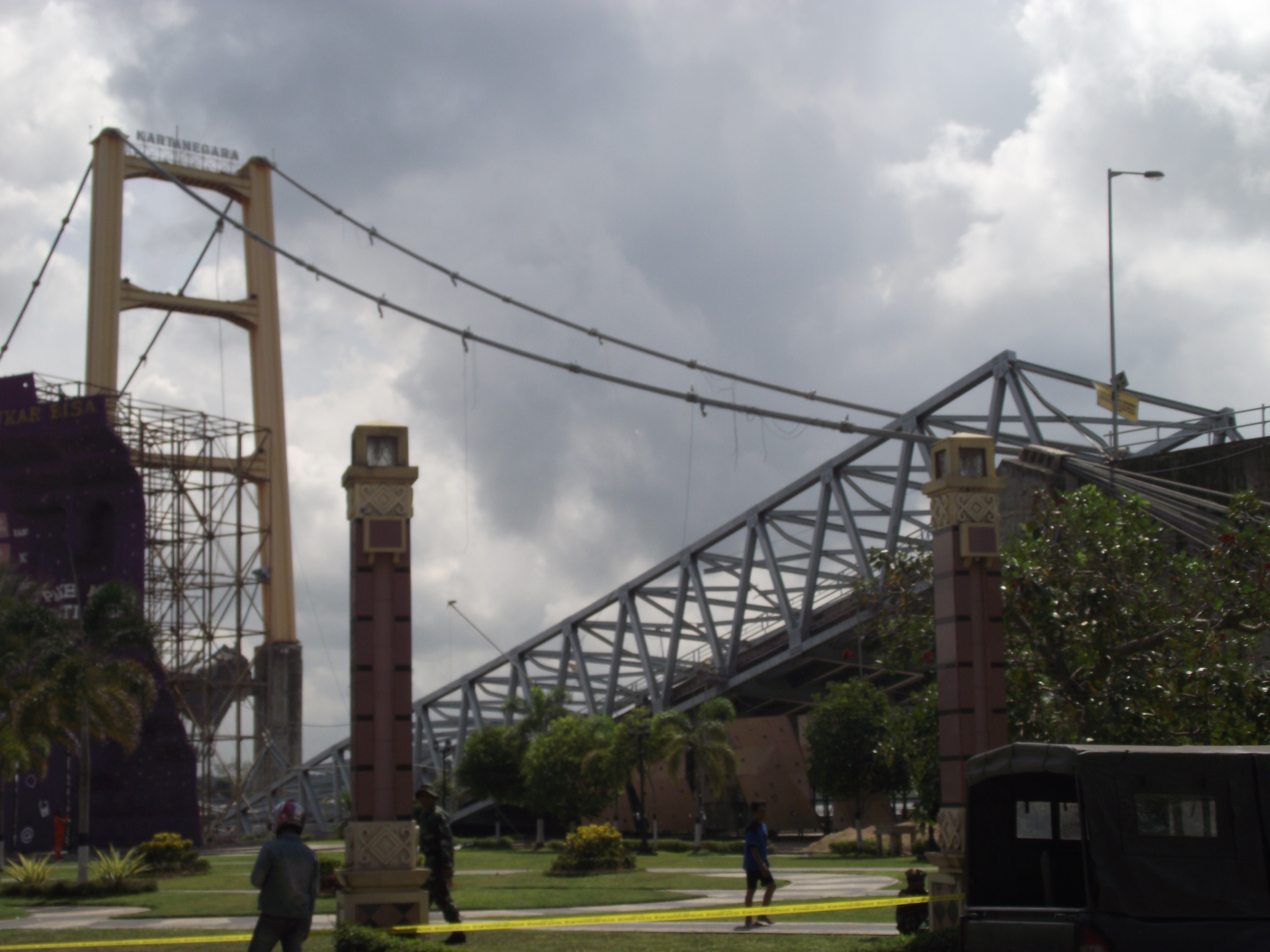
North view

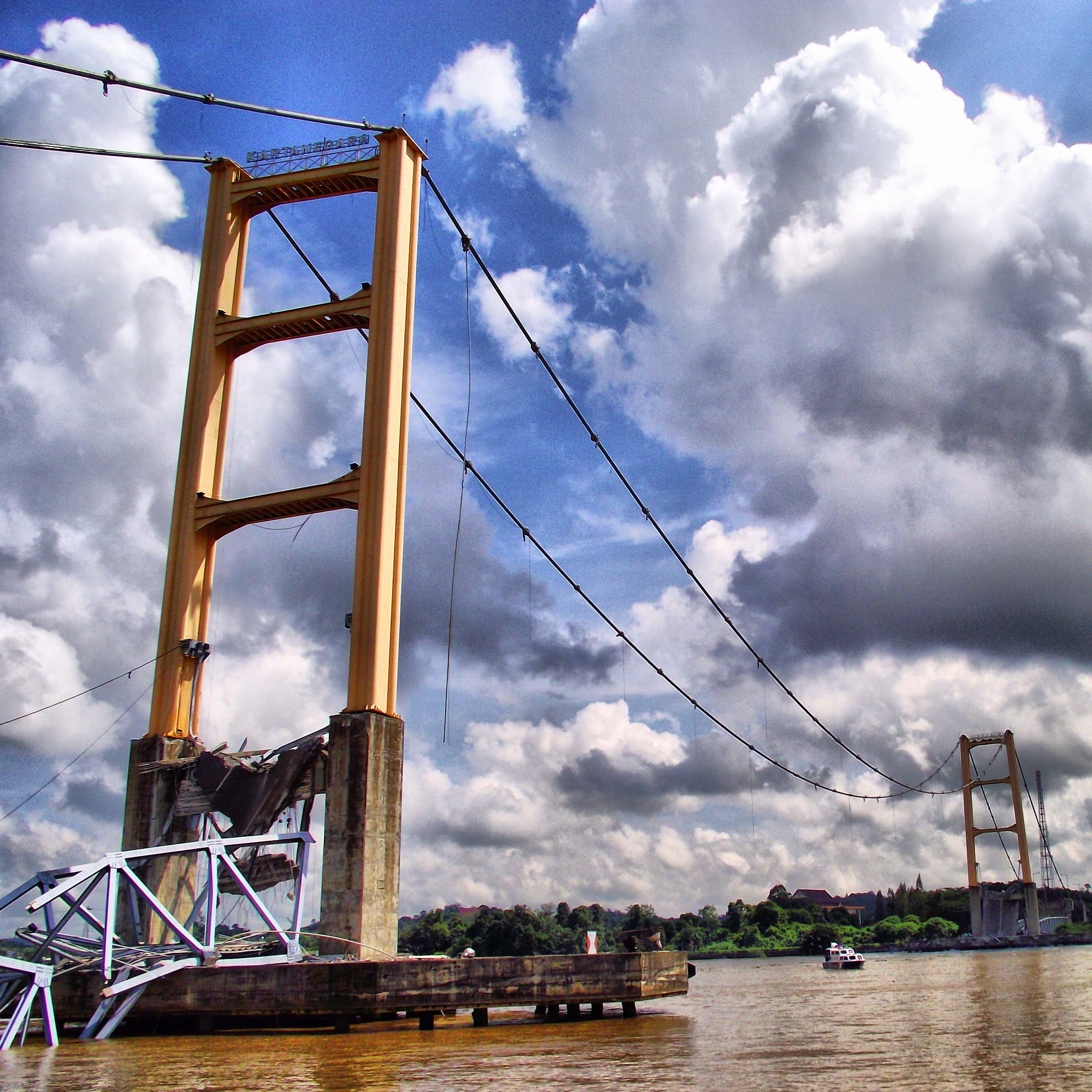
The two remaining pillars
