= USS Barataria =

Two ships of the United States Navy have been named Barataria, after Barataria (or "Barrataria") Bay in Louisiana.

- USS Barataria (1862), a steamer in service in 1863
- USS Barataria (AVP-33), a seaplane tender in commission from 1944 to 1946

Other United States Government ships that have been named Barataria include:

- USC&GS Barataria (1867), a survey ship that served in the United States Coast Survey from 1867 to 1878 and in the United States Coast and Geodetic Survey from 1878 to 1885
- USCGC Barataria (WAVP-381, later WHEC-381), formerly USS Barataria (AVP-33), a Coast Guard cutter in commission in the United States Coast Guard from 1949 to 1969
