= Mid-Barataria Sediment Diversion =

The Mid-Barataria Sediment Diversion was a $2.3-billion sediment diversion project in the Barataria basin in Louisiana. The project aimed to restore river sediment flows into the basin. The intention of the project was to reconnect the Mississippi River and the Barataria basin.

The project broke ground on August 10, 2023, and was cancelled on July 17, 2025.
