= USC&GS Barataria =

History

United States
- Name: Barataria
- Namesake: The Barataria area of Louisiana
- In service: 1867
- Out of service: 1885

General characteristics
- Type: Survey ship
- Length: 95 ft (29 m)
- Beam: 20 ft (6.1 m)
- Draft: 4 ft (1.2 m)
- Propulsion: Steam engine

USCS, later USC&GS, Barataria was a steamer that served as a survey ship in the United States Coast Survey from 1867 to 1878 and in the United States Coast and Geodetic Survey from 1878 to 1885.

Barataria initially entered service in the Coast Survey. When the Coast Survey was reorganized in 1878 to form the Coast and Geodetic Survey, she became a part of the new service.

Barataria operated mostly along the United States Gulf Coast during her career.
