= Belayan River =

Belayan River Sungai Belayan, Lioe Belajan, Sungai Belajan, Soengai Balajan Chinese: 伯拉扬河
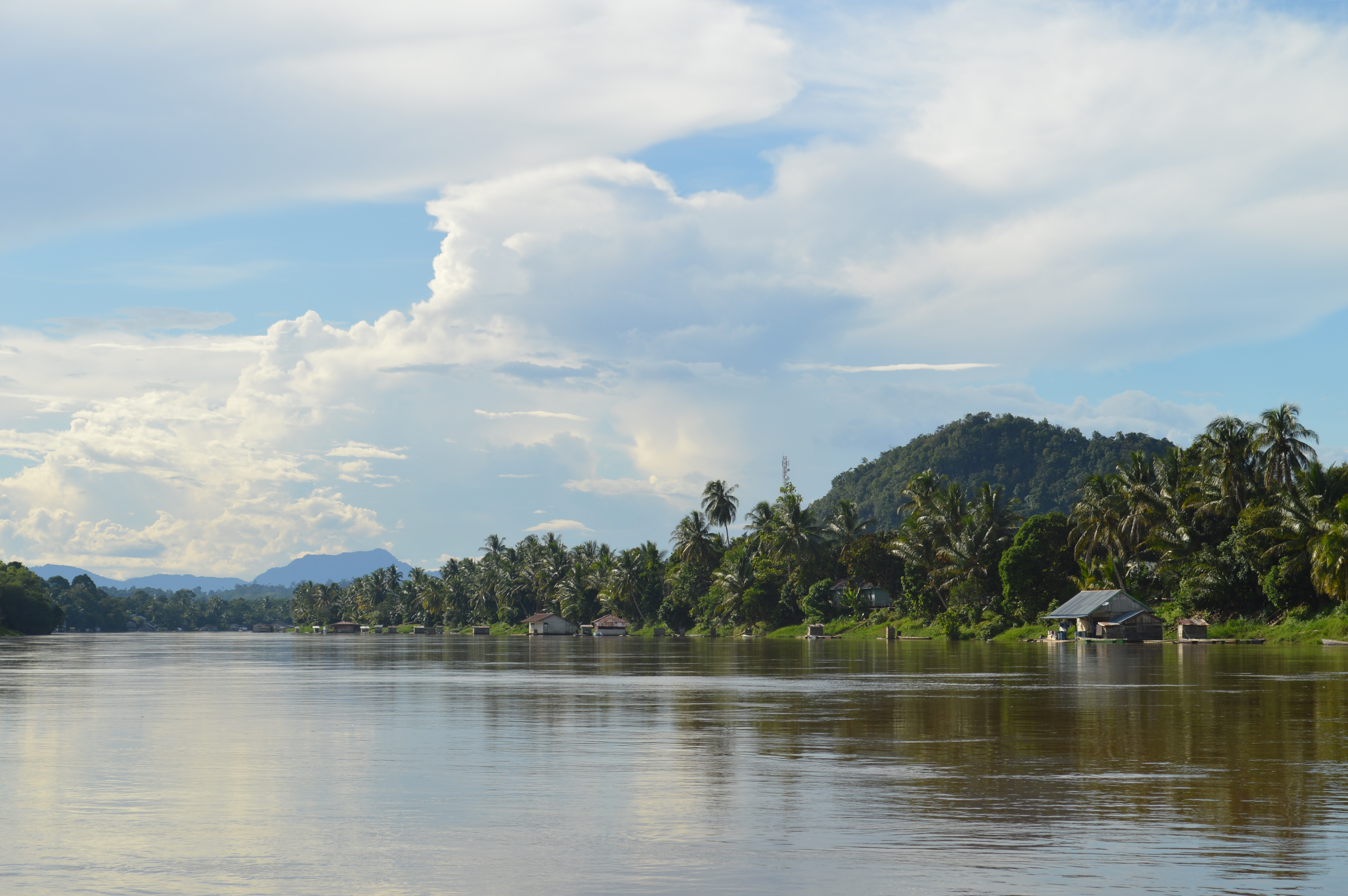

- River mouth location Belayan River (Indonesia)

Location
- Country: Indonesia

Physical characteristics
- Source
  - location: East Kalimantan
  - coordinates: 1°21′32.8068″N 116°3′18.1332″E
  - elevation: 1,370 m (4,490 ft)
- Mouth
  - location: Mahakam River
  - coordinates: 0°13′5.7648″S 116°35′57.696″E
  - elevation: 4 m (13 ft)
- Length: 319 km (198 mi)
- Basin size: 9,977.29 km^{2} (3,852.25 mi^{2})
- Width
  - average: 120 m (390 ft) (Kenohan, Kutai Kartanegara Regency)
- Depth
  - maximum: 16 m (52 ft) (Kenohan, Kutai Kartanegara Regency)
- Discharge
  - location: Liang, Kutai Kartanegara Regency (near mouth)
  - average: (Period: 1996–2005)556.6 m^{3}/s (19,660 cu ft/s)
- Discharge
  - location: Tabang (140 km upstream of mouth, 0°34′10.9092″N 116°1′9.0732″E; Basin size: 6,144 km^{2} (2,372 sq mi)
  - average: (Period: 1990–2008)400.143 m^{3}/s (14,130.9 cu ft/s)
  - minimum: 67.8 m^{3}/s (2,390 cu ft/s)(Year: 1994)
  - maximum: 1,503.17 m^{3}/s (53,084 cu ft/s)(Year: 2001)

Basin features
- Progression: Mahakam → Makassar Strait
- Tributaries
  - left: Palah, Pedahah
  - right: Bengen, Ritan, Senteka

The Belayan River is a river of Borneo, Indonesia, 1300 km northeast of the capital Jakarta. It is a tributary of the Mahakam River.

== Hydrology ==
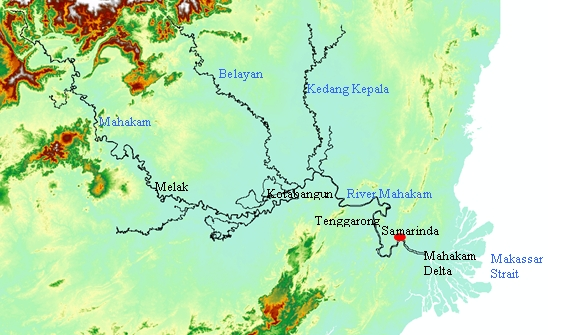
Map of Belayan, Kedang Kepala and Mahakam rivers

The river traverses three districts in the upstream area of Kutai Kartanegara Regency, namely Kenohan, Kembang Janggut, and Tabang. The high flow rate during flooding constantly eroded the land on the river banks, causing damage to the houses built next to it. Belayan flows into the Mahakam River near Muhuran, Kotabangun, and Bukit Tinjawang.

== Geography ==
Belayan River

Climate chart (precipitation, max. and min. temperature)
J	F	M	A	M	J	J	A	S	O	N	D
290 24 20	291 25 20	248 25 24	258 25 22	234 24 23	207 25 22	154 24 21	138 25 23	149 27 21	154 26 21	306 24 22	351 24 21
- █ Average max. and min. temperatures in °C
- █ Precipitation totals in mm
Imperial conversion
J	F	M	A	M	J	J	A	S	O	N	D
11 75 68	11 77 68	9.8 77 75	10 77 72	9.2 75 73	8.1 77 72	6.1 75 70	5.4 77 73	5.9 81 70	6.1 79 70	12 75 72	14 75 70
- █ Average max. and min. temperatures in °F
- █ Precipitation totals in inches

The river flows in the eastern area of Borneo island with a predominantly tropical rainforest climate (designated as Af in the Köppen-Geiger climate classification). The annual average temperature in the area is 23 °C. The warmest month is March, when the average temperature is around 24 °C, and the coldest is January, at 22 °C. The average annual rainfall is 2780 mm. The wettest month is December, with an average of 351 mm of rainfall, and the driest is August, with 138 mm of rainfall.

== Discharge ==
Average, minimum, and maximum discharge of the Belayan River at Tabang (0°34′10.9092″N 116°1′9.0732″E). The period from 1990 to 2008.

Year	Discharge (m^{3}/s)			Year	Discharge (m^{3}/s)		
Year	Min	Mean	Max	Year	Min	Mean	Max
1990	132.82	300.67	590.56	2000	350.04	540.76	790.45
1991	313.75	480.6	893.62	2001	394.12	944.69	1,503.17
1992	117.44	300.41	543.39	2002	178.53	472.19	736.78
1993	112.01	238.82	450.93	2003	156.95	288.34	467.1
1994	67.8	186.53	279.97	2004	108.71	228.57	463.38
1995	100.42	148.46	250.8	2005	234.99	389.65	635.44
1996	81.73	252.5	627.21	2006	99.83	431.14	700.15
1997	184.88	438.65	600.43	2007	218.45	428.36	637.98
1998	143.9	398.19	675.27	2008	346.84	536.21	788.89
1999	332.56	590.9	830.65		67.8	400.143	1,503.17

== Width and depth ==
Location	Belayan		Mahakam	
Location	Width (m)	Depth (m)	Width (m)	Depth (m)
Kenohan 0°10′24.3624″S 116°29′51.6516″E–0°1′40.008″N 116°26′35.3328″E	120	16		
Kembang Janggut 0°8′41.4168″N 116°22′0.408″E	180	26		
Loa Kulu 0°31′35.652″S 117°1′45.7356″E			270	28
Kota Bangun 0°13′31.9476″S 116°35′18.762″E			320	18
Muara Muntai 0°21′47.448″S 116°23′27.852″E			290	22

== Uses ==
The Belayan River is vital for the population along its banks for transportation, water source for daily life, and also for occupation for some inhabitants, such as fish and gold. The river is important for the people of three districts, Kenohan, Kembang Janggut, and Tabang, even for centuries was the only access route to those three districts. Upstream of Belayan, there are some villages of the Dayak Kenyak tribe, such as Ritan Baru, Tabang District, which can be reached in about one or two days by boat or ferry from Samarinda. It took about two days and one night to travel from Tabang to Tenggarong using river transportation. The local Dayak tribe is known for wood sculptures and other handicrafts.

Along the river, there are many ports to transport coals from the mines in Kutai Kartanegara for export.

Due to sedimentation, the Belayan River needs to be dredged regularly, so that it flows steadily downstream and doesn't cause much flooding.

== Ecology ==
The Belayan River is a habitat of the Mahakam or Irrawaddy dolphin (Orcaella brevirostris), one of the river animals in the IUCN Red List of Threatened Species, and also of little egret (Egretta garzetta).

== See also ==
- List of drainage basins of Indonesia
- List of rivers of Indonesia
- List of rivers of Kalimantan
