= Barataria Bay =

Bay in Louisiana, United States

Coordinates: 29.37411°N 89.93813°W

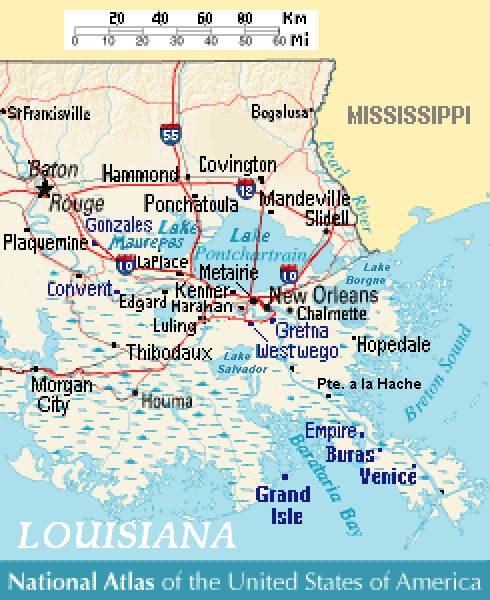
Barataria Bay [lower right] is a bay of the Gulf of Mexico that is located between Empire and Grand Isle, Louisiana [enlarge].

Barataria Bay (French: Baie de Barataria), also Barrataria Bay, is a bay of the Gulf of Mexico, about 15 miles (24 km) long and 12 miles (19 km) wide, in southeastern Louisiana, in Jefferson Parish and Plaquemines Parish, United States. It is separated from the gulf by two barrier islands, Grand Isle and Grand Terre.

The bay takes its name from the Spanish novel Don Quixote, in which the insula Barataria, or Barataria island, appears as a fictional territory governed by Sancho Panza.

== Geography ==
The bay is indented and marshy, with many islands. The surrounding low-lying Barataria country, south of New Orleans and west of the Mississippi River Delta, is noted for its shrimp industry (based at villages built on pilings above the coastal marshes), muskrat trapping, natural gas wells, oil wells, and sulfur production. Its inlet is connected to the Gulf Intracoastal Waterway system.

== History and economy ==
Barataria Bay was used in the early 19th century as the base of pirates, privateers, and smugglers led by the pirate Jean Lafitte. They were referred to as the Baratarians.

Today the bay is a notable source of shrimp and sulfur, as well as of muskrat fur, natural gas, and petroleum.

Until Hurricane Betsy made landfall in 1965, Barataria Bay was home to Manila Village.

Barataria Bay along with Biloxi Marsh, Pointe-au-Chien and Adam’s Bay since 2014 have been part of an oyster shell recycling program to build reefs and protect against erosion and create marine habitats.

== 2010 oil spill ==
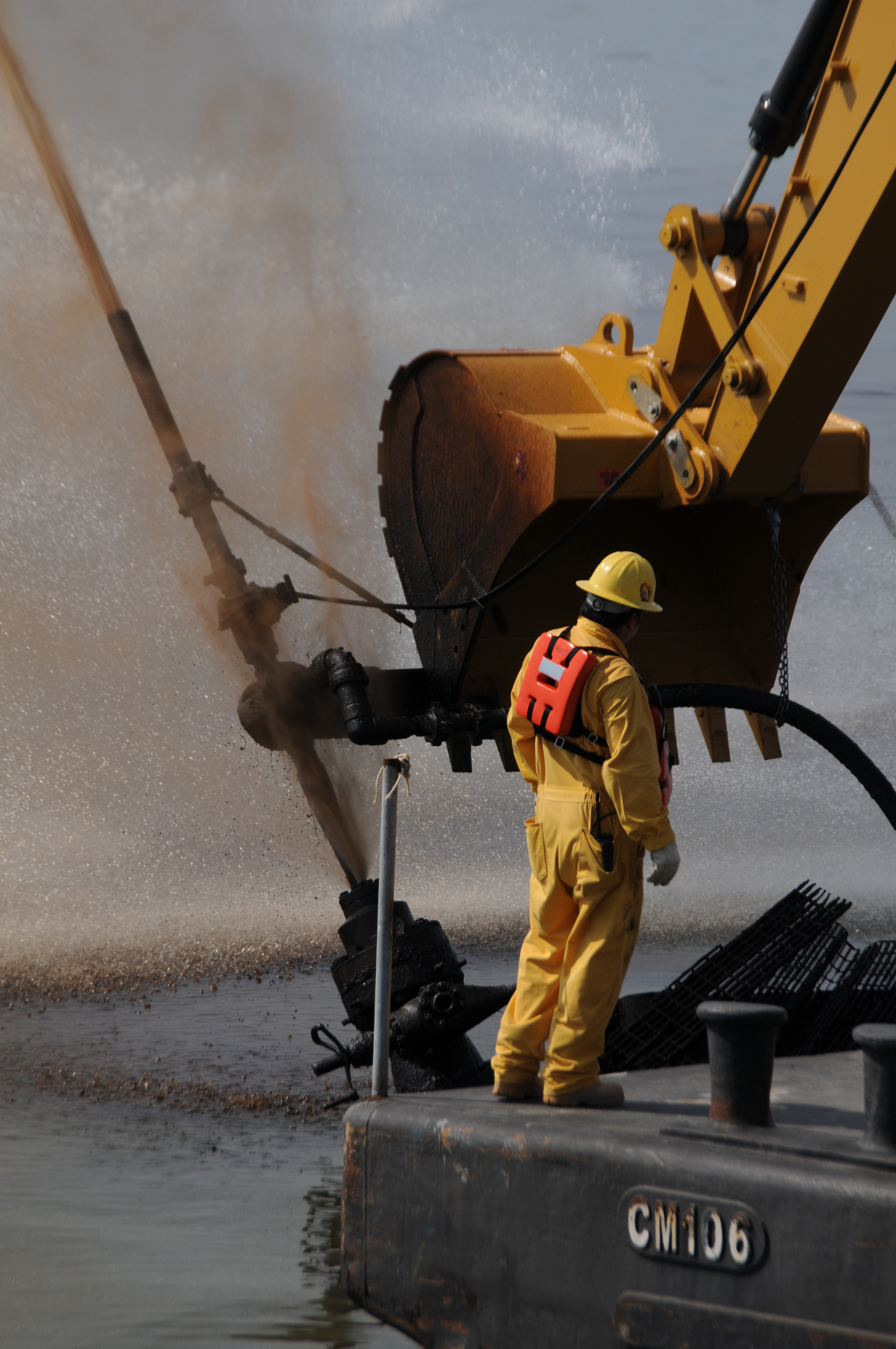
Crews work to control the damaged wellhead spewing oil into the waters of Barataria Bay.

On 27 July 2010, the tugboat Pere Ana C. struck an abandoned wellhead owned by Houston-based Cedyco Corp, while pulling a barge near Bayou St. Denis in Barataria Bay, causing a 20-to-100-foot (6.1 to 30.5 m) oil and gas geyser.

The geyser was brought under control and the wellhead was repaired and capped on 1 August 2010, five days after the collision.

== See also ==
- Barataria, a census-designated place
- Mid-Barataria Sediment Diversion, a project to restore sediment flows
- Jean Lafitte National Historical Park and Preserve - Barataria Preserve
- List of oil spills
- USS Barataria
- USCGC Barataria
