= Integrated mangrove-shrimp aquaculture =

Sustainable farming system

Integrated mangrove-shrimp (IMS) aquaculture is a sustainable farming system used as one of the measures for mangrove rehabilitation and can be described as a method of organic aquaculture. Silvoaquaculture or silvofisheries are also terms used to define this farming practice where mangrove trees are planted alongside shrimp ponds allowing for profitable net income from shrimp farming, as it replicates a more natural habitat.

One of the main causes of mangrove forest depletion is the expansion of shrimp aquaculture. Coastal regions of Southeast Asia have suffered considerable loss as their shrimp production grew to dominate the market over the past 50 years. The performance and sustainability of shrimp ponds depend on the goods and services provided by mangrove ecosystems yet mangrove forests are being cleared to build these shrimp farms. For this reason, IMS farming is an alternative practice that can meet mangrove conservation needs, while sustaining the livelihoods of coastal communities.

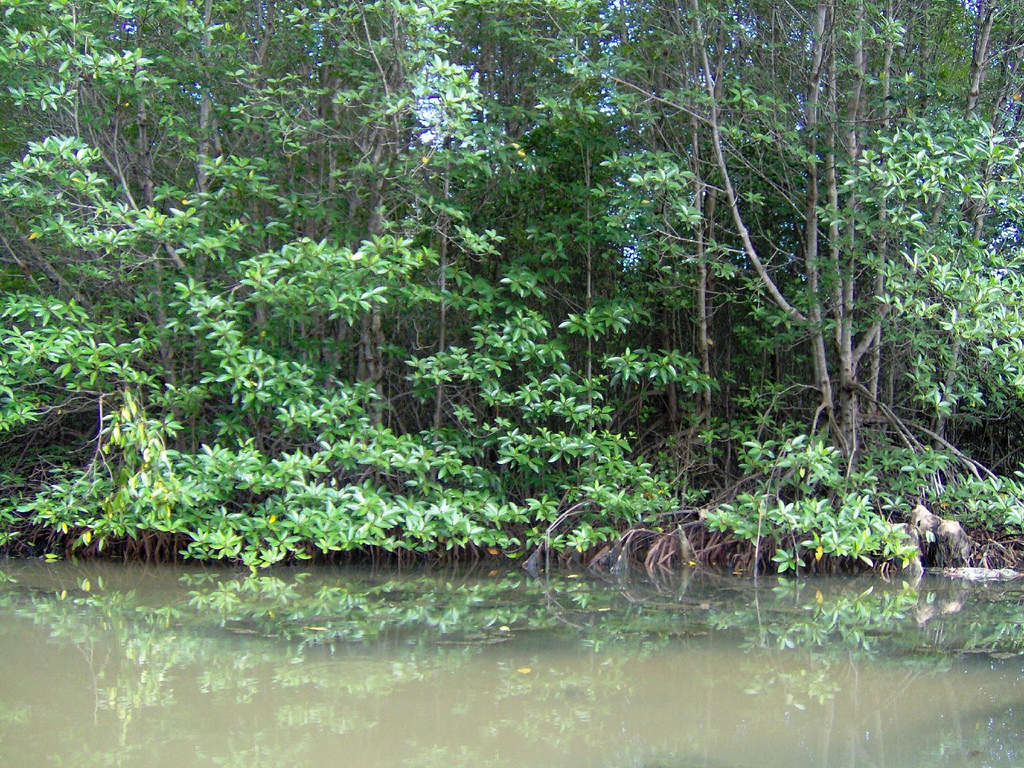
Mangrove forest in the Can Gio Biosphere Reserve in Vietnam.

== History ==
It is believed that silvofishery has its origins in Myanmar in the 1950s. The government developed a system that required farmers to plant trees in exchange for using land, which in turn allowed for reforestation at low operational costs. Indonesia and Vietnam are known to have used silvofishery since 1978 and this farming system has also been introduced in other Southeast Asian regions as well as in countries of South Asia and South America.

== The integrated mangrove-shrimp system ==
=== The design ===
In IMS systems, mangrove vegetation can be planted in three different ways:

- On platforms or bunds creating rows of trees in between water canals or ditches where the shrimps are raised
- On one large platform surrounded by a large area of water
- In one area that is separated from the shrimp ponds by dykes

These three types of design are defined as integrated, associated and separated, respectively.

=== Ideal conditions ===
Based on multiple studies on IMS cultivation in Vietnam, the optimal mangrove coverage to maximize net profit from shrimp production was found to be between 30%-50%. The challenge in these cases are due to the regulations stipulating that mangrove coverage need to be above optimal percentages, between 60-80%, which has led to over logging and the reluctance to practice silvoaquaculture.

Other factors that can affect the production of shrimps in silvoaquaculture are the following:

- Pond management: pond depth and pond mud pH can affect water quality
- Recruitment of wild shrimps: IMS cultivation depends on the natural recruitment of wild shrimps, which varies with season
- Leaf litter: decomposition of leaf litter can affect water quality and enhance the chances of disease
- Water exchange: proper water exchange to reduce leaf litter decomposition and sedimentation requires good system design, with proper inlet and outlet
- Predators: aquatic predators can enter the pond during water exchange and reduce the survival of post-larvae shrimps

=== The comparison with traditional farming practice ===
Traditionally, shrimp farming ranges from intensive to extensive systems. IMS aquaculture is similar to extensive farming in that it doesn't depend on chemical inputs, formulated feed and shrimp larvae but instead relies on natural feed and natural shrimp recruitment from the exchange of tidal water. Silvoaquaculture, is a manageable alternative for small-scale farmers who lack access to financial support. Unlike intensive farming, where shrimp yield correlates with high investment, this sustainable practice has a low operational cost. Furthermore, IMS cultivation allows for shrimp harvest on a continuous basis, whereas in intensive farming shrimps are harvested once per crop cycle.

=== Organic aquaculture ===
IMS cultivation can be converted to organic aquaculture by following regulations stipulated by Naturland, an international associations of farmers promoting organic agriculture. The area formerly occupied by mangroves can't exceed 50% of the total farm area and shrimp products can only be labeled as organic once the former mangrove area is at least 50% restored within a 5-year period. Organic shrimp farming has many advantages such as the rehabilitation of mangrove forests, the reduction of production costs and the higher market price for organic shrimps. However, the certification process for access to global markets is costly, thus can be a deterrent for farmers.

== Benefits and challenges ==
IMS farming is not yet common practice; it has many advantages compared with traditional shrimp farming systems, but it is not without its roadblocks.

Below are some of the main benefits and challenges of silvoaquaculture:

=== Benefits ===
- Biodiversity of flora and fauna: the increase in mangrove area helps maintain biodiversity as mangroves provide nursing grounds for a number of aquatic species and are home to numerous animal species.
- Blue carbon sequestration: the restoration of mangrove forests by practicing IMS aquaculture can help reduce greenhouse gas emissions as these trees are highly efficient in capturing and storing carbon.
- Low investment: IMS farming benefits from the natural functions of the mangrove ecosystem, thus is not reliant on external inputs (e.g. feeds, larvae stocks and chemical inputs), which represent higher financial costs.
- Protection of coastlines: the presence of mangrove trees protects coastal regions from soil erosion and reduces their vulnerability to negative impacts of climate change and natural disasters.
- Sustainable livelihood: IMS cultivation provides local communities with regular income from shrimp farming (continuous harvest) as well as from timber production and other fishery products, while rehabilitating mangrove forests.
- Water quality: the presence of mangrove trees can improve the water quality of shrimp ponds, which can limit disease outbreak as they have bio-filtering functions and they buffer against water temperature shock (tree shading).

=== Challenges ===
- Benefit sharing from timber production: farmers can be discouraged from shifting to IMS farming because the income from mangrove forest exploitation may not be as profitable for them due to unequal benefit sharing with forest companies or relevant stakeholders in the timber industry.
- Ideal conditions: the design and maintenance of a mixed mangrove-shrimp environment (e.g. tree coverage, leaf litter, ditch area) to maximize shrimp yield can be challenging and discouraging if farmers don't have access to enough resources (labor and financial) or to adequate technical knowledge
- Policy conflict and enforcement: contradictory policies stipulated by different levels of government or different governmental departments as well as the poor enforcement of these policies due to the lack of resources can lead to over logging or to the illegal conversion of mangrove areas to shrimp ponds.

== Recommendations ==
Below are some of the main recommendations for the use of IMS cultivation as a sustainable farming practice in mangroves:

- The provision of financial incentives for practicing IMS aquaculture and for the participation in the mangrove restoration plan.
- The provision of financial and technical support from international institutions.
- The participation of local communities in mangrove restoration and management planning.
- The collaboration of key stakeholders (e.g. government, NGOs, coastal communities, international agencies) in the implementation of IMS aquaculture.
