= Recolonization =

Recolonization is a process in which former or new colonizing powers retain influence over former colonies in respects which effectively replicate or reproduce the conditions for the former colony which existed under direct colonialism, especially in instances in which the former colony is now an independent nation state. Recolonization inherently references the failure or incomplete nature of decolonization and is often used to reference the conditions of former colonies in the Global South, many of which are now officially independent and sovereign nations yet are still subjugated to former colonial powers in the Global North by global capitalism, which maintains continued resource extraction and military control (e.g. counter-revolutionary forces and regime changes) in former colonies with the explicit purpose of serving and benefiting the interests of the former or new colonizing powers. The term has been compared to neocolonialism, although has been distinguished as a more powerful metaphor regarding the continued influence of colonial powers over former colonies.

== Usage of term ==
In the 1990s, African writers Ali Mazrui and Archie Mafeje held an intense debate regarding the usage of the term recolonization following Mazrui's publication of a newspaper article entitled "Recolonization or Self-colonization? Decaying Parts of Africa Need Benign Colonization" in the Los Angeles Times and the International Herald Tribune, which was translated into various languages. In the article, Mazrui argues that "surely it is time for Africans to exert more pressure on each other, including through benevolent intervention, to achieve a kind of Pax Africana based on regional intervention or unification of smaller states," further stating that some countries may need to be temporarily controlled by others and "submit to trusteeship and even tutelage for awhile," citing the case of Zanzibar's annexation by Tanganyika in 1964. Mazrui proposed an African Security Council which would "oversee the continent" and coordinate with the United Nations, concluding that "if Africa does not follow this path, the lack of stability and economic growth will push the entire continent further into the desperate margins of global society" and reflecting that "self-colonization if we can manage it, is better than colonization by outsiders."

Mazrui was accused by Mafeje of being an "unconscious agent of Western racism" who used the terms recolonization and colonization in a manner which was "intellectually bankrupt" and "analytically superficial." Mafeje asserted that Mazrui was "acutely aware of the racist and imperialist connotation of the term and for this reason he tries to dispense with the white man's burden (a crude cliché)" and deconstructs his arguments for a trusteeship system, citing how this same imperialist system eliminated Patrice Lumumba. He refers to Mazrui's assertions that some more stable or powerful African states may need to oversee or "recolonize" more dysfunctional African states as outright absurd. Mafeje concludes his critique of Mazrui's article by claiming that "every political scientist in Africa knows that Ali Mazrui's prescription is in fact contrary to popular sentiments on this continent" and "far from needing recolonization, we need decolonization in Africa not only of the body polity but also of the mind."

Mazrui's article notably prompted confusion in Egypt, Somalia, and elsewhere, as Kassem-Ali notes that Mazrui's arguments may have been misinterpreted by some due to language employed in the Arabic translation of the article. Jaafar Kassem-Ali argues that Mazrui's article was "dreaming of an early Pax Africana" rather than inviting the preceding system of colonization back to Africa.

Benevolent recolonization occurs when the colonized benefit far more from the new relationship than the colonizer. Kassem-Ali cites the case of the recolonization of Zanzibar by Tanganyika during the mid-1960s, in which the people of Zanzibar arguably received greater political power in the United Republic of Tanzania, which included a guaranteed Vice-Presidency in the Union. This has been cited as an instance of "recolonization", however, because "the people of Zanzibar were never consulted whether they wanted to give up their sovereignty after independence."

Benign recolonization occurs when the benefits between the colonizer and the colonized parallel one another and the moral case is also in relative equilibrium. Kassem-Ali references how Tanzania's brief occupation of Uganda in 1979 which deposed of Idi Amin and reinstated the leadership of Milton Obote was a case of benign recolonization, in which Tanzania gained "a more responsive government" in Kampala and Uganda gained via the end of the tyranny instated under Amin.

Malignant recolonization occurs when the colonizer benefits far more from the new colonial relationship than the colonized. Kassem-Ali cites the case of Ethiopia's decision to annex Eritrea under the leadership of Emperor Haile Selassie following the end of Italian colonial rule without granting Eritrea any regional autonomy, which resulted in a thirty-year civil war from 1962 to 1992. Another case exists in which Morocco attempted to forcibly incorporate Western Sahara through "manipulating a referendum or threatening armed action," which prompted action from the United Nations to prevent Sahrawi annexation without self-determination.

In his analysis of both benevolent and benign recolonization, Kassem-Ali lists the term in quotes ("recolonization"), whereas in his discussion of malignant recolonization the term is left as is, indicating that the term recolonization more aptly applies in the latter scenario.
