= Borneo =

Island in Southeast Asia

Native name: Pulau Borneo (Malay) Pulau Kalimantan (Indonesian)
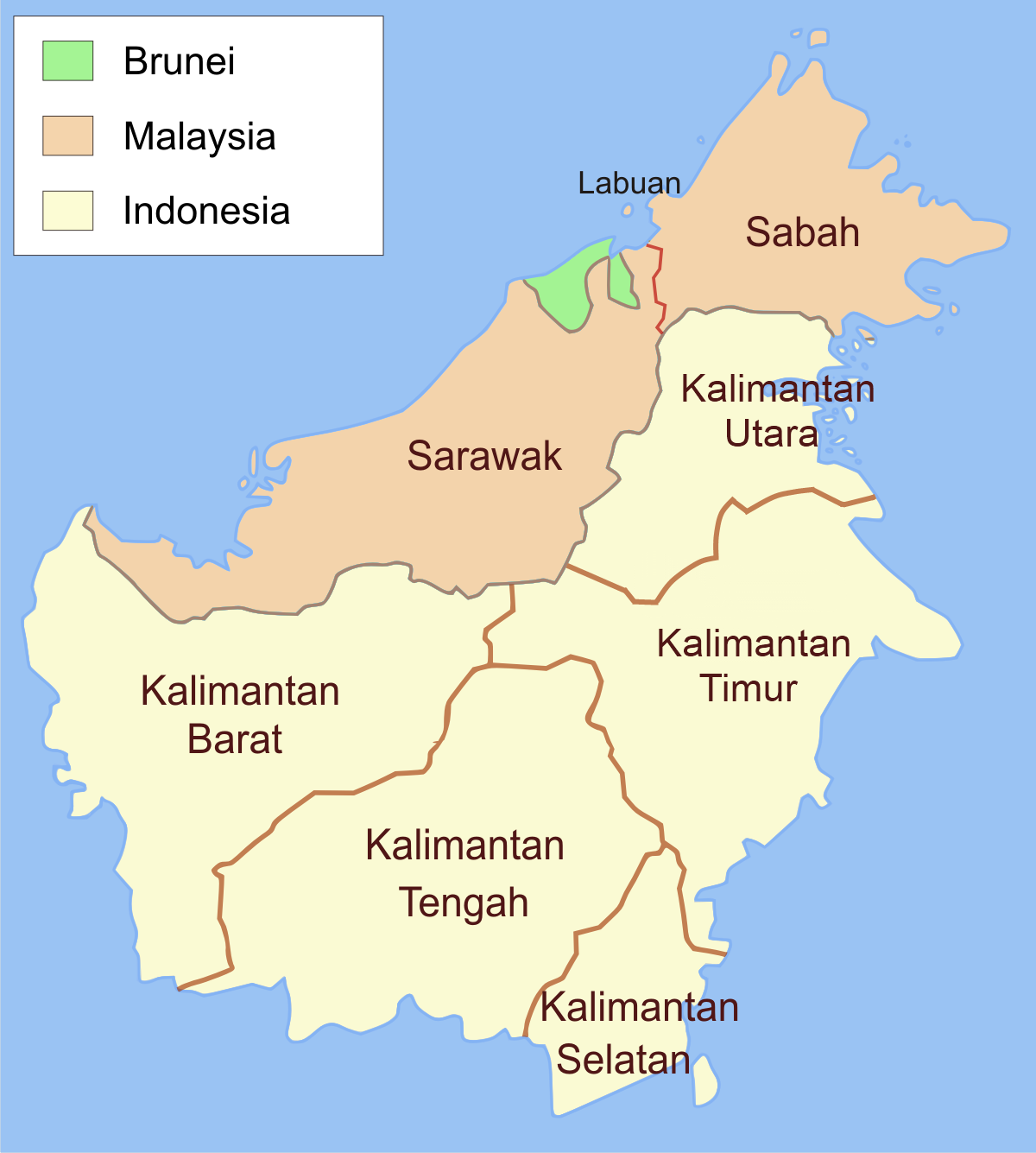
- Map of Borneo, with the three nations shown

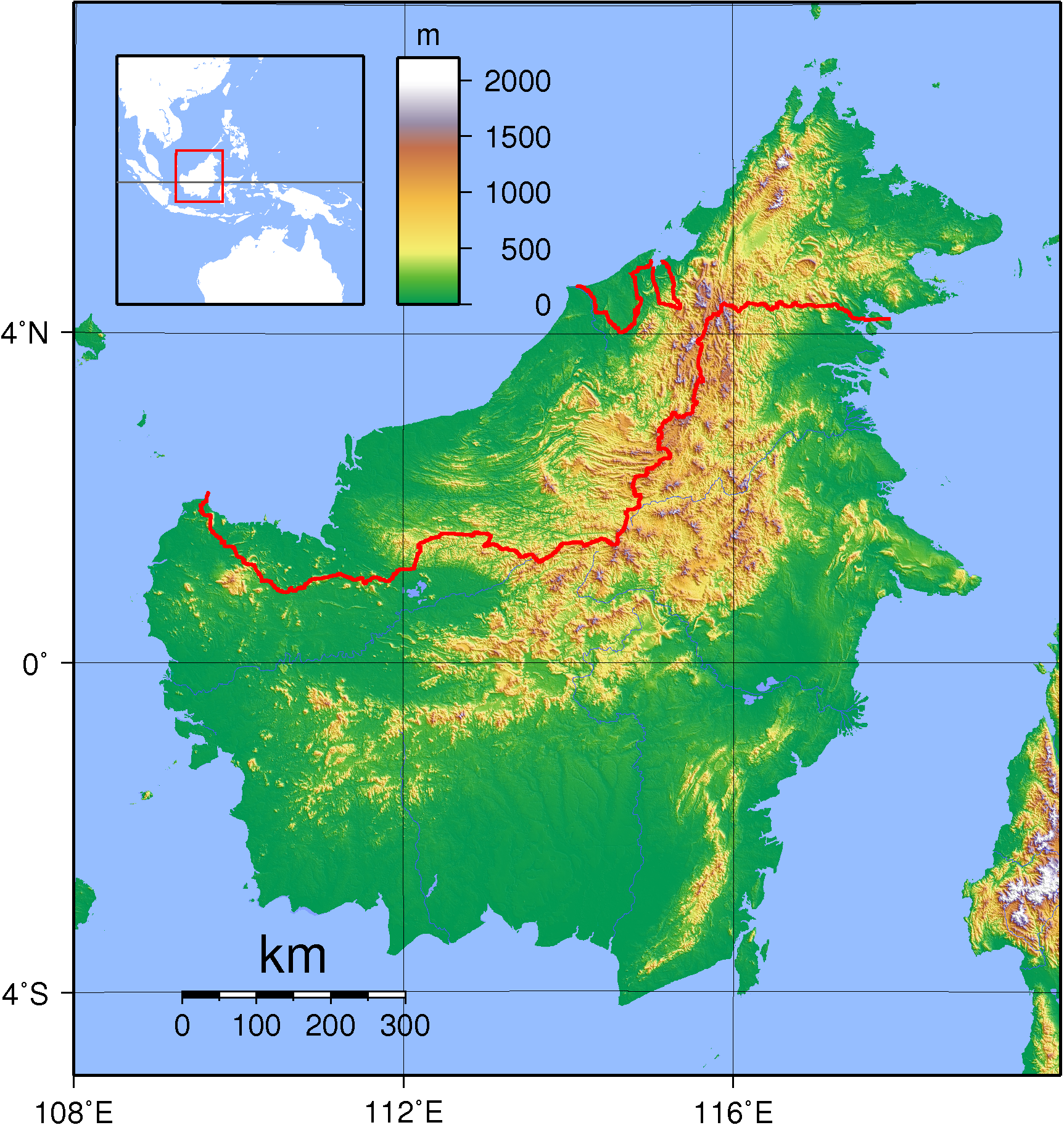
- Topography of Borneo, with red lines demarcating the three nations on it

Geography
- Location: Southeast Asia
- Coordinates: 0°N 114°E
- Archipelago: Indonesian Archipelago Greater Sunda Islands
- Area: 748,168 km^{2} (288,869 sq mi)
- Area rank: 3rd
- Highest elevation: 13,435 ft (4095 m)
- Highest point: Mount Kinabalu

Administration
- Brunei
- Districts: Belait; Brunei and Muara; Temburong; Tutong
- Largest settlement: Bandar Seri Begawan (pop. 332,700) (2025)
- Indonesia
- Provinces: West Kalimantan; Central Kalimantan; South Kalimantan; East Kalimantan; North Kalimantan
- Largest settlement: Samarinda (pop. 842,691)
- Malaysia
- States and FT: Sabah; Sarawak; Labuan
- Largest settlement: Kota Kinabalu (pop. 500,421)

Demographics
- Population: 21,258,000 (2023 Censuses) (2023)
- Population rank: 10th
- Pop. density: 28.4/km^{2} (73.6/sq mi)
- Languages: Primarily Malay, Brunei Malay and Indonesian; Also Mandarin and other Chinese languages, Javanese, Madurese, Bugis, Iban, Banjar, Ngaju, Malayic Dayak; Many indigenous languages with small numbers of speakers (Greater North Borneo, Barito and Tamanic families)
- Ethnic groups: Dayak; Kadazan; Dusun; Rungus; Murut; Sama-Bajau; Lundayeh; Paitan; Banjar; Bisaya; Iban; Melanau; Kedayan; Malays; Javanese; Bugis; Madurese; Chinese

Additional information
- Time zones: Western Indonesian Time (UTC+7); Brunei Darussalam Standard Time, Central Indonesian Time, Malaysian Standard Time (UTC+8)

Borneo (/ˈbɔːrnioʊ/) is the third-largest island in the world, with an area of 748,168 km^{2} (288,869 sq mi), and population of 23,053,723 (2020 national censuses). Situated at the geographic centre of Maritime Southeast Asia, it is one of the Greater Sunda Islands, located north of Java, west of Sulawesi, and east of Sumatra. The island is crossed by the equator, which divides it roughly in half. In Indonesia, the island is also known as Kalimantan, which is also the name of the Indonesian region located on the island. The rest of the island consists of East Malaysia and Brunei.

The geology of Borneo was formed beginning in the Mesozoic. It formed part of Sundaland, a region connected to mainland Asia, until it became isolated by sea level rise at the end of the Last Glacial Period. With seven unique ecoregions, including large expanses of some of the oldest tropical rainforests in the world, Borneo is rich in biodiversity and endemic species.

Archaeological evidence indicates that Borneo has been inhabited by humans for tens of thousands of years. The island is home to hundreds of Indigenous communities, cultures and languages, many of which have traditionally been grouped under the broad term "Dayak". Trading settlements on Borneo were connected to regional maritime networks by the first millennium CE.

Several empires, kingdoms and sultanates subsequently emerged around the island's coasts. This includes the Javanese Majapahit, the Sultanate of Brunei, which held influence over much of coastal Borneo and parts of the southern Philippines at its peak in the 15th century, and the Sultanate of Sulu, which became an important maritime power in the Sulu Sea and northeastern Borneo. The island's interior, however, remained politically diverse and was largely governed by numerous Indigenous communities and local systems of authority rather than by a single state. Parts of the island were later colonised by Britain, Netherlands and Japan.

Since decolonisation, Borneo has been politically divided among three sovereign states. Approximately 73% of the island forms part of Indonesia, comprising the five provinces collectively known as Kalimantan. About 26% consists of the Malaysian states of Sabah and Sarawak, while the sovereign state of Brunei occupies a small area on the island's northwestern coast. Brunei is the only sovereign state whose principal territory lies wholly on Borneo; Indonesia and Malaysia both extend far beyond the island. The Malaysian federal territory of Labuan is situated on a small island just off the coast of Borneo.

The majority of Borneo's inhabitants reside in coastal cities. It is the site of Indonesia's planned future capital, Nusantara. Major economic sectors include oil and gas, agriculture, timber and tourism. Industrial deforestation in Indonesian and Malaysian Borneo for timber and agricultural conversion has taken place during the past century.

== Etymology ==
=== Borneo ===
The name Borneo is closely associated with Brunei Darussalam, the historic sultanate and trading polity on the island. Early European travellers and cartographers recorded variants such as Bornei, Burnei, Burneo and Borneo when referring to Brunei, and the name was subsequently applied more broadly to the island. The name may derive from the Sanskrit word váruṇa (वरुण), meaning either "water" or Varuna, the Hindu god of rain and oceans.

The term has been used as early as the late 9th century by Fan Chuo in his book on Nanzhao in the 860s. The term Bóní (勃泥) was used to describe trading colonies in the south. In 977, Chinese records use the term Bo-ni to refer to Borneo. In 1225, it was also mentioned by the Chinese official Chau Ju-Kua. In modern Chinese, the island is called 婆羅洲 (simplified Chinese: 婆罗洲; pinyin: Póluó Zhōu), the first two characters being phonetic and the third referring to a large landmass.

=== Kalimantan ===
The Javanese manuscript Nagarakretagama, written by Majapahit court poet Mpu Prapanca in 1365, mentions the island as Nusa Tanjungnagara, which means the "island of the Tanjungpura Kingdom".

When the sixteenth-century Portuguese explorer Jorge de Menezes made contact with the indigenous people of Borneo, they referred to their island as Pulu K'lemantang, and this second word became Kalimantan, the name for modern-day Borneo in the Indonesian language. The term kelamantan is used in Sarawak to refer to a group of people who consume sago in the northern part of the island.

John Crawfurd noted in his 1865 Descriptive Dictionary of the Indian Islands that "(...) Borneo has sometimes been called by the Malays Kalamantan.", which he traces back to the name of a type of mango (Mangifera), though he added that the name, meaning Isle of Mangoes, was little-known and not popular. A mango variety locally called klemantan is still widely found in rural Ketapang and surrounding areas of West Kalimantan.

Another source states that it derives from the Sanskrit word kalamanthana, meaning "burning weather", possibly to describe the island's hot and humid tropical weather. In the Indianized Malay era the name Kalamanthana was derived from the Sanskrit terms kala (time or season) and manthana (churning, kindling, or creating fire by friction), which possibly describes the hot weather.

== Geography ==
=== Geology ===
Location of Borneo in Maritime Southeast Asia.

Borneo was formed through Mesozoic accretion of microcontinental fragments, ophiolite terranes and island arc crust onto a Paleozoic continental core. At the beginning of the Cenozoic, Borneo formed a promontory of Sundaland which partly separated from Asian mainland by the proto-South China Sea. The oceanic part of the proto-South China Sea was subducted during the Paleogene period and a large accretionary complex formed along the northwestern of the island of Borneo.

In the early Miocene uplift of the accretionary complex occurred as a result of underthrusting of thinned continental crust in northwest. The uplift may have also resulted from shortening due to the counter-clockwise rotation of Borneo between 20 and 10 mega-annum (Ma) as a consequence of Australia–Southeast Asia collision. Large volumes of sediment were shed into basins, which scattered offshore to the west, north and east of Borneo as well into a Neogene basin which is currently exposed in large areas of eastern and southern Sabah.

In southeast Sabah, the Miocene to recent island arc terranes of the Sulu Archipelago extend onshore into Borneo with the older volcanic arc was the result of southeast dipping subduction while the younger volcanics are likely resulted from northwest dipping subduction the Celebes Sea.

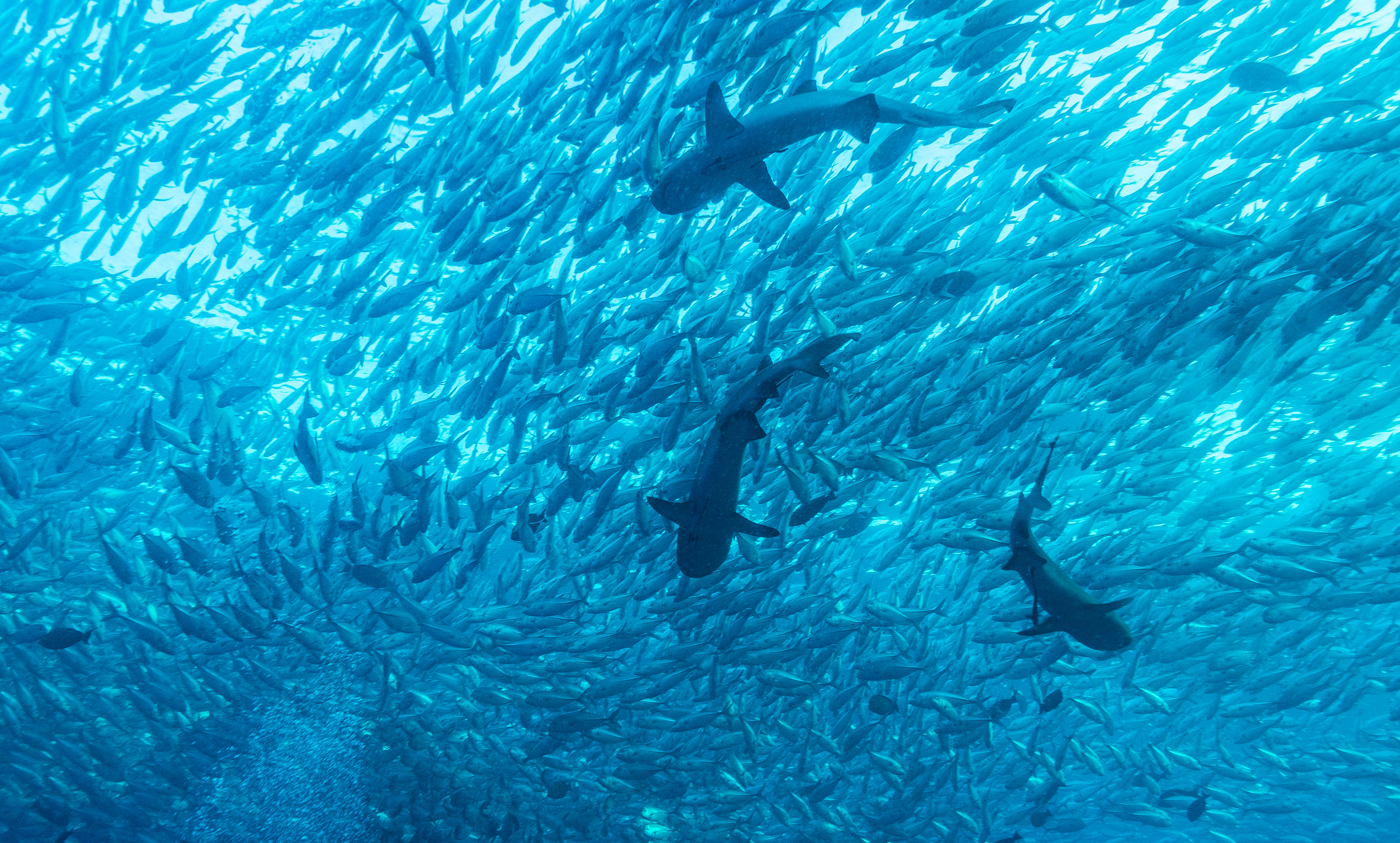
Marine life off the coast of Borneo, in the Sulu Sea

Before sea levels rose at the end of the last ice age, Borneo was part of the mainland of Asia, forming, with Java and Sumatra, the upland regions of a peninsula that extended east from present day Indochina. The South China Sea and Gulf of Thailand now submerge the former low-lying areas of the peninsula. Deeper waters separating Borneo from neighbouring Sulawesi prevented a land connection to that island, creating the divide known as Wallace's Line between Asian and Australia-New Guinea biological regions. The island today is surrounded by the South China Sea to the north and northwest, the Sulu Sea to the northeast, the Celebes Sea and the Makassar Strait to the east, and the Java Sea and Karimata Strait to the south. To the west of Borneo are the Malay Peninsula and Sumatra. To the south and east are islands of Indonesia: Java and Sulawesi, respectively. To the northeast are the Philippine Islands. With an area of 743,330 square kilometres (287,000 sq mi), it is the third-largest island in the world, and is the largest island of Asia (the largest continent). Its highest point is Mount Kinabalu in Sabah, Malaysia, with an elevation of 4,095 m (13,435 ft).

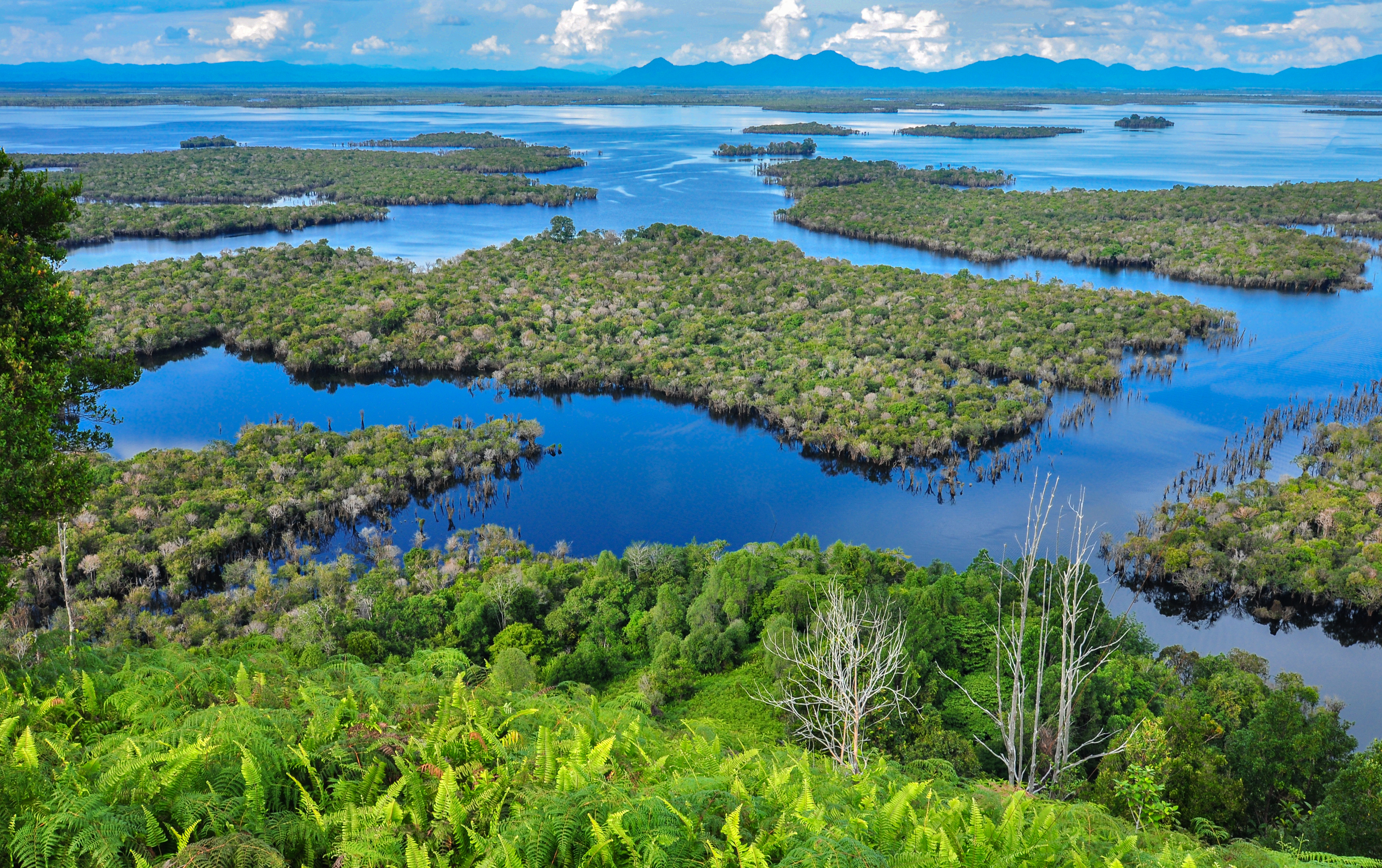
Lake Sentarum, Kapuas Hulu Regency, West Kalimantan

The largest river system is the Kapuas in West Kalimantan, with a length of 1,143 km (710 mi). Other major rivers include the Mahakam in East Kalimantan (980 km (610 mi) long), the Barito, Kahayan, and Mendawai in South Kalimantan (1,090 km (680 mi), 658 km (409 mi), and 616 km (383 mi) long respectively), Rajang in Sarawak (565 km (351 mi) long) and Kinabatangan in Sabah (560 km (350 mi) long). Borneo has significant cave systems. In Sarawak, the Clearwater Cave has one of the world's longest underground rivers while Deer Cave is home to over three million bats, with guano accumulated to over 100 metres (330 ft) deep. The Gomantong Caves in Sabah has been dubbed as the "Cockroach Cave" due to the presence of millions of cockroaches inside the cave. The Gunung Mulu National Park in Sarawak and Sangkulirang-Mangkalihat Karst in East Kalimantan which particularly a karst areas contains thousands of smaller caves.

=== Ecology ===
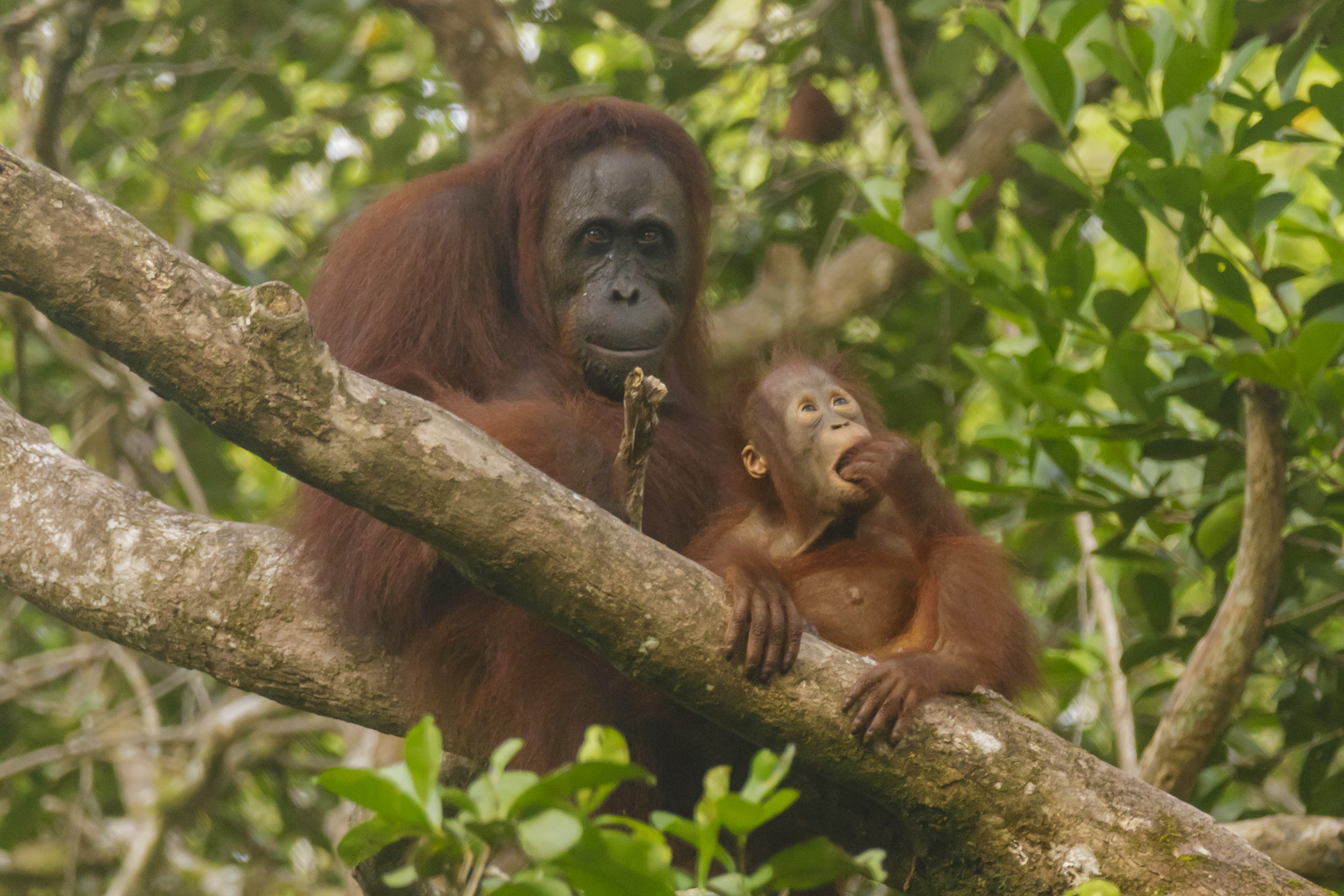
The critically endangered Bornean orangutan, a great ape endemic to Borneo

The Borneo rainforest is estimated to be around 140 million years old, making it one of the oldest rainforests in the world. The current dominant tree group, the dipterocarps, has dominated the Borneo lowland rain forests for millions of years. It is the centre of the evolution and distribution of many endemic species of plants and animals, and the rainforest is one of the few remaining natural habitats for the endangered Bornean orangutan. It is an important refuge for many endemic forest species, including the Borneo elephant, the eastern Sumatran rhinoceros, the Bornean clouded leopard, the Bornean rock frog, the hose's palm civet and the dayak fruit bat.

Borneo’s wildfire season made worse by El Niño - ESA Sentinel-3 mission image, captured on 14 October 2026,

Peat swamp forests occupy the entire coastline of Borneo. The soil of the peat swamp is comparatively infertile, while it is known to be the home of various bird species such as the hook-billed bulbul, helmeted hornbill and rhinoceros hornbill. There are about 15,000 species of flowering plants with 3,000 species of trees (267 species are dipterocarps), 221 species of terrestrial mammals and 420 species of resident birds in Borneo. There are about 440 freshwater fish species in Borneo (about the same as Sumatra and Java combined). The Borneo river shark is known only from the Kinabatangan River. In 2010, the World Wide Fund for Nature (WWF) stated that 123 species have been discovered in Borneo since the "Heart of Borneo" agreement was signed in 2007.

The WWF has classified the island into seven distinct ecoregions. Most are lowland regions:

- Borneo lowland rain forests cover most of the island, with an area of 427,500 square kilometres (165,100 sq mi).
- Borneo peat swamp forests
- Kerangas or Sundaland heath forests
- Southwest Borneo freshwater swamp forests are found in the island's western and southern lowlands
- Sunda Shelf mangroves
- The Borneo montane rain forests lie in the central highlands of the island, above the 1,000 metres (3,300 ft) elevation.
- The highest elevations of Mount Kinabalu are home to the Kinabalu montane alpine meadows, a subalpine and alpine shrubland notable for its numerous endemic species, including many orchids.

According to analysis of data from Global Forest Watch, the Indonesian portion of Borneo lost 10.7 million hectares (26 million acres) of tree cover between 2002 and 2019, of which 4 million hectares (9.9 million acres) was primary forest, compared with Malaysian Borneo's 4.4 million hectares (11 million acres) of tree cover loss and 1.9 million hectares (4.7 million acres) of primary forest cover loss. As of 2020, Indonesian Borneo accounts for 72% of the island's tree cover, Malaysian Borneo 27%, and Brunei 1%. Primary forest in Indonesia accounts for 44% of Borneo's overall tree cover.

==== Environmental issues ====
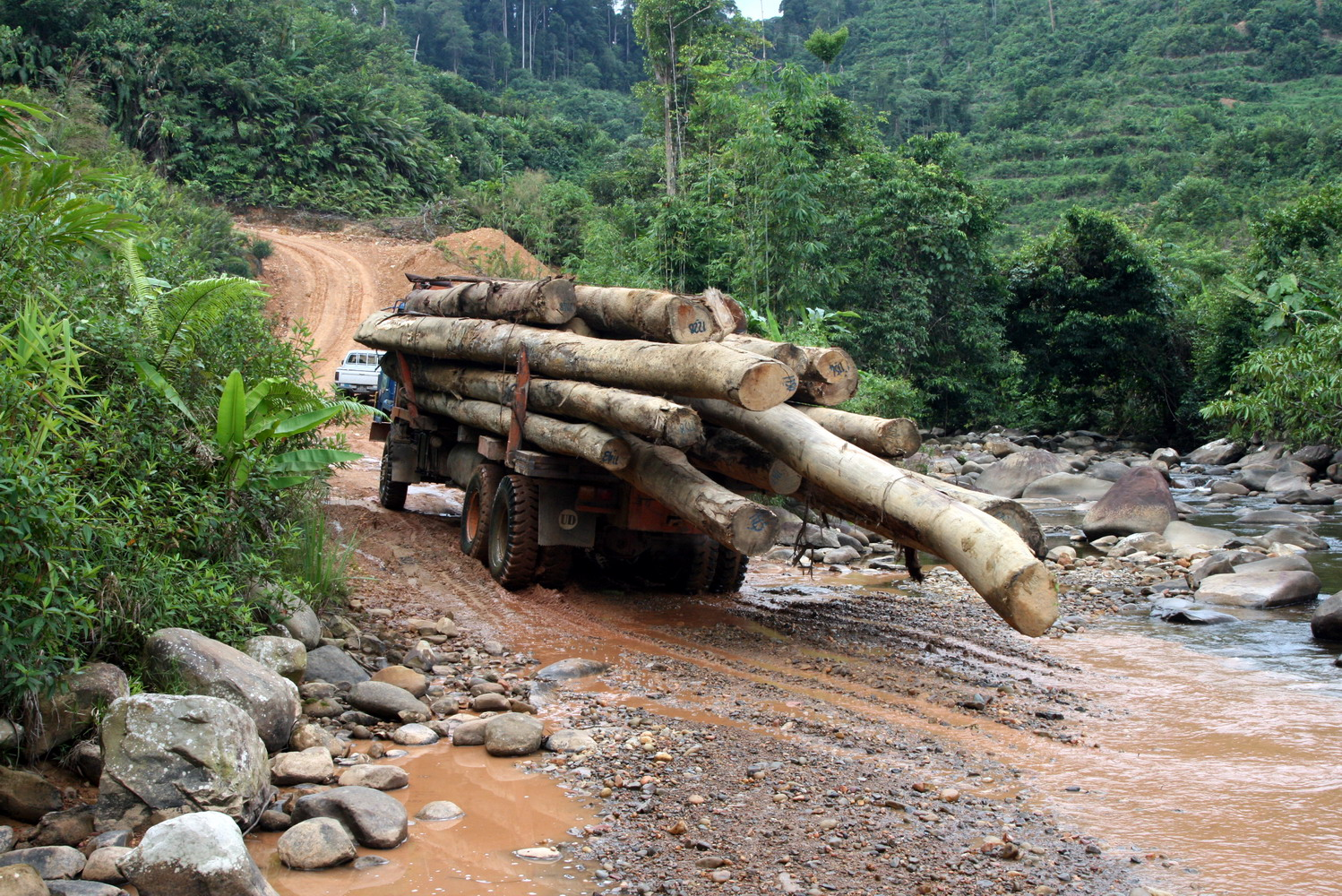
Logging near Crocker Range National Park. Borneo has lost more than half of its rainforests in the past half century.

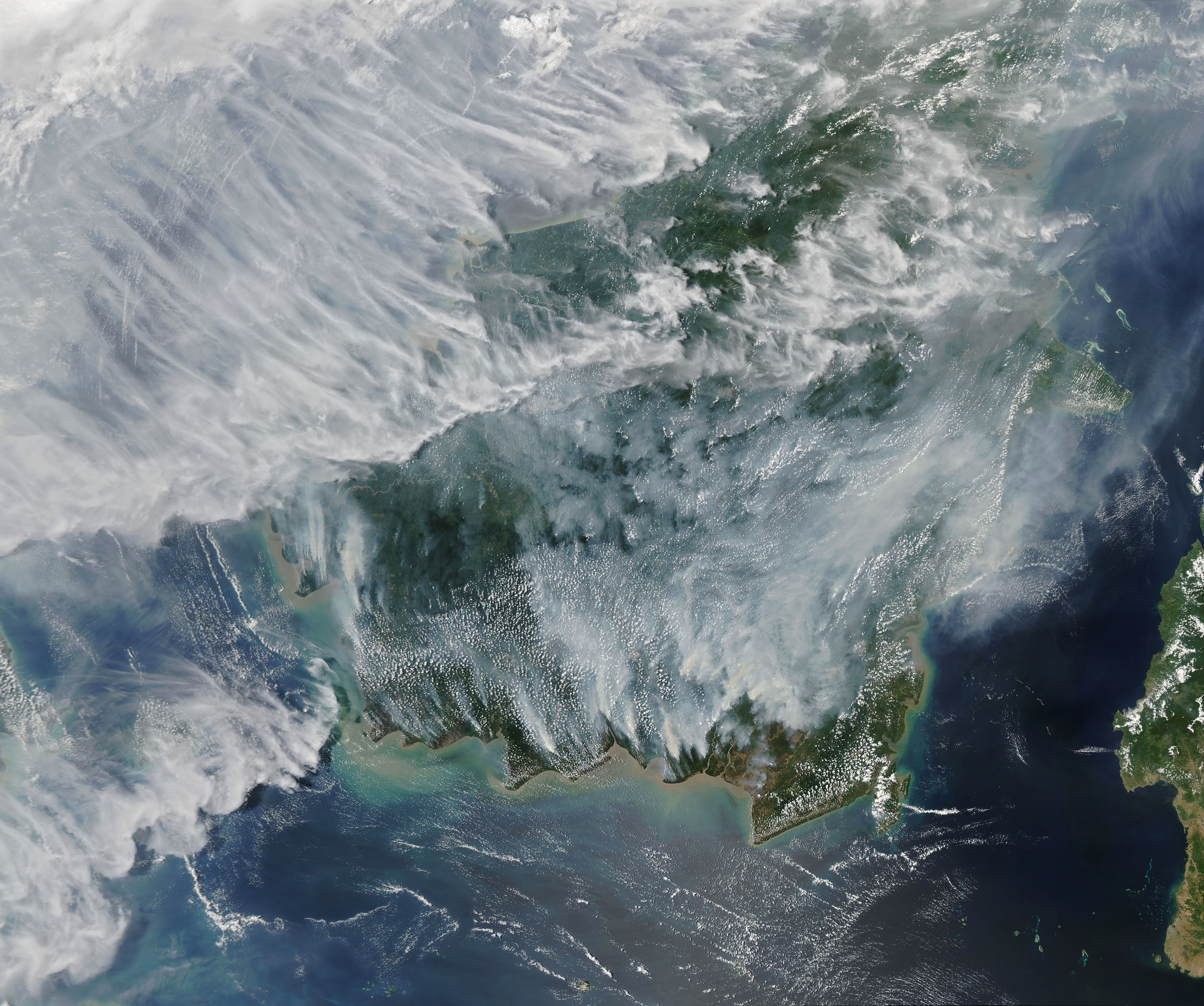
Satellite image of Borneo during the 2019 haze season.

The island historically had extensive rainforest cover, but the area was reduced due to heavy logging by the Indonesian and Malaysian wood industry, especially with the large demands of raw materials from industrial countries along with the conversion of forest lands for large-scale agricultural purposes. Half of the annual global tropical timber acquisition comes from Borneo. Palm oil plantations have been widely developed and are rapidly encroaching on the last remnants of primary rainforest. Forest fires since 1997, started to clear the forests for plantations were exacerbated by an exceptionally dry El Niño season, worsening the annual shrinkage of the rainforest. During these fires, hotspots were visible on satellite images and the resulting haze frequently affected Brunei, Indonesia and Malaysia. The haze could also reach southern Thailand, Cambodia, Vietnam and the Philippines as evidenced on the 2015 Southeast Asian haze.

A study in 2018 found that Bornean orangutans declined by 148,500 individuals from 1999 to 2015.

=== Topography ===
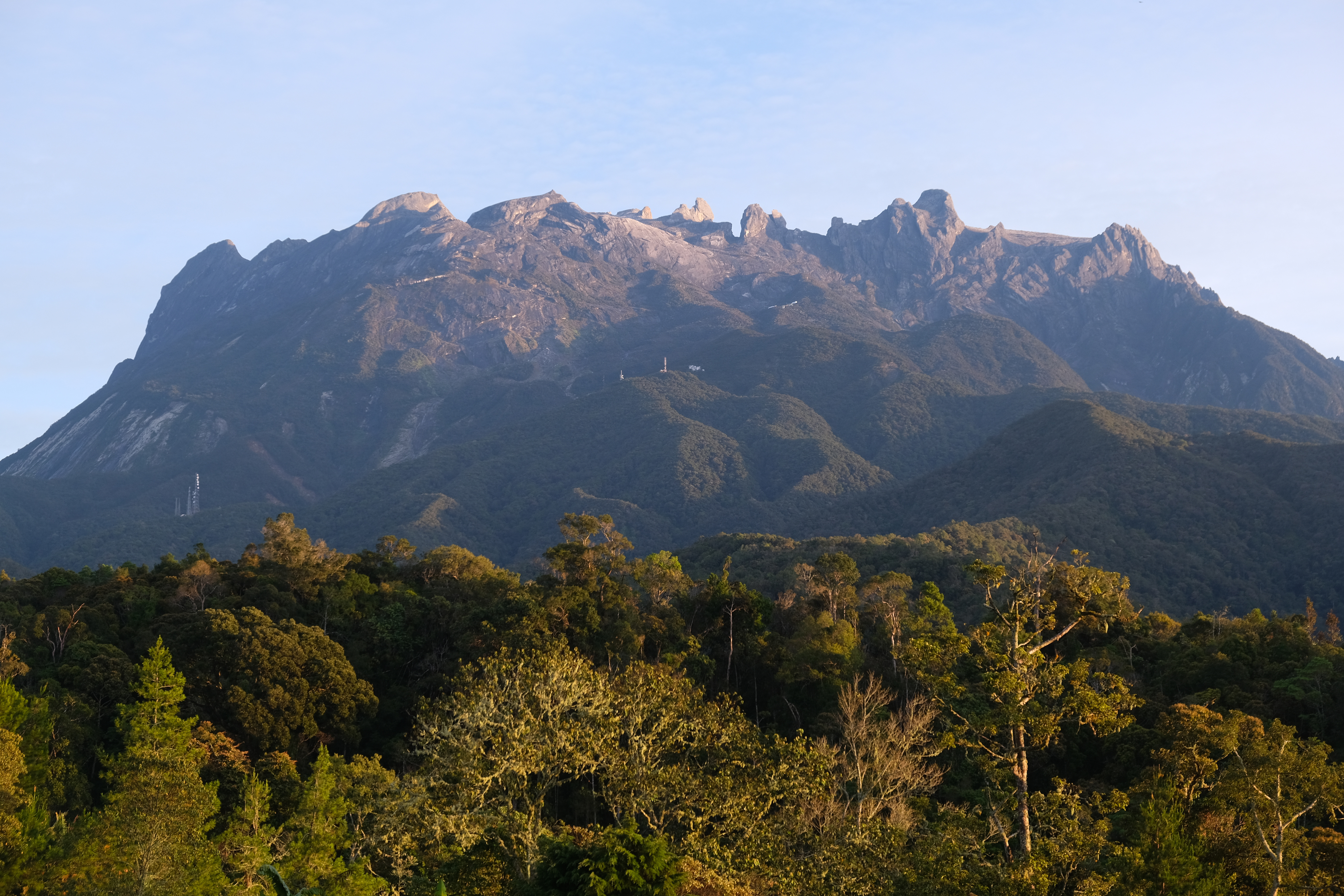
Mount Kinabalu in Malaysia, the highest summit of the island

List of highest peaks in Borneo by elevation:

- Mount Kinabalu 13,435 ft (4,095 m)
- Mount Trusmadi 8,668 ft (2,642 m)
- Raya Hill 7,474 ft (2,278 m)
- Muruk Miau 6,837 ft (2,084 m)
- Mount Wakid 6,778 ft (2,066 m)
- Monkobo Hill 5,866 ft (1,788 m)
- Mount Lotung 5,843 ft (1,781 m)
- Mount Magdalena 4,288 ft (1,307 m)
- Talibu Hill 4,144 ft (1,263 m)

=== River systems ===
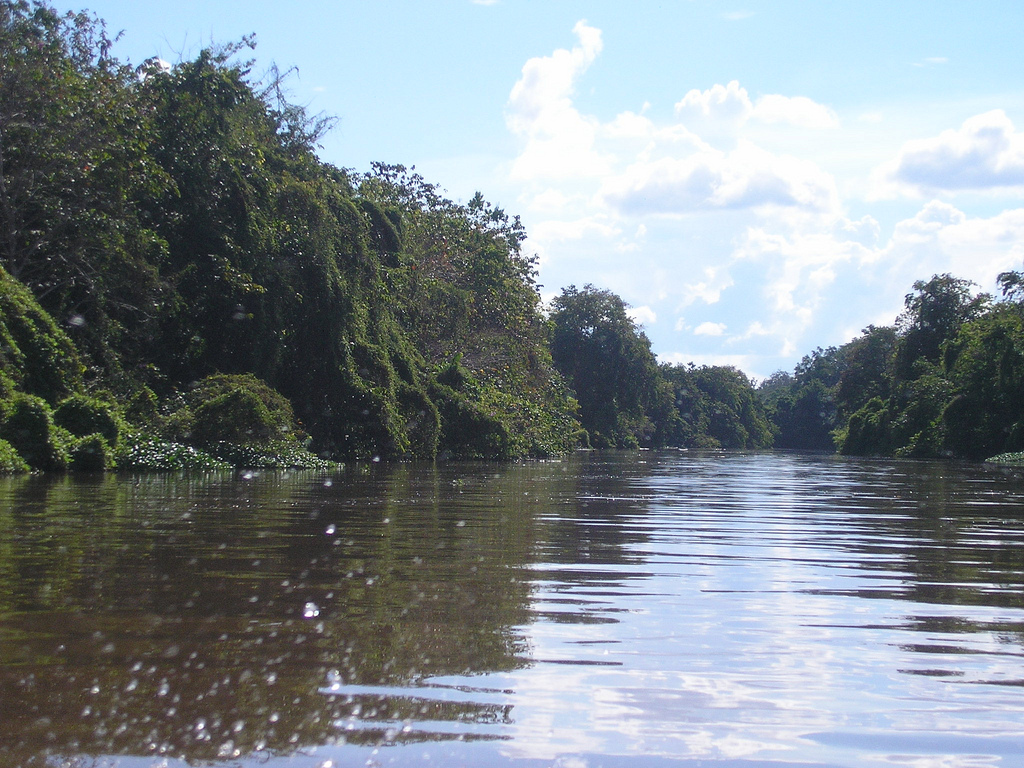
Kapuas River in Indonesia. At 1,143 km (710 mi) in length, it is the longest river in Borneo.

List of rivers in Borneo by length:

- Kapuas River 1,143 km (710 mi)
- Barito River 1,090 km (680 mi)
- Mahakam River 980 km (610 mi)
- Kahayan River 658 km (409 mi)
- Mendawai River 616 km (383 mi)
- Kayan River 576 km (358 mi)
- Rajang River 565 km (351 mi)
- Kinabatangan River 560 km (350 mi)
- Baram River 400 km (250 mi)
- Sembakung River 352 km (219 mi)
- Sesayap River 279 km (173 mi)
- Pawan River 197 km (122 mi)

== History ==
=== Early history ===
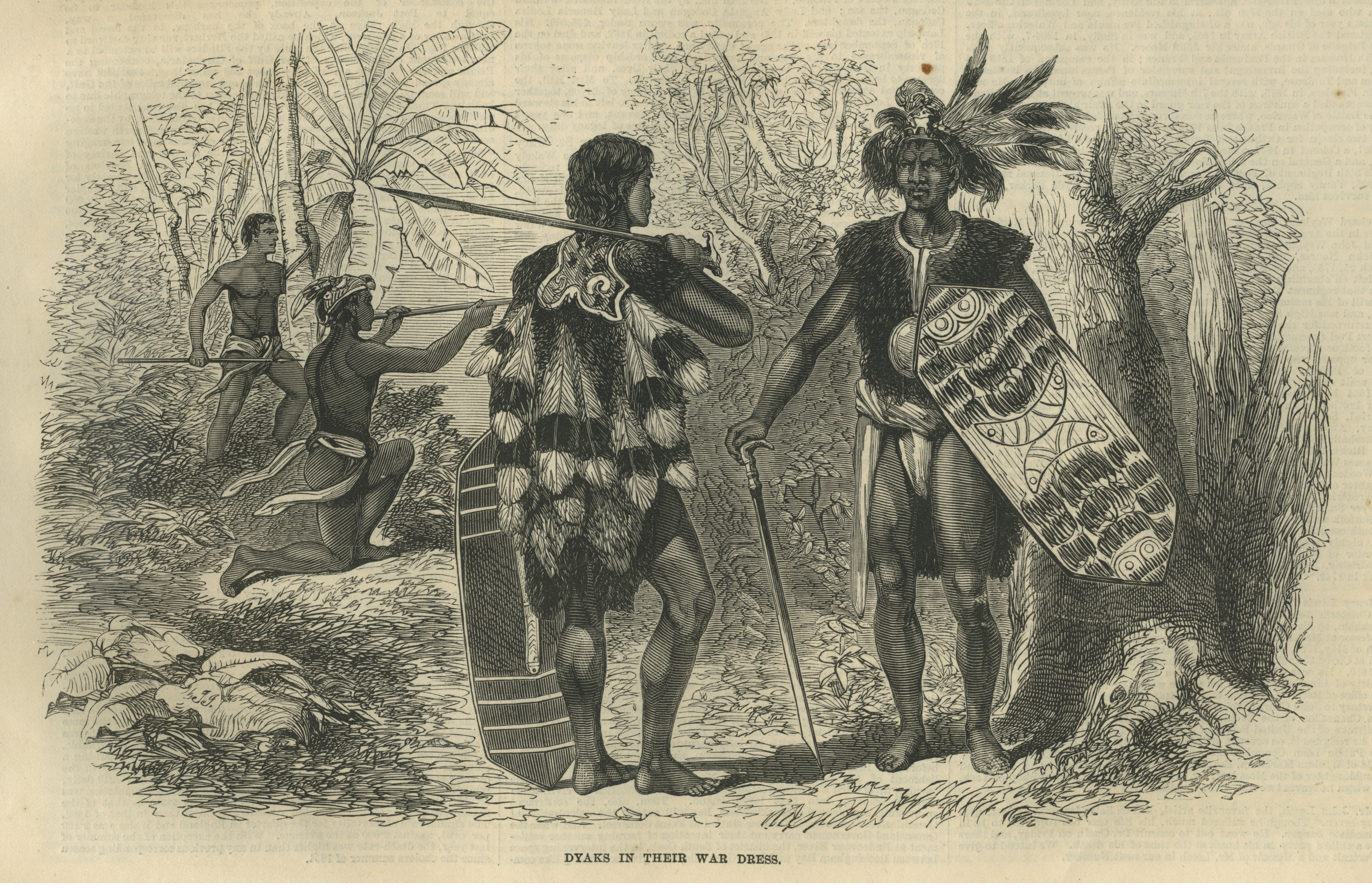
Dayaks, a collective term used to describe Indigenous people of Borneo, depicted in an 1864 illustration in The Illustrated London News.

In the Samang Buat Cave, in Lahad Datu, Sabah, archaeological evidence suggests that human settlement dates back to around 46,000 years ago, confirming Lahad Datu as one of the most important prehistoric centres in Southeast Asia. Intriguingly, tools found in Mansuli Valley, also in Lahad Datu, have been dated as early as 235,000 years ago.

In Tingkayu Valley, Kunak, Sabah, archaeological excavations revealed traces of a Palaeolithic community dating from approximately 28,000–30,000 years ago. The site, once a prehistoric lake basin, yielded Hoabinhian stone tools that indicate human activity in the area.

In Niah Cave, Sarawak, human presence has been dated to around 40,000 years ago. Recent studies in the Trader Cave section of the complex discovered microlithic tools and human remains, dated between 55,000 and 65,000 years ago, making it one of the most important early modern human sites in Southeast Asia.

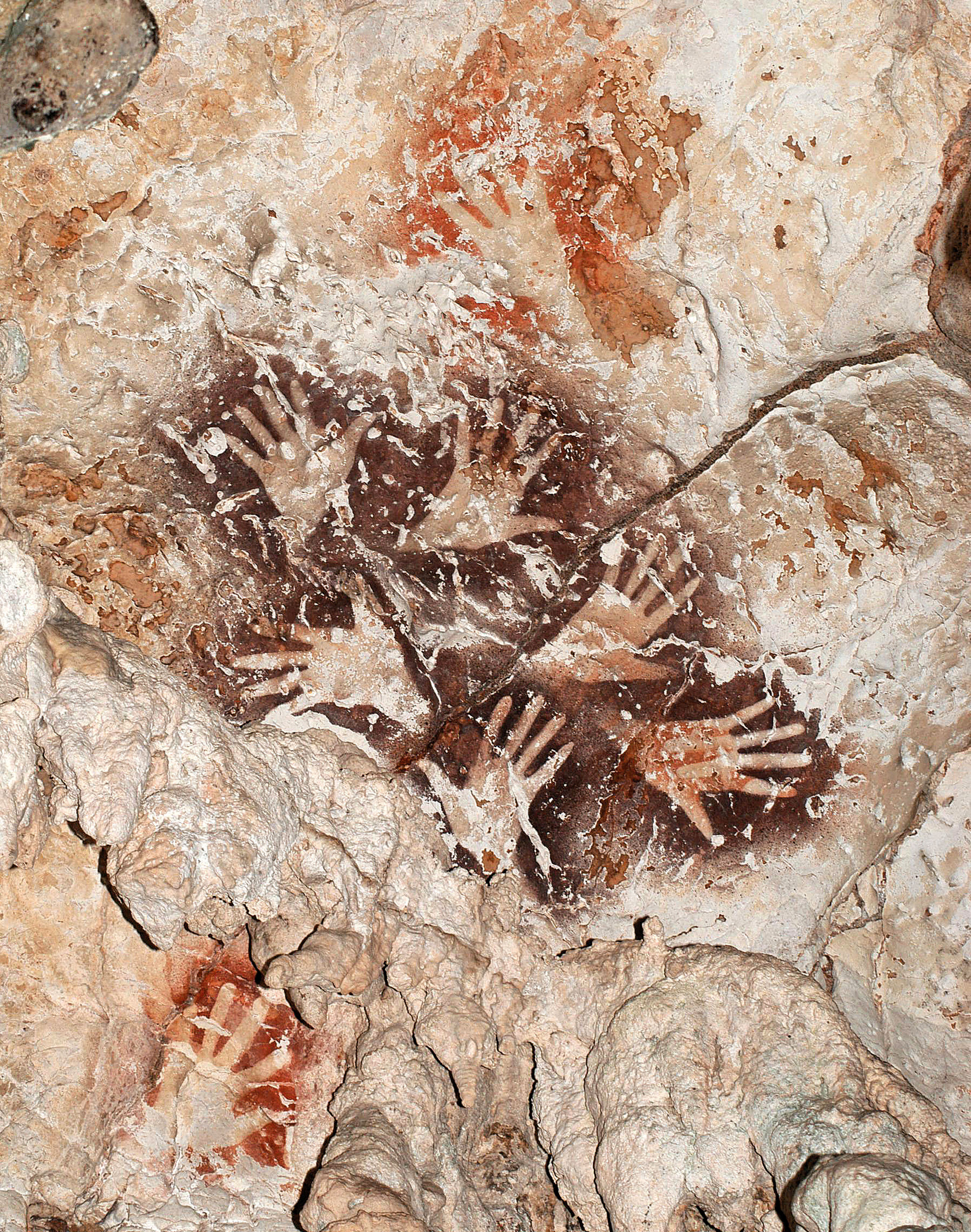
Cave painting in Lubang Jeriji Saléh.

In November 2018, scientists reported the discovery of the oldest known figurative art painting, over 40,000 (perhaps as old as 52,000) years old, of an unknown animal, in the cave of Lubang Jeriji Saléh on the island of Borneo. It has been proposed, based on house construction styles, linguistic and genetic evidence, that Madagascar may have been first populated from southern Borneo.

According to ancient Chinese (977), Indian and Japanese manuscripts, western coastal cities of Borneo had become trading ports by the first millennium AD. In Chinese manuscripts, gold, camphor, tortoise shells, hornbill ivory, rhinoceros horn, crane crest, beeswax, lakawood (a scented heartwood and root wood of a thick liana, Dalbergia parviflora), dragon's blood, rattan, edible bird's nests and various spices were described as among the most valuable items from Borneo. The Indians named Borneo Suvarnabhumi (Land of Gold), and also Karpuradvipa (Camphor Island). The Javanese named Borneo Puradvipa (Diamond Island). Archaeological findings in the Sarawak river delta reveal that the area was a thriving centre of trade between India and China from the 6th century until about 1300.

Territorial loss of the thalassocracy of the Sultanate of Brunei from 1400 to 1890 due to the beginning of Western imperialism

Stone pillars bearing inscriptions in the Pallava script, found in Kutai along the Mahakam River in East Kalimantan and dating to around the second half of the 4th century, constitute some of the oldest evidence of Hindu influence in Southeast Asia. By the 14th century, Borneo became a vassal state of Majapahit (in present-day Indonesia), later changing its allegiance to the Ming dynasty of China. Pre-Islamic Sulu, then known as Lupah Sūg, stretched from Palawan and the Sulu Archipelago in the Philippines, to Sabah, Eastern, and Northern Kalimantan in Borneo. The Sulu Empire rose as a rebellion and reaction against the Majapahit, which had briefly occupied its territory. Islam arrived in the 10th century, brought by Muslim traders who later converted many indigenous peoples in the coastal areas.

The Sultanate of Brunei declared independence from Majapahit following the death of the Majapahit emperor in the mid-14th century. During its golden age under the Bolkiah from the 15th to the 17th century, the Bruneian sultanate ruled almost the entire coastal area of Borneo (lending its name to the island due to its influence in the region) and several islands in the southwestern Philippines. During the 1450s, Shari'ful Hashem Syed Abu Bakr, an Arab born in Johor, arrived in Sulu from Malacca. In 1457, he founded the Sultanate of Sulu; he styled himself Paduka Maulana Mahasari Sharif Sultan Hashem Abu Bakr. Following its independence in 1578 from Bruneian control, the Sultanate of Sulu began to expand its thalassocracy to parts of northern Borneo. Both sultanates who ruled northern Borneo had traditionally engaged in trade with China by means of the frequent Chinese junks. Outside of the two thalassocratic states, Borneo's interior remained free from the rule of any kingdoms.

=== British and Dutch control ===
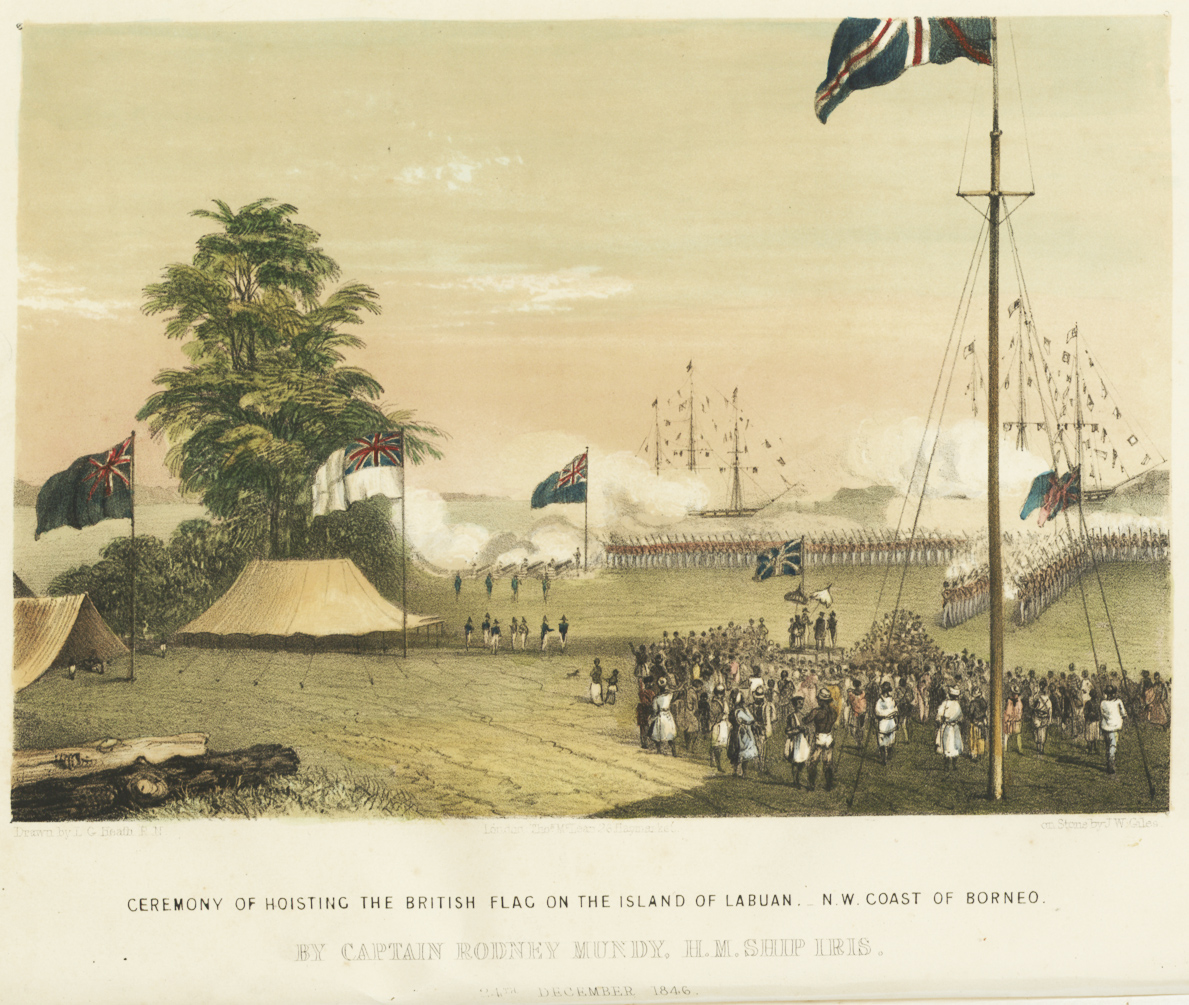
British flag hoisted for the first time on the island of Labuan, on 24 December 1846.

After the fall of Malacca in 1511, Portuguese merchants traded regularly with Borneo, and especially with Brunei from 1530. Having visited Brunei's capital, the Portuguese described the place as surrounded by a stone wall. While Borneo was seen as rich, the Portuguese did not make any attempts to conquer it. The Spanish had sailed from Spanish America and conquered the Brunei's provinces in the Philippines and incorporated it into the Mexico-Centered Viceroyalty of New Spain. The Spanish visit to Brunei led to the Castilian War in 1578. The British began to trade with Sambas of southern Borneo in 1609, while the Dutch only began their trade in 1644: to Banjar and Martapura, also in the southern Borneo. The Dutch tried to settle the island of Balambangan, north of Borneo, in the second half of the 18th century, but withdrew by 1797. In 1812, the sultan in southern Borneo ceded his forts to the British East India Company. The British, led by Stamford Raffles, then tried to establish an intervention in Sambas but failed. Although they managed to defeat the sultanate the next year and declared a blockade on all ports in Borneo except Brunei, Banjarmasin and Pontianak, the project was cancelled by the British governor-general Lord Minto in India as it was too expensive. At the beginning of British and Dutch exploration on the island, they described the island of Borneo as full of head hunters, with the indigenous in the interior practising cannibalism, and the waters around the island infested with pirates, especially between the north eastern Borneo and the southern Philippines. The Malay and Sea Dayak pirates preyed on maritime shipping in the waters between Singapore and Hong Kong from their haven in Borneo, along with the attacks by Illanuns of the Moro pirates from the southern Philippines, such as in the Battle off Mukah.

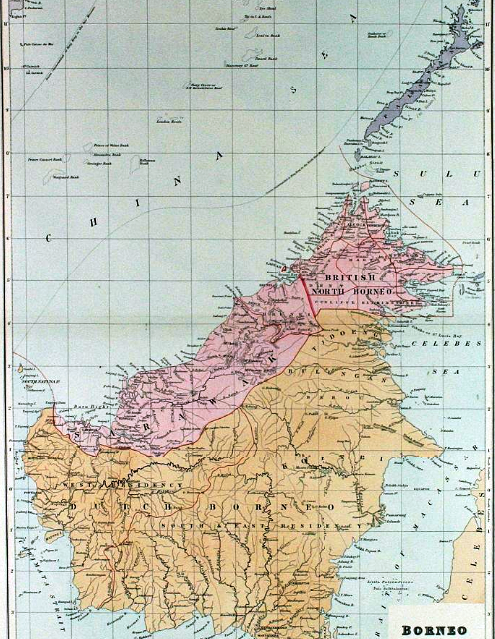
Map of the island, divided between the British and the Dutch, 1898. The present boundaries of Malaysia, Indonesia, and Brunei are largely inherited from British and Dutch colonial rules.

The Dutch began to intervene in the southern part of the island upon resuming contact in 1815, posting residents to Banjarmasin, Pontianak and Sambas and assistant-residents to Landak and Mampawa. The Sultanate of Brunei in 1842 granted large parts of land in Sarawak to the British adventurer James Brooke, as a reward for his help in quelling a local rebellion. Brooke established the Raj of Sarawak and was recognised as its rajah after paying a fee to the sultanate. He established a monarchy, and the Brooke dynasty (through his nephew and great-nephew) ruled Sarawak for 100 years; the leaders were known as the White Rajahs. Brooke also acquired the island of Labuan for Great Britain in 1846 through the Treaty of Labuan with the sultan of Brunei, Omar Ali Saifuddin II on 18 December 1846. The region of northern Borneo came under the administration of North Borneo Chartered Company following the acquisition of territory from the Sultanates of Brunei and Sulu by a German businessman and adventurer named Baron von Overbeck, before it was passed to the British Dent brothers (Alfred Dent and Edward Dent). Further expansion by the British continued into the Borneo interior. This led the 26th sultan of Brunei, Hashim Jalilul Alam Aqamaddin to appeal the British to halt such efforts, and as a result a Treaty of Protection was signed in 1888, rendering Brunei a British protectorate.

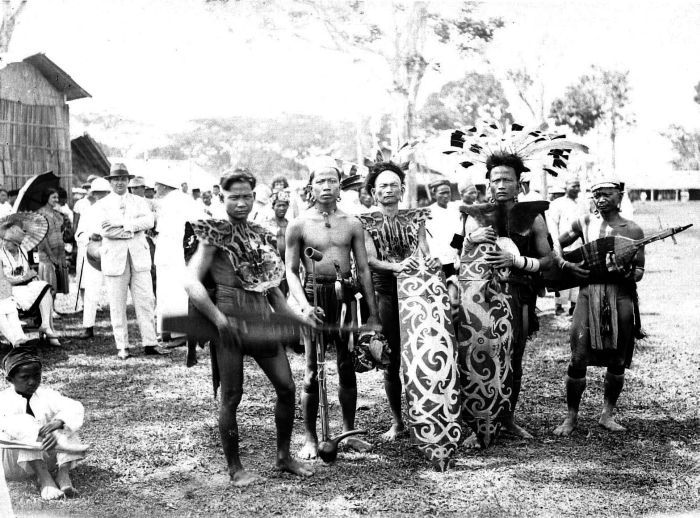
Dayak people during an Erau ceremony in Tenggarong

Before the acquisition by the British, the Americans also managed to establish their temporary presence in northwestern Borneo after acquiring a parcel of land from the Sultanate of Brunei. A company known as American Trading Company of Borneo was formed by Joseph William Torrey, Thomas Bradley Harris and several Chinese investors, establishing a colony named "Ellena" in the Kimanis area. The colony failed and was abandoned, due to denials of financial backing, especially by the US government, and to diseases and riots among the workers. Before Torrey left, he managed to sell the land to the German businessman, Overbeck. Meanwhile, the Germans under William Frederick Schuck were awarded a parcel of land in northeastern Borneo of the Sandakan Bay from the Sultanate of Sulu where he conducted business and exported large quantities of arms, opium, textiles and tobacco to Sulu before the land was also passed to Overbeck by the sultanate.

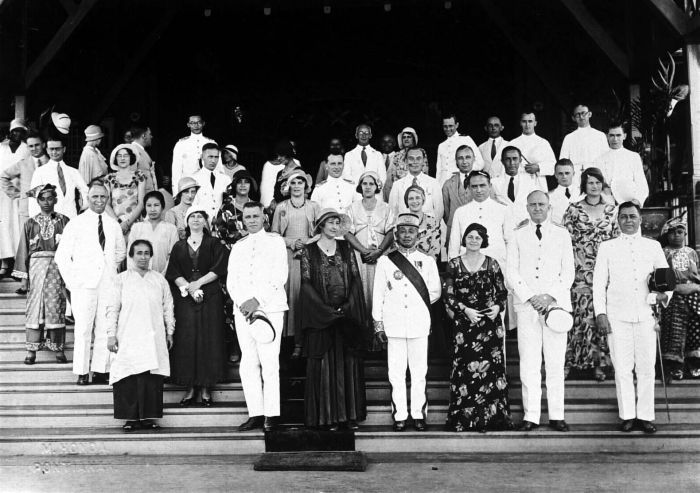
Arab-Malay Sultan of Pontianak in 1930

Prior to the recognition of Spanish presence in the Philippine archipelago, a protocol known as the Madrid Protocol of 1885 was signed between the governments of the United Kingdom, Germany and Spain in Madrid to cement Spanish influence and recognise their sovereignty over the Sultanate of Sulu—in return for Spain's relinquishing its claim to the former possessions of the sultanate in northern Borneo. The British administration then established the first railway network in northern Borneo, known as the North Borneo Railway. During this time, the British sponsored a large number of Chinese workers to migrate to northern Borneo to work in European plantation and mines, and the Dutch followed suit to increase their economic production. By 1888, North Borneo, Sarawak and Brunei in northern Borneo had become British protectorate. The area in southern Borneo was made Dutch protectorate in 1891. The Dutch who already claimed the whole Borneo were asked by Britain to delimit their boundaries between the two colonial territories to avoid further conflicts. The British and Dutch governments had signed the Anglo-Dutch Treaty of 1824 to exchange trading ports in Malay Peninsula and Sumatra that were under their controls and assert spheres of influence. This resulted in indirectly establishing British- and Dutch-controlled areas in the north (Malay Peninsula) and south (Sumatra and Riau Islands) respectively.

In 1895, Marcus Samuel received a concession in the Kutei area of east Borneo, and based on oil seepages in the Mahakam River delta, Mark Abrahams struck oil in February 1897. This was the discovery of the Sanga Sanga Oil Field, a refinery was built in Balikpapan, and discovery of the Samboja Oil Field followed in 1909. In 1901, the Pamusian Oil Field was discovered on Tarakan, and the Bunyu Oil Field in 1929. Royal Dutch Shell discovered the Miri Oil Field in 1910, and the Seria oil field in 1929.

=== World War II ===
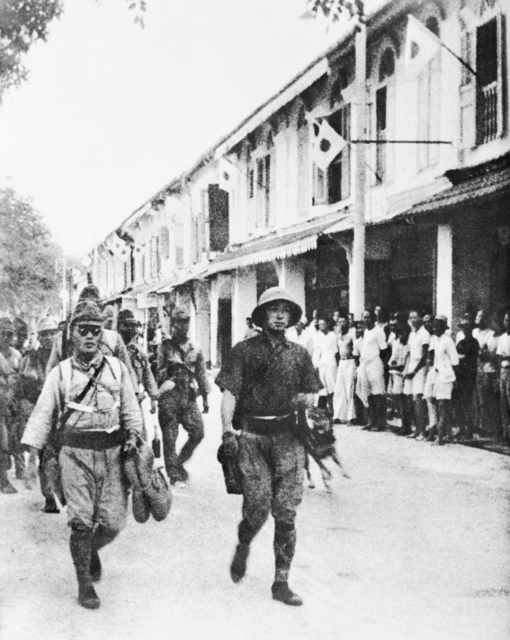
Japanese troops march through the streets of Labuan on 14 January 1942.

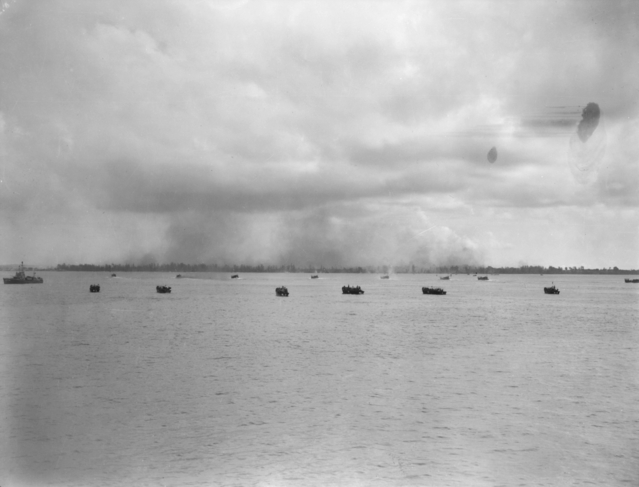
American support craft moving towards Victoria and Brown beach to assist the landing of members of the Australian 24th Infantry Brigade on the island during Operation Oboe Six, 10 June 1945.

During World War II, Japanese forces gained control and occupied most areas of Borneo from 1941 to 1945. In the first stage of the war, the British saw the Japanese advance to Borneo as motivated by political and territorial ambitions rather than economic factors. The occupation drove many people in the coastal towns to the interior, searching for food and escaping the Japanese. The Chinese residents in Borneo, especially with the Sino-Japanese War in Mainland China mostly resisted the Japanese occupation. Following the formation of resistance movements in northern Borneo such as the Jesselton Revolt, many innocent indigenous and Chinese people were executed by the Japanese for their alleged involvement.

In Kalimantan, the Japanese also killed many Malay intellectuals, executing all the Malay sultans of West Kalimantan in the Pontianak incidents, together with Chinese people who were already against the Japanese for suspecting them to be threats. Sultan Muhammad Ibrahim Shafi ud-din II of Sambas was executed in 1944. The sultanate was thereafter suspended and replaced by a Japanese council. The Japanese also set-up Pusat Tenaga Rakjat (PUTERA) in the Indonesian archipelago in 1943, although it was abolished the following year when it became too nationalistic. Some of the Indonesian nationalist like Sukarno and Hatta who had returned from Dutch exile began to co-operate with the Japanese. Shortly after his release, Sukarno became president of the Central Advisory Council, an advisory council for south Borneo, Celebes, and Lesser Sunda, set up in February 1945.

After the fall of Singapore, the Japanese sent several thousand of British and Australian prisoners of war to camps in Borneo such as Batu Lintang camp. From the Sandakan camp site, only six of some 2,500 prisoners survived after they were forced to march in an event known as the Sandakan Death March. In addition, of the total of 17,488 Javanese labourers brought in by the Japanese during the occupation, only 1,500 survived mainly due to starvation, harsh working conditions and maltreatment. The Dayak and other indigenous people played a role in guerrilla warfare against the occupying forces, particularly in the Kapit Division. They temporarily revived headhunting of Japanese toward the end of the war, with Allied Z Special Unit provided assistance to them. Australia contributed significantly to the liberation of Borneo. The Australian Imperial Force was sent to Borneo to fight off the Japanese. Together with other Allies, the island was completely liberated in 1945.

=== Recent history ===
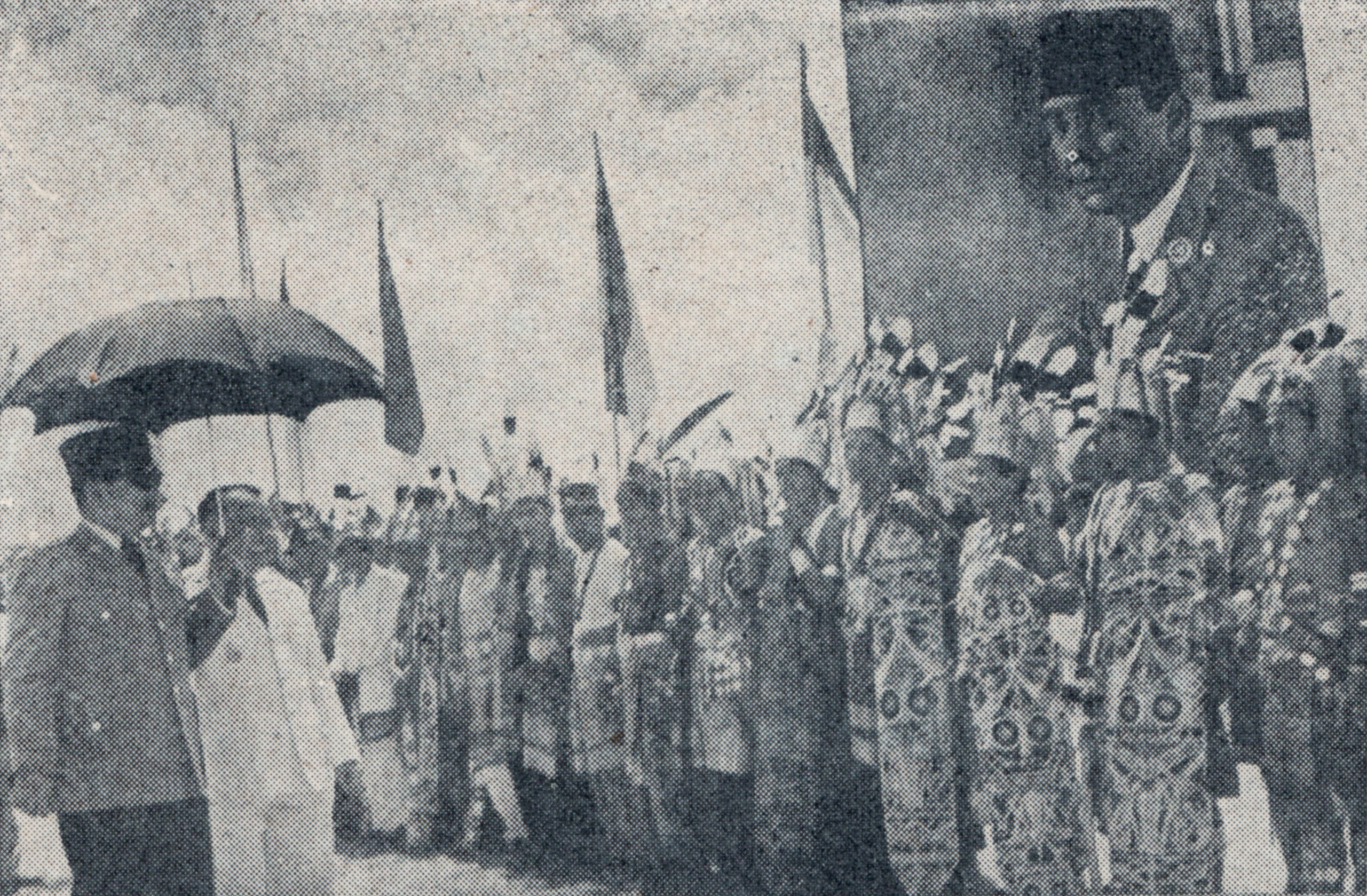
Sukarno visiting Pontianak, West Kalimantan, in 1963.

In May 1945, officials in Tokyo suggested that whether northern Borneo should be included in the proposed new country of Indonesia should be separately determined based on the desires of its indigenous people and following the disposition of Malaya. Sukarno and Mohammad Yamin meanwhile continuously advocated for a Greater Indonesian republic. Towards the end of the war, Japan decided to give an early independence to a new proposed country of Indonesia on 17 July 1945, with an Independence Committee meeting scheduled for 19 August 1945. However, following the surrender of Japan to the Allied forces, the meeting was shelved. Sukarno and Hatta continued the plan by unilaterally declaring independence, although the Dutch tried to retake their colonial possession in Borneo.

The southern part of the island achieved its independence through the Proclamation of Indonesian Independence on 17 August 1945. The southern part saw guerrilla conflicts followed by Dutch blockades to cut supplies for nationalist within the region. While nationalist guerrillas supporting the inclusion of southern Borneo in the new Indonesian republic were active in Ketapang, and to lesser extent in Sambas where they rallied with the red-white flag which became the flag of Indonesia, most of the Chinese residents in southern Borneo expected to be liberated by Chinese Nationalist troops from mainland China and to integrate their districts as an overseas province of China. Meanwhile, Sarawak and Sabah in northern Borneo became separate British crown colonies in 1946.

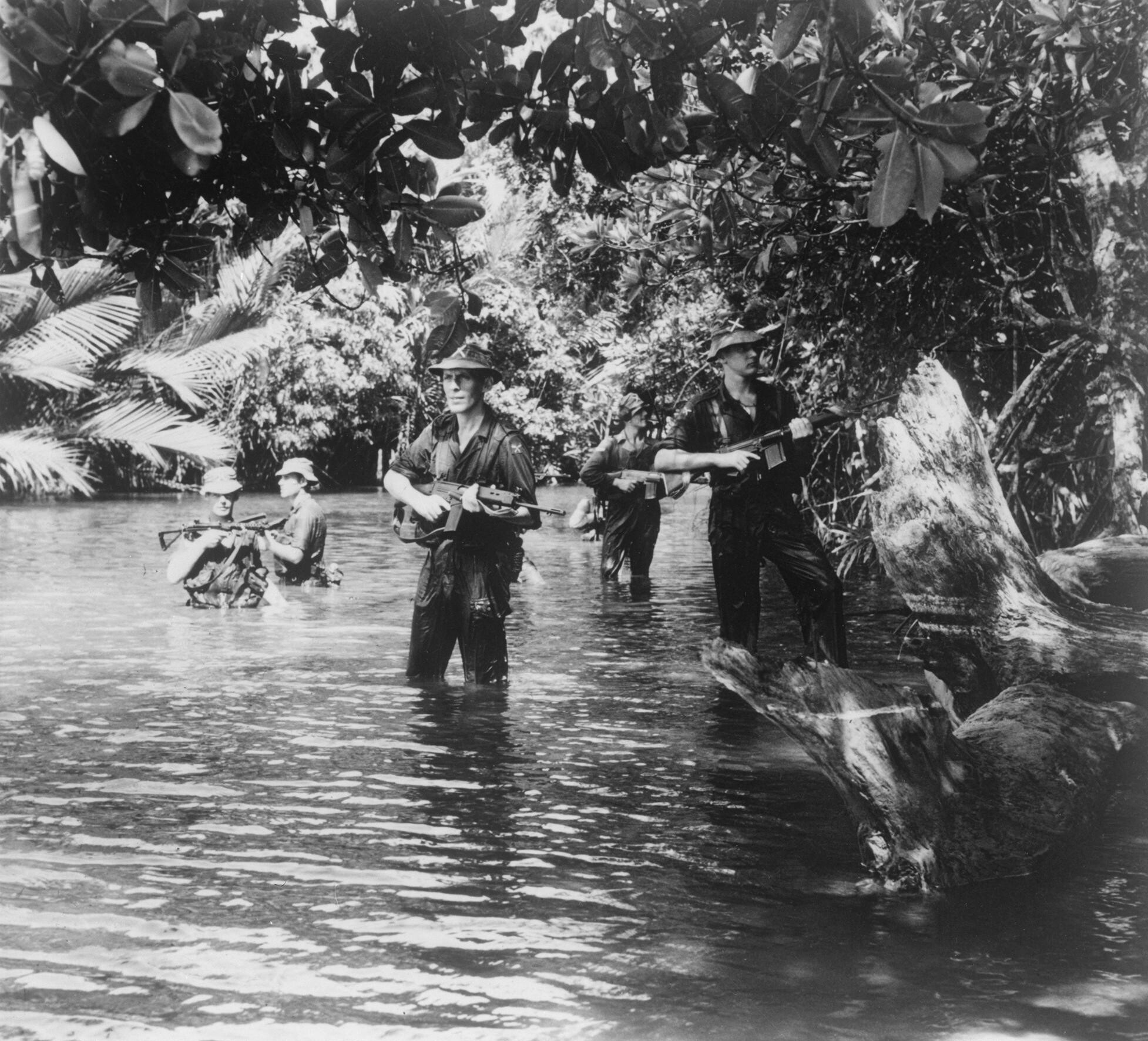
The Queen's Own Highlanders 1st Battalion conduct a patrol to search for enemy positions in the jungle of Brunei.

In 1961, Prime Minister Tunku Abdul Rahman of the independent Federation of Malaya desired to unite Malaya, the British colonies of Sarawak, North Borneo, Singapore and the protectorate of Brunei under the proposed Federation of Malaysia. The idea was heavily opposed by the governments in both Indonesia and the Philippines as well from communist sympathisers and nationalists in Borneo. Sukarno, as the president of the new republic, perceiving the British trying to maintain their presence in northern Borneo and the Malay Peninsula, decided to launch a military infiltration, later known as the confrontation, from 1962 to 1969. As a response to the growing opposition, the British deployed their armed forces to guard their colonies against Indonesian and communist revolts. Australia and New Zealand also participated in these measures.

The Philippines opposed the newly proposed federation, claiming the eastern part of North Borneo (today the Malaysian state of Sabah) as part of its territory as a former possession of the Sultanate of Sulu. The Philippine government mostly based their claim on the Sultanate of Sulu's cession agreement with the British North Borneo Company, as by now the sultanate had come under the jurisdiction of the Philippine republican administration, which therefore should inherit the Sulu former territories. The Philippine government also claimed that the heirs of the sultanate had ceded all their territorial rights to the republic.

The proposed flag of the North Borneo Federation, an attempt to establish a sovereign state by unifying North Borneo, Brunei, and Sarawak by A. M. Azahari

The Sultanate of Brunei at first welcomed the proposal of a new larger federation. Meanwhile, the Brunei People's Party led by A.M. Azahari desired to reunify Brunei, Sarawak and North Borneo into one federation known as the North Borneo Federation (Malay: Kesatuan Negara Kalimantan Utara), where the sultan of Brunei would be the head of state for the federation—though Azahari had his own intention to abolish the Brunei monarchy, to make Brunei more democratic, and to integrate the territory and other former British colonies in Borneo into Indonesia, with the support from the latter government. This directly led to the Brunei Revolt, which thwarted Azahari's attempt and forced him to escape to Indonesia. Brunei withdrew from being part of the new Federation of Malaysia due to some disagreements on other issues while political leaders in Sarawak and North Borneo continued to favour inclusion in a larger federation.

With the continuous opposition from Indonesia and the Philippines, the Cobbold Commission was established to discover the feeling of the native populations in northern Borneo; it found the people greatly in favour of federation, with various stipulations. The federation was successfully achieved with the inclusion of northern Borneo through the Malaysia Agreement on 16 September 1963. To this day, the area in northern Borneo is still subjected to attacks by Moro pirates since the 18th century and militant from groups such as Abu Sayyaf since 2000 in the frequent cross border attacks. During the administration of Philippine president Ferdinand Marcos, Marcos made some attempts to destabilise the state of Sabah, although his plan failed and resulted in the Jabidah massacre and later the insurgency in the southern Philippines.

Brunei remained a British protected state after 1963. Following the 1979 Treaty of Friendship and Cooperation with the United Kingdom, Brunei resumed full responsibility for its international affairs and defence and became fully independent on 1 January 1984.

In August 2019, Indonesian president Joko Widodo announced a plan to move the capital of Indonesia from Jakarta to a newly established location in the East Kalimantan province in Borneo.

Brunei occupies only a small proportion of Borneo's present-day land area, but the Sultanate of Brunei played a substantially larger role in the island's pre-colonial history. For several centuries it was one of the principal maritime states of northern Borneo, and its political and commercial influence extended beyond the boundaries of modern Brunei. The survival of the Sultanate through the colonial period also resulted in Brunei becoming the only pre-colonial Bornean monarchy to emerge as a separate sovereign state following decolonisation.

== Demographics ==
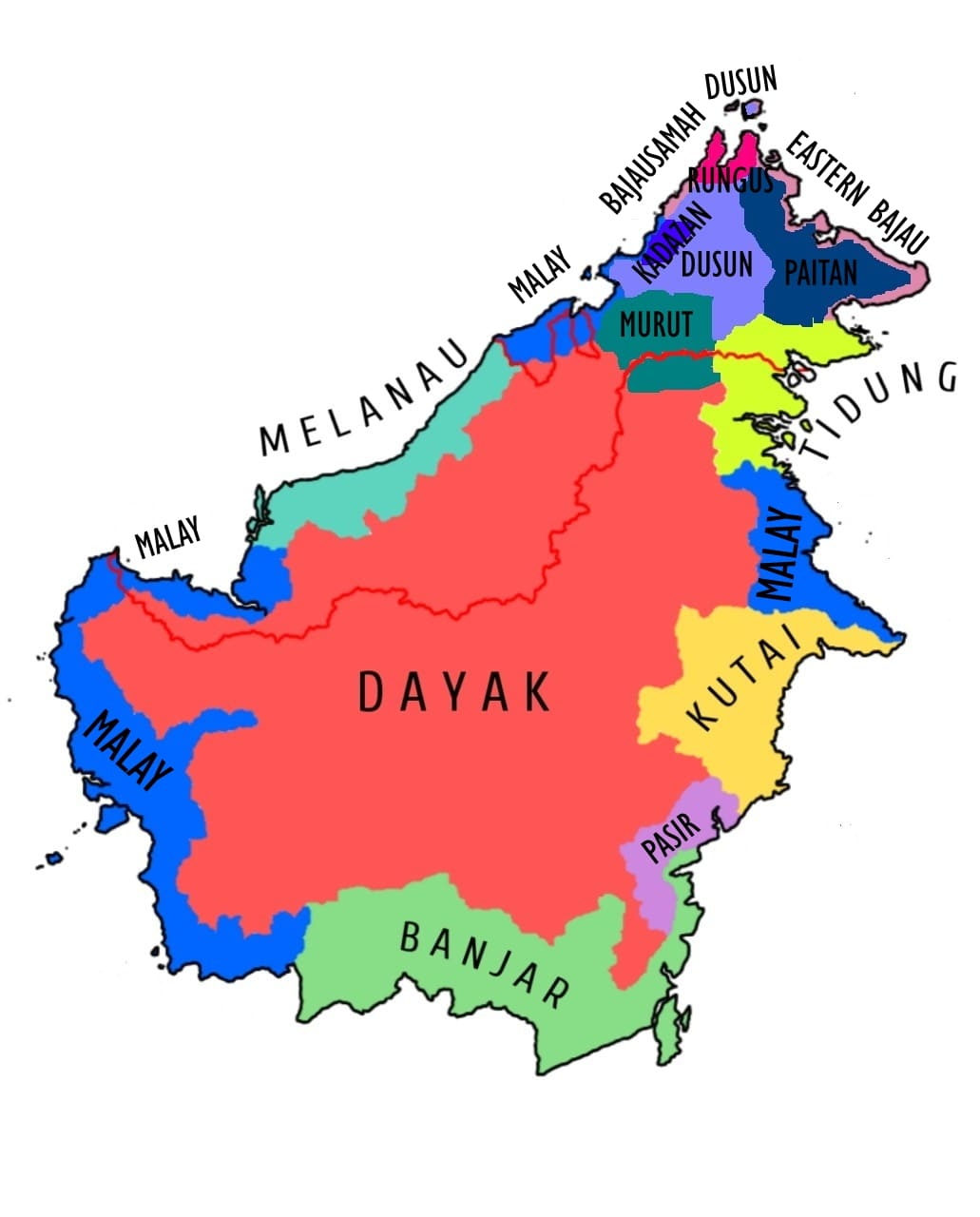
Visual map of different ethnic groups on Borneo.

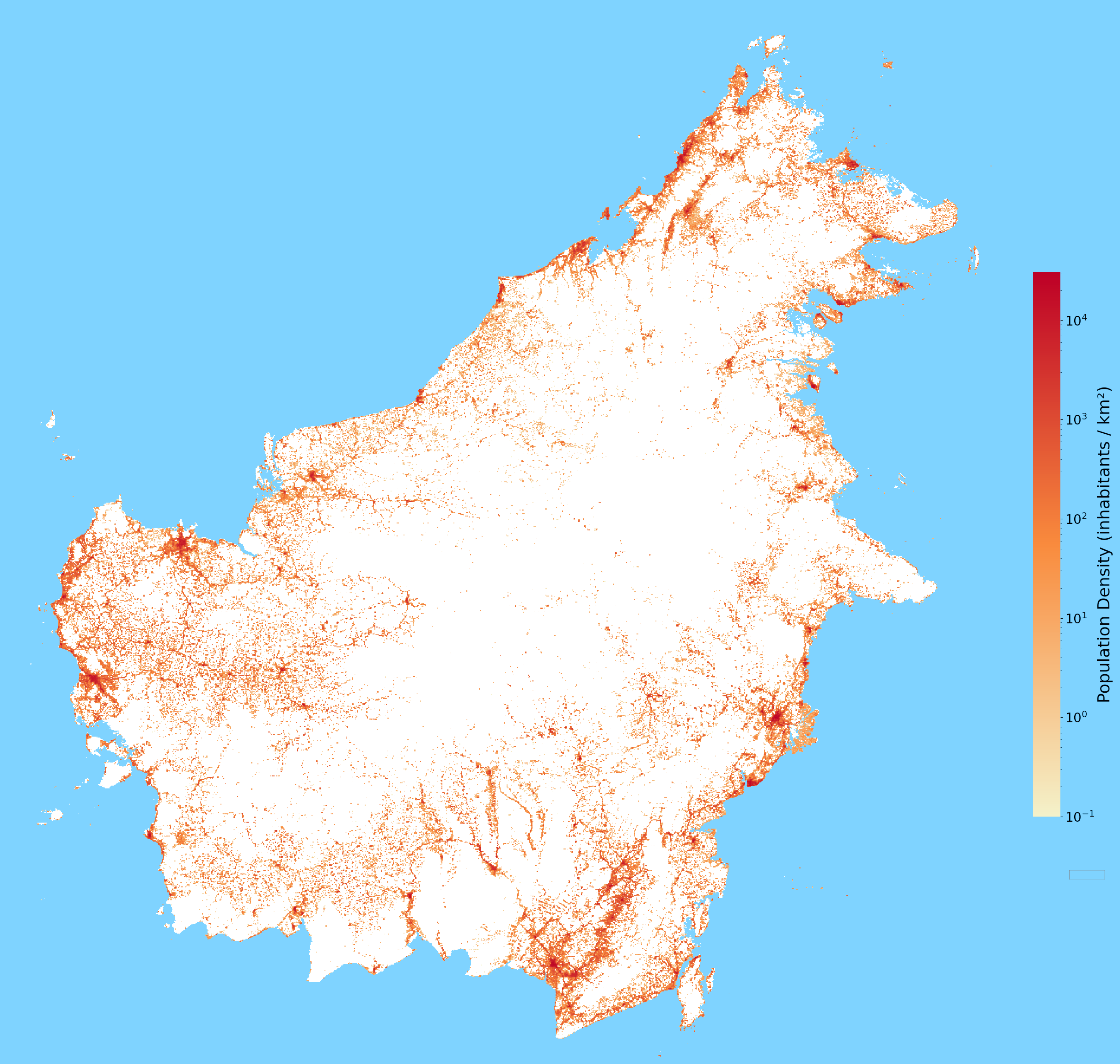
Population Density of Borneo.

The demonym for Borneo is Bornean.

Borneo had 23,053,723 inhabitants (in 2020 Censuses), a population density of 30.8 inhabitants per square kilometre (80 inhabitants per square mile). Most of the population lives in coastal cities, although the hinterland has small towns and villages along the rivers.

Borneo is home to a number of different Indigenous peoples and distinct languages and cultures. Dayak is inconsistently used as a collective term for non-Muslim Austronesian Indigenous peoples from Borneo, encompassing the Iban and Bidayuh in East Malaysia, and the Kayan, Kenyah and Ngaju of Kalimantan. Historically, many Dayaks lived in communal longhouses, lacked class structure and practiced shifting cultivation for subsistence.

=== Territories by population, size, and time zone ===
Country	Population	Province/state	Capital	Time zone
Brunei^{a} ^{b}	460,345 (2% of the population)		Bandar Seri Begawan	UTC+8
Indonesia (Kalimantan)^{a}	16,544,696 (72% of the population)	North Kalimantan	Tanjung Selor	UTC+8
Indonesia (Kalimantan)^{a}	16,544,696 (72% of the population)	East Kalimantan	Samarinda	UTC+8
Indonesia (Kalimantan)^{a}	16,544,696 (72% of the population)	South Kalimantan	Banjarbaru	UTC+8
Indonesia (Kalimantan)^{a}	16,544,696 (72% of the population)	Central Kalimantan	Palangka Raya	UTC+7
Indonesia (Kalimantan)^{a}	16,544,696 (72% of the population)	West Kalimantan	Pontianak	UTC+7
Malaysia (East Malaysia)^{a}	5,967,582 (26% of the population)	Sabah	Kota Kinabalu	UTC+8
Malaysia (East Malaysia)^{a}	5,967,582 (26% of the population)	Sarawak	Kuching	UTC+8
Malaysia (East Malaysia)^{a}	5,967,582 (26% of the population)	Labuan	Victoria	UTC+8
Total	22,972,623			

^{a} May includes the offshore islands and its populations
^{b} Due to its size, Brunei is further subdivided into 4 districts (mukim), which is similar to the size of smaller administrative units in Indonesia (kecamatan) and Malaysia (daerah)

=== 20 largest cities and towns in Borneo by population ===
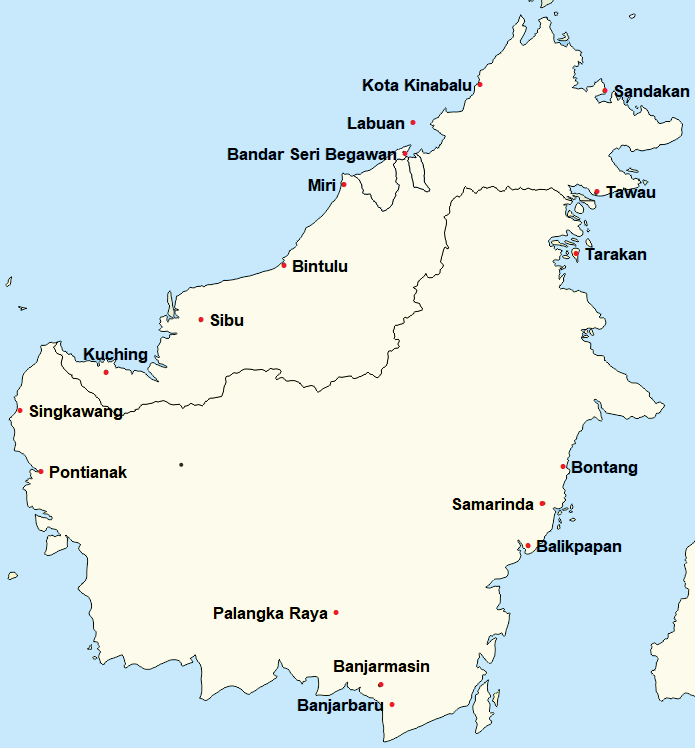
Cities and major towns in Borneo

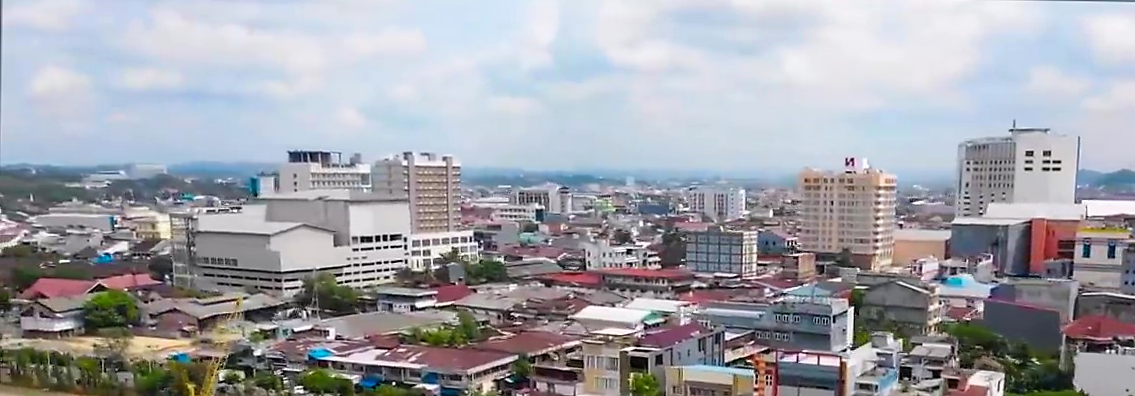
Samarinda, the most populous and largest city on the island of Borneo

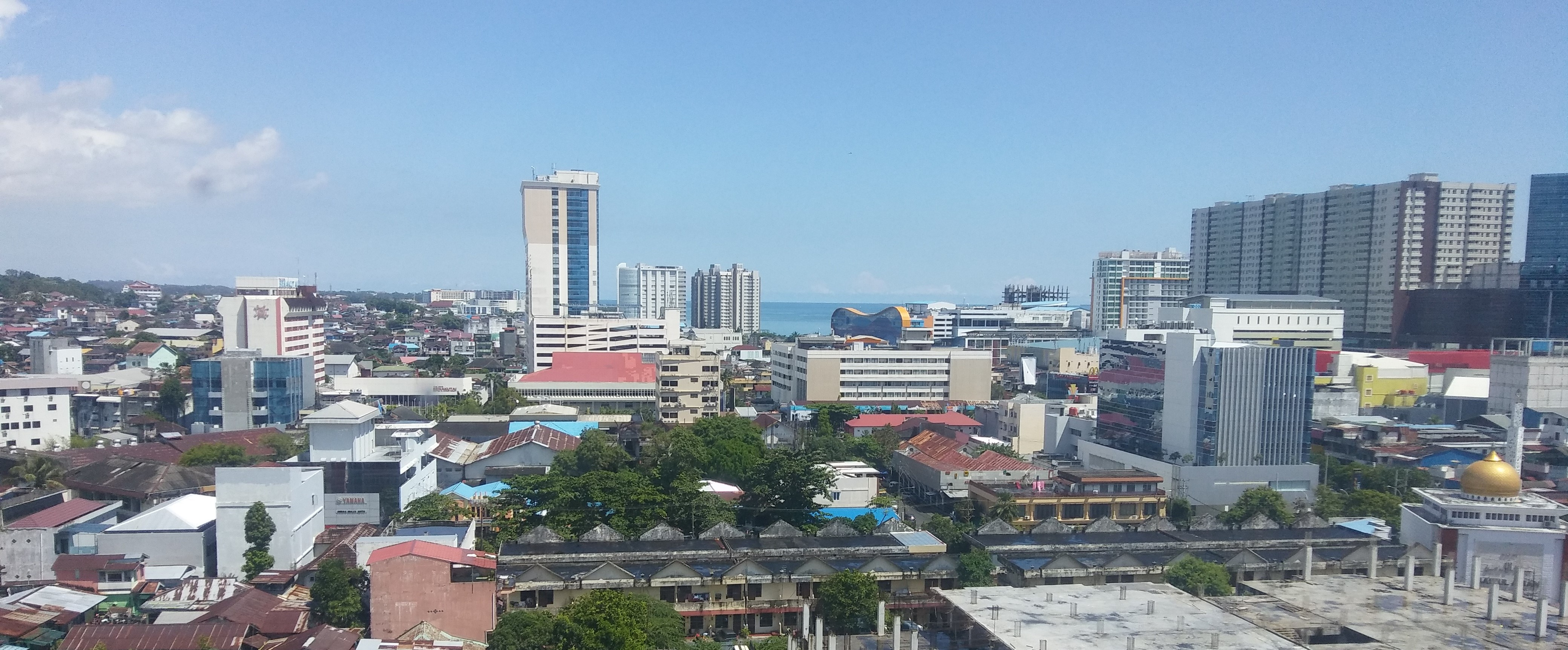
Balikpapan, the second most populous and largest city on Borneo

- Provincial/state capital
- National capital

Rank	City	Population	Country	Province/state/district
1	Samarinda	861,878	Indonesia	East Kalimantan
2	Balikpapan	738,532	Indonesia	East Kalimantan
3	Pontianak	679,818	Indonesia	West Kalimantan
4	Banjarmasin	678,243	Indonesia	South Kalimantan
5	Kota Kinabalu	500,425	Malaysia	Sabah
6	Sandakan	439,050	Malaysia	Sabah
7	Tawau	420,806	Malaysia	Sabah
8	Kuching	402,738	Malaysia	Sarawak
9	Miri	356,900	Malaysia	Sarawak
10	Bandar Seri Begawan	318,530	Brunei	Brunei–Muara
11	Palangkaraya	305,797	Indonesia	Central Kalimantan
12	Banjarbaru	272,763	Indonesia	South Kalimantan
13	Tarakan	249,960	Indonesia	North Kalimantan
14	Singkawang	246,112	Indonesia	West Kalimantan
15	Bontang	189,968	Indonesia	East Kalimantan
16	Sampit	166,773	Indonesia	Central Kalimantan
17	Sibu	162,676	Malaysia	Sarawak
18	Nusantara	147,430	Indonesia	Nusantara
19	Bintulu	114,058	Malaysia	Sarawak
20	Tenggarong	106,669	Indonesia	East Kalimantan

=== Urbanisation by region ===
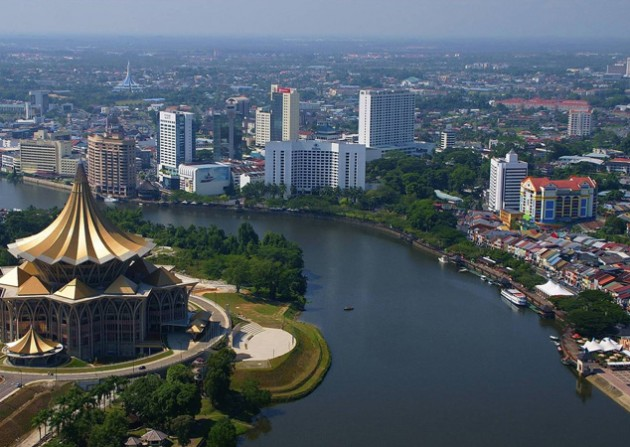
Kuching, one of the largest cities on the island of Borneo

Country	Province/state	Urban–rural population (%)	
Country	Province/state	Urban	Rural
Brunei Darussalam		80.1%	19.9%
Indonesia (Kalimantan)	Nusantara	100.0%	0.0%
Indonesia (Kalimantan)	East Kalimantan; North Kalimantan^{c}	68.9%	31.1%
Indonesia (Kalimantan)	South Kalimantan	48.4%	51.6%
Indonesia (Kalimantan)	Central Kalimantan	40.2%	59.8%
Indonesia (Kalimantan)	West Kalimantan	36.2%	63.8%
Malaysia (East Malaysia)	Sabah	54.7%	45.3%
Malaysia (East Malaysia)	Sarawak	57.0%	43.0%
Malaysia (East Malaysia)	Labuan	88.9%	11.1%

^{c} Data based on the projection in the former territories in East Kalimantan Province (prior to the separation of North Kalimantan in 2012)

=== Major ethnicities by region ===
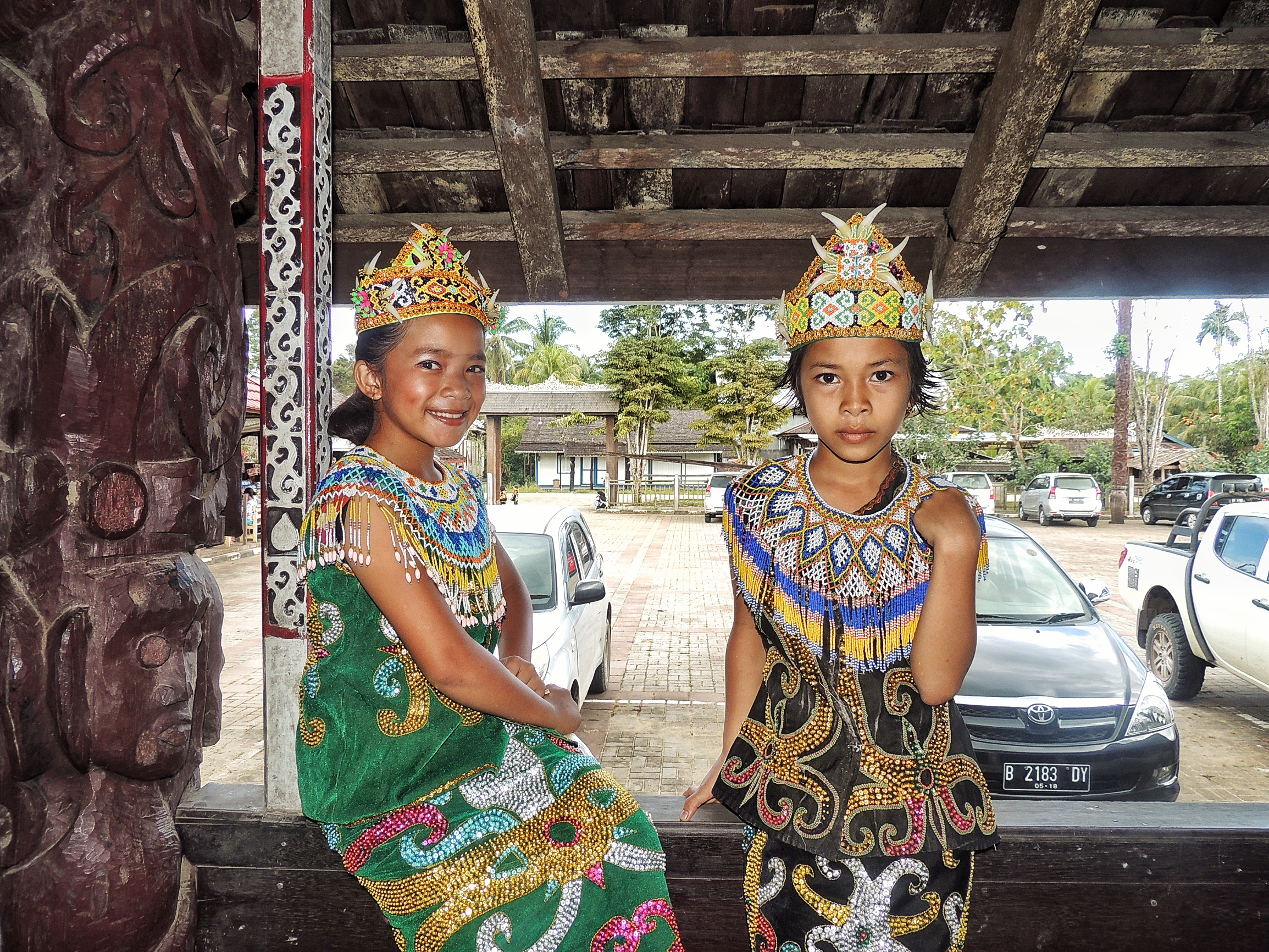
Young Dayak dancers in their traditional clothes, Pampang Cultural Village, Samarinda, East Kalimantan, Indonesia

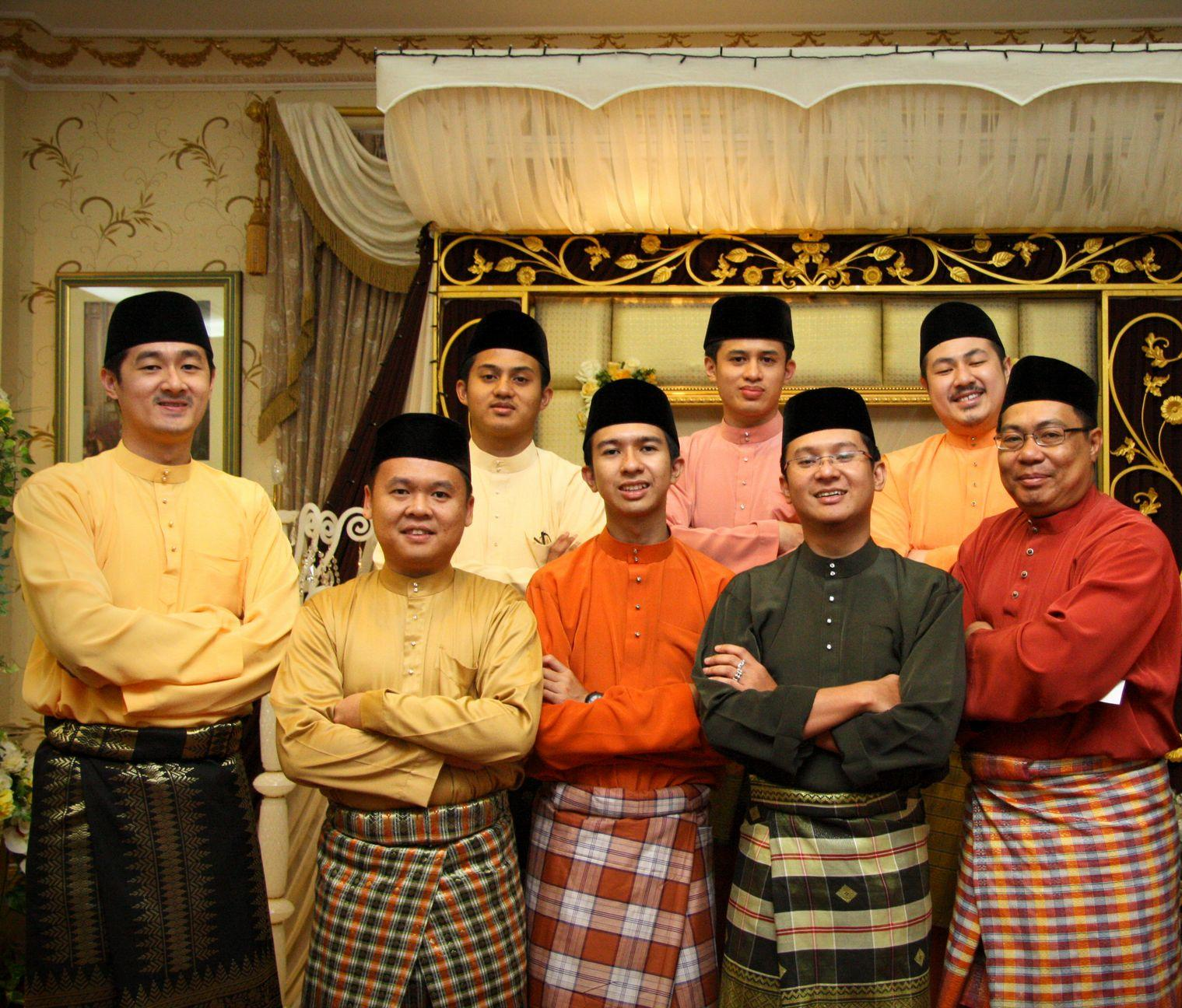
A group of Bruneian men in Baju Melayu; the ethnic Malays of Borneo primarily inhabit the coastal areas of the island.

Country	Province/state	Major ethnic groups^{d}	
Country	Province/state	Indigenous	Non-indigenous
Brunei Darussalam		Malay, Bisaya, Dusun, Kedayan, Belait, Tutong, Murut	Chinese Bruneian
Indonesia (Kalimantan)	North Kalimantan	Bulungan, Dayak, Tidung, Kenyah	Bugis, Javanese
Indonesia (Kalimantan)	East Kalimantan	Banjarese, Berau, Dayak, Kutai, Paser, Kenyah	Bugis, Javanese
Indonesia (Kalimantan)	Nusantara	Dayak, Kutai, Balik, Kenyah	Javanese, Sundanese, Chinese, Minahasan, Torajan, Batak
Indonesia (Kalimantan)	South Kalimantan	Banjarese, Dayak	Bugis, Javanese, Madurese
Indonesia (Kalimantan)	Central Kalimantan	Banjarese, Dayak, Malay	Javanese, Madurese
Indonesia (Kalimantan)	West Kalimantan	Dayak, Malay	Chinese, Javanese, Madurese
Malaysia (East Malaysia)	Sabah	Kadazan, Dusun, Bajau, Paitan, Murut, Rungus, Lundayeh, Malay, Bisaya, Suluk	Bugis, Chinese, Moro
Malaysia (East Malaysia)	Sarawak	Bidayuh, Iban, Malay, Melanau, Orang Ulu	Chinese
Malaysia (East Malaysia)	Labuan	Kadazan, Dusun, Kedayan, Malay, Lundayeh, Murut	Chinese

^{d} Based on alphabetical order

=== Religion ===
Religions based on regions
Religion in Brunei (2016): 1. Islam (80.9%); 2. Christianity (7.10%); 3. Buddhism (7.00%); 4. Other (5.00%)	Religion in Malaysian Borneo (2020): 1. Islam (51.9%); 2. Christianity (37.4%); 3. Buddhism (9.00%); 4. Confucianism and others (0.30%); 5. Hinduism (0.10%); 6. No religion (1.30%)	Religion in Indonesian Borneo (December 2023): 1. Islam (78.4%); 2. Protestantism (9.30%); 3. Roman Catholicism (9.09%); 4. Buddhism (1.94%); 5. Hinduism (1.08%); 6. Confucianism (0.10%); 7. Folk religion (0.06%)

== Administration ==
The island of Borneo is divided administratively by three countries.

- The independent sultanate of Brunei (main part and eastern exclave of Temburong)
- The Indonesian provinces of East, South, West, North and Central Kalimantan, as well as Capital Specific Region of Nusantara, in Kalimantan
- The East Malaysian states of Sabah and Sarawak, as well as the Federal Territory of Labuan (on offshore islands nearby)

Political divisions of Borneo

== Economy ==
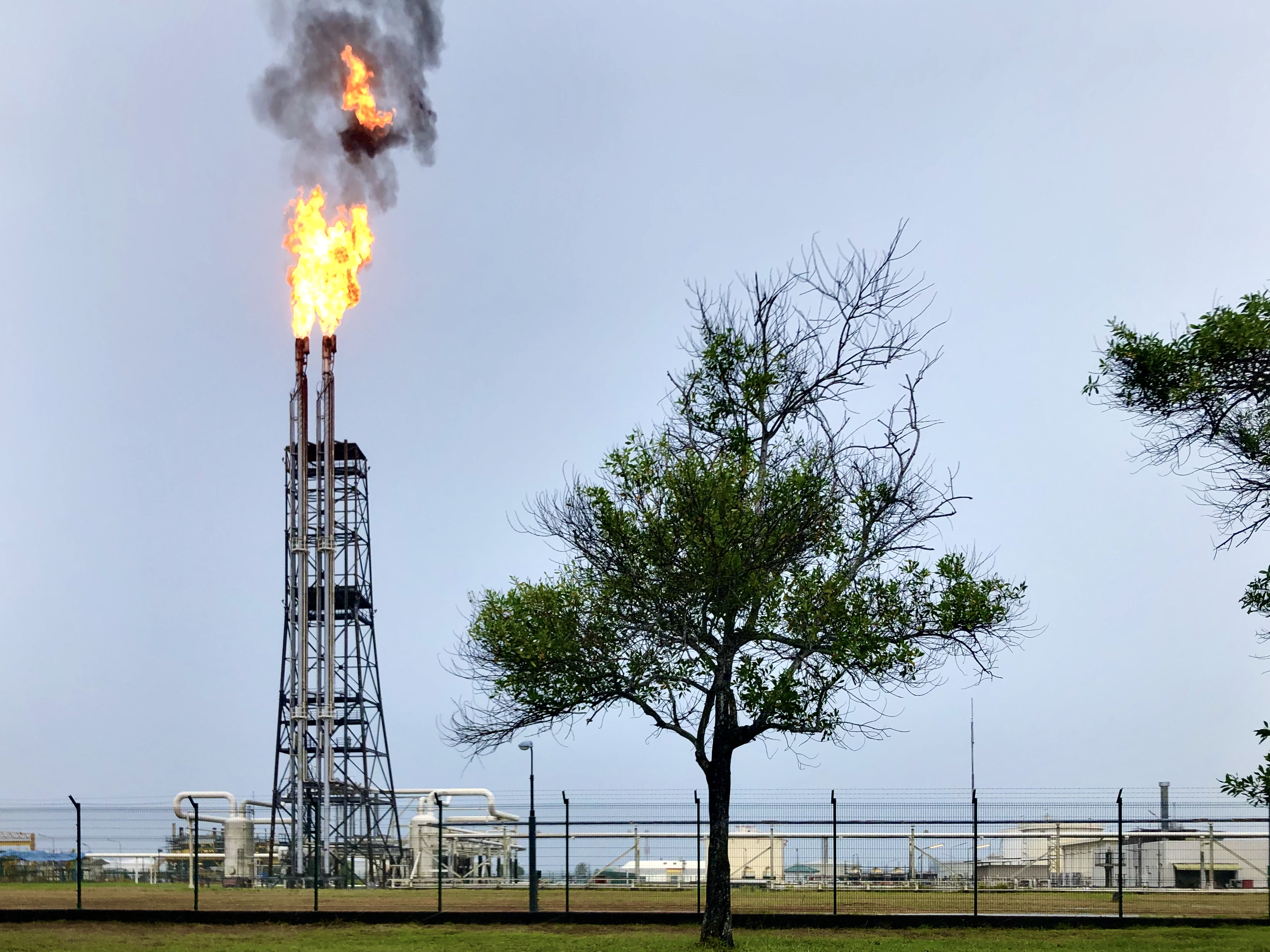
Seria Oil Refinery, Brunei Darussalam

Borneo's economy depends mainly on agriculture, logging and mining, oil and gas, and ecotourism. Brunei's economy is highly dependent on the oil and gas production sector, and the country has become one of the largest oil producers in Southeast Asia. The Malaysian states of Sabah and Sarawak are both top exporters of timber. Sabah is also known as the agricultural producer of rubber, cacao, and vegetables, and for its fisheries, while Sabah, Sarawak and Labuan export liquefied natural gas (LNG) and petroleum. The Indonesian provinces of Kalimantan are mostly dependent on mining sectors despite also being involved in logging and oil and gas explorations.

=== List of territories by GDP/GRP 2023 ===
Country	Province/state	GDP nominal billion	Territorial GDP	GDP/GRP per capita	Territorial per capita	
Country	Province/state	Brunei		US$ 15.126		US$ 33,576
Indonesia (Kalimantan)	North Kalimantan	US$ 9.662	US$ 114.383	US$ 13,236	US$ 6,627	
Indonesia (Kalimantan)	East Kalimantan	US$ 55.344	US$ 114.383	US$ 14,155	US$ 6,627	
Indonesia (Kalimantan)	South Kalimantan	US$ 17.668	US$ 114.383	US$ 4,184	US$ 6,627	
Indonesia (Kalimantan)	Central Kalimantan	US$ 13.702	US$ 114.383	US$ 4,940	US$ 6,627	
Indonesia (Kalimantan)	West Kalimantan	US$ 18.007	US$ 114.383	US$ 3,202	US$ 6,627	
Malaysia (East Malaysia)	Sabah	US$ 24.534	US$ 57.565	US$ 6,828	US$ 8,649	
Malaysia (East Malaysia)	Sarawak	US$ 31.209	US$ 57.565	US$ 15,875	US$ 8,649	
Malaysia (East Malaysia)	Labuan	US$ 1.822	US$ 57.565	US$ 18,327	US$ 8,649	

== Human Development Index by territory ==
HDI is a statistic of combined indicators that takes into account life expectancy, health, education and per-capita income.

Country	Province/state	HDI score	Country comparison
Brunei		0.829 (2022)	Kuwait (0.831)
Indonesia (Kalimantan)	North Kalimantan	0.748 (2026)	Saint Lucia (0.748)
Indonesia (Kalimantan)	East Kalimantan	0.801 (2026)	Bosnia and Herzegovina (0.804)
Indonesia (Kalimantan)	South Kalimantan	0.768 (2026)	Tonga (0.769)
Indonesia (Kalimantan)	Central Kalimantan	0.755 (2026)	Paraguay (0.756)
Indonesia (Kalimantan)	West Kalimantan	0.730 (2026)	Botswana (0.731)
Malaysia (East Malaysia)	Sabah	0.767 (2024)	Iran (0.774)
Malaysia (East Malaysia)	Sarawak	0.821 (2024)	Russia (0.822)
Malaysia (East Malaysia)	Labuan	0.847 (2024)	Turkey (0.838)

== See also ==
- Hikayat Banjar
- Kutai basin
- List of islands of Indonesia
- List of islands of Malaysia
- Maphilindo
- List of bats of Borneo
