= Erau =

Indonesian biennial cultural festival

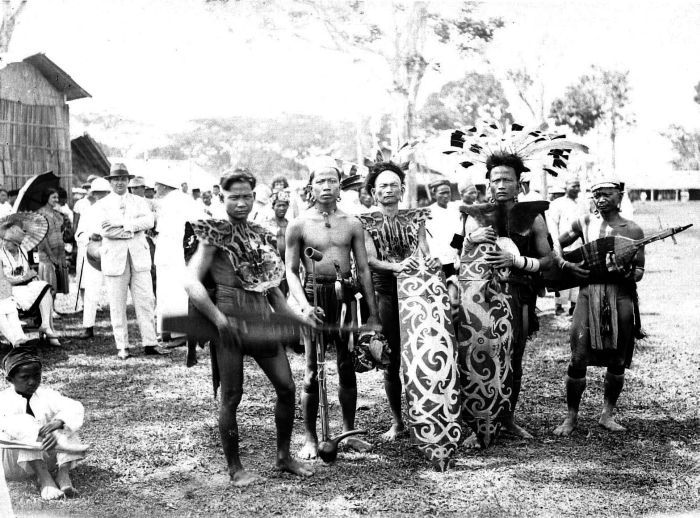
The Dayak tribe during an Erau ceremony in Tenggarong

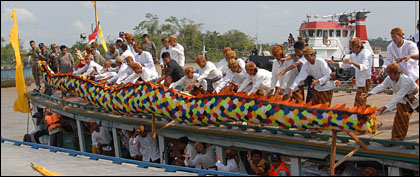
Mengulur Naga, one of the contemporary Erau procession

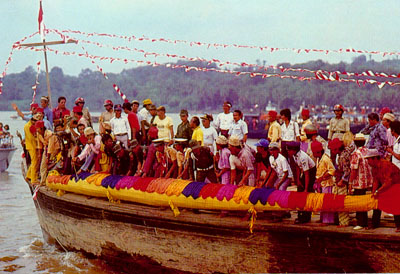
Mengulur Naga (literally unfurling the dragon)

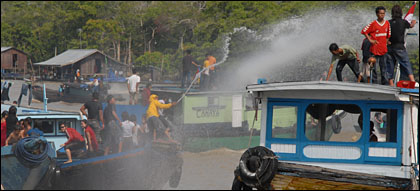
Belimbur, the top event in contemporary Erau procession, where festival participants spray each other with water

Erau is an Indonesian biennial cultural festival, taking place in the city of Tenggarong, Kutai Kartanegara, East Kalimantan. The word Erau is derived from the Kutai word eroh, meaning crowded, noisy, joyful.

== Legend of Erau ==
The legend began in the Kutai Kartanegara Ing Martadipura Kingdom in the 13th century, when it was situated in Tepian Baru or Kutai Lama. It is a legend of the greatness of the Kingdom's first Sultan, who was said to be a descent from BROT.

The story goes that in a village called Jaitan Layar, in the East Kalimantan mountainous slope, a kingdom official and his wife has been married for a few years, but had not yet been blessed with a child. They would pray to their God, hoping that a child will soon be born.

One night, as the couple were sleeping, they were interrupted by a deafening noise from the outside. A bright light shone on the night as if it was daylight. The wife told his husband to check what the whole commotion is all about. When outside, the husband found a box made of golden stone. He opened the lid and inside he found a baby covered with a golden blanket. On the baby's right hand was an egg and on his left was a golden kris.

Suddenly seven Gods appeared before him. One of the Gods would say,

"Praise the Gods, you wish has been granted. This baby is the descendant of God. He needs to lay on your relatives laps for 40 days and 40 nights, his feet cannot touch the ground. His bath must be scented with blooms and roses. His feet cannot touch the earth until after the Erau Ceremony. In the ceremonial Tijak Tanah (literally stepping on earth), his feet shall step on the head of a human, living and dead. His feet shall step on the head of a buffalo, living and dead. Then he shall perform the Mandi ke Tepian rite (literally bathing to the shore), by taking a bath in the river."

The husband told the Gods that he will obey all of their commands and thanked them for answering his prayers. Once the Gods disappeared, he took the baby inside to his wife. The baby cried of hunger, confused as to what to do, the husband burnt incense, scatter yellow rice on the floor, and prayed to the Gods. Soon after, the God told the wife, "Wipe your breast with your hand repeatedly until milk is flowing". The wife did as she was told and aromatic milk flowed, which the baby lapped up ravenously.

For the next 40 days and nights, obeying the Gods' commands, the baby laid on the villagers' laps. He was bathed with flower water. And on the third day, his umbilical cord broke off and the villagers celebrated the occasion by shooting fire to the sky for seven times. The baby was named Aji Batara Agung Dewa Sakti.

As the boy grew up to be 5 years old, he was restless and impatient, he wants to be able to play outside, swim in the river, walk around the village like other children. The husband then remembered the God's command and so he arranged with the villagers of Jaitan Layar to conduct the Erau ceremony. This was to be the first Erau ceremony. It was conducted lavishly for the next 40 days and nights. The Jaitan Layar community and its surrounding attended the ceremony.

Before the ceremony, buffalos were slaughtered and the corpses were prepared. During the Tijak Tanah ceremonial rite, Aji's feet would be placed on the heads of buffalos, living and dead; and on human, living and dead. Then, covered with yellow cloth, Aji was accompanied to the nearby river where he bathed, performing the Mandi ke Tepian ceremonial rite. His feet would step on iron and on stone. The villagers, male and female, would then join him in the river. Afterwards, Aji was returned to his house while wearing lavish clothing. Accompanied by the song of Gajah Perwata orchestra and the sound of Sapu Jagat cannon, he was brought to the village yard where he laid on brightly coloured rugs. He was fed with betel leaves.

The party would then started in earnest. Food and drinks were free flowing, various performances and animal competition were held, men and women were dancing. The party continued for 7 days and nights. After the party, the decorations, utensils and musical instruments were then donated to the poor villagers.

Aji grew up and became the first Sultan of Kutai Kartanegara (1300–1325). During his inauguration, Erau ceremony was also conducted.

The Sultan married a beautiful princess named Putri Karang Melenu, who was also thought to be the descendant of God. The story goes that she was initially a small worm found by a Hulu Dusun officer in Melanti village near Mahakam River while he was chopping wood.

The officer saw a worm that kept circling the block of wood and gazing at him tearfully. The officer took it home with him, where it grew up day by day, bigger and bigger until it became a dragon. But the dragon never left the house. One night, the officer dreamt that he met a girl who was to become his daughter. She said, "Father, don’t be afraid, let me leave this house and the village, build me a stairwell so I can slither down". At once, he woke up and told his wife, Babu Jaruma.

The officer would then spend the days that followed building a stair made of lampong wood, with the steps made of bamboo and tied with lembiding roots. When he finished, he heard the girl's voice again, "As I step down to earth, come and follow me. Burn some sesame and sprinkle some yellow rice around me. When I slither down to the river and swim, follow my spume".

The dragon slithered down the stairs, to the river and swam seven times up and down the stream, came up the opposite river bank and slithered left and right three times when torrential rain came down, accompanied by strong winds and thunder.

The officer and his wife crossed the river with great difficulty. But then the weather cleared up and they saw that the river was filled with foam and rainbow-like lights were gleaming. The couple went closer to take a better look and saw a gong with a baby inside. The couple took the baby with them and brought her up as if she was their own. After three days, the baby's umbilical cord broke, she was then named Putri Karang Melenu.

When she grew up to become a beautiful young lady, the Gods united her with Aji, who was at the time already a Sultan. The couple had a son, which they named Aji Batara Agung Paduka Nira.

The legend of Putri Karang Melenu is perhaps the story behind the Mengulur Naga procession of the Erau ceremony.

== History ==
Every coronation of the Kutai Kartanegara Sultans, since the time that the first Sultan was inaugurated, had been commemorated with an Erau ceremony. Erau ceremonies then developed from being solely for the Sultan's coronation to a celebration commemorating the vesting of title to individuals for their outstanding service to the kingdom. The duration of the ceremony would depend upon the Kutai Palace's wealth, it ranged from 7 days to a maximum of 40 days continuously.

The Erau ceremonies were traditionally organised by the Kutai palace courtiers, who would invite the kingdom's community leaders. Arriving from all corners of the kingdom, the leaders would bring supplies of food, livestock, fruits, and also artists for entertainment. The Sultan and his courtiers would then provide free meals to the kingdom's citizens as a gesture of the Sultan's gratitude to the dedication of his people.

The last known traditional Erau ceremony was in 1965, for the commemoration of the Sultan Aji Pangeran Adipati Praboe Anoem Soerya Adiningrat coronation. The traditional Erau ceremony ended along with the end of the Kutai Kartanegara Sultanate reign, when its territory was converted into the autonomous region of Kutai Kartanegara (abbrev. Kukar) Regency.

== Modern Erau ==
In the effort of preserving the cultural traditions of Kutai, the bupati (taken from a Sanskrit word, which contemporarily means the holder of executive power of the local government) of Kukar Regency government, Drs. H. Achmad Dahlan, mandated that Erau be a biennial festival commemorating the foundation of the capital Tenggarong on 29 September 1782. This biennial festival was first held in 1971.

From the advice of Kukar's last Sultan, Sultan Aji Muhammad Parikesit, the district government is only allowed to exercise some traditional ceremonies, and not others such as the tijak kepala (literally step on head) and the vesting of titles.

Activities that are allowed are art and sport or agility performances, such as Menjamu Benua, Merangin Malam, Mendirikan Tiang Ayu, Upacara Penabalan, Pelas, Seluak Mudik, Mengulur Naga and Belibur. Traditional tribal ceremonies allowed was from the Dayak tribe, such as Papaer Maper, Kuangkay, Mumutn, Ngayau, Lemakan Balei, Uman Undad, Pasek Truit, Erau Anak. There are also the occasional Malay arts such as Tarsul and Badendang.

Erau festival, held every September, has now been included in the Indonesian national tourism calendar of events. It is no longer associated with cultural tradition of the Kukar Sultanate palace, but rather to showcase the arts and culture that exist and thrive across the regency.
