= Lamandau River =

Lamandau River Sungai Lamandau, Sungai Kotawaringin
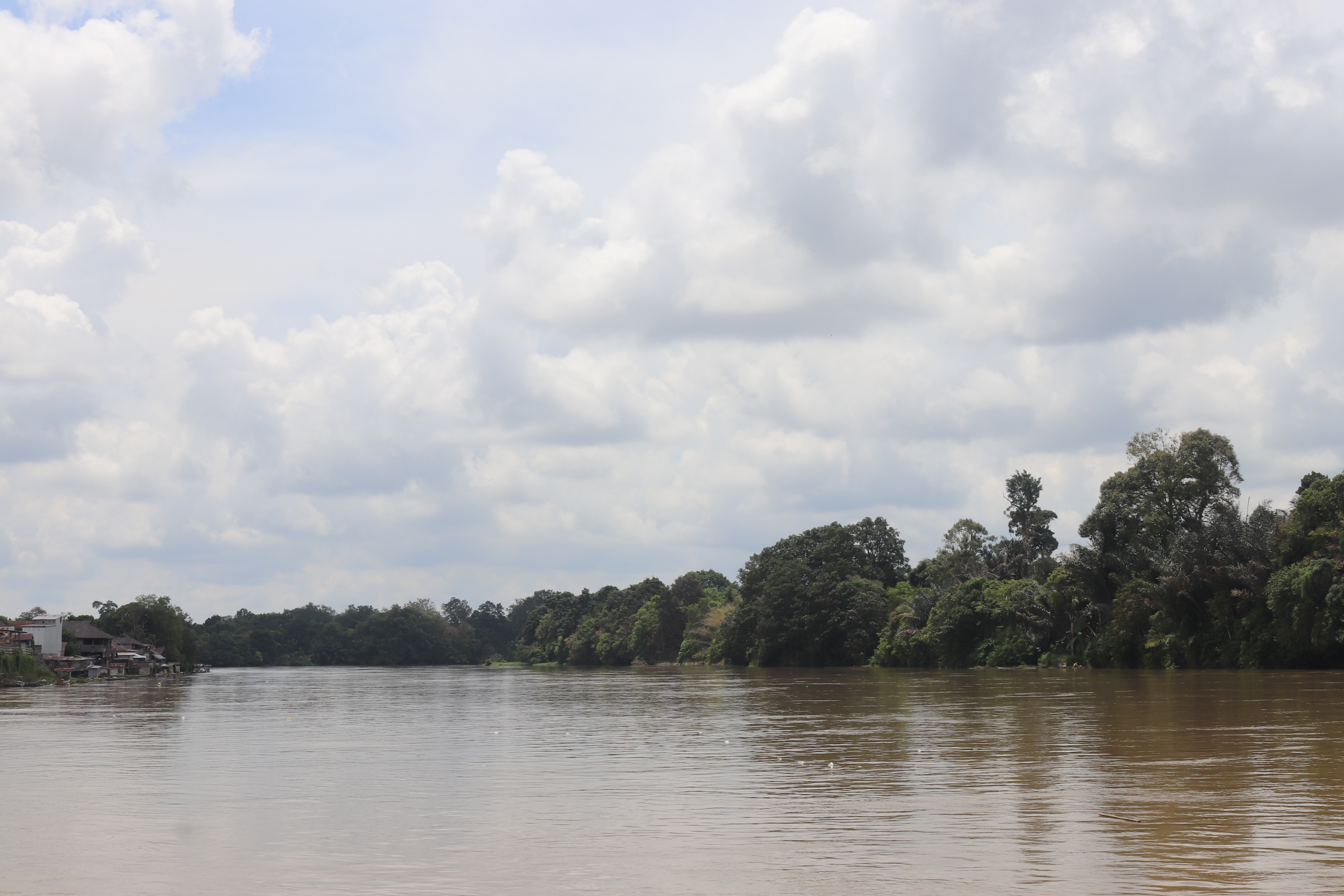

- River mouth location Lamandau River (Indonesia)

Location
- Country: Indonesia

Physical characteristics
- Source
  - location: Kalimantan
- Mouth
  - location: Java Sea
- Length: 300 km (190 mi)

Lamandau River (Indonesian: Sungai Lamandau) is a river of Kalimantan, southern-central Borneo, Indonesia. Downstream after passing the village of Nanga Bulik it becomes the Kotawaringin River.

The ancient town of Kotawaringin is located in the valley formed by the river and its tributary along with gold and gemstone mining areas. In the upper reaches of the tributary valley of Arut River the Pangkalan Bun town flourishes on its banks.

== Hydrology ==
Lamandau River flows through southern Central Kalimantan and Pangkalan Bun, discharging into the Java Sea near Kumai at 2°51′20″S 111°43′14″E. It is a major tributary of the Kotawaringin River, known by this name after its confluence below Naga Bulik village. Tributaries include the Arut River, where in its upper reaches the Pangkalan Bun town is located. While the lower reaches of the river are densely populated, the upper reaches have contiguous forest areas where Orangutans can be seen. Kotawaringin town to the west of the Lamandau River was the ancient capital of a Sultanate.

The catchment of the Lamandau River comprises the western district of Central Kalimantan and West-Kotawaringin. West Kotawaringin district has a population of 200,000 people constituted by Tuman Dayaks (about 33%) who are Christians. The capital of this district is Pangkalan Bun, which has a sub-district, a traditional area of the Dolang, close to the Kundangan city where 7000 Dayaks reside in about 100 longhouses spread over 19 villages.

Pangkalan Bun town is a waterfront town, which has a plywood manufacturing plant. Its fame is due to the mines nearby where gold and amethyst stones are extracted. In support of these mining activities, several shops selling diesel sets for use in mining have been set up. Another spin-off from the mines is the establishment of several gem stores in the town. The particularly popular item of sale is the five-set lucky stones of dark coloured amethysts, duly polished and made to shimmer for sale.

== Geography ==
Lamandau River

Climate chart (precipitation, max. and min. temperature)
J	F	M	A	M	J	J	A	S	O	N	D
198 24 21	270 26 21	305 24 23	339 25 22	282 26 23	207 25 22	118 25 21	132 26 21	66 26 22	147 27 22	386 24 22	329 24 21
- █ Average max. and min. temperatures in °C
- █ Precipitation totals in mm
Imperial conversion
J	F	M	A	M	J	J	A	S	O	N	D
7.8 75 70	11 79 70	12 75 73	13 77 72	11 79 73	8.1 77 72	4.6 77 70	5.2 79 70	2.6 79 72	5.8 81 72	15 75 72	13 75 70
- █ Average max. and min. temperatures in °F
- █ Precipitation totals in inches

The river flows in the mid-southern area of Borneo island with a predominantly tropical rainforest climate (designated as Af in the Köppen-Geiger climate classification). The annual average temperature in the area is 23 °C. The warmest month is October when the average temperature is around 24 °C, and the coldest is January, at 22 °C. The average annual rainfall is 2778 mm. The wettest month is November, with an average of 386 mm of rainfall, and the driest is September, with 66 mm of rainfall.

== People in the valley ==
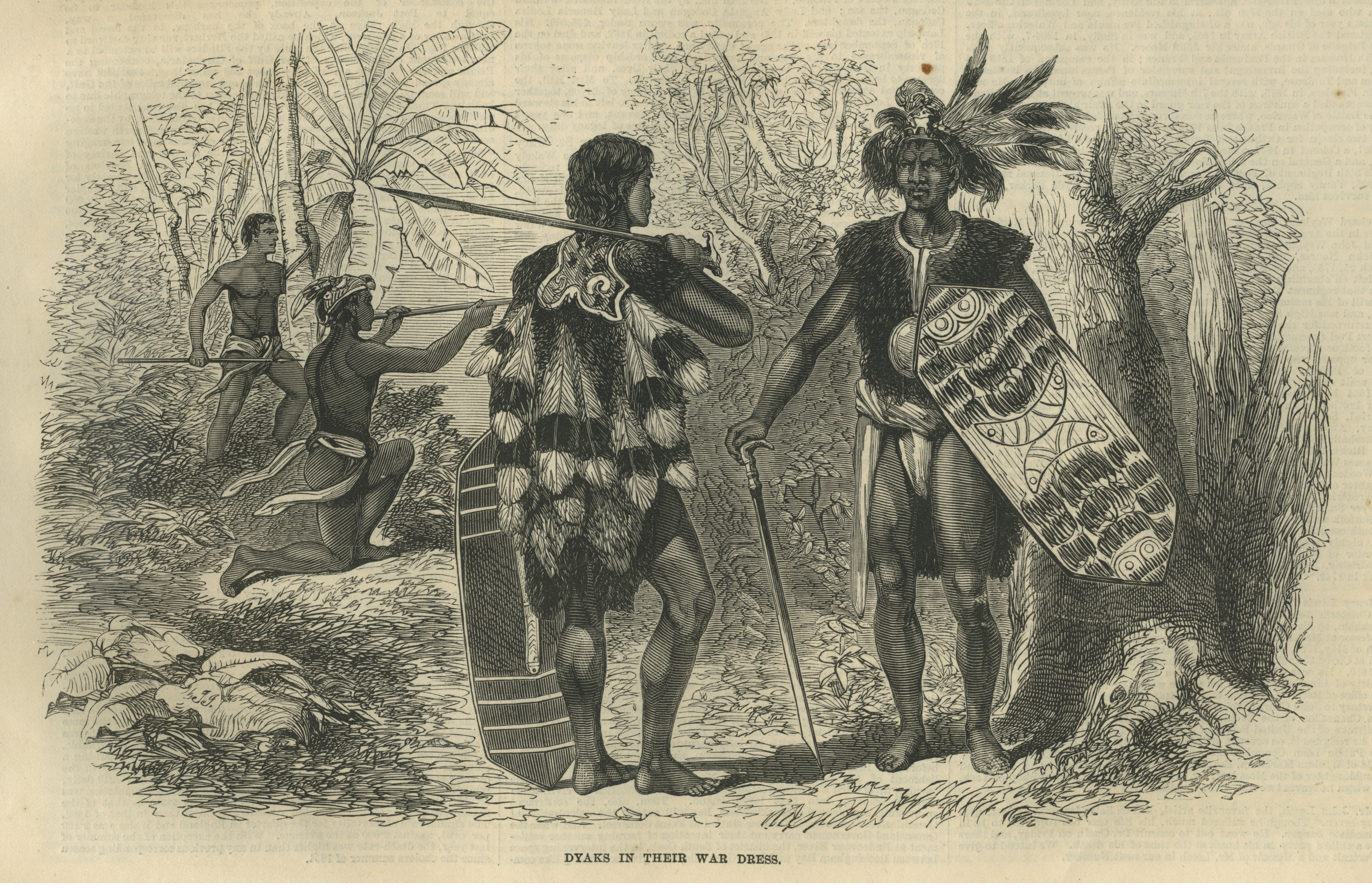
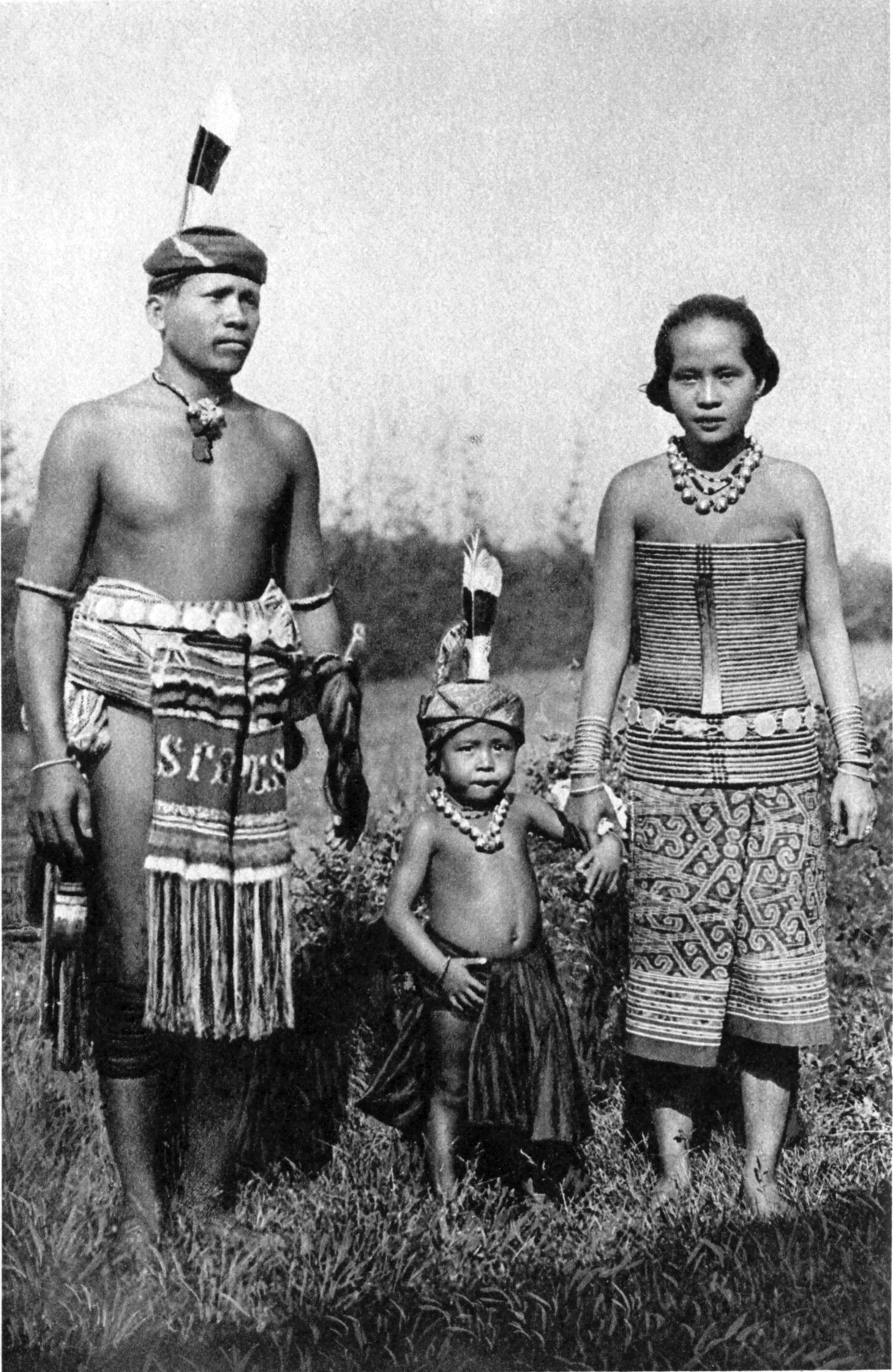
Left: Dayaks in their war dress. Right: A Dayak family.

The river valley is inhabited by the Dayak peoples, particularly the Tumon in the upper course of the river. The river is popular with tourists who take trips along the rivers by speedboats and traditional klotok boats to visit and experience the lives of the Dayaks. Buddhist influence has also been traced to the Lamandau River valley in Kotawaringin town. Buddhist statues with the god's name of Dewata or Mahatara have been found here.

== Agriculture ==
Much of the land between the Jelai-Bila River and the Lamandau River is developed by agriculture.

== Lamandau River Wildlife Reserve ==
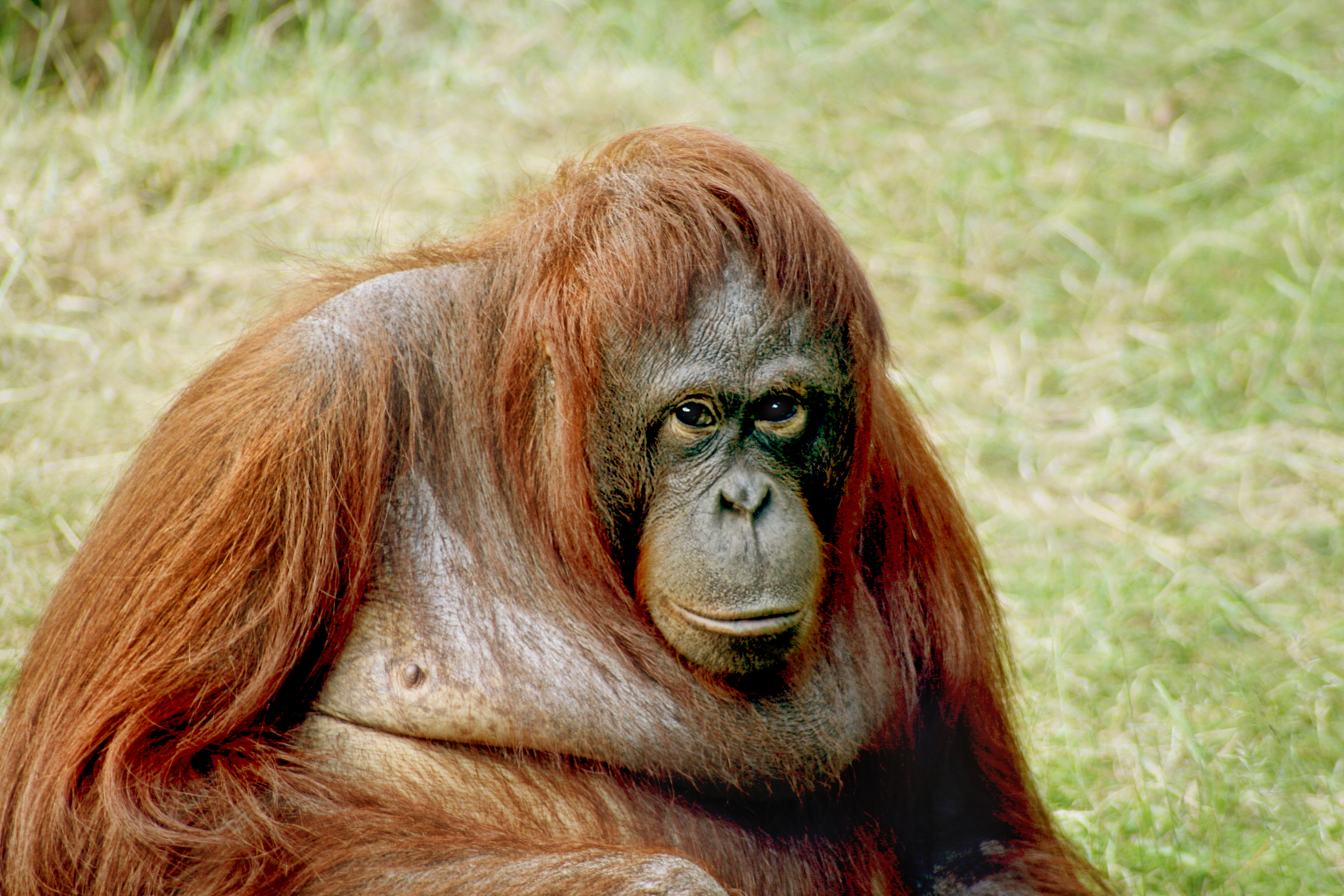
Bornean orangutan

The river flows through the 76,000-hectare Lamandau River Wildlife Reserve, in the unique primary forest in Borneo, which has many endangered species, including Bornean orangutans. Human exploitation in the area has led to the pollution of the Lamandau River from gold and zircon mining, illegal logging, and large-scale deforestation to create palm oil plantations. However, an awareness campaign has been initiated by NGOs to preserve the Orangutans in the park and also introduce agricultural practices compatible with forest preservation actions.

Within the park, there are two camps namely, Camp Siswoyo and Camp I, which are maintained by the Orangutan Foundation International (OFI). They are close to Pangkalan Bun and Pasir Pajang, on its eastern border. The infrastructure facilities in these camps have been improved here since September 2003, with funding provided by the Orangutan Foundation, United Kingdom. A guard post has also been established to prevent incursions into the forest or the river by illegal loggers who had in the past created large-scale destruction of the forests in the region.

== See also ==
- List of drainage basins of Indonesia
- List of rivers of Indonesia
- List of rivers of Kalimantan
