= Sekonyer River =

Sekonyer River Sungai Sekonyer, Sungai Sikunir, Soengai Sikoenir, Soengai Sikvenir
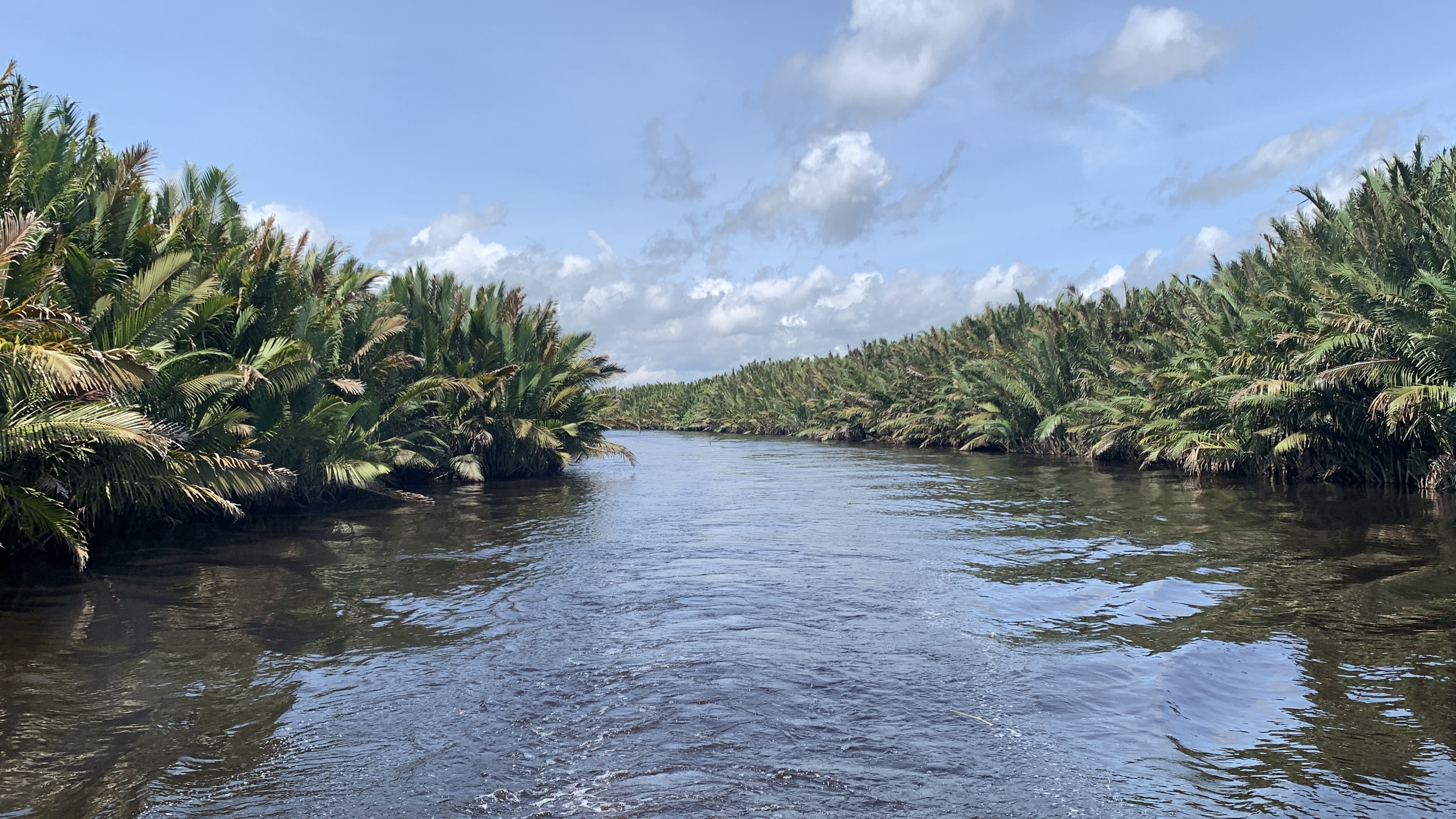
- Sekonyer river

- Location of the river mouth Sekonyer River (Indonesia)

Location
- Country: Indonesia

Physical characteristics
- Mouth
  - coordinates: 2.776942°S 111.713683°E

Basin features
- River system: Kumai River

Sekonyer is a river in southern Borneo, Central Kalimantan province, Indonesia, about 700 km northeast of the capital Jakarta.

== Hydrology ==
It is a tributary of the Kumai River and is fed by the Camp Leakey River.

== Ecology ==
Part of the river traverses the Tanjung Puting National Park. Travel on the river is often done by klotok, an Indonesian riverboat. The river includes an orangutan habitat. The river is brown and murky. Gold mining takes place along it.

== Geography ==
The river flows in the southern central area of Kalimantan with a predominantly tropical rainforest climate (designated as Af in the Köppen-Geiger climate classification). The annual average temperature in the area is 22 °C. The warmest month is April when the average temperature is around 24 °C, and the coldest is December, at 21 °C. The average annual rainfall is 2778 mm. The wettest month is November, with an average of 386 mm of rainfall, and the driest is September, with 66 mm of rainfall.

Sekonyer River

Climate chart (precipitation, max. and min. temperature)
| J | F | M | A | M | J | J | A | S | O | N | D |
| 198 23 20 | 270 24 20 | 305 22 22 | 339 26 21 | 282 24 22 | 207 23 21 | 118 22 21 | 132 26 20 | 66 26 21 | 147 24 21 | 386 23 21 | 329 22 20 |
- █ Average max. and min. temperatures in °C
- █ Precipitation totals in mm
Imperial conversion
| J | F | M | A | M | J | J | A | S | O | N | D |
| 7.8 73 68 | 11 75 68 | 12 72 72 | 13 79 70 | 11 75 72 | 8.1 73 70 | 4.6 72 70 | 5.2 79 68 | 2.6 79 70 | 5.8 75 70 | 15 73 70 | 13 72 68 |
- █ Average max. and min. temperatures in °F
- █ Precipitation totals in inches

== See also ==
- List of drainage basins of Indonesia
- List of rivers of Indonesia
- List of rivers of Kalimantan
