= Lamandau Nature Reserve =

Nature reserve in Borneo, Indonesia

- Location within Kalimantan
- Location: Kalimantan, Borneo, Indonesia
- Coordinates: 2°47′13″S 111°22′05″E
- Area: 761 km^{2} (294 sq mi)

The Lamandau Nature Reserve is found in Borneo, Indonesia. This site has an area of 761 km^{2} (294 sq mi). It is home to several Bornean orangutans (Pongo pygmaeus). It is this reserve that rehabilitates and orphan orangutans are released into by the Orangutan Foundation. (McConkey, 2005)

The number of endangered orangutans is currently around 500, but that number is gradually growing as the Lamandau Nature Reserve implements a program of rehabilitation and release of orangutans into the natural environment.

The Borneo Orangutan Survival (BOS) Foundation is the world’s largest orangutan conservation organisation. Through global partnerships they are changing the downward trajectory for Bornean orangutans and their depleting rainforests.

== See also ==
- Lamandau River
