= Tanjung Puting =

National park in Indonesia

Tanjung Puting National Park
- IUCN category II (national park)
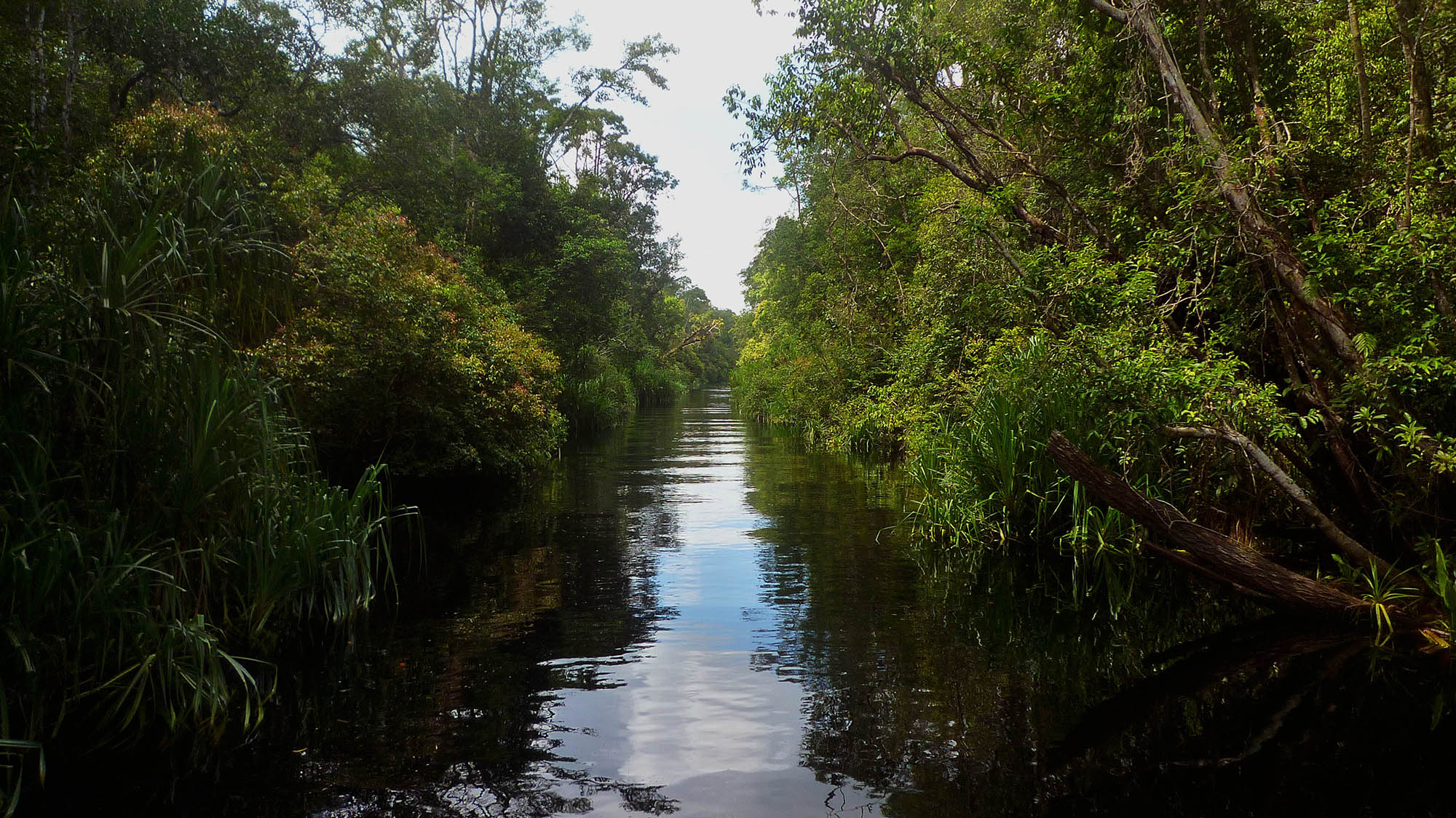
- Vegetation at Sekonyer river.

- Location within Central Kalimantan Location within Kalimantan Location within Indonesia
- Location: West Kotawaringin Regency, Kalimantan, Indonesia
- Nearest city: Pangkalan Bun
- Coordinates: 3°03′S 111°57′E
- Area: 4,150 km^{2} (1,600 sq mi)
- Established: 1982
- Visitors: 2,046 (in 2007)
- Governing body: Ministry of Forestry

Ramsar Wetland
- Official name: Tanjung Puting National Park
- Designated: 12 November 2013
- Reference no.: 2192

Tanjung Puting National Park (Indonesian: Taman Nasional Tanjung Puting) is a national park in Indonesia located along the Sekonyer River in the southeast part of West Kotawaringin Regency in the Indonesian province of Central Kalimantan (Central Borneo). The nearest main town is the capital of the Regency, Pangkalan Bun. The park is famous for its orangutan conservation.

== Geography ==
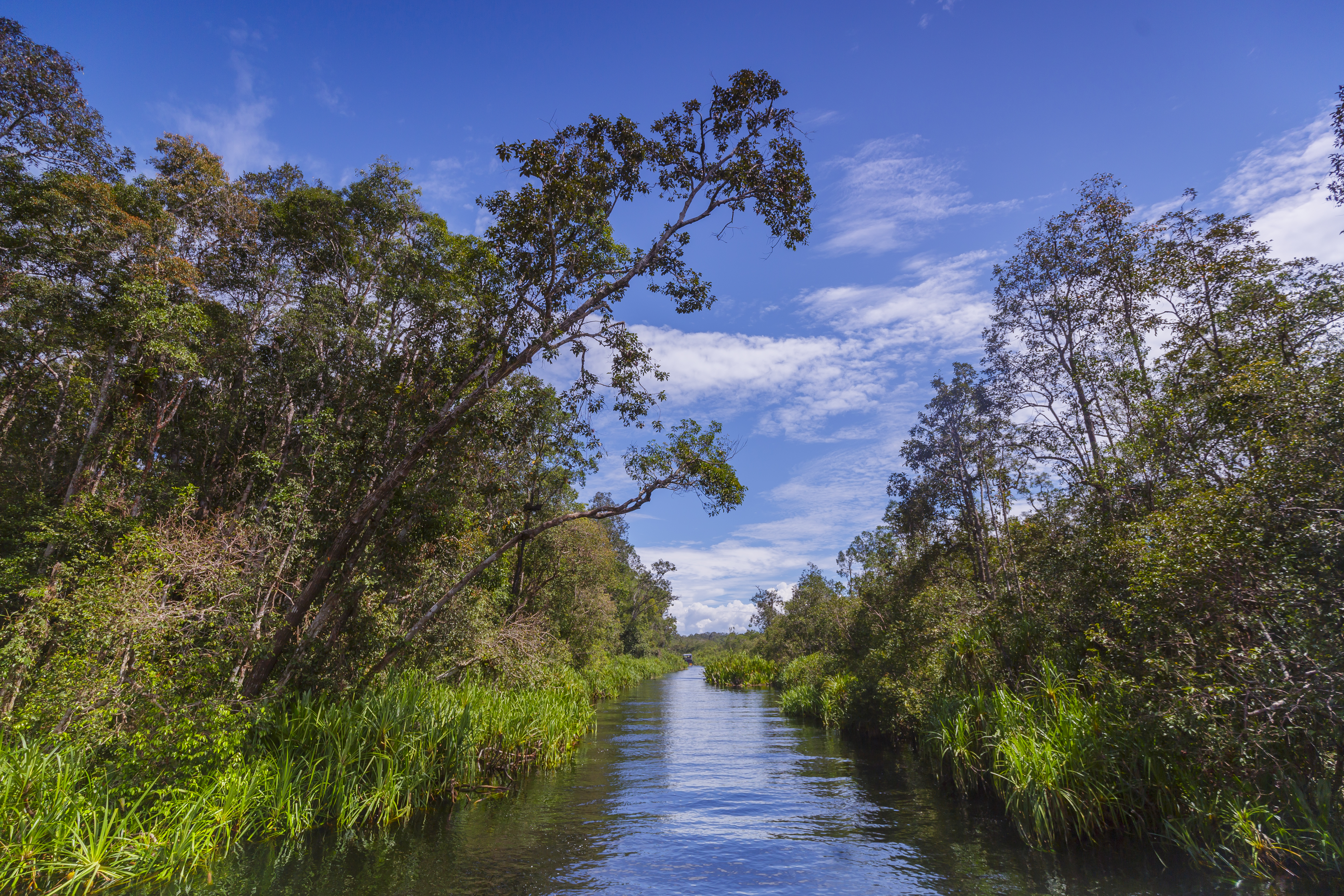
Sekonyer River

The park is composed of 416,040 hectares of dryland dipterocarp forest, peat swampforest, heath forest, mangrove and coastal beach forest, and secondary forest. The park may be accessed from Kumai by speedboat along the Kumai River and then the Sekonyer River to Camp Leakey, a journey that takes about 1 hour and 30 minutes at best. The Kumai River forms the northern border of the park. Beyond that the peat forest has been removed to make way for oil palm plantations.

Despite being a protected national park, approximately 65% of the park's primary forest is degraded. It is the loss of natural habitat that is the greatest threat to the wildlife. Friends of National Parks Foundation is an Indonesian NGO that has been working to restore the habitat in the Pasalat and Beguruh regions of the park since 1997. It also operates a conservation education centre in Pasalat.

Four research centers have been established within the park for the study and rehabilitation of orangutans and other primates. Camp Leakey, founded in 1971 with assistance from the Leakey Foundation, was the first of these centers. It was here where Dr. Birutė Galdikas began her career studying the behavior of rescued and orphaned orangutans that were reintroduced into the wild. Her research was highlighted as the cover article of National Geographic in October 1975. Dr. Galdikas was considered one of the world’s leading experts on orangutan behaviour and was the founder and president of the Orangutan Foundation International.

Orangutan Foundation runs Pondok Ambung Tropical Forest Research Station, supporting Indonesian and international research students. This national park facility has been developed and maintained by Orangutan Foundation and provides facilities to study the park’s diverse flora and fauna. Orangutan Foundation have been awarding small research grants to individual students for many years, with a focus on supporting Indonesian students.

== Ecology ==
The park was set aside in the 1930s by the Dutch colonial government for the protection of the orangutans and proboscis monkey, and was designated as a UNESCO Biosphere Reserve in 1977 and a national park in 1982. It has been recognised as an Important Bird Area (IBA) by BirdLife International.

In addition to orangutans and proboscis monkeys, the park is also home to gibbons, macaques, clouded leopards, sun bears, wild boars, porcupines, and sambar deer. The park also features many reptiles, including crocodiles, monitor lizards, and pythons, birds, including hornbills and kingfishers, and insects, such as the giant Bornean butterfly. The Pondok Ambung Tropical Forest Research Station was established in 2005 for the study of all wild species found in the park.

Today Tanjung Puting National Park is a popular ecotourism destination, with many local tour companies offering multi-day boat tours to view wildlife and visit the research centers. The park was home to 105,000 people as of 1997. The park was heavily damaged by fires in 1997 and 1998, and today remains threatened by illegal logging, illegal mining, and forest clearing for agricultural uses.

Conservation efforts by Indonesian NGO Friends of the National Parks Foundation is leading towards a slow but progressive reforestation of damaged areas. Their reforestation work has seen the planting of thousands of saplings in the area to recreate habitat for the endemic wildlife in the area.

=== Gallery ===
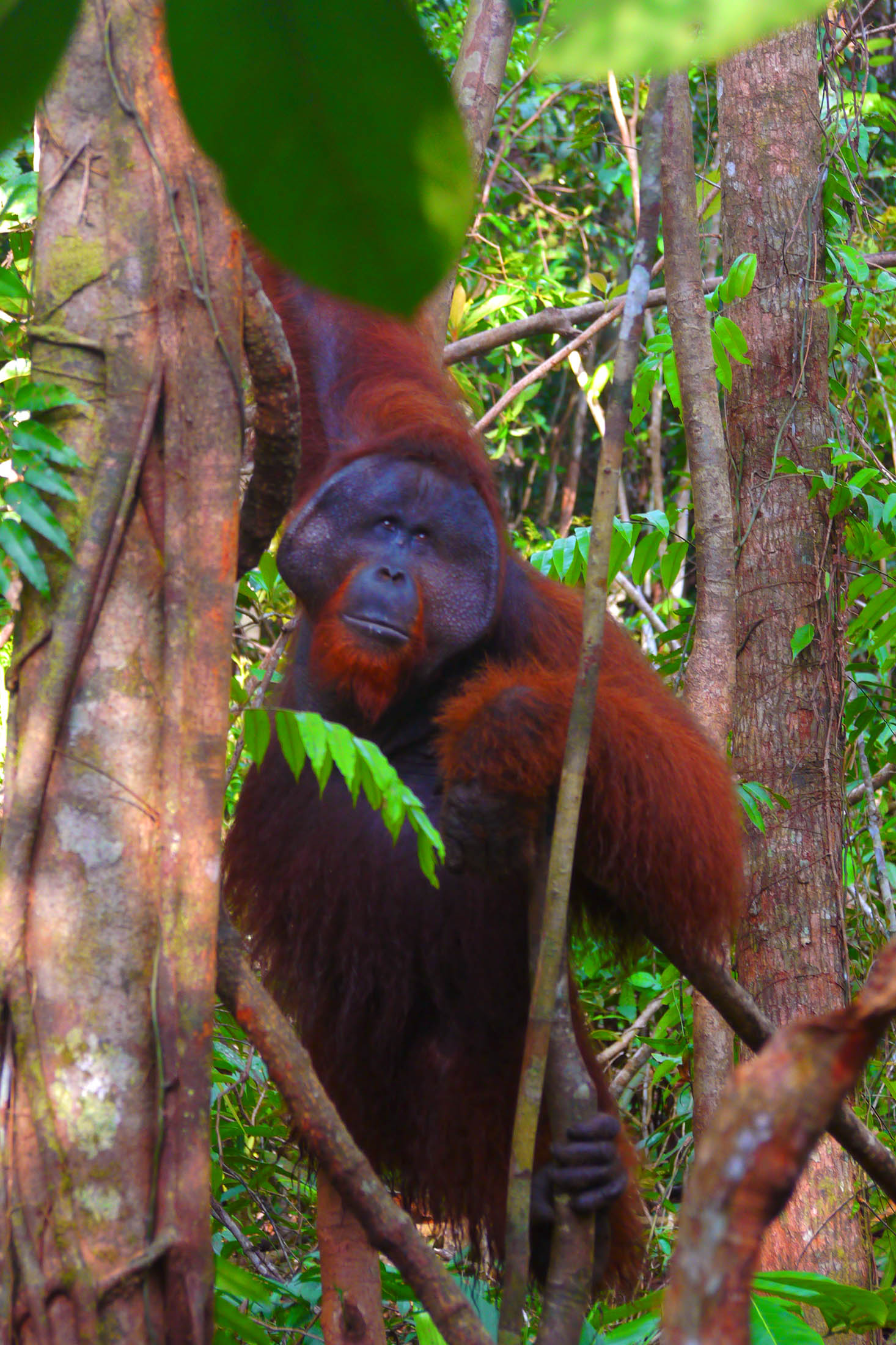
Male orangutan (Pongo pygmaeus) at Camp Leakey rehabilitation center

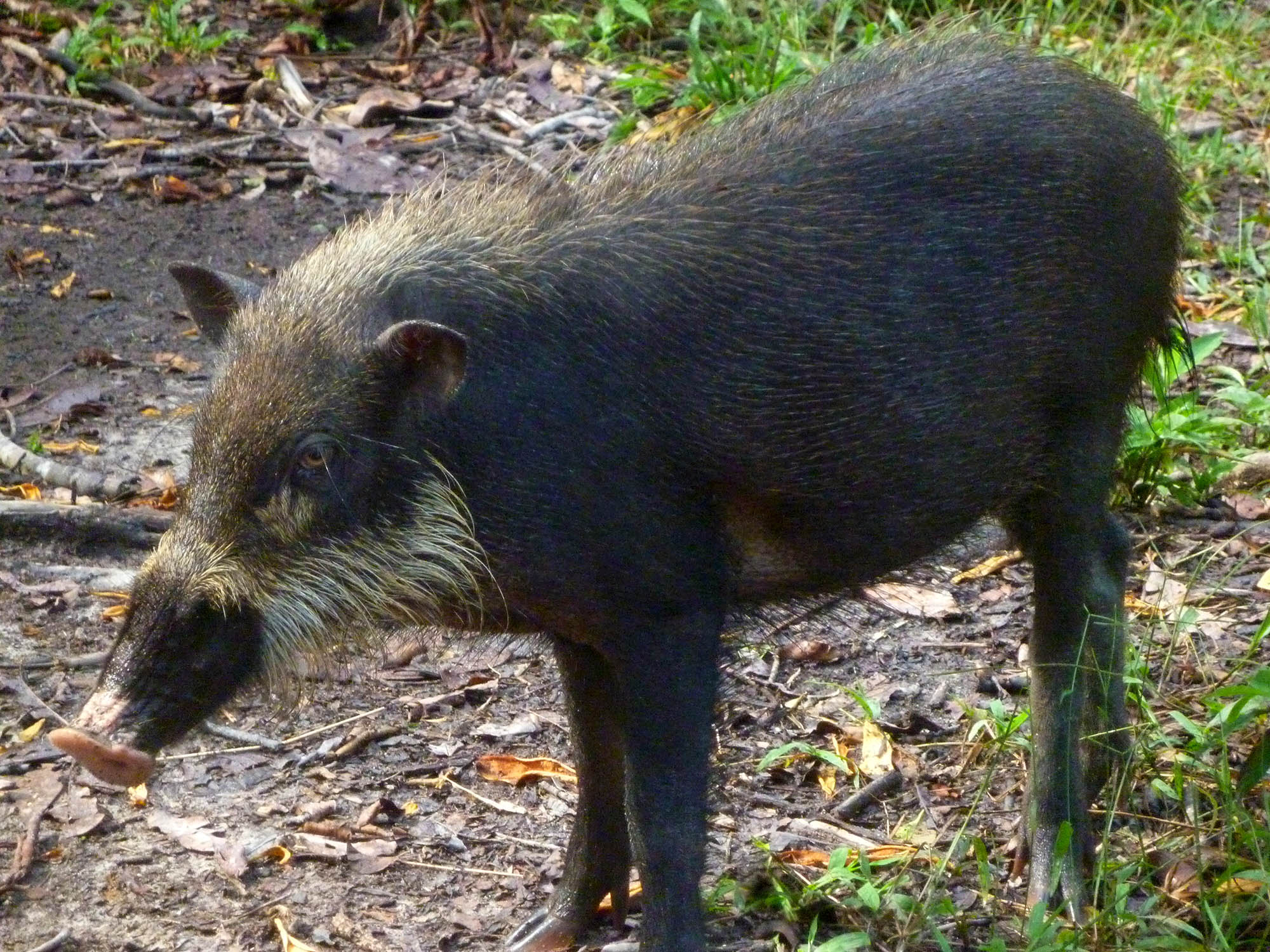
Bornean bearded pig (Sus barbatus) endemic to the Philippines, Sumatra and Borneo

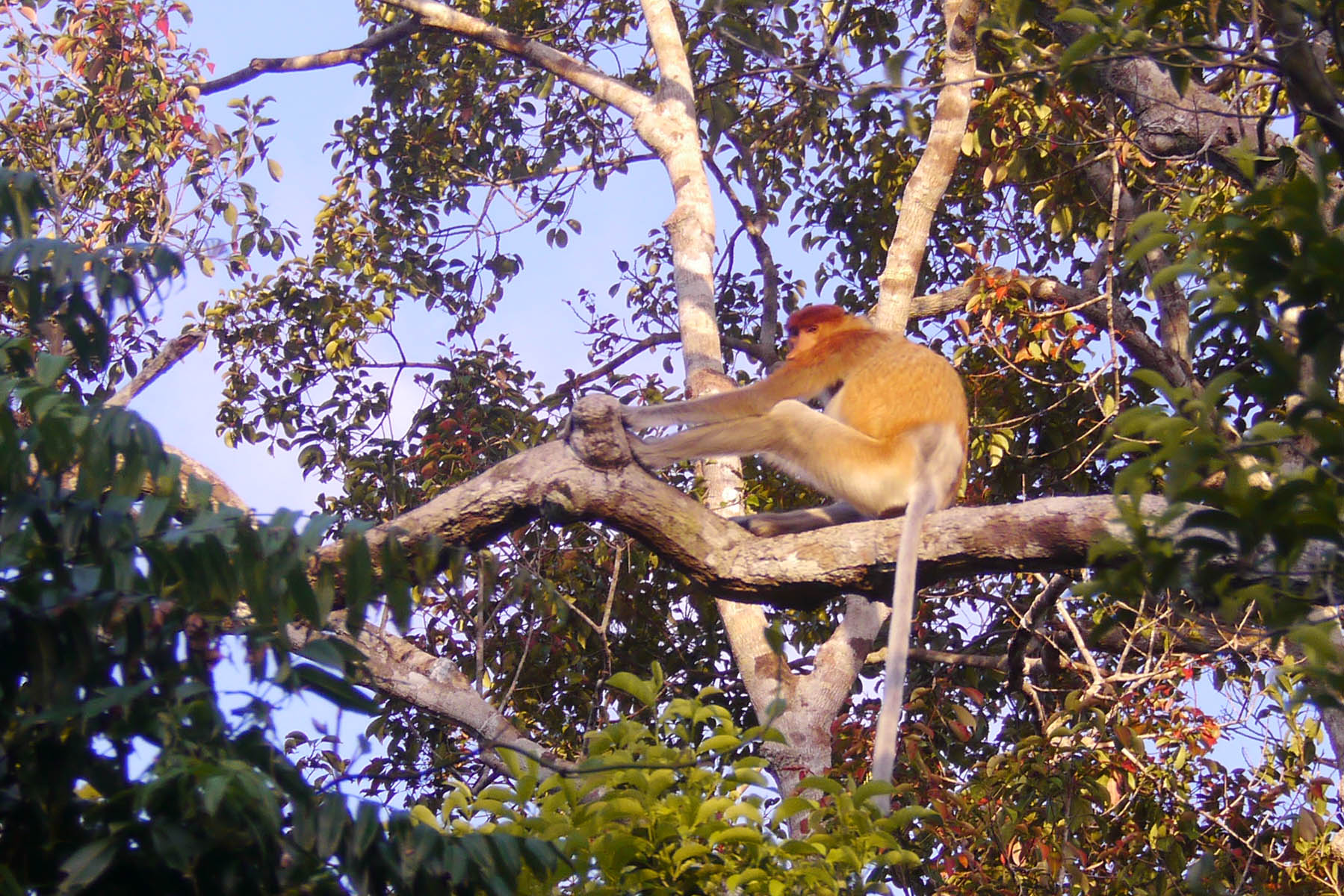
Female proboscis monkey (Nasalis larvatus)

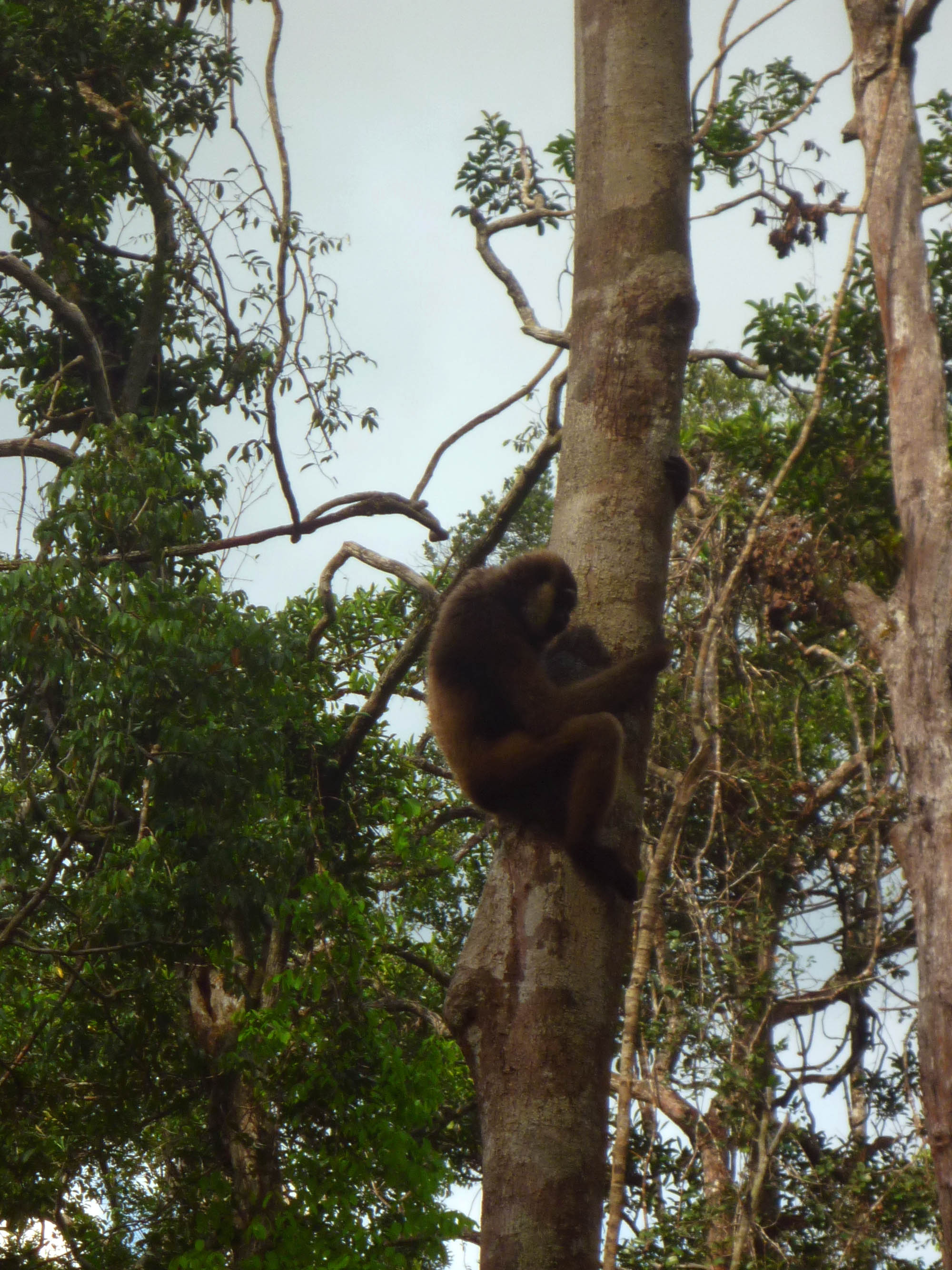
Bornean white-bearded gibbon (Hylobates albibarbis), endemic to the south of Borneo

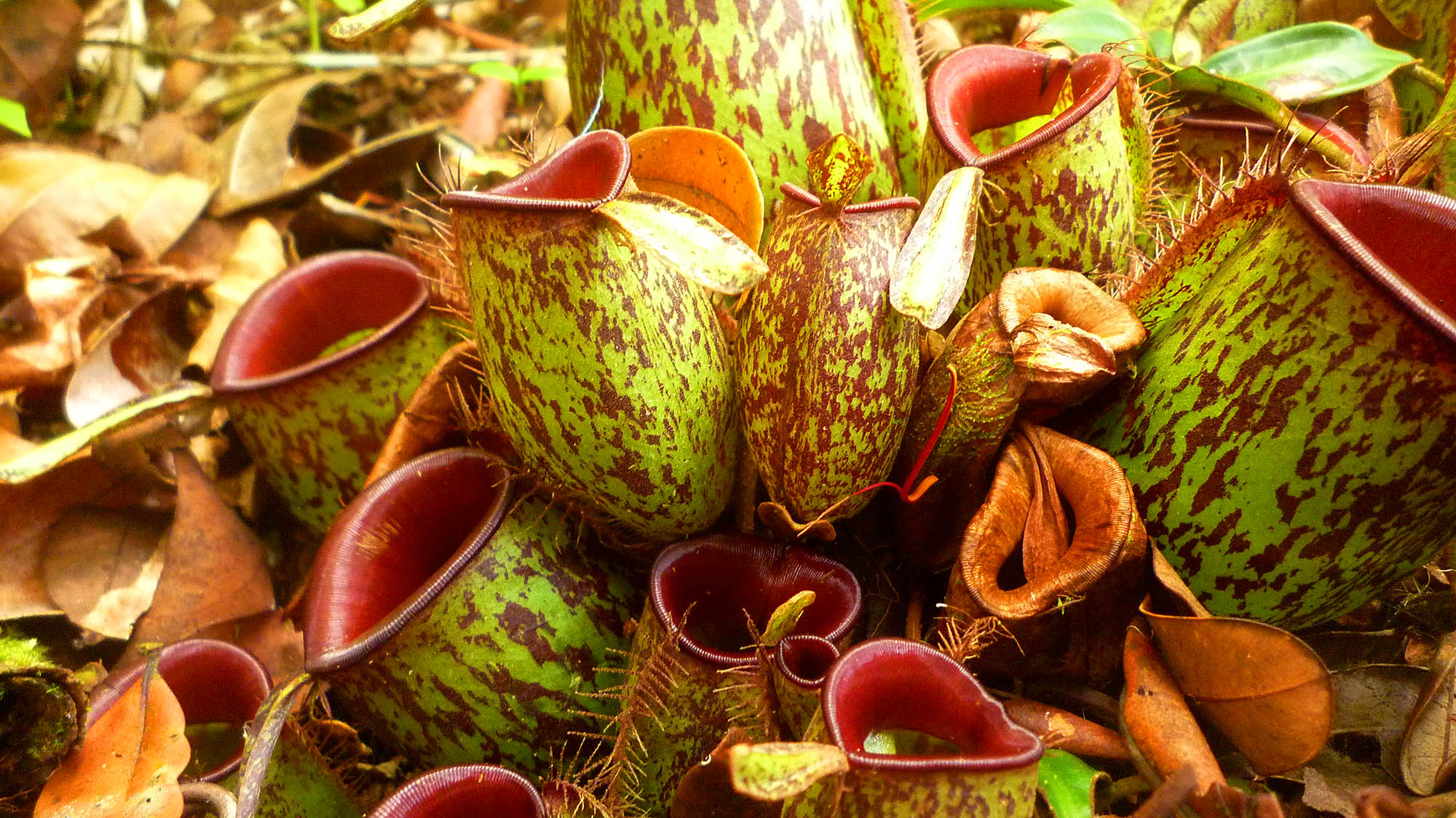
Pitcher plant (Nepenthes ampullaria)

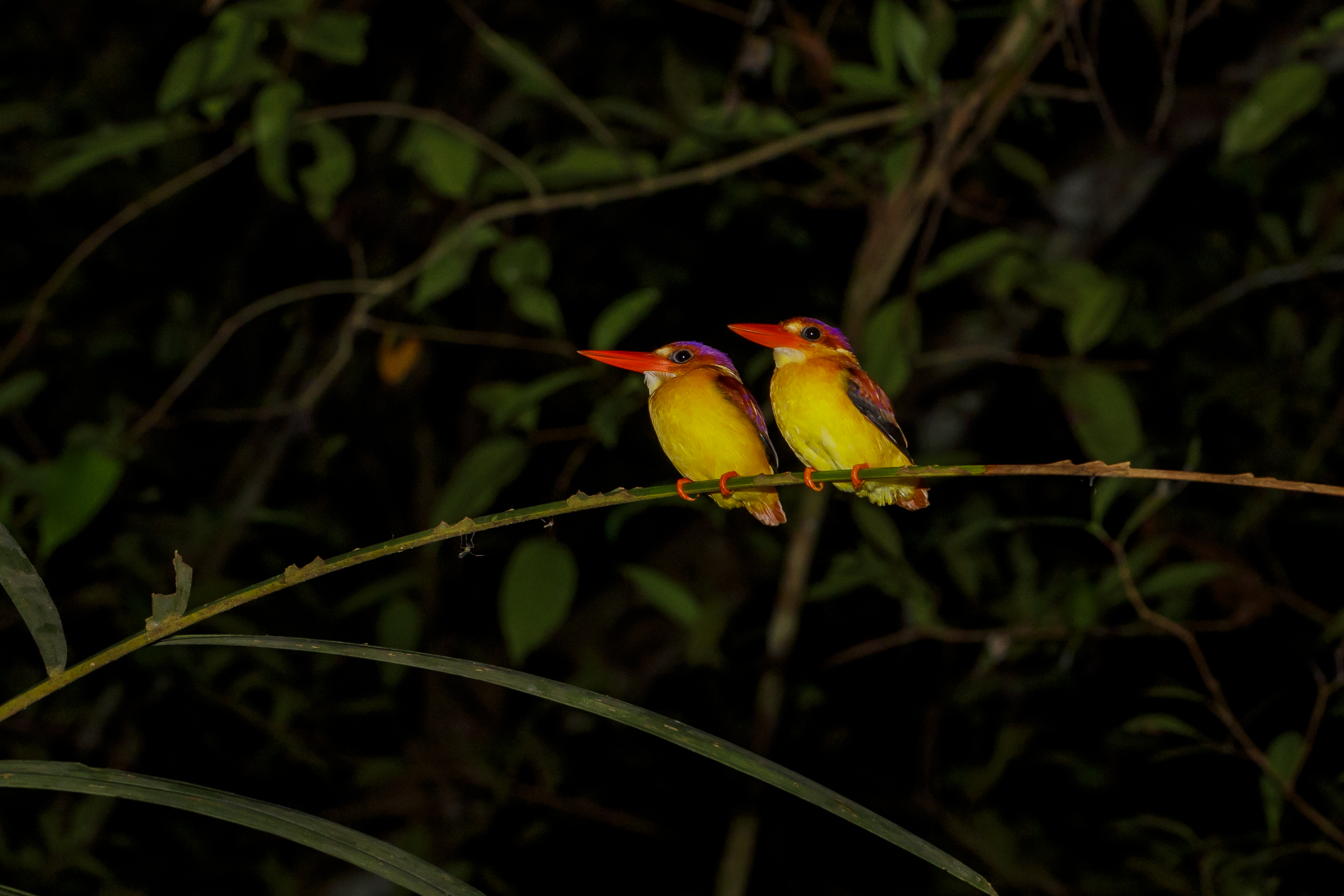
Oriental dwarf kingfisher (Ceyx erithaca)

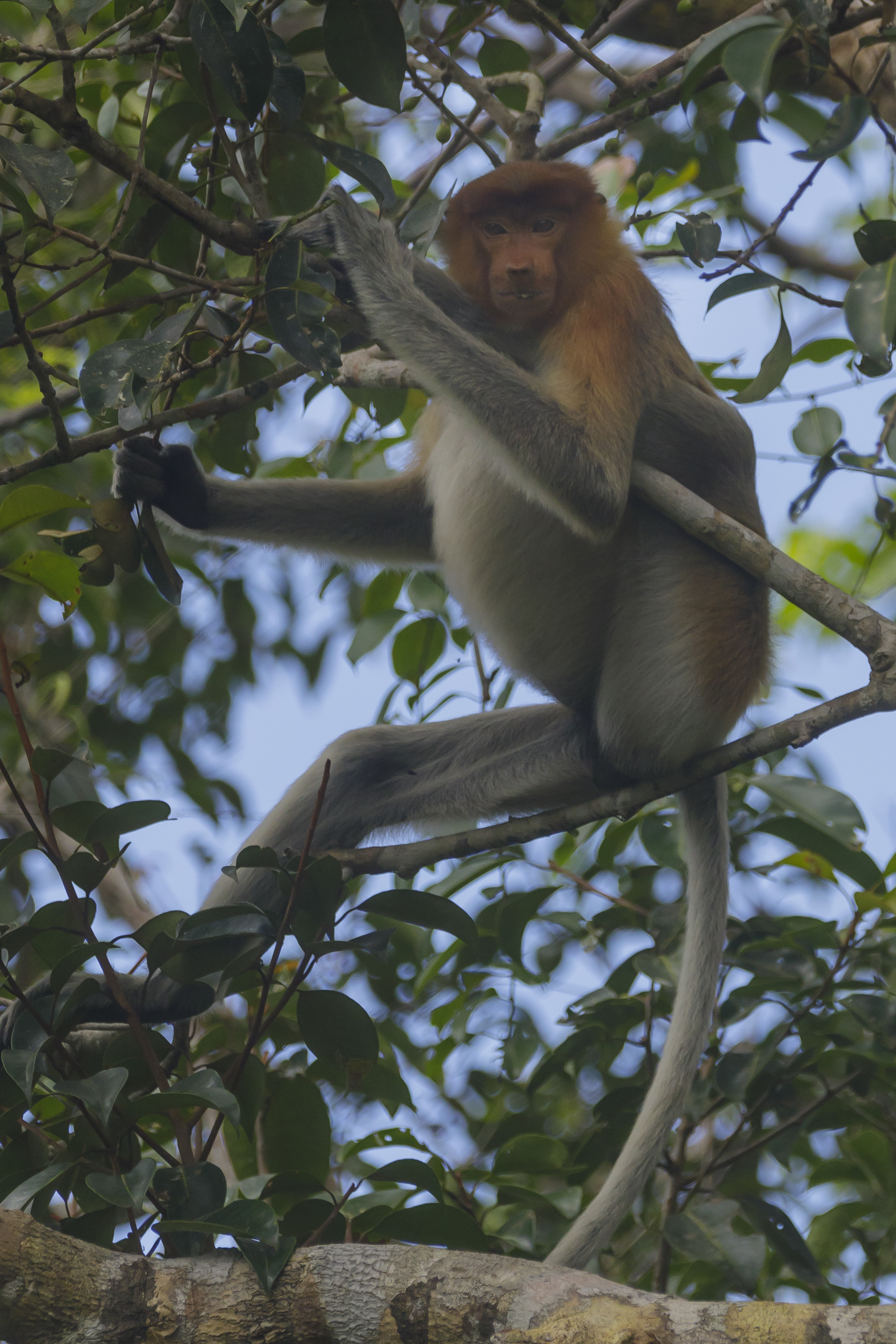
proboscis monkey (Nasalis larvatus)

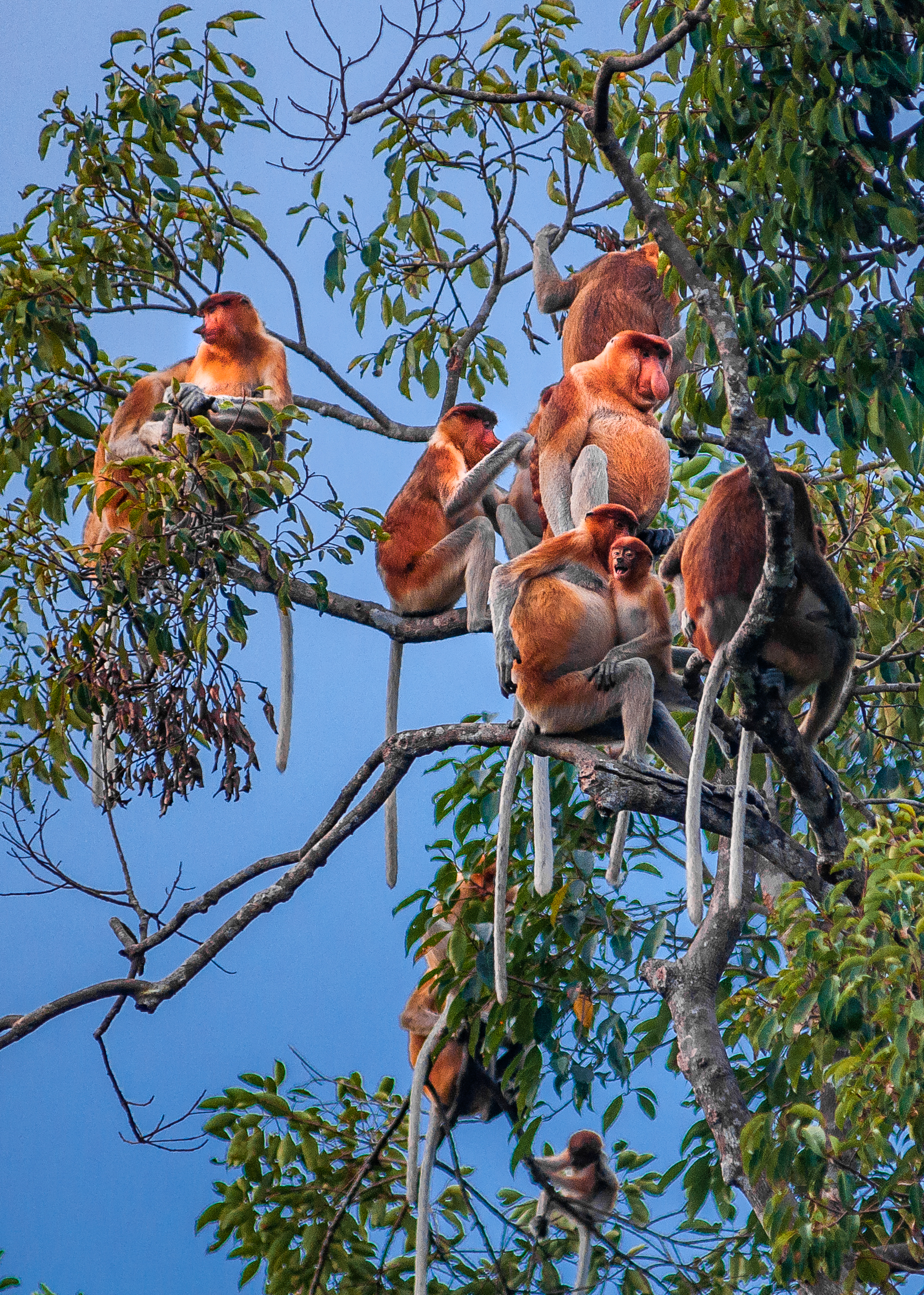
