= Kumai River =

Kumai River Sungai Kumai, Soengai Koemai
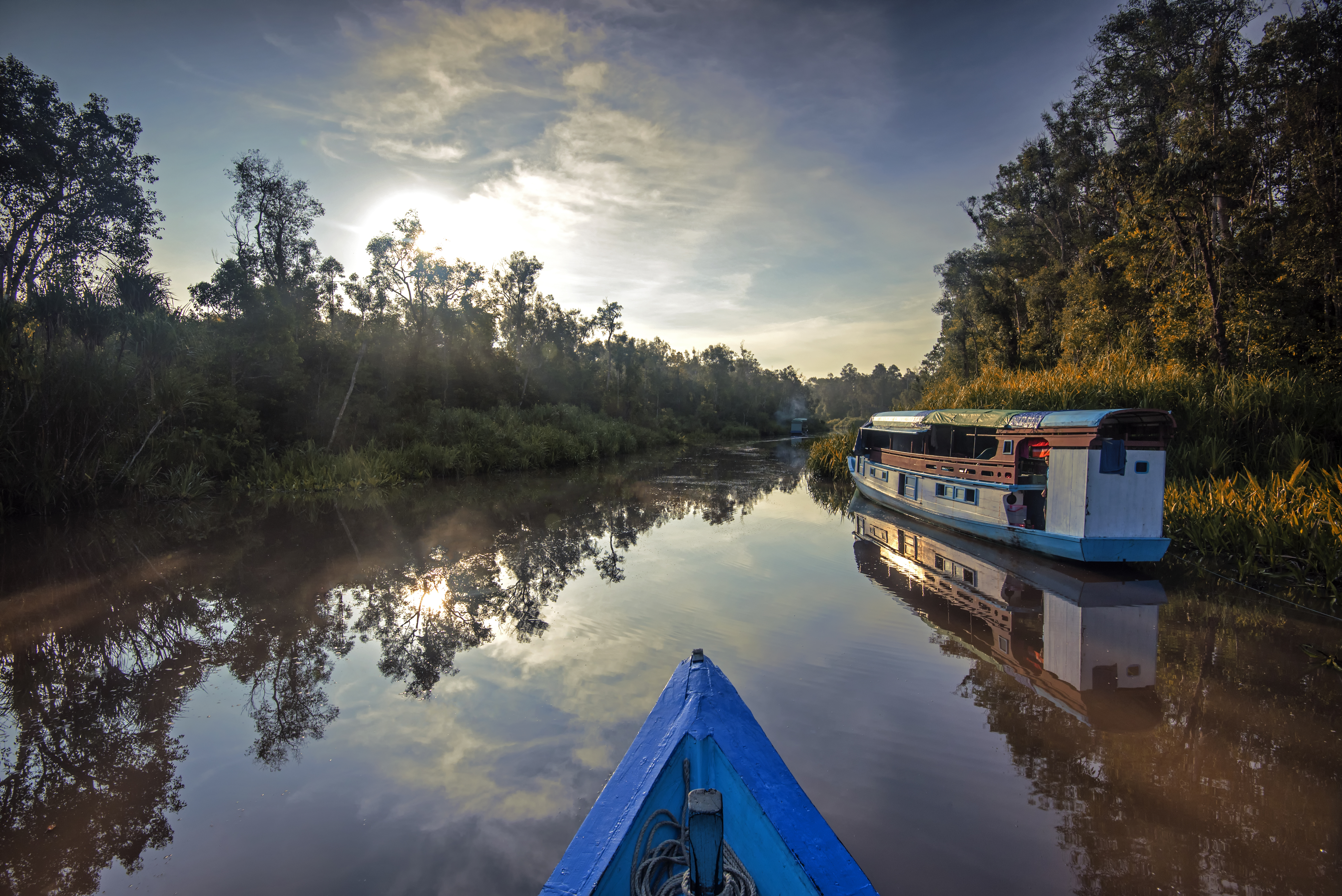
- Sunrise at Kumai River

- Location within Kalimantan

Location
- Country: Indonesia

Physical characteristics
- Source
  - location: Central Kalimantan
- Mouth
  - location: Java Sea
  - coordinates: 2.937456°S 111.732323°E
- Length: 179 kilometres (111 mi)

The Kumai River is a river of Central Kalimantan province, Borneo island, Indonesia.

== Location ==
The Kumai River originates in the Schwaner Mountains and flows south for 179 kilometres (111 mi) to the Java Sea. It empties into Kumai Bay. The bay has a mud bottom that gives a good anchorage in a depth of 4 to 6 fathoms (24 to 36 ft; 7.3 to 11.0 m). The river is navigable by vessels with a draft of 2 metres (6 ft 7 in) up to the village of Kumai on its right bank, 13 miles (21 km) from the entrance to the bay, and for 15 miles (24 km) further upstream. The depth at Kumai, a small river port with a government station and a landing pier at the custom house, is 11 metres (36 ft). Kumai Port is in West Kotawaringin Regency, 30 kilometres (19 mi) from the capital, Pangkalan Bun, and is used for the export of palm oil produced in the province.

== Environment ==
Water volumes vary during the year, with the highest volumes during the Northwest Monsoon. At some times of year, the river contains relatively little mud. The river shows traces of salt water as high as 37 kilometres (23 mi) upstream. The river runs through tropical lowland forest for most of its length. Near its estuary, the vegetation is mainly nypa and mangrove.

The peat forest surrounding the Kumai River suffered from droughts and fires in 1982–83 and again in 1997–98. The Tanjung Puting Park, about half of which is peat swamp forest, is famous for a population of about 4000 orangutans. It is accessed from Kumai by speedboat down the Kumai River and then up the Sekonyer River to Camp Leakey, a journey that takes about 1.5 hours. The Kumai River forms the northern border of the Tanjung Puting park. Beyond that, the peat forest has been removed to make way for oil palm plantations.

== See also ==
- List of drainage basins of Indonesia

== Sources ==
- Gooch, Frederick (2011-06-14), Shoot on Sight, Xlibris Corporation, ISBN 978-1-4568-9984-4
- Payne, Junaidi; Prudente, J. Cede (2008), Orang-utans: Behaviour, Ecology and Conservation, New Holland Publishers, ISBN 978-1-84537-928-5
- Phillipps, Quentin; Phillipps, Karen (2016-05-10), Phillipps' Field Guide to the Mammals of Borneo and Their Ecology: Sabah, Sarawak, Brunei, and Kalimantan, Princeton University Press, ISBN 978-0-691-16941-5
- Prostar Sailing Directions 2005 Borneo, Jawa, Sulawesi and Nusa Tenggara Enroute, ProStar Publications, 1 January 2005, p. 240, ISBN 978-1-57785-654-2
- Tan, Khee Giap; Merdikawati, Nurina; Amri, Mulya; Berger, Blake Harley (2015-09-08), 2014 Annual Competitiveness Analysis and Development Strategies for Indonesian Provinces, World Scientific, ISBN 978-981-4730-43-3
- Tomascik, Tomas; Mah, Anmarie; Nontji, Anugerah; Moosa, Mohammad Kasim (2013-12-13), The Ecology of the Indonesian Seas Part Two, Tuttle Publishing, ISBN 978-1-4629-0503-4
- United States. Hydrographic Office (1916), H.O. Pub
- Welman, Frans (2013-08-01), Borneo Trilogy Brunei: Vol 1, Booksmango, ISBN 978-616-222-235-1
