= Arut River =

River in Indonesia

Coordinates: 2.7191°S 111.5781°E

Arut River Sungai Arut, Soengai Aroet
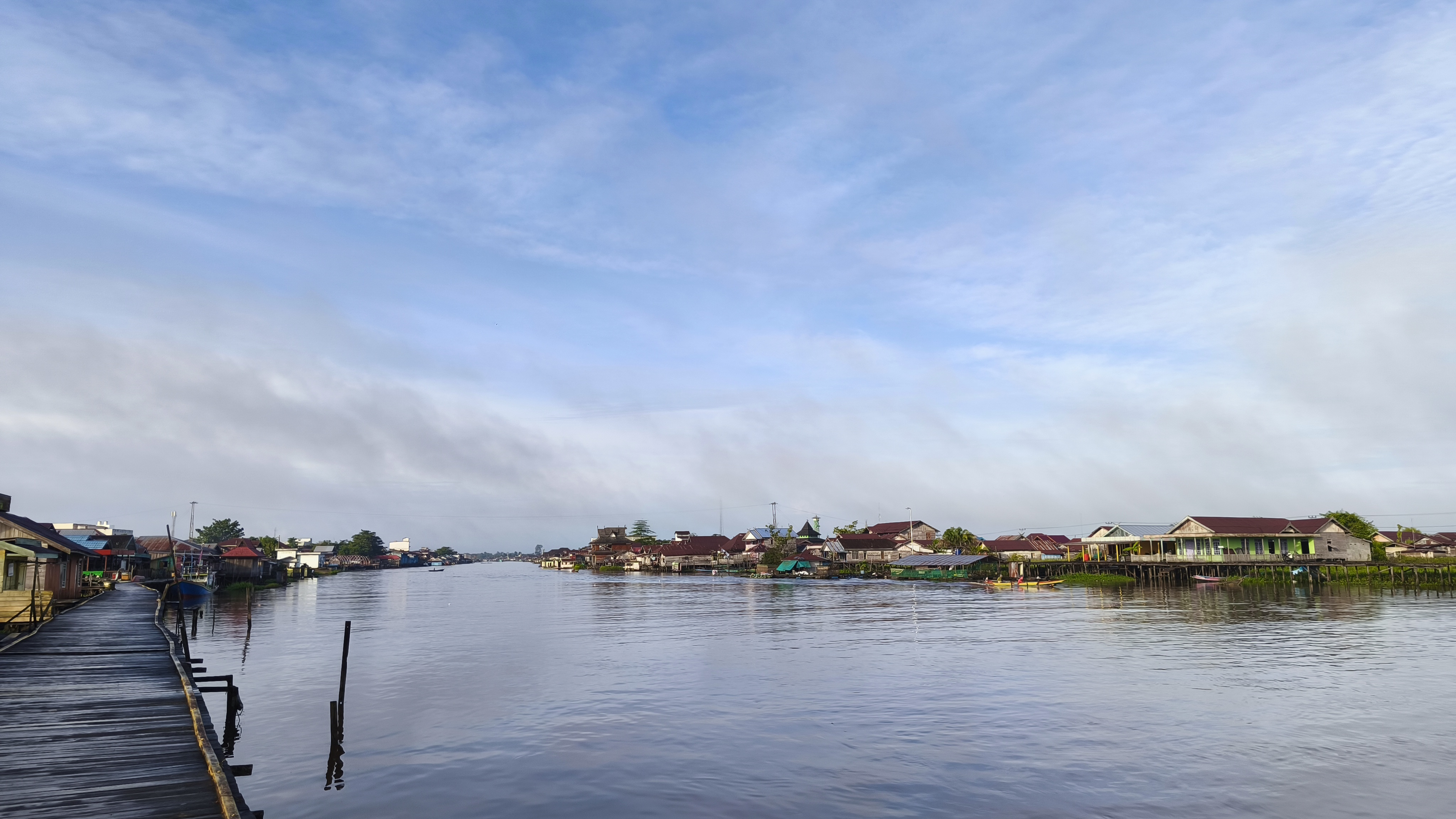
- Arut River in Pangkalan Bun City

- Location of river mouth Arut River (Indonesia)

Location
- Country: Indonesia
- Province: Central Kalimantan

Physical characteristics
- Source
  - location: West Kotawaringin Regency
- Mouth: Lamandau River

Arut River is a river in the province of Kalimantan Tengah, island of Borneo, Indonesia, about 700 km northeast of the capital Jakarta. It is a tributary of the Lamandau River. The river flows through the north side of Pangkalan Bun town.

== Geography ==
The river flows in the southern area of Kalimantan with a predominantly tropical rainforest climate (designated as Af in the Köppen-Geiger climate classification). The annual average temperature in the area is 24 °C. The warmest month is October, when the average temperature is around 24 °C, and the coldest is July, at 22 °C. The average annual rainfall is 2778 mm. The wettest month is November, with an average of 570 mm of rainfall, and the driest is September, with 66 mm of rainfall.

== See also ==
- List of drainage basins of Indonesia
- List of rivers of Indonesia
- List of rivers of Kalimantan
