= Klotok =

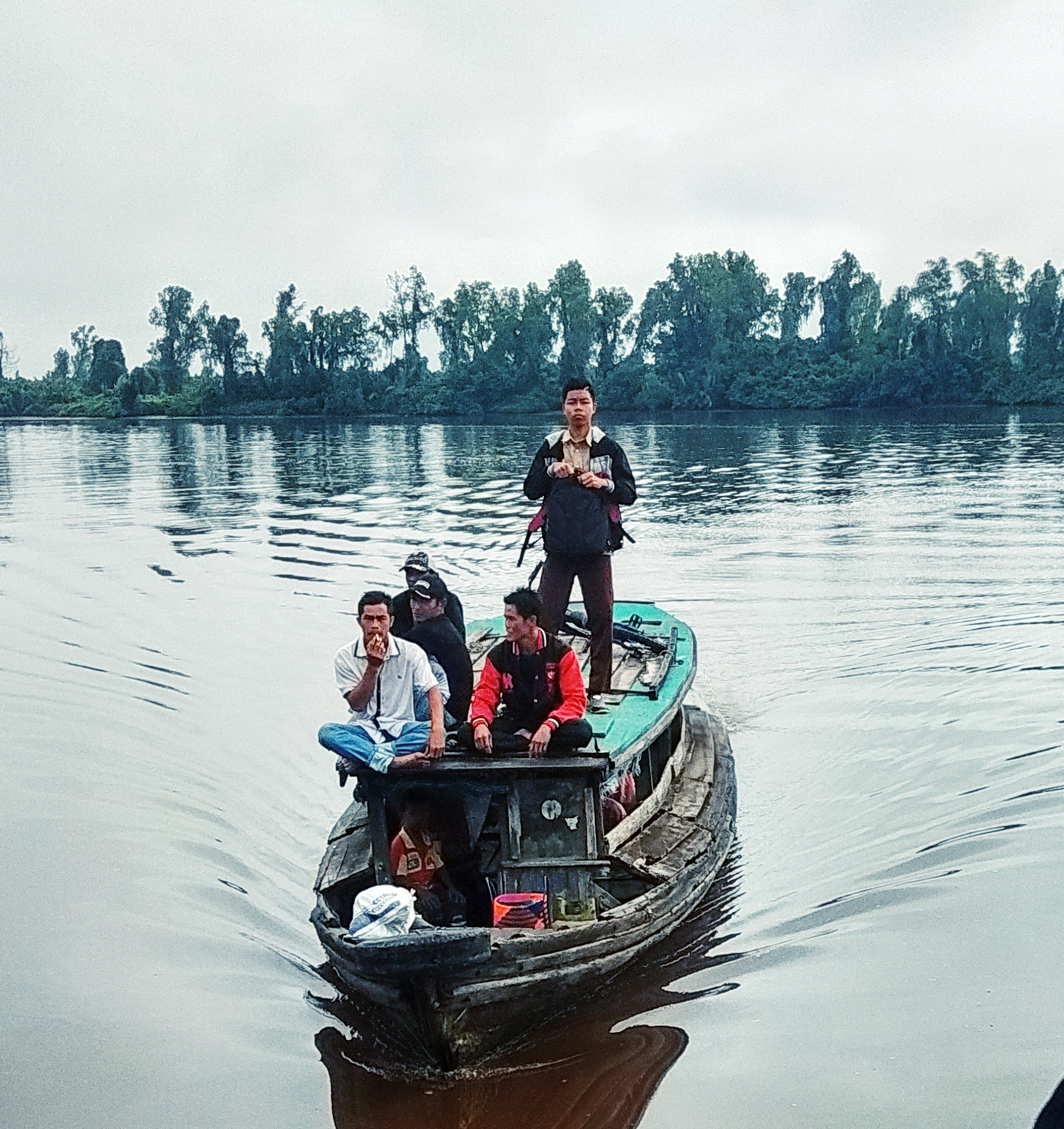
Workers on a klotok

A klotok is a traditional river boat used to navigate the waters of Indonesia. Fitted with inboard or outboard motors, klotoks are primarily used for cabotage up rivers, transporting people and goods. Klotoks are found in floating marketplaces, national parks, and fishing areas. Depending on their function or how they are equipped, they may be called by various names.

== Etymology ==
The boat's name refers to the noise it makes, “klok tok tok tok”. The klotok may also be referred to by other names, such as water taxi, or “motorized gondola” or “mini-trawler”.

== Design ==
The klotok is a wooden river boat with a shallow draft. Its size varies somewhat by use. Common sizes are 12 m (39 ft) by 2.5 m (8.2 ft), such as for a dugout, or 8 m (26 ft) by 10 m (33 ft) for a small commercial boat. It can be even larger, such as a 55 ft (17 m) houseboat. Klotok often have a roof, which forms an upper deck for tourists. The boats may be fitted with inboard engines. Klotoks have varying levels of accommodation, some tourist vessels may provide passengers overnight accommodations with sleeping, dining, and toilet facilities.

== Uses ==
Floating markets, which have existed for over 400 years, use klotoks for trade, including buying and selling agricultural and handicraft products that are brought from the interior of Indonesia to coastal areas.

Klotoks are a popular form of transportation for tourism. Sojourns to visit wild life parks, such as the Tanjung Puting National Park, provide for viewing wildlife along a waterway, particularly the orangutans, which are found in this park in large numbers, plus macaques, proboscis, gibbons, and monkeys. Such travel is a unique experience as klotok navigators are also good wildlife guides within the parks. The demand for these klotoks peaks in July and August.

Highly sophisticated models of the klotok have been developed for use by fishermen who buy them even though they are expensive to use. Modern equipment fitted for some klotoks include purse seine, inboard engines, halogen lamps, cool box and radio. A few klotoks are also used for pole-line fishing. However, for seine fishing, the klotok is equipped with a converted drive shaft. When fitted with the additional fishing equipment, klotoks may be known as "mini-trawlers". When fitted with an outboard motor (comnjarmasin), commonly seen in Banjarmasin in Kalimantan and Jambi in Sumatra, it is called a water taxi.

Other examples of commercial use for transport and distribution include rattan stored in specially built sheds on river docks depend on large klotoks to transport the palms to the timber port town of Sampit.
