= Kumai =

- District
- Location within Kalimantan Location within Indonesia
- Coordinates: 2.74°S 111.73°E
- Country: Indonesia
- Province: Central Kalimantan
- Regency: West Kotawaringin

Kumai is a port in Central Kalimantan province in Indonesia, on the island of Borneo. It lies on the Kumai River.

It was from here that the M/V Senopati Nusantara set out on its ill-fated voyage in December 2006.

Administratively, Kumai is a kecamatan (district) of West Kotawaringin Regency.

== History ==
Kumai was once part of the Kutaringin Monarchy. It was originally led by Pangeran Bendahara, who later gave Kumai to Muhammad Cik, Kumai's village leader. Cik then gave his position to Amsar, who was chosen to be regent of Kumai.

Kumai was a base for Indonesian fighters attacking the Dutch and Japanese on January 14, 1946. Many soldiers died at the base, but it was maintained. To commemorate the battle, the government built a monument and the Taman Bahagia Park in Sei. On Tendang, and on every January 14, people celebrate in the park to remember Kumai's soldiers. The Kobar regent always attends.

Later, the regent H. Abdul Razak signed a region regulation regarding district forming in a plenary council meeting. Seven factions of council supporters agreed and accepted the Raperda that divided the Kumai District into the specified regions: Pangkalan Lada, Pangkalan Banteng, and Kumai as the main district. Razak later explained, "By forming two new districts, we expect that it can support the public service in governance affairs, development issue and social affairs."

== Government and politics ==
=== Motto ===
The motto of Kumai is "Beriman," which is an acronym of Bersih (clean), Indah (beautiful), Ramah (sociable) and Aman (peaceful). The motto itself is generally translated as "Religious". Kumai was established around the 16 or 17 century with the migration of Malay tribes from Pulau Penyengat, Riau. The population assimilated with tribes from Banjar, and also tribes from Malay from West Kalimantan (Pontianak).

=== Facilities ===
Roads throughout the district vary from dirt to asphalt, but remain adequate. Residents often rent a car or "mikrolet" to travel between towns.

Much transportation takes place on the river. The dock at Panglima Oetar port is the hub for inter-island sea transportation, and is where imports and exports enter and leave the district. Other ports include the CPO and Ferry ports in Sei. Tempenik. Goods and people are also transported on various rivers throughout the district.

Electricity services are dispersed throughout the region, and while many residents drink water from rivers and wells, there is also a drinking water distribution company: PDAM.

=== Heads of Kumai District ===
1. Drs. Syahruddin, M.Si (2013–present)
2. Drs. Tengku Alisyahbana, M.Si(2011–2013)
3. Drs. Abdul Wahab (2008–2011)
4. Drs. Gusti M. Imansyah (2002–2008)
5. Yunus B. A. (2000–2002)
6. Drs. Sukarman Agani (1997–2000)
7. Gusti Suharman (1994–1997)
8. Drs. Abdul Muis (????–1994)
9. M. Achyar, BA - (1977–1985)
10. Hasbullah -
11. Amsar -

== Geography ==
Kumai has total area about 2.921,00 km^{2}. On the north side, the Kumi is adjacent to the Arut Utara district. Seruyan regency is to the East, Java Sea to the South, and Arut Selatan to the West.

=== Topographics ===
The northern region of the Kumai District consists mostly of fertile plains. The center and southern regions are wetter, and are made up of bogs, lakes, and other various bodies of water.

=== Climate ===
There are two seasons in Kumai, namely the dry and rainy seasons. The temperature averages about 20 to 30 degrees Celsius, and the mount inclination is about 0 to 100 m and 0 to 80%.

== Demographics ==
Kumai District was formerly much the largest district in the West Kotawaringin regency, but it is now divided into three new districts: Kumai (covering the largest part of the old district), Pangkalan Lada, and Pangkalan Banteng. Kumai District now covers about 2,915.05 km^{2}, while Pangkalan District covers 1,311.73 km^{2} and Pangkalan Lada covers 284.73 km^{2}.

There were 53,054 people living in the reduced Kumai District in mid 2022, while Pangkalan Banteng had 38,235 inhabitants and Pangkalan Lada had 34,964. Kumai has 155 RTs (neighborhood administrative units), and 23 RWs (residence administrative units).

The capital of the new Kumai District is Kumai. It is now divided into 18 administrative villages (rural desa and urban kelurahan). The new districts are Kumai Hulu, Kumai Hilir and Candi. The regions are Cabang, Teluk Pulai, Sekonyer, Batu Belaman, Pangkalan Satu, Kubu, Sei, Bakau, Bedaun, Teluk Bogam, Keraya, Sebuai, Kapitan, and Bumiharjo.

The capital of the Pangkalan Lada District is Pandu Senjaya. The district was initially proposed as a center for Kumai, covering seven counties (Makarti Jaya, Pangkalan Lada, Pandu Senjaya, Lada Mandala Jaya, Sumber Agung, Sungai Rangit Jaya and Purba Sari).

Karang Mulya is the capital of Pangkalan Banteng District (ex Natai Kerbau SP 4). It is the easternmost district and covers eight counties (Desa Mulya Jadi, Pangkalan Banteng, Karang Mulya, Marga Mulya, Arga Mulya, Amin Jaya, Sido Mulya and Kebun Agung).

=== Ethnic backgrounds ===
The majority of the people are Malay and Banjarese. The others are Madurese, Javanese, Bugis, Sundanese, Dayak, Chinese, java and some foreign citizens (volunteers, researchers and tourists).

=== Religion ===
The majority of the people are Muslim (85%). Others are Hindu, Buddhist, and Christian (Protestant and Catholic). There are 33 Muslim mosques in the Kumai District, 83 small mosques, three churches and one other house of worship.

=== Language ===
Kumai Language (Coastal Language) is the daily language of Kumai. It bears similarities to Banjar language because some of the residents originated from Banjar. Being a port city and host to many immigrants, the languages in Kumai are highly varied.

=== Occupations ===
Kumai Residents have various occupations. In general they work as fishermen, but some also work as farmers, PNS (Public Civil Servants), ABRI, traders, animal breeders, miners, or private employees in companies that harvest oil palm and/or coconut.

== Art and culture ==
Tirik is a form of poetry popular in the Kuami Hulu District.

Music and dance is central to the culture of the Kumai District. Hadrah is a form of Islamic music that uses rebana. Japin is a traditional dance of the Melayu people that is still performed in the district of Candi.

Several annual festivals dot the local calendar as well. The Beberish Benua (literally "cleaning continent") is held every year by local fishermen. Other traditional ceremonies - such as weddings, circumcisions, etc. - are usually held in Kumai.

== Tourism ==
=== Tanjung Puting National Park ===
The Tanjung Puting National Park is a conservation area that protects a large variety of plants, animals and their associated ecosystems. It is the largest protected area of swamp forest in South-East Asia.

Tanjung Puting first received a level of protection in 1935, and was officially designated a wildlife reserve in 1939. In 1982, it was declared a national park.

The park was established primarily for the protection of the Bornean orangutan (Pongo pygmaeus), and its formation was instigated and aided by the efforts of Dr. Birute Galdikas and the Orangutan Foundation International. When this area become a national park, Tanjung Harapan moved to the other side of the Sekonyer River (across the original area). The original width of the park was 3,000.4 km^{2}. In its new location, it increased to 4,150.4 km^{2}.

The park receives aid from the Orangutan International Canada, and it is recognized as a World Biosphere Reserve by the United Nations. Tanjung Puting occupies most of the peninsula between Teluk Kumai and the Seruyan River, and consists of varied habitats including peat and freshwater swamp forests, lowland tropical rainforests and heath forests. The park is drained by several black water rivers that flow from the northern and eastern regions.

Tanjung Puting National Park is famous primarily because of two primates: the orangutan and the proboscis monkey (endemic to Borneo). At Camp Leakey, research is conducted on orangutans, gibbons, other animals and ecological processes. Orangutans are also rehabilitated and returned to the wild from this camp. Since 1971, over 200 orangutans have been returned to the wild as part of Dr. Birute Galdika's Orangutan Research and Conservation Project.

The park is divided into four areas, each highlighting a different set of natural resources. They are:

1. Tanjung Harapan. This area was developed for ecotourism, and hosts the information center, guest house, watch tower and camping ground. By traveling along the edge of the river, one can see the nipah formation, screw pine and bog forest. Hiking and bird watching are also popular.
2. Pondok Tanggui. This area is home to pre-wild and adolescent orangutans. It hosts various kinds of animals like deer, pig, the rangkong bird (rhinoceros), Raja Udang bird and Sesep Madu bird. During journeys from Tanjung Harapan to Pondok Tanggui, one passes through the habitats of the proboscis monkey and the estuarine crocodile (Crocodylus porosus).
3. Camp Leakey. This area is devoted to the research and rehabilitation of adult orangutans. It is suitable for witnessing pre-wild or wild orangutan rehabilitation. Other species that can be seen in this area include the Müller's Bornean gibbon (owa-owa), bald eagle, crimson sunbird (sesep madu) and hornbill (enggang or rangkong).
4. Pantai Sungai Cabang. This area is located alongside a white sand beach. The working and maintenance huts are located here, along with guest houses, an information center, shelter, watch tower, camp ground, dock and various other tourist activities.

=== Bugam Raya ===
The Bugam Raya countryside includes the Kubu beach, Bay of Bogam, and the Keraya and Sungai Umbang coastal areas. Bugam Raya is a sub-province of West Kotawaringin, and is about 28 km or one hour by automobile from Pangkalan.

This region is hot and desolate grassland, called "alang-alang" in Indonesia.

The Kubu countryside is a coastal, and so, many of the residents are fishermen.

The Sungai Umbang coast is a popular area due to its many mangrove trees.

=== Patih Mambang Waterfall ===
The Patih Mambang waterfall cascades from the hills and fields of the Keraya countryside into the sea. It is a popular area for diving, surfing and fishing.

=== Sei. Cabang beach ===
The beach in Sei. Cabang is known for its clean, white sand. It was established by the Friends of the National Parks Foundation (FNPF) as a conservation area for green turtles.

=== Sei. Rengas ===
Sei. Rengas is an area rumored to contain buried treasure, although no substantial information confirms this.

=== George A. Winke's mausoleum (Sei. Kapitan) ===
The mausoleum pays respects to Captain George A. Winke, a Dutch soldier who is buried in the Sei. Kapitan countryside where the monument is located.

== Sources ==
- Statistical Center Department. 2004. Kotawaringin Barat dalam Angka. Pangkalan Bun.
- Kumai District Office. 2004. Kumai dalam Angka. Kumai.
- Banjarmasin Post. 2003. Kumai menjadi tiga kecamatan, (Online), (https://www.google.com/banjarmasinpost)
- Sinar Harapan. 2003. Cari tahu tentang desa Kubu, (Online), (https://www.google.com/sinarharapan)
- Yadi, Muhammad. 2006. Upaya Peningkatan Pendapatan Asli Daerah (PAD) Melalui Kegiatan Pengembangan Wisata Alam Di Kabupaten Kotawaringin Barat, hlm. 2.
- BAPPEDA Kabupaten Kotawaringin Barat. 2002. Penyusunan Akhir Dan Penggandaan Buku Sejarah Kotawaringin Barat. Pangkalan Bun
- Dinas Pariwisata Kabupaten Kotawaringin Barat. Pangkalan Bun
