= List of rivers of West Java =

List of rivers flowing in the province of West Java, Indonesia:

== In alphabetical order ==
- Ci Angke
- Ci Anten
- Ci Asem
- Ci Beet
- Ci Buni
- Ci Durian
- Ci Kaengan
- Ci Kapundung
- Ci Kaso (Garut)
- Ci Kaso (Sukabumi)
- Ci Laki
- Ci Liwung
- Ci Mandiri
- Ci Manuk
- Ci Sadane
- Ci Tanduy
- Ci Tarum
- Pesanggrahan River

== See also ==
- Drainage basins of Java
- List of drainage basins of Indonesia
- List of rivers of Indonesia
- List of rivers of Java
