= List of rivers of Java =

List of rivers flowing in the island of Java, Indonesia.

== In alphabetical order ==
- Angke River
- Asem River
- Baliung River
- Baru Barat River
- Baru Timur River
- Bodri River
- Brantas River
  - Mas River
  - Porong River
- Buaran River
- Buni River
- Cakung
- Ci Banten
- Ci Durian
- Ci Kaengan
- Ci Kapundung
- Ci Liwung
- Ci Manceuri
- Ci Manuk
- Ci Pinang
- Ci Sadane
- Ci Tanduy
- Ci Tarum
  - Beet River
- Ci Ujung
- Comal River
- Grogol River
- Jatikramat River
- Kaso River (Sukabumi)
- Kaso River (Garut)
- Krukut River
- Laki River
- Liman River
- Lusi River
- Madiun River
- Mandiri River
- Mookervaart River
- Opak River
- Oyo River
- Pemali River
- Pesanggrahan River
- Progo River
- Sanen River
- Serang River
- Serayu River
- Setail River
- Solo River
- Sunter River
- Tuntang River
- Widas River

== Mouth location ==
The following list groups the rivers by the direction of the flow: the west, north, south or east coast of the Java island.

=== West coast of Java ===
The following river flows toward the west coast of Java to the Sunda Strait.

- Liman River

=== North coast of Java ===
The following rivers flow toward the north coast of Java to the Java Sea (from west to east).

- Ci Banten
- Ci Durian
- Asem River
- Bodri River
- Ci Liwung
- Ci Manceuri
- Ci Sadane
- Ci Tarum
  - Beet River
  - Ci Kapundung
- Ci Ujung
- Ci Manuk
- Pemali River
- Serang River
  - Lusi River
- Solo River
  - Madiun River
- Brantas River
  - Mas River
  - Porong River
  - Widas River

==== North coast of Jakarta ====
The following rivers flow toward the north coast of Jakarta to the Java Sea (from west to east).

1. Mookervaart River
2. Angke River
3. Pesanggrahan River
4. Grogol River
5. Krukut River
6. Baru Barat River
7. Ci Liwung
8. Baru Timur River
9. Ci Pinang
10. Sunter River
11. Buaran River
12. Jatikramat River
13. Cakung River

=== South coast of Java ===
The following rivers flow toward the south coast of Java to the Indian Ocean.

- Baliung River
- Buni River
- Ci Kaengan
- Ci Tanduy
- Kaso River: Sukabumi and Garut
- Laki River
- Mandiri River
- Opak River
  - Oyo River
- Progo River
- Sanen River
- Serayu River

=== East coast of Java ===
The following river flows toward the east coast of Java to the Bali Strait.

- Setail River

== By Province ==
=== Banten ===
- Baliung River
- Ci Banten
- Ci Durian
- Cihara River
- Ci Liman
- Ci Manceuri
- Ci Sadane
- Ci Ujung
- Pesanggrahan River

=== Central Java ===
- Bengawan Solo
- Bodri River
- Ci Beet
  - Ci Dayeuh
  - Ci Kawalon
- Comal River
- Pemali River
- Progo River
- Serang River
  - Lusi River
- Serayu River
- Tuntang River

=== East Java ===
- Bengawan Solo
- Brantas River
- Madiun River
- Mas River
- Porong River
- Sanen River
- Setail River
- Widas River

=== Jakarta ===
- Angke
- Baru Barat
- Baru Timur
- Buaran
- Cakung
- Ciliwung
- Cipinang
- Grogol
- Jatikramat
- Krukut
- Mookervaart
- Pesanggrahan
- Sunter

=== West Java ===
- Ci Asem
- Ci Beet
- Ci Buni
- Ci Durian
- Ci Kaengan
- Ci Kapundung
- Ci Kaso (Garut)
- Ci Kaso (Sukabumi)
- Ci Laki
- Ci Liwung
- Ci Mandiri
- Ci Manuk
- Ci Sadane
- Ci Tanduy
- Ci Tarum
- Pesanggrahan River

=== Yogyakarta ===
- Code River
- Opak River
- Oyo River
- Progo River

== See also ==
- Drainage basins of Java
- List of drainage basins of Indonesia
- List of rivers of Indonesia
