= List of rivers of Central Java =

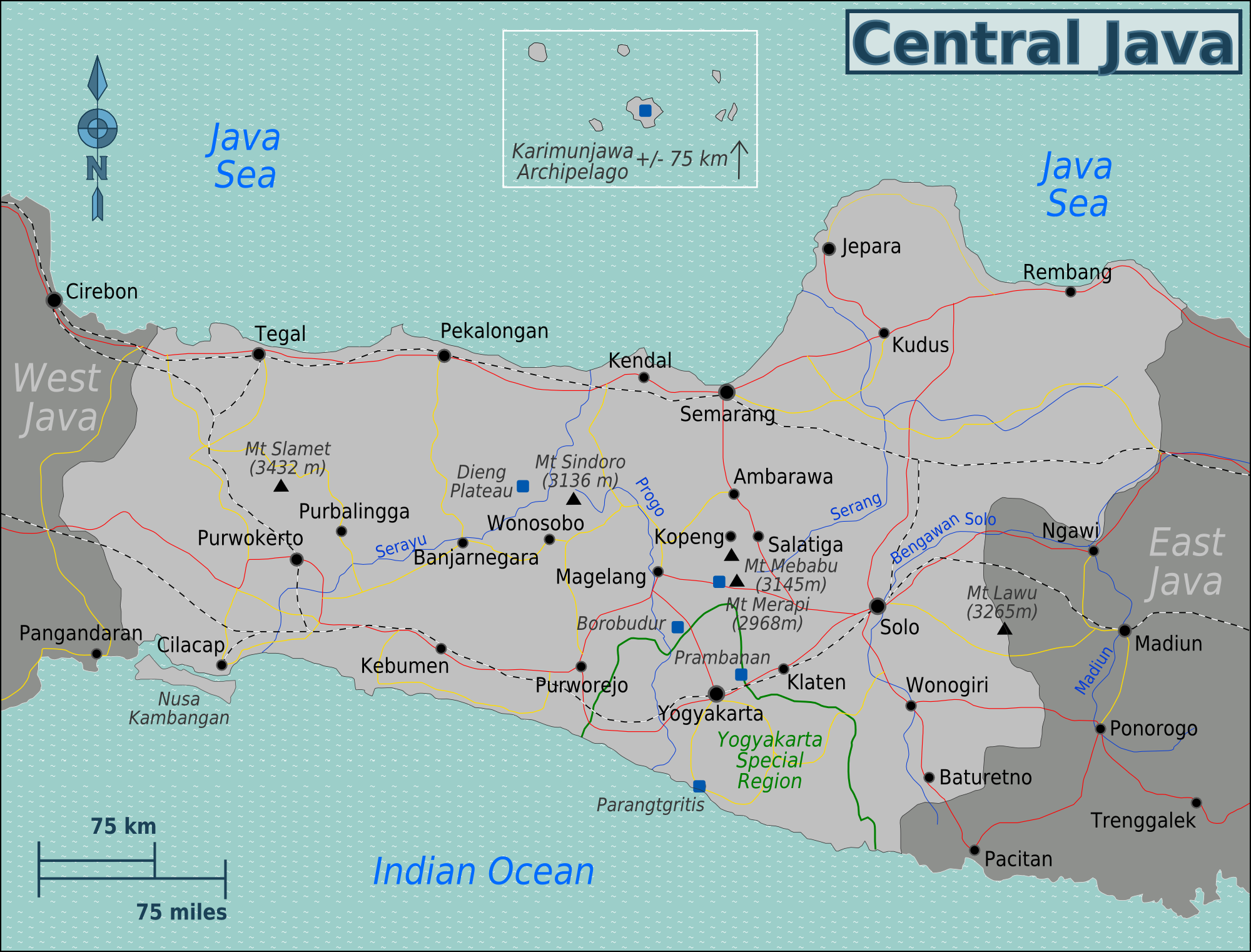
Central Java map with major rivers.

List of rivers flowing in the province of Central Java, Indonesia:

== In alphabetical order ==
- Bengawan Solo
- Bodri River
- Ci Beet
  - Ci Dayeuh
  - Ci Kawalon
- Comal River
- Pemali River
- Progo River
- Serang River
  - Lusi River
- Serayu River
- Tuntang River

== See also ==
- Drainage basins of Java
- List of drainage basins of Indonesia
- List of rivers of Indonesia
- List of rivers of Java
