= List of rivers of Banten =

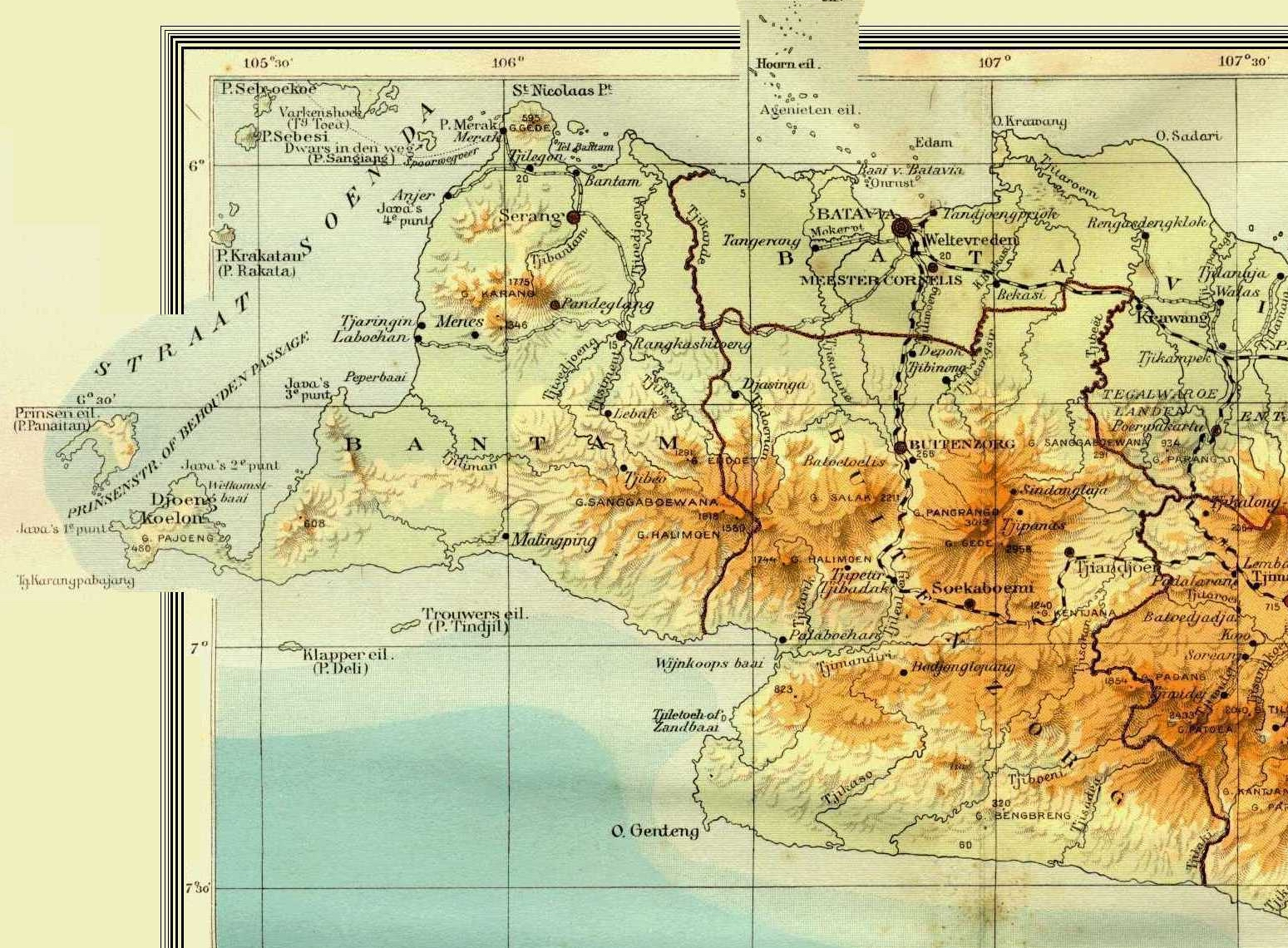
Old map of Banten with major rivers.

This is a list of rivers flowing in the province of Banten, Indonesia.

== In alphabetical order ==
- Baliung River
- Ci Banten
- Ci Durian
- Cihara River
- Ci Liman
- Ci Manceuri
- Ci Sadane
- Ci Ujung
- Pesanggrahan River

== Watershed area ==
In Banten Province there are four river regions (Indonesian: Wilayah Sungai); two of them are under the authority of Banten Province, i.e. Ciliman-Cibungur and Cibaliung-Cisawarna, whereas the other two are under the authority of the central government, i.e. Cidanau-Ciujung-Cidurian and Ciliwung-Cisadane.

The government of Banten Province has the authority over 102 watershed areas (Indonesian: Daerah Aliran Sungai), including 75 areas in the Cibaliung Cisawarna river region and 27 other in Ciliman Cibungur river region.

The watershed areas and the river regions in Banten Province are as follows:

1. Cibaliung Cisawarna River Region (under Banten Province)
2. Ciliman Cibungur River Region (under Banten Province)
3. Cidanau Ciujung Cidurian River Region (under the central government)
4. Ciliwung Cisadane River Region (under the central government)

== See also ==
- Drainage basins of Java
- List of drainage basins of Indonesia
- List of rivers of Indonesia
- List of rivers of Java
