= List of rivers of East Java =

List of rivers flowing in the province of East Java, Indonesia:

== In alphabetical order ==
- Bengawan Solo
- Brantas River
- Madiun River
- Mas River
- Porong River
- Sanen River
- Setail River
- Widas River

== See also ==
- Drainage basins of Java
- List of drainage basins of Indonesia
- List of rivers of Indonesia
- List of rivers of Java
