= List of rivers of Jakarta =

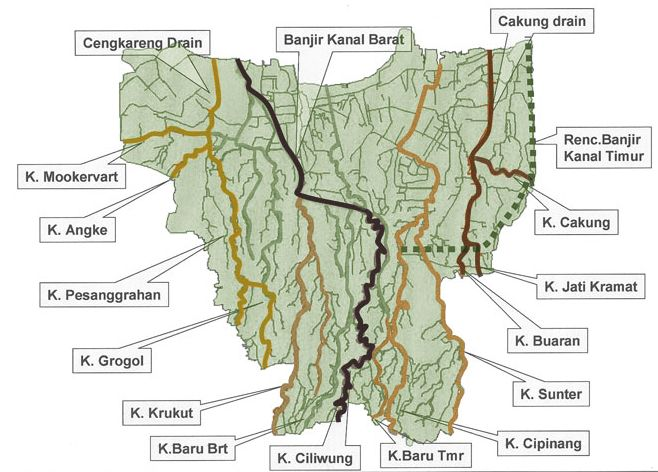
Map of rivers of Jakarta (2012)

The Special Capital Region of Jakarta, located on the north coast of western Java, has thirteen major rivers. The region contains 664 square kilometres (256 sq mi) of land and 6,977 square kilometres (2,694 sq mi) of water.

== List of rivers ==
- Angke
- Baru Barat
- Baru Timur
- Buaran
- Cakung
- Ciliwung
- Cipinang
- Grogol
- Jatikramat
- Krukut
- Mookervaart
- Pesanggrahan
- Sunter

== See also ==
- Drainage basins of Java
- List of drainage basins of Indonesia
- List of rivers of Indonesia
- List of rivers of Java
