= Muria Strait =

- Muria Strait at the time of Sultan Trenggana (1521–1546). By 1657 this strait had shrunk or disappeared.

- Location within Java Location within Indonesia
- Coordinates: 6°52′S 110°53′E
- Type: former strait
- Primary inflows: Java Sea
- Primary outflows: Java Sea
- Basin countries: Indonesia
- Average depth: 0 metres (0 ft)
- Islands: Greater Sunda Islands

The Muria Strait (Indonesian: Selat Muria) was a former strait that once separated the island of Muria from the northern coast of Central Java, Indonesia. The strait historically flowed between Mount Muria to the north and the present-day regencies of Jepara, Kudus, and Pati to the south. In geological terms, it served as a shallow marine channel that connected the Java Sea in the north with estuarine and riverine systems to the south. Over the centuries, the strait gradually silted up due to sedimentation from nearby rivers such as the Wulan, Serang, and Juwana, and by around the 17th to 18th centuries, the Muria Strait had disappeared entirely, with the former island of Muria becoming part of mainland Java.

The Muria Strait once played a significant role in the regional geography and maritime activity of northern Java. It provided a natural waterway that facilitated trade, fishing, and transport between settlements on either side. Archaeological and historical records suggest that the strait may have influenced the development of early port towns and settlements in the area, including Jepara, which was a prominent seaport in the Majapahit and Demak Sultanate periods. The presence of the strait also influenced the distribution of mangrove forests, estuarine ecosystems, and deltaic landscapes that remain partially preserved in the coastal zones of Pati and Jepara today.

== Geography ==
The Muria Strait is currently included in the main non-structural plain, which means that it is estimated that in a period in the past the area was an ocean.

=== Muria Island ===
At the time of the Muria Strait there was an island called Muria Island. The landscape of Muria Island itself consists of Mount Muria which is located in the middle. While in the southern part there are Patiayam hills which were formed from the volcanic activity of Mount Muria in the past (some examples are Maar Bambang, Maar Gunungrowo, and Maar Gembong).

Paleontological records state that the Patiayam hills area has various fossils of ancient buffalo (Bos bubalis paleokarbau), banteng (Bos bibos paleosondaicus, deer family/Cervidae (Cervus zwaani), wild boar family, elephant, stegodon elephant, hippopotamus family, tiger family, turtle family, and mollusk fossils.

On this island are also located the capital cities of the northern coast of Java, such as Jepara, Kudus, and Pati.

== Harbor ==
In its time on the banks of the Muria Strait there were trading ports with various commodities such as traditional cloth from Jepara, salt and shrimp paste from Juwana, and rice from the interior of Java and Muria Island. In addition, the existence of the strait also makes the Muria Strait area the location of shipyards that produce Javanese junks made of teak wood which are commonly found in the Kendeng Mountains [id], which is located in the south of the strait. The existence of a shipbuilding industry made this area richer than the center of the Majapahit Kingdom, so this area which was dominated by Muslim merchants who were nicknamed by Tomé Pires (a Portuguese writer) as "lords of the junks".

Initially, this area consisted of small ports around the strait with Demak as the main port, but due to political conflicts, commodities originating from the area around the Muria Strait (Muria Island and Kendeng Mountains) shifted to Sunda Kelapa Harbor. In addition, a report in 1657 stated that fluvial deposits from rivers that emptied into the Muria Strait such as Serang River, Tuntang River, and Lusi River resulted in siltation so that the strait could not be crossed by large ships. The trading center was moved to Jepara. Because of this siltation, Tumenggung Natairnawa from Pati had ordered to dig up the sediment in the strait, but the sediment was getting faster in removing the Muria Strait. In the last days of the existence of the Muria Strait there was a water channel that could be passed by small boats which is now called the Londo River.

== Current condition ==
The remainder of the Muria Strait can be seen by the Londo River, which stretches from Juwana in the east to Ketanjung in the west. Several rivers are also formed from the former Muria Strait such as the Silugunggo River which crosses the Pati Regency area. In this area, there are often the discovery of the wreckage of boats, ships, and cannons which are evidence of the existence of a strait in this area.

In addition, the area that used to be the Muria Strait is often flooded during the rainy season.
