= List of rivers of Yogyakarta =

List of rivers flowing in the province of Yogyakarta, Indonesia:

== In alphabetical order ==
- Code River
- Opak River
- Oyo River
- Progo River

== See also ==
- Drainage basins of Java
- List of drainage basins of Indonesia
- List of rivers of Indonesia
- List of rivers of Java
