= Baliung River =

River in Java, Indonesia

Baliung River Tjibaliung, Tji Baliung Ci Binuangeun
- Location within Java Location within Indonesia
- Native name: Ci Baliung, Cibaliung (Sundanese)

Location
- Country: Indonesia
- State: Banten

Physical characteristics
- Source
  - location: Cijaku, Lebak Regency
  - coordinates: 6.683980°S 106.120025°E
- 2nd source
  - location: Cibaliung, Pandeglang Regency
  - coordinates: 6.679816°S 105.696192°E
- Mouth: Indian Ocean
  - location: Muarabinuangeun, Lebak Regency
  - coordinates: 6.841866°S 105.879878°E
- Basin size: 544 km^{2} (210 mi^{2})

Basin features
- River system: Cibaliung basin [DAS210736]
- River Basin Management Unit: BPDAS Citarum Ciliwung

The Baliung River is a river flowing in southern Java, within the Banten province, Indonesia. The upstream starts in the southern mountains of Java; it flows southward into the Indian Ocean, about 130 kilometres (81 mi) southwest of Jakarta.

== Hydrology ==
The watershed area (Indonesian: Daerah Aliran Sungai) of the Baliung River belongs to the Cibaliung–Cisawarna River region (Indonesian: Wilayah Sungai), one of the four river region in Banten, and one of the two river areas under the authority of Banten province. There are 75 watershed areas in the Cibaliung–Cisawarna river region.

== Geography ==
Ci Baliung

Climate chart (precipitation, max. and min. temperature)
J	F	M	A	M	J	J	A	S	O	N	D
345 22 18	407 23 17	338 23 17	443 24 18	333 22 18	180 22 18	260 23 17	167 24 17	89 24 17	290 25 18	492 22 19	497 22 18
- █ Average max. and min. temperatures in °C
- █ Precipitation totals in mm
Imperial conversion
J	F	M	A	M	J	J	A	S	O	N	D
14 72 64	16 73 63	13 73 63	17 75 64	13 72 64	7.1 72 64	10 73 63	6.6 75 63	3.5 75 63	11 77 64	19 72 66	20 72 64
- █ Average max. and min. temperatures in °F
- █ Precipitation totals in inches

The river flows in the southwest area of Java with a predominantly tropical rainforest climate (designated as Af in the Köppen–Geiger climate classification). The annual average temperature in the area is 23 °C. The warmest month is March, when the average temperature is around 26 °C, and the coldest is May, at 21 °C. The average annual rainfall is 3842 mm. The wettest month is December, with an average of 497 mm of rainfall, and the driest is September, with 89 mm of rainfall.

== See also ==
- Cihara River
- List of drainage basins of Indonesia
- List of rivers of Banten
- List of rivers of Indonesia
- List of rivers of Java
