= Comal =

Comal may refer to:

- COMAL, a computer programming language
- Comal (cookware), a type of griddle

== Places ==
- Comal River (Indonesia)
- Comal County, Texas, U.S.
- Comal River, Texas, U.S.
- Comal Springs (Texas), U.S.
