= Mandiri River =

Coordinates: 7.027°S 106.5481°E

Mandiri River Ci Mandiri, Sungai Cimandiri, Tji Mandiri, Tjimandiri, Tjimandir
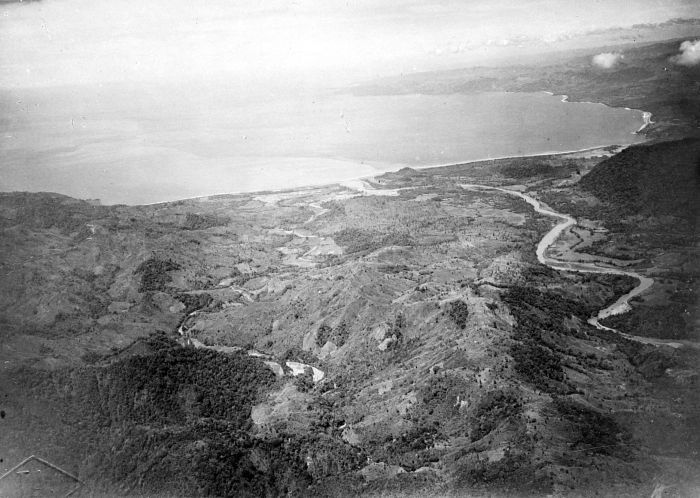
- The mouth of Cimandiri River at Pelabuhan Ratu Bay (1920–1940)

- Location of the river mouth Mandiri River (Indonesia)

Location
- Country: Indonesia

Physical characteristics
- Source
  - location: West Java
- Mouth
  - location: Indian Ocean
- Length: 100 km (62 mi)
- Basin size: 2,014.31 km^{2} (777.73 sq mi)

Mandiri River (Indonesian: Sungai Ciandiri or Sundanese: Ci Mandiri) is a river in southwestern Java of West Java province, Indonesia. It flows mainly in the Sukabumi Regency.

== Hydrology ==
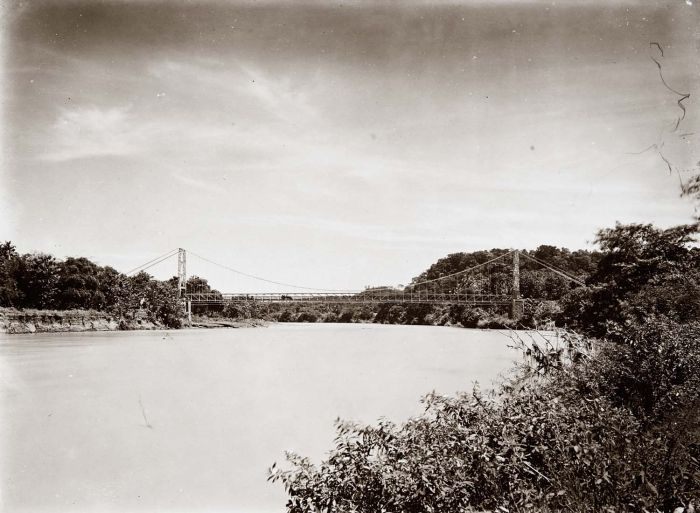
Cimandiri River with an iron bridge near Pelabuhan Ratu Bay (formerly: Wijnkoops-baai), 1920–1931.

The river flows from east to west with a length of around 100 km. The upstream of Cimandiri is located on the Mount Pasir Caringin, Sukamanah village, district of Gegerbitung and discharges into Indian Ocean near Pelabuhan Ratu. The tributaries of Cimandiri also flow from Mount Gede, Mount Pangrango, Mount Salak and Mount Halimun. The watershed (Indonesian: Daerah Aliran Sungai/DAS) of Cimandiri has a area of 201,431 hectare, stretching from around Padalarang and the conservation area of Mount Halimun at the upstream to the southwest direction until the river mouth at Pelabuhan Ratu Bay. DAS Cimandiri comprises also the tributaries of Cimandiri: Cicatih, Cipelang, Citarik, Cibodas, and Cidadap, which flow into Pelabuhan Ratu Bay, Sukabumi Regency. DAS Cimandiri is classified as a local watershed, meaning the whole area is contained within one regency and utilized by that one regency; in this case: Sukabumi Regency.

=== Tributaries ===
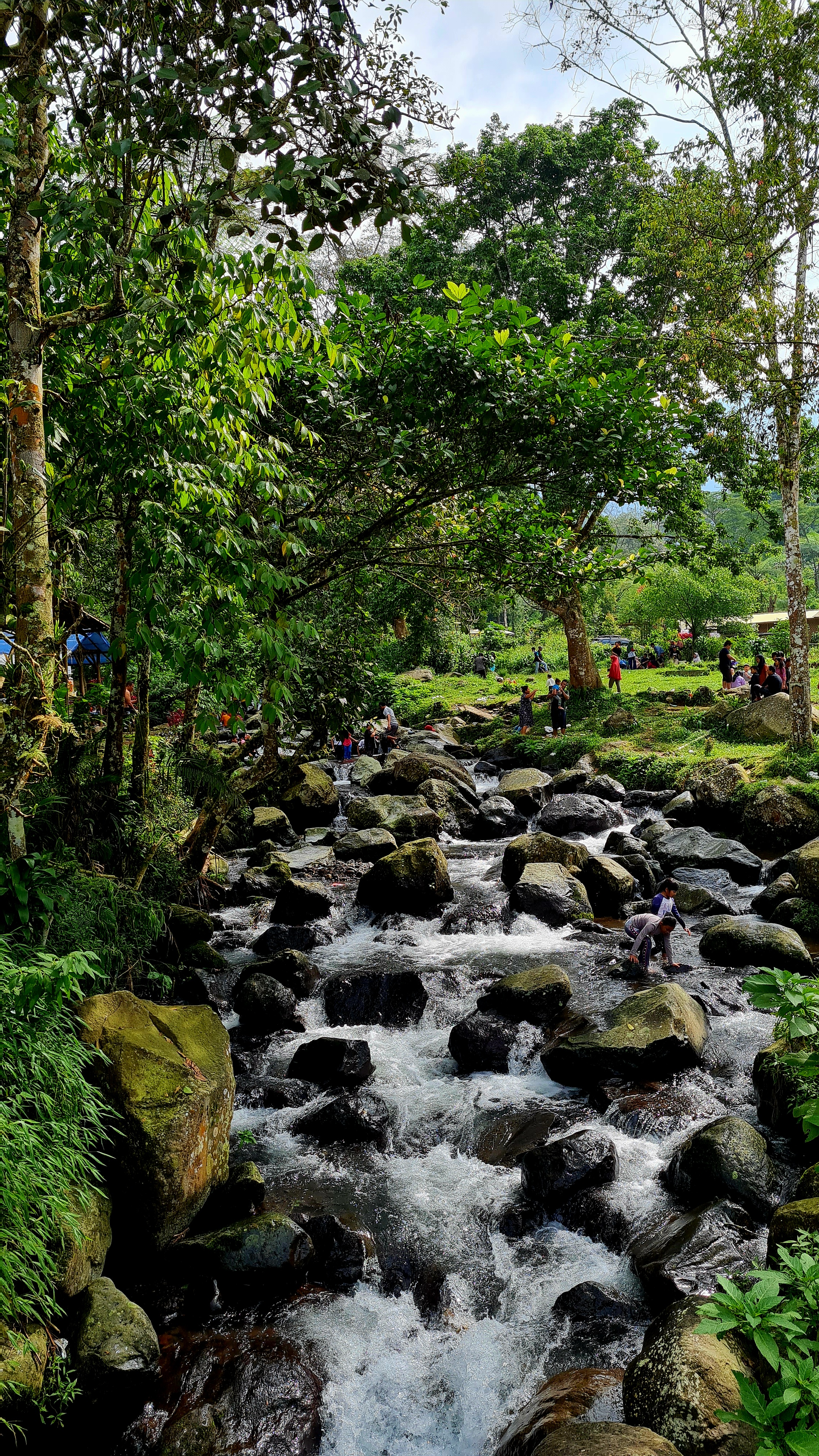
Cipelang River in Pondok Halimun, Sukabumi

Some tributaries of Cimandiri with a length of more than 10 km, from the upstream, are:

1. Cidadap River
2. Citarik River
3. Cigadung River
4. Cicareuh River
5. Cicatih River
6. Cibojong River
7. Cibatu River
8. Citalahab River
9. Cipelang River
10. Cibeureum River
11. Cijuray River
12. Cimuncang River
13. Cikole River
14. Cikupa River

== Geography ==
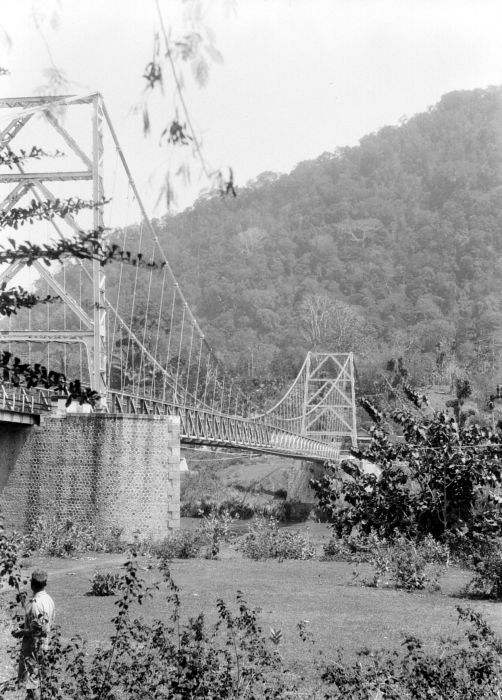
The iron bridge on the Cimandiri River near Pelabuhan Ratu (26 October 1929).

The river flows in the southwest area of Java with a predominantly tropical monsoon climate (designated as Am in the Köppen-Geiger climate classification). The annual average temperature in the area is 23 °C. The warmest month is October when the average temperature is around 26 °C, and the coldest is January, at 18 °C. The average annual rainfall is 3834 mm. The wettest month is December, with an average of 578 mm of rainfall, and the driest is September, with 35 mm of rainfall.

== See also ==
- Cihara River
- List of drainage basins of Indonesia
- List of rivers of Indonesia
