= Mayang River =

River of Java, Indonesia

Location
- Country: Indonesia
- State: East Java

Physical characteristics
- Source: Mount Raung
  - location: Ledokombo
  - coordinates: 8.12557°S 114.04667°E
  - elevation: 1,500 m (4,900 ft)
- Mouth: Indian Ocean
  - location: Batuulo
  - coordinates: 8.44°S 113.5896°E
- Basin size: 1,113 km^{2} (430 sq mi)

Basin features
- River system: DAS Mayang
- Source and mouth location of Kali Mayang

Mayang River or Kali Mayang is a river located in the south of East Java and flows into the Indian Ocean at a cape in Watuulo, Jember Regency, in the southern coastal area of Java. The river originates in the southwest of Mount Raung. It has a length of approximately 146 km (91 mi) and a watershed area covering 1,113 km^{2} (430 sq mi).

== See also ==
- Ijen
- List of drainage basins of Indonesia
- Meru Betiri National Park
- Sanen River
