= Ci Ujung =

Ci Ujung Ujung river, Ciujung river
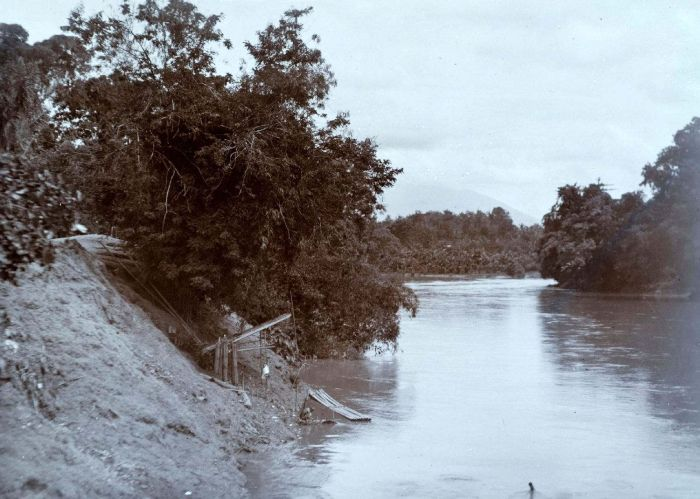
- The Ciberang and Ciujung rivers coming together at Rangkasbitung, 1910-1934

- Location in Java

Location
- Country: Indonesia

Physical characteristics
- Source: Mount Halimun Salak National Park
  - location: Bogor Regency
- 2nd source
  - location: Lebak Regency
- Mouth
  - location: Tengkurak, Tirtayasa, Serang, Banten
  - coordinates: 5°57′47″S 106°21′25″E
- Basin size: 2,159 km^{2} (834 mi^{2})

Basin features
- River system: Ciujung basin

The Ciujung (Ujung River, as the prefix "ci" means "river") is a river in the province of West Java and Banten on the island of Java, Indonesia. Primarily in Lebak Regency, the river basin covers an area of 2,022.14 km^{2}.

== Location ==
The rivers in Banten, the westernmost province of Java, run roughly parallel to each other. The main ones are the Peteh, called the Banten on the lower reaches near the city of Kota Banten (with a basin area of 257.15 km^{2}), the Ujung (basin area of 2,022.14 km^{2}), which enters the sea at Pontang, the Durian (basin area of 732.62 km^{2}), which enters the sea at Tanara, the Manceuri, and the Sadane (basin area of 1,400.32 km^{2}), which rises in the mountainous region of Priyangan and in 1682 formed the border between the Dutch East India Company (VOC) territory and Batavia (modern Jakarta). The rivers fan out into deltas near the coast. The Ciujung discharges into the 120 square kilometres (46 sq mi) of Banten Bay.

The original inhabitants of the mouths of Ci Ujung, Ci Durian, and Ci Banten rivers were Sundanese people. In 1682 there were paddy fields on the lower reaches of the Ujung and Durian. Pontang Port and the Ciujung River used to be important for carrying merchandise into the interior. The river itself sits on an elevation of 10 meters.

== See also ==
- Cihara River
- Ciliman River
- List of rivers of Indonesia
- List of rivers of Java
- List of drainage basins of Indonesia

== Sources ==
- "Banten", Ensiklopedi Umum (in Indonesian), Kanisius, 1973, ISBN 978-979-413-522-8
- Green, Edmund Peter (2003), World Atlas of Seagrasses, University of California Press, ISBN 978-0-520-24047-6
- Talens, Johan (1 January 1999), Een feodale samenleving in koloniaal vaarwater: staatsvorming, koloniale expansie en economische onderontwikkeling in Banten, West Java (1600–1750) (in Dutch), Uitgeverij Verloren, ISBN 90-6550-067-7
- Titi Surti Nastiti (2006), "Old Sundanese Community", Archaeology: Indonesian Perspective : R.P. Soejono's Festschrift, Yayasan Obor Indonesia, ISBN 978-979-26-2499-1
