= Baru Barat River =

River in Jakarta, Indonesia

Coordinates: 6.2347°S 106.8436°E

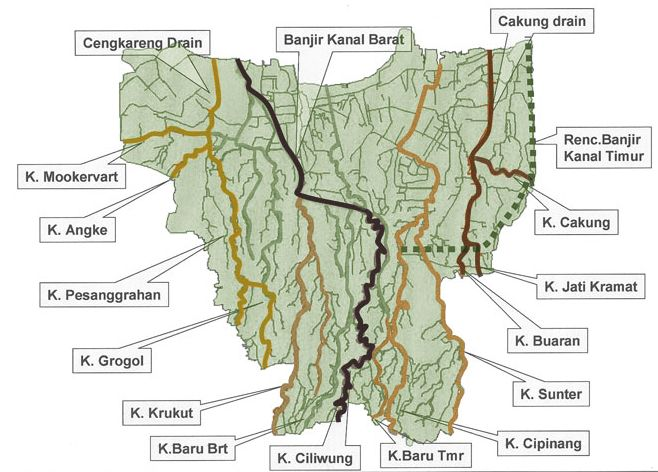
- Kali Baru Barat ("K. Baru Brt"), bottom left in the map of rivers and canals of Jakarta (2012)
- Native name: Kali Baru Barat (Indonesian)

Location
- Country: Indonesia
- State: Jakarta

Physical characteristics
- Source
  - location: Ci Sadane, West Java
- Mouth: Banjir Kanal Barat, Ci Liwung

The Baru Barat River (Indonesian: Kali Baru Barat, lit. 'Western New River') is a man-made canal flowing from the Cisadane River in Bogor Regency to Jakarta, Indonesia. It was one of two canals built in the 18th century under the order of the Governor-General Gustaaf Willem van Imhoff, the other being the Baru Timur River (Indonesian: Kali Baru Timur, lit. 'Eastern New River'). Both canals were originally built to transport agricultural harvests from Bogor to Batavia (now Jakarta). They are among the main rivers in Jakarta, and part of the Ciliwung Cisadane flood control project. The Baru Barat River flows through the districts of Pancoran and Tebet in South Jakarta and drains into the Banjir Kanal Barat.

== Etymology ==
The name Kali Baru ('New River') is associated with a fishing harbor in the Tanjung Priok area of North Jakarta. In the 1960s, a new harbor was established to replace the Kali Kresek Lahoa fishing harbor which closed in 1967. The area was divided into two parts: Kalibaru Timur ('Eastern Kali Baru') and Kalibaru Barat ('Western Kali Baru'). After the new fishing harbor was closed in 1988, the area was used for unloading lumber bound for Jakarta.

== History ==
In 1739, the Dutch East Indies government under Governor-General Gustaaf Willem van Imhoff built the Oosterslokkan (Dutch: Oosterslokkan, lit. 'Eastern Canal') for irrigation and for transporting goods inland. The canal was completed 14 years later, in 1753, but its use for transportation failed due to leaks and the high cost of building multiple water gates. The canal was used only for irrigation.

In 1753, the Oosterslokkan was lengthened to the eastern canal at Weltevreden (Lapangan Banteng) and joined the Prapatan Canal. These combined canals form what is now called the Baru Timur River. Due to high maintenance and repair costs, in 1776, Van Imhoff ordered the opening of another canal from the Cisadane River to the Ci Liwung. This new canal was named the Westerslokkan (Dutch: Westerslokkan, lit. 'Western Canal'), and is now called the Baru Barat River.

Geographically, the Baru Barat River (the western canal) was dug from the Cisadane River, passing the Cipakancilan River, into the Minangkabau River, and discharging into the Banjir Kanal Barat. The Baru Timur River (the eastern canal) was dug from Katulampa to Meester (Jatinegara) and receives additional water supply from the Cikeas River until the Sunter River.

The Baru Barat River helps irrigate rice and fruit fields in Cilebut, Citayam, Depok, Pondok Cina, Tanjung Barat, and Pondok Labu. It is no longer connected to the Ci Liwung.

== Hydrology ==
The Baru Barat River is grouped into the Central Area Stream Handling System of Jakarta, along with the Krukut River, Ci Liwung, and Banjir Kanal Barat. It has a total entry debit upstream of 50 m^{3}/sec and downstream of 290 m^{3}/sec, and an exit debit upstream of 150 m^{3}/sec and downstream of 370 m^{3}/sec, from about 17 tributaries.

In 2016, the river had a width of 3 m (9.8 ft) and looked clear. The depth reached only the toes during the dry season, but up to 1 m (3.3 ft) during the rainy season. The bottom and banks of the river were covered by green algae and wild bushes, giving a green tint to the river despite the transparent water.

The Baru Barat River is a source of flooding in Jakarta, mainly due to garbage accumulating in the river. In 2015, the government made noticeable progress in cleaning the river.

== Climate ==
The river flows in the northwest area of Java with a predominantly tropical rainforest climate (designated as Af in the Köppen-Geiger climate classification). The annual average temperature in the area is 27 °C. The warmest month is March, when the average temperature is around 30 °C, and the coldest is May, at 26 °C. The average annual rainfall is 3,674 mm (144.6 in). The wettest month is December, with an average of 456 mm (18.0 in) rainfall, and the driest is September, with 87 mm (3.4 in) rainfall.

== See also ==
- List of rivers of Java
- List of drainage basins of Indonesia
