= Porong River =

Coordinates: 7.5595°S 112.8574°E

Porong River Kali Porong, Sungai Porong, Kali Torong
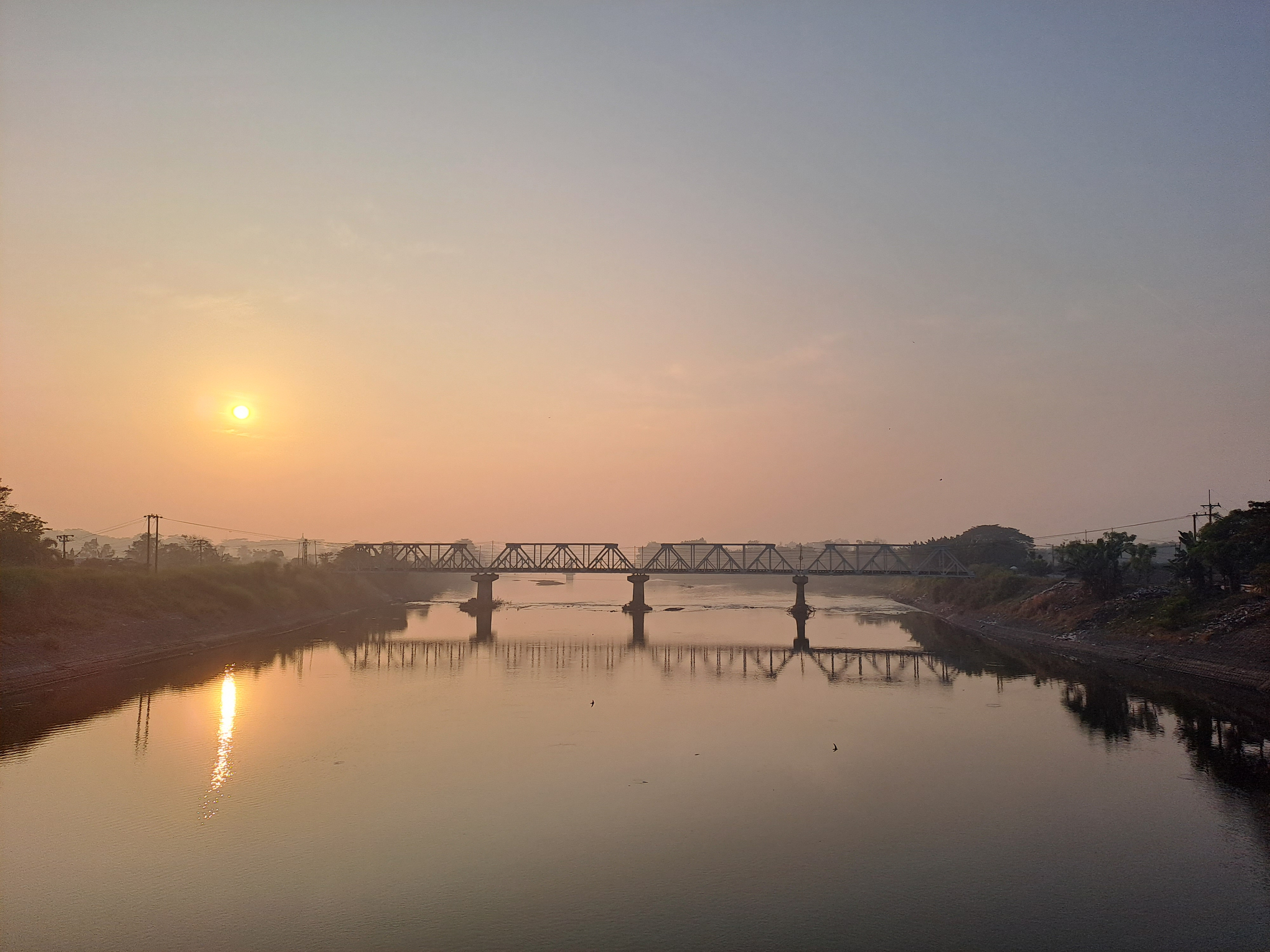

- Location of river mouth Porong River (Indonesia)

Location
- Country: Indonesia
- Province: East Java

Physical characteristics
- Source: Brantas River
  - location: Mojokerto
- Mouth
  - location: Madura Strait
  - elevation: 0 m (0 ft)
- Length: 13.5 km (8.4 mi)
- Basin size: 480 km^{2} (190 sq mi)

The Porong River is a river flowing through Sidoarjo, East Java, Indonesia, about 700 km east of the capital Jakarta. It is one of the main distributaries of the Brantas River that discharges into the Bali Sea, close to the Madura Strait, and is the main outlet for the Lusi mudflow.

== Geography ==
The river flows in the eastern area of Java with a predominantly tropical monsoon climate (designated as Am in the Köppen–Geiger climate classification). The annual average temperature in the area is 26 °C. The warmest month is October when the average temperature is around 28 °C, and the coldest is February, at 22 °C o average. The average annual rainfall is 2473 mm. The wettest month is January, with an average of 426 mm of rainfall, and the driest is August, with an average rainfall of 20 mm .

Porong River

Climate chart (precipitation, max. and min. temperature)
J	F	M	A	M	J	J	A	S	O	N	D
426 26 23	364 26 19	391 27 23	228 26 23	159 29 23	126 28 23	67 28 23	20 30 24	30 33 24	53 33 24	205 31 25	405 27 18
- █ Average max. and min. temperatures in °C
- █ Precipitation totals in mm
Imperial conversion
J	F	M	A	M	J	J	A	S	O	N	D
17 79 73	14 79 66	15 81 73	9 79 73	6.3 84 73	5 82 73	2.6 82 73	0.8 86 75	1.2 91 75	2.1 91 75	8.1 88 77	16 81 64
- █ Average max. and min. temperatures in °F
- █ Precipitation totals in inches

== See also ==
- List of drainage basins of Indonesia
- List of rivers of Indonesia
- List of rivers of Java
