= Kaso River (Garut) =

River in Indonesia

Kaso River Ci Kaso, Sungai Kaso, Tjikaso, Tji Kaso
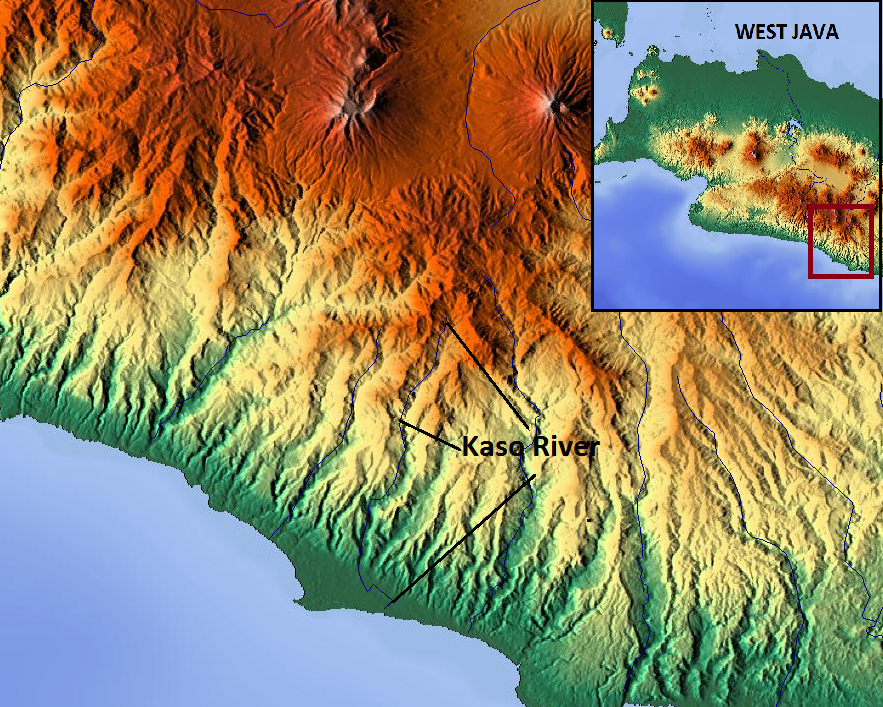

- Location of river mouth Kaso River (Garut) (Indonesia)

Location
- Country: Indonesia
- Province: West Java
- Regency: Garut

Physical characteristics
- Source: Southern West Java mountain ranges
  - location: Cisompet, Garut Regency
  - coordinates: 7.5483072°S 07.7994876°E
  - elevation: 300 m (980 ft)
- Mouth: Ci Palebuh River
  - location: Pameungpeuk, Garut Regency
  - elevation: 14 m (46 ft)
- Length: 2 km (1.2 mi)
- Basin size: 45 km^{2} (17 sq mi) (sub-basin of Cipalebuh basin)

Basin features
- River system: Cipalebuh basin (DAS210681)

The Kaso River, also Ci Kaso, is a river in the Garut Regency of West Java, Indonesia, about 190 km southeast of the capital Jakarta. Coal-bearing sandstones, clays and limestones are typical geological traits of the Bandung area of southern Java. The river flow merges with the Cipalebuh River, near the center of Pameungpeuk, southern coastal area of Garut, West Java.

== Geography ==
The river flows in the southwest area of Java with predominantly tropical rainforest climate (designated as Af in the Köppen-Geiger climate classification). annual average temperature in the area is 24 °C. warmest month is March, when the average temperature is around 25 °C, and the coldest is September, at 22 °C. average annual rainfall is about 3730 mm. wettest month is December, with an average of 542 mm rainfall, and the driest is September, with 61 mm rainfall.

== See also ==
- List of drainage basins of Indonesia
- List of rivers of Indonesia
- List of rivers of Java
