= Asem River =

River in Java, Indonesia

Ci Asem River Ci Asem, Sungai Ciasem, Ciasem, Tjiasem, Tji Asem
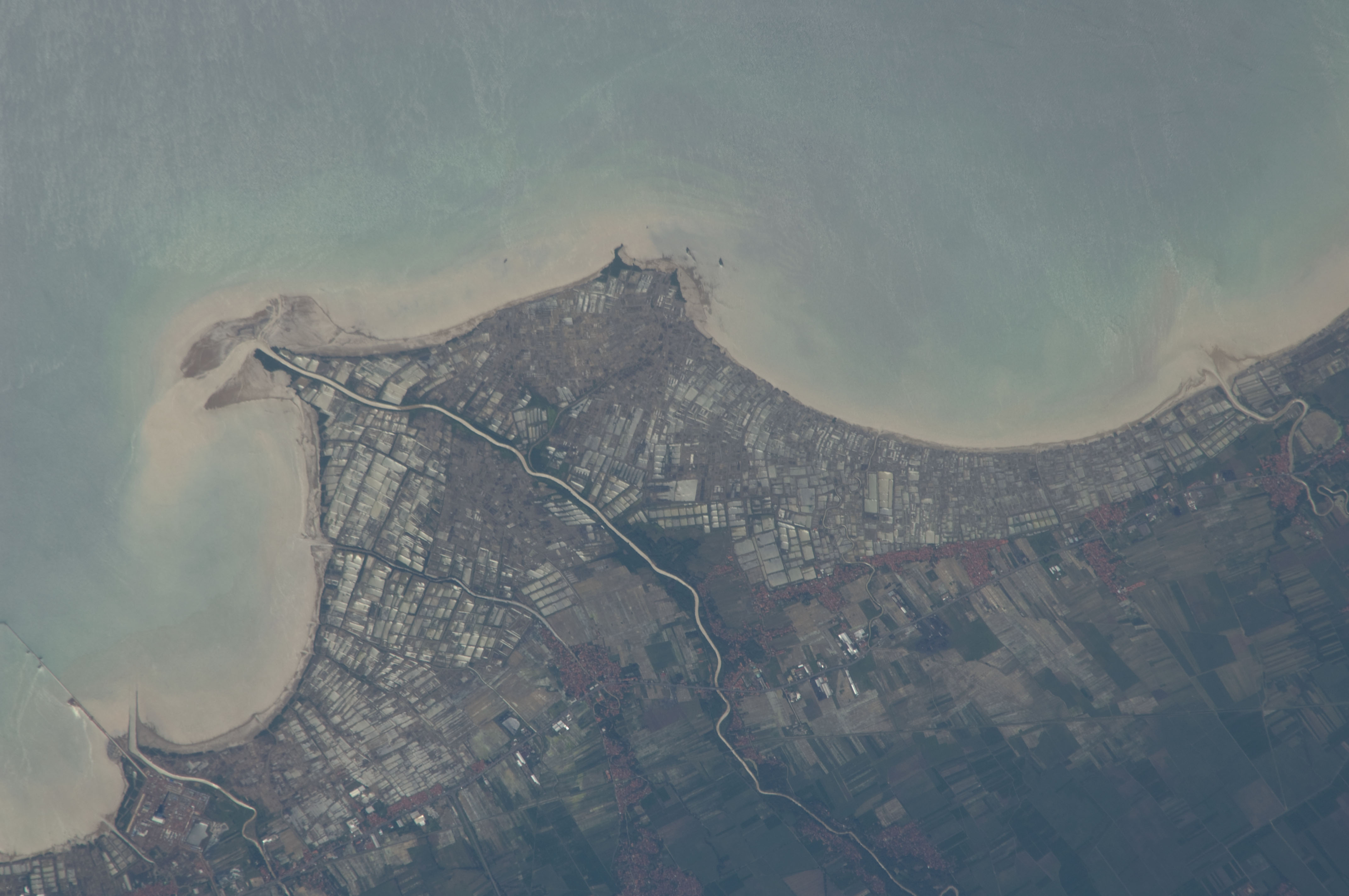
- Ciasem mouth

Location
- Country: Indonesia
- Province: West Java

Physical characteristics
- Source: Mount Tangkuban Perahu
  - location: Cicadas, Subang regency
  - coordinates: 6.748750°S 107.611500°E
- Mouth: Ciasem bay, (Java Sea)
  - location: Blanakan, Subang Regency
  - coordinates: 6.224475°S 107.695886°E
- Basin size: 745 km^{2} (288 sq mi)

Basin features
- River system: Ciasem basin
- Bridges: Pantura Ciasem bridge
- Basin management unit: BPDAS Citarum Ciliwung
- map shows the river source (green pin) near Lembang flowing northward and emptying into Ciasem Bay (blue pin) in the Java Sea.

Asem River (Ci Asem) is a river in northern West Java province on Java island, Indonesia. The river rises on Mount Tangkuban Perahu and discharges into the Bay of Ciasem, Java Sea, traversing Ciasem, Subang Regency, around 90 km east of the capital Jakarta.

== Hydrology ==
Asem River is one of the three main rivers in the Subang Regency. There are a total of 21 rivers and 61 tributaries in the watershed area of (Daerah Aliran Sungai/DAS) Ciasem of 745 km^{2}. Compared to the other two main rivers - Ci Punegara and Ci Lamaya - Asem River and its many tributaries all flow only within the Subang Regency. The river has a total length of 60 kilometer until the northern coast.

== Geography ==
The river flows in the northwest area of Java with a predominantly tropical monsoon climate (designated as Am in the Köppen-Geiger climate classification). The annual average temperature in the area is 25 °C. The warmest month is September when the average temperature is around 28 °C, and the coldest is July, at 24 °C. The average annual rainfall is 2810 mm. The wettest month is January, with an average of 454 mm of rainfall, and the driest is September, with 14 mm of rainfall.

== See also ==
- List of rivers of Indonesia
- List of rivers of Java
- List of drainage basins of Indonesia
