= Sanen River =

Coordinates: 8.3793°S 113.668°E

Sanen River Kali Sanen, Sungai Sanen
- Location of river mouth Sanen River (Indonesia)

Location
- Country: Indonesia

Physical characteristics
- Source
  - location: Java

Basin features
- River system: Mayang basin

The Sanen River is a river in southern East Java province, Java island, Indonesia, about 800 km east of the capital Jakarta. The Sanen River is a tributary of the Mayang River that flows into a cape in Watuulo, the southern coastal area of Java. The river originates in the southern mountainous region, near Mount Betiri.

== Geography ==
The river flows in the southeast area of Java with predominantly tropical monsoon climate (designated as Am in the Köppen–Geiger climate classification). The annual average temperature in the area is 22 °C. The warmest month is October, when the average temperature is around 23 °C, and the coldest is February, at 21 °C. The average annual rainfall is 2511 mm. The wettest month is January, with an average of 498 mm rainfall, and the driest is August, with 33 mm rainfall.

Sanen River

Climate chart (precipitation, max. and min. temperature)
| J | F | M | A | M | J | J | A | S | O | N | D |
| 498 23 20 | 287 22 20 | 318 22 21 | 211 23 21 | 147 25 20 | 105 24 20 | 115 24 20 | 33 25 19 | 37 26 19 | 78 26 20 | 261 25 19 | 421 24 19 |
- █ Average max. and min. temperatures in °C
- █ Precipitation totals in mm
Imperial conversion
| J | F | M | A | M | J | J | A | S | O | N | D |
| 20 73 68 | 11 72 68 | 13 72 70 | 8.3 73 70 | 5.8 77 68 | 4.1 75 68 | 4.5 75 68 | 1.3 77 66 | 1.5 79 66 | 3.1 79 68 | 10 77 66 | 17 75 66 |
- █ Average max. and min. temperatures in °F
- █ Precipitation totals in inches

== See also ==
- List of drainage basins of Indonesia
- List of rivers of Indonesia
- List of rivers of Java
- Meru Betiri National Park
