= Widas River =

River in Indonesia

Coordinates: 7°30′S 112°08′E

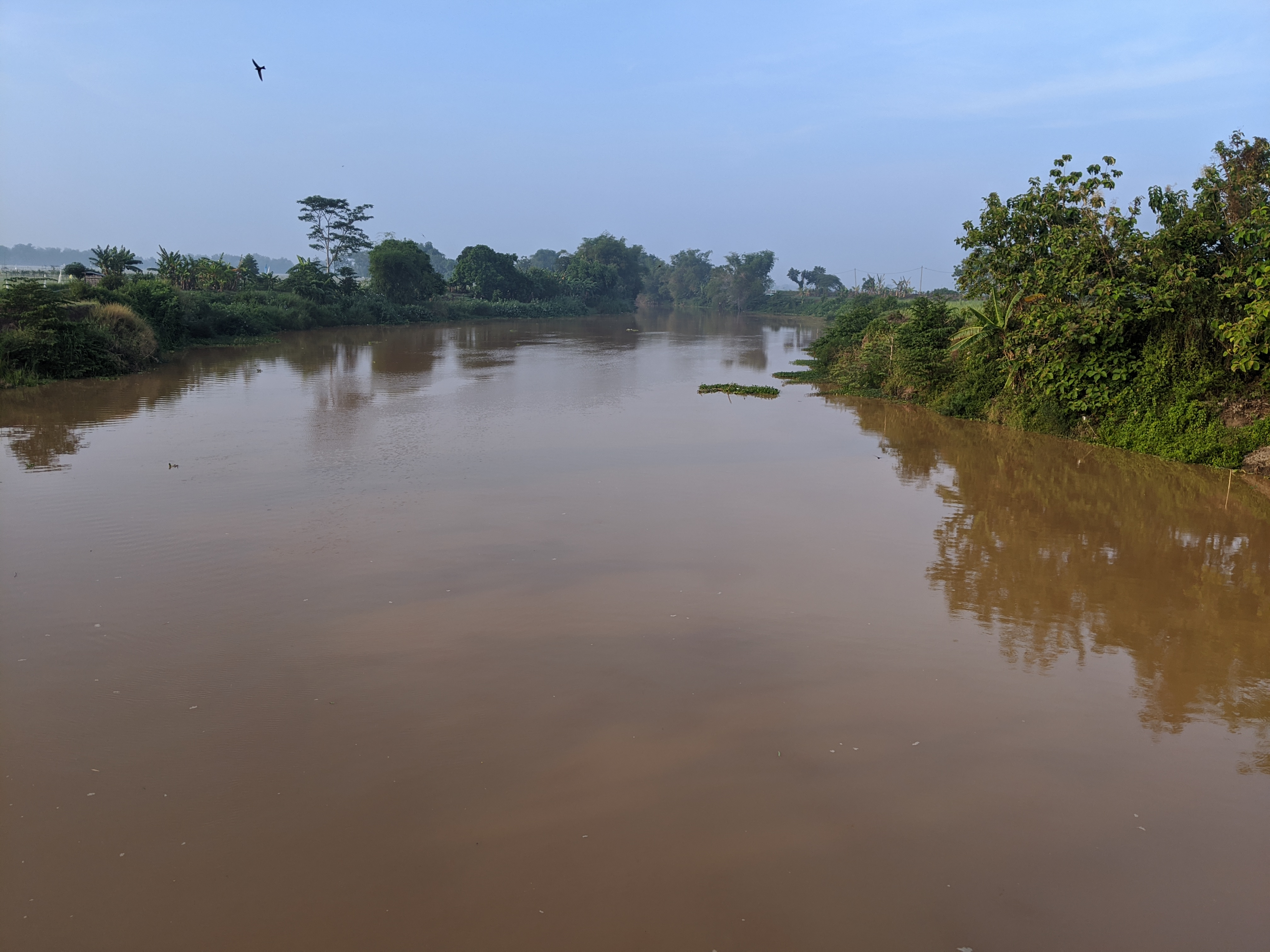

Location
- Country: Indonesia

Physical characteristics
- Source
  - location: East Java
- Mouth
  - location: Brantas River

The Widas River is a river in northern East Java, Indonesia. It is a tributary of the Brantas River.

== Geography ==
The river flows in the eastern area of Java with predominantly tropical monsoon climate (designated as Am in the Köppen–Geiger climate classification). The annual average temperature in the area is 26 °C. The warmest month is October, when the average temperature is around 29 °C, and the coldest is January, at 23 °C. The average annual rainfall is 2982 mm. The wettest month is March, with an average of 496 mm rainfall, and the driest is August, with 28 mm rainfall.

Widas River

Climate chart (precipitation, max. and min. temperature)
J	F	M	A	M	J	J	A	S	O	N	D
459 28 18	453 26 23	496 27 19	282 29 22	144 29 21	175 28 22	65 29 22	28 31 21	35 33 21	111 36 22	295 34 22	439 31 20
- █ Average max. and min. temperatures in °C
- █ Precipitation totals in mm
Imperial conversion
J	F	M	A	M	J	J	A	S	O	N	D
18 82 64	18 79 73	20 81 66	11 84 72	5.7 84 70	6.9 82 72	2.6 84 72	1.1 88 70	1.4 91 70	4.4 97 72	12 93 72	17 88 68
- █ Average max. and min. temperatures in °F
- █ Precipitation totals in inches

== See also ==
- List of drainage basins of Indonesia
- List of rivers of Indonesia
- List of rivers of Java
