= Grogol River =

River in Indonesia

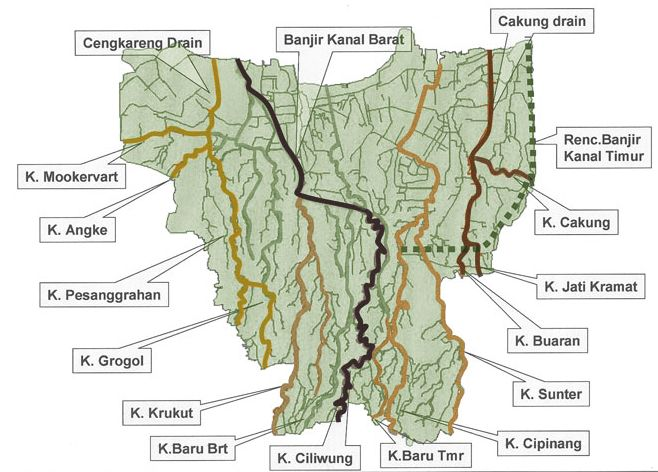
- Grogol River ("K. Grogol"), lower left in the map of rivers and canals of Jakarta (2012)

- Location of the mouth Grogol River (Indonesia)
- Native name: Kali Grogol (Indonesian)

Location
- Country: Indonesia
- State: Jakarta

Physical characteristics
- Source
  - location: Kedungbadak, Bogor, West Java
- Mouth: Angke River, Banjir Kanal Barat
  - coordinates: 06°08′10″S 106°47′07″E
- Length: 23.45 km (14.57 mi)

The Grogol River (Kali Grogol) is a small river in the western part of the Special Capital Region of Jakarta, Indonesia. The lower portions of the original river have been channelized with levees built along its banks, but flooding remains a real concern. Illegal buildings built along its banks were removed in 2014, and fifty-eight village families were provided with replacement housing, but most of them could not be accommodated.

== Course ==
The Grogol River arises around 06°33′39″S 106°47′26″E in Desa Kedungbadak and runs north between the Krukut River to the east and the Pasanggrahan River to the west, further north the Sekretaris River arises to the west. The Grogol passes through Desa Sukadamai and Desa Kencana. After crossing the Jakarta Outer Ring Road (Jalan Tol Lingkar Luar Jakarta) it follows parallel to and just east of Route 12. At 06°15′41″S 106°47′07″E there is an overflow channel that goes west to the Pasanggrahan River. The Grogol continues north through Senayan City and just west of Gelora Bung Karno Stadium. It serves as a drain for Palmerah Urban Village. Beginning at Bank Danamon Central Park it parallels Route 1 until 06°10′02″S 106°47′16″E where an overflow channel heads due west to join the Sekretaris River, while the channelized river continues beside Route 1 and flows into the Angke River at 06°08′10″S 106°47′07″E.

== Hydrology ==
The Grogol River has a length of 23.45 kilometres (14.57 mi), with the watershed area (Indonesian: Daerah Pengaliran Sungai) of 32.08 km^{2}. The average daily rainfall is 144 mm, with the peak flow rate at 290 m^{3} per second.

== Geography ==
The river flows in the northwest area of Java with predominantly tropical rainforest climate (designated as Af in the Köppen–Geiger climate classification). The annual average temperature in the area is 27 °C. The warmest month is March, when the average temperature is around 30 °C, and the coldest is May, at 26 °C. The average annual rainfall is 3674 mm. The wettest month is December, with an average of 456 mm rainfall, and the driest is September, with 87 mm rainfall.

== See also ==
- List of drainage basins of Indonesia
