= Setail River =

Coordinates: 8°30′S 114°21′E

Location
- Country: Indonesia

Physical characteristics
- Source
  - location: Mount Raung area, East Java
- Mouth
  - location: Strait of Bali

The Setail River is a river in southeastern Java, Indonesia.

== Geography ==
The river flows in the southeastern area of Java with predominantly tropical monsoon climate (designated as Am in the Köppen–Geiger climate classification). The annual average temperature in the area is 24 °C. The warmest month is October, when the average temperature is around 26 °C, and the coldest is July, at 22 °C. The average annual rainfall is 2160 mm. The wettest month is January, with an average of 475 mm rainfall, and the driest is August, with 31 mm rainfall.

== See also ==
- List of drainage basins of Indonesia
- List of rivers of Indonesia
- List of rivers of Java
