= Ci Kaengan =

River in Indonesia

Ci Kaengan Cikaengan Tjikaingan, Chi Kaengan Tji Kaingan, Ci Kaingan

Location
- Country: Indonesia
- State: Jawa Barat

Physical characteristics
- Source: Mount Cikuray
  - location: Banjarwangi, Garut Regency
  - coordinates: 7.32254°S 107.85987°E
- Mouth: Indian Ocean
  - coordinates: 7°43′54″S 107°54′35″E
- Basin size: 275 km^{2} (106 sq mi)

Basin features
- River system: DAS Cikaengan (DAS220667)
- Basin Management Authority: BPDAS Cimanuk-Citanduy
- Cikaingan River, estuary and its source.

Ci Kaengan (Cikaengan; Sundanese "Ci" means "river", so the whole name means "Kaengan River"; also written as “Ci Kaingan”; Indonesian: Sungai Cikaengan) is a river in the island of Java, Indonesia, that flows mainly in the Garut Regency of West Java province, about 210 km to the southeast of the capital Jakarta.

The river flows from Mount Cikuray and discharges into the Indian Ocean at the Cikaengan Beach of Garut Regency, at the border to the Tasikmalaya Regency. In 2016 two Microhydroelectric power stations were built utilizing this river producing about 12 megawatts of electricity.

The water debit is not quite large, but the water is relatively free from industrial pollution due to its situation in the traditional agricultural area. This led to the establishment of a river tubing attraction in the District of Banjarwangi.

== Geography ==
The river flows in the southwest area of Java with a predominantly tropical rainforest climate (designated as Af in the Köppen-Geiger climate classification). The annual average temperature in the area is 23 °C. The warmest month is April when the average temperature is around 24 °C, and the coldest is September, at 22 °C. The average annual rainfall is 3730 mm. The wettest month is December, with an average of 542 mm rainfall, and the driest is September, with 61 mm rainfall.

== Watershed ==
The watershed (Indonesian: Daerah aliran sungai or DAS) Cikaengan together with the Cilaki River form the Southern Watershed Area of Garut Regency, as it flows to the south. The rivers in the area are generally short, and narrow and with more valleys compared to the northern area (Cimanuk river flowing to the Sea of Java to the north).

Ci Kaengan has a total length of 55.5 km (34.5 mi) with several tributaries and watercourses through some districts of Garut Regency.

District	Watercourse	Length	
District	Watercourse	km	mi
Singajaya	Cijeruk	3.5	2.2
Singajaya	Cigarunggang	14.9	9.3
Singajaya	Citap	2.5	1.6
Singajaya	Ciujung	4.2	2.6
Singajaya	Cisinga	3.5	2.2
Singajaya	Cimanyal	3.0	1.9
Singajaya	Ciudian	12.5	7.8
Singajaya	Cilumbung	4.0	2.5
Singajaya	Cigangsa	4.2	2.6
Singajaya	Cipanyiriban	3.2	2.0
Cihurip; Cisompet	Citamiang	5.0	3.1
Cihurip; Cisompet	Cibentang	6.5	4.0
Cihurip; Cisompet	Cilimbung	7.0	4.3
Cihurip; Cisompet	Cibadak	6.5	4.0
Cihurip; Cisompet	Cibatu	3.0	1.9
Cihurip; Cisompet	Cipangramatan	5.8	3.6

== Microhydroelectric power stations ==
The flow that is seldom low during the dry season makes the river useful to develop into a micro-hydroelectric renewable energy source, Two projects have been started by some companies: PT Petro Hidro Optima (PLTM Cikaengan 5,1 MW), and PT Cikaengan Tirta Energi (PLTM Cikaengan 2 dengan daya 7,2 MW).

== Tourist attraction ==
A part of the river has been developed into “River Tubing Cikaengan” in the District of Banjarwangi, Garut Regency, since November 2016. The mid-level difficulty of the river boarding class allows safe use for novices.

== See also ==
- List of drainage basins of Indonesia
- List of rivers of Indonesia
- List of rivers of Java
