= Pemali River =

Coordinates: 6°46′S 109°04′E

Pemali River Sungai Pemali, Kali Pemali, Ci Pamali, Sungai Cipamali, Sungai Brebes, Kali Brebes
- Location of river mouth Pemali River (Indonesia)

Location
- Country: Indonesia
- Province: Central Java

Physical characteristics
- Source
  - location: Tuk Sirah, Brebes Regency Central Java
  - elevation: 420 m (1,380 ft)
- Mouth
  - location: Java Sea
- Length: 125.4 km (77.9 mi)
- Basin size: 1,276.4 km^{2} (492.8 sq mi)

Pemali River is a river in northern Central Java, Indonesia, about 250 km east of the capital Jakarta.

== Hydrology ==
The source of Pemali river originates in Winduaji village, Paguyangan district, Brebes Regency, with Tuk Sirah as the name of its spring. The Pemali River is the largest river in Brebes Regency with a length of approximately 125.4 km flowing from south, emptying north to Brebes delta by the Java Sea. The watershed area is 1,276.4 km^{2} (492.8 sq mi) comprising Brebes Regency and Tegal Regency

== Geography ==
The river flows in the central north area of Java with predominantly tropical monsoon climate (designated as Am in the Köppen-Geiger climate classification). The annual average temperature in the area is 25 °C. The warmest month is September, when the average temperature is around 28 °C, and the coldest is December, at 24 °C. The average annual rainfall is 2702 mm. The wettest month is December, with an average of 423 mm rainfall, and the driest is September, with 26 mm rainfall.

== See also ==
- List of drainage basins of Indonesia
- List of rivers of Indonesia
- List of rivers of Java
