= Buni River =

Buni River Cibuni, Tjibuni
- Native name: Ci Buni (Indonesian)

Location
- Country: Indonesia
- State: West Java
- Region: Cianjur Regency, Bandung Regency

Physical characteristics
- Source
  - location: Mount Patuha, West Java, Indonesia
  - elevation: 2,200 m (7,200 ft)
- Mouth: Indian Ocean
  - location: Sindangbarang, Indonesia
  - coordinates: 7.4359°S 106.7932°E
  - elevation: 1 m (3 ft 3 in)
- Length: 109 km (68 mi)
- Basin size: 1,435 km^{2} (554 sq mi)

Basin features
- River system: DAS Cibuni (DAS220718)
- Waterbodies: Situ Patenggang
- Basin Management Authority: BPDAS Citarum-Ciliwung
- Southern coast of Java. The mouth of the Cibuni (blue pin) and the location of Patenggang Lake (green pin) in the upper sub-basin in the Patuha valley.

Buni River (Indonesian: Ci Buni, Sungai Cibuni) is a river in southern West Java, Indonesia. The 109-km-long river flows in the Bandung and Cianjur regencies, with the upstream at the west slope of Mount Patuha and discharge into the Indian Ocean.

== Geography ==
The river flows in the southwest area of Java with a predominantly tropical rainforest climate (designated as Af in the Köppen-Geiger climate classification). The annual average temperature in the area is 18 °C. The warmest month is October when the average temperature is around 20 °C, and the coldest is August, at 18 °C. The average annual rainfall is 3766 mm. The wettest month is December, with an average of 570 mm of rainfall, and the driest is September, with 89 mm of rainfall.

== Hidrology ==
Ci Buni is the main river in the Cibuni River system, covering a total area of 1,435 km^{2} (554 mi^{2}) across three regencies, including Cianjur, Bandung, and Sukabumi . The upper part of the Cibuni Basin is adjacent to the upper part of the Citarum Basin in the north, where the flow of the Citarum River goes northward in Java and flows into the Java Sea. Meanwhile, the Cibuni Basin directs its stream southward and flows into the Indian Ocean.

The upstream is located in Rancabali of Bandung Regency, then it flows in the southwest direction to Pasirkuda, Tanggeung, Kadupandak, and Agrabinta (all in Cianjur Regency) then turns to the southeast passing Sindangbarang, Cianjur at the south coast of Java. The main tributaries of Ci Buni are:

1. Cijampang
2. Cilumut
3. Cibangoah
4. Cidolog
5. Cikarang
6. Cibalapulang

With the high rainfall between 2239 mm to 5579 mm, the river has high debit and a large watershed area for the population to be the source of drinking water, irrigation, and washing. Along the stream is a topical forest with diverse plants, fish, birds, boars, apes, wild cats, and reptiles. Closer to the ocean, the river mouth widens to almost 200 m and hosts sweet water crocodiles.

== See also ==
- Catchment hydrology
- Drainage divide
- Drainage basins of the South Coast of Java
- List of rivers of Java
- List of rivers of Indonesia
- List of drainage basins of Indonesia
