= Bodri River =

River in Java, Indonesia

Bodri River Kali Bodri, Sungai Lutut
- Bodri Bridge of the Semarang-Cheribon Steam Tram Company (SCS) at Kendal

Location
- Country: Indonesia
- Province: Central Java

Physical characteristics
- Source: North East Dieng Volcanic Complex and a small part of the slopes of Mount Sundoro
  - location: Temanggung Regency
- 2nd source: West part of Mount Ungaran
  - location: Kendal Regency and smal part of Semarang Regency
- Mouth: Java Sea
  - location: Semarang
  - coordinates: 6.8532°S 110.1755°E
- Basin size: 653 km^{2} (252 sq mi)

Basin features
- River system: DAS Bodri (DAS220134)
- Waterbodies: Bendung Juwero
- Waterfalls: Curug Klenting Kuning
- Bridges: North Kali Bodri Bridge; South Kali Bodri Bridge; Oude Indië Spoorbrug
- Basin Management Authority: BPDAS Pemali-Jratun
- Location of the mouth of the Kali Bodri (M-blue pin), green pins mark the location of (left to right) Dieng volcanic complex, Mount Sindoro and Mount Ungaran.

The Bodri River is a river in Kendal Regency, northern Central Java, Indonesia. The Bodri River flows from the south to north into the Java Sea.

== Geography ==
The river flows along the central north area of Java with a predominantly tropical monsoon climate. The annual average temperature in the area is 25 °C. The warmest month is October when the average temperature is around 28 °C, and the coldest is January, at 24 °C. The average annual rainfall is 3459 mm. The wettest month is January, with an average of 713 mm of rainfall, and the driest is September, with 33 mm of rainfall.

== Hydrology ==
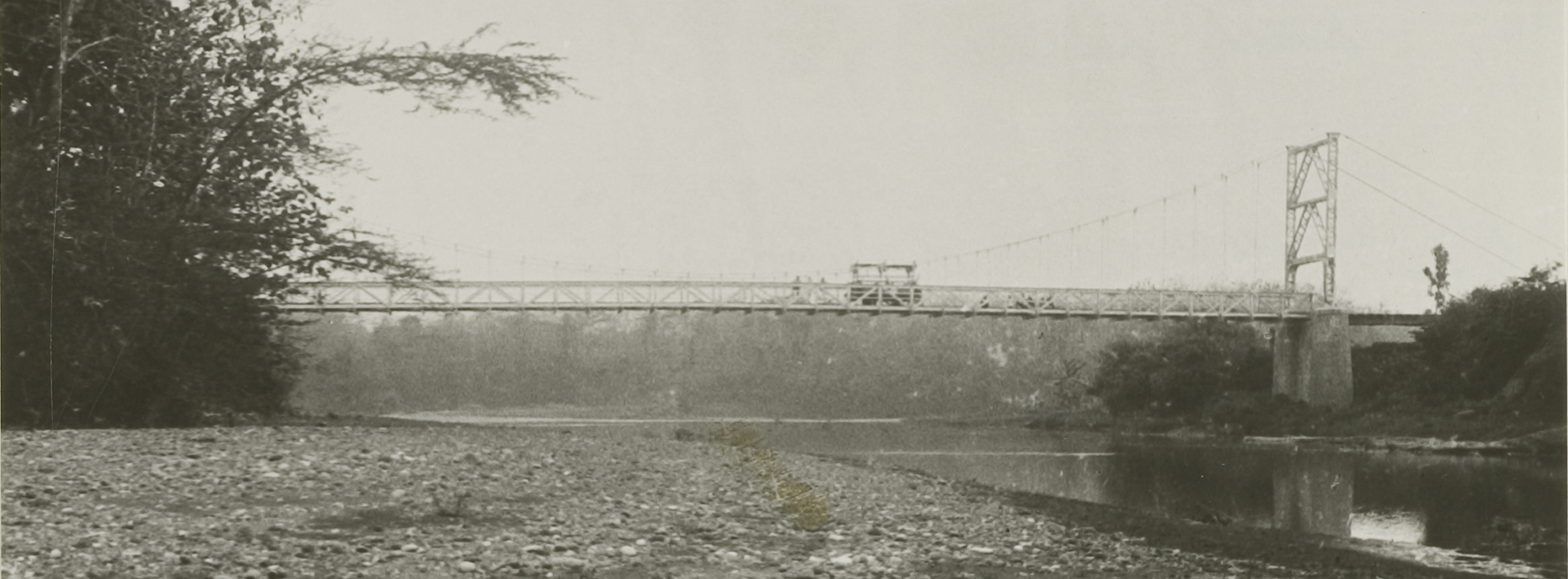
First cable bridge over the kali Bodri, Central Java

The Bodri River rises in the North Serayu Mountains from Mount Sundoro (3,150 m) at the village of Canggal, Candiroto District, Temanggung Regency. It also receives streams from the north slope of Mount Prahu (2,590 m) at Dieng Plateau, Mount Beser (1,036 m), Mount Kepiting (1,169 m), and also from Mount Ungaran (2,050 m) in Semarang Regency. The upstream in Temanggung Regency is called the "Lutut River" (Sungai Lutut). The river discharges into the Java Sea.

The river flows through two regencies: Temanggung Regency at the upstream and Kendal Regency in the middle and the downstream. In Temanggung Regency, this river traverses the districts of Candiroto, Bejen, and Gemawang. In Kendal Regency, it crosses the districts of Singorojo, Patean, Pegandon, Gemuh, Cepiring, and Patebon. The basin size (Indonesian: Daerah aliran sungai or "DAS") of Bodri until the river mouth is about 653 km^{2} (252 sq mi), divided into 5 sub-DAS: Sub-DAS Lutut, Sub-DAS Logung, Sub-DAS Putih, Sub-DAS Blorong and Sub-DAS Bodri Hilir, comprising 4 regencies: Temanggung Regency (4 districts), Kendal Regency (12 districts), Semarang Regency (1 district) and 2 districts in the City of Semarang.

=== Tributaries ===
Some main tributaries of the Bodri River are:

- Penggung River
- Logung River
- Ringin River
- Kaliputih River
- Kalipupu River
- Lowungu River
- Trocoh River
- Manggung River

== Use ==
The inhabitants along the Bodri River use the water for fisheries, either by traditional fishing or with nets. The high discharge of the river is also used for irrigation passing some dams, such as Juwero Dam at the border of Wonosari village, Pegandon District, with Triharjo village, Gemuh District, Kendal Regency. In the river mouth area it has a port for the fishermen in the north coast with a fish auction place. There is a tourist attraction "Curug Guwung" at the upstream of the Bodri River, at the Gunungpayung village, Candiroto District, Temanggung Regency

== See also ==
- List of drainage basins of Indonesia
- List of rivers of Java
