= Laki River =

Coordinates: 7.5055°S 107.423°E

Laki River Ci Laki, Sungai Cilaki, Sungai Laki, Tjilaki, Tji Laki, Tjilati
- Location of river mouth Laki River (Indonesia)

Location
- Country: Indonesia
- Province: West Java

Physical characteristics
- Source
  - location: Java

The Laki River (in Indonesian meaning Man River) is a river in southern Java, Indonesia, about 160 kilometres (99 mi) south of the capital Jakarta. This river is the natural boundary between the Cianjur and Garut regencies.

== Geography ==
The river flows in the southwest area of Java with predominantly tropical rainforest climate (designated as Af in the Köppen–Geiger climate classification). The annual average temperature in the area is 23 °C. The warmest month is August, when the average temperature is around 26 °C, and the coldest is June, at 24 °C. The average annual rainfall is 4,032 millimetres (158.7 in). The wettest month is December, with an average of 553 millimetres (21.8 in) rainfall, and the driest is September, with 72 millimetres (2.8 in) rainfall.

== See also ==
- List of drainage basins of Indonesia
- List of rivers of Indonesia
- List of rivers of Java
