= Mount Halimun =

Mountain in Indonesia

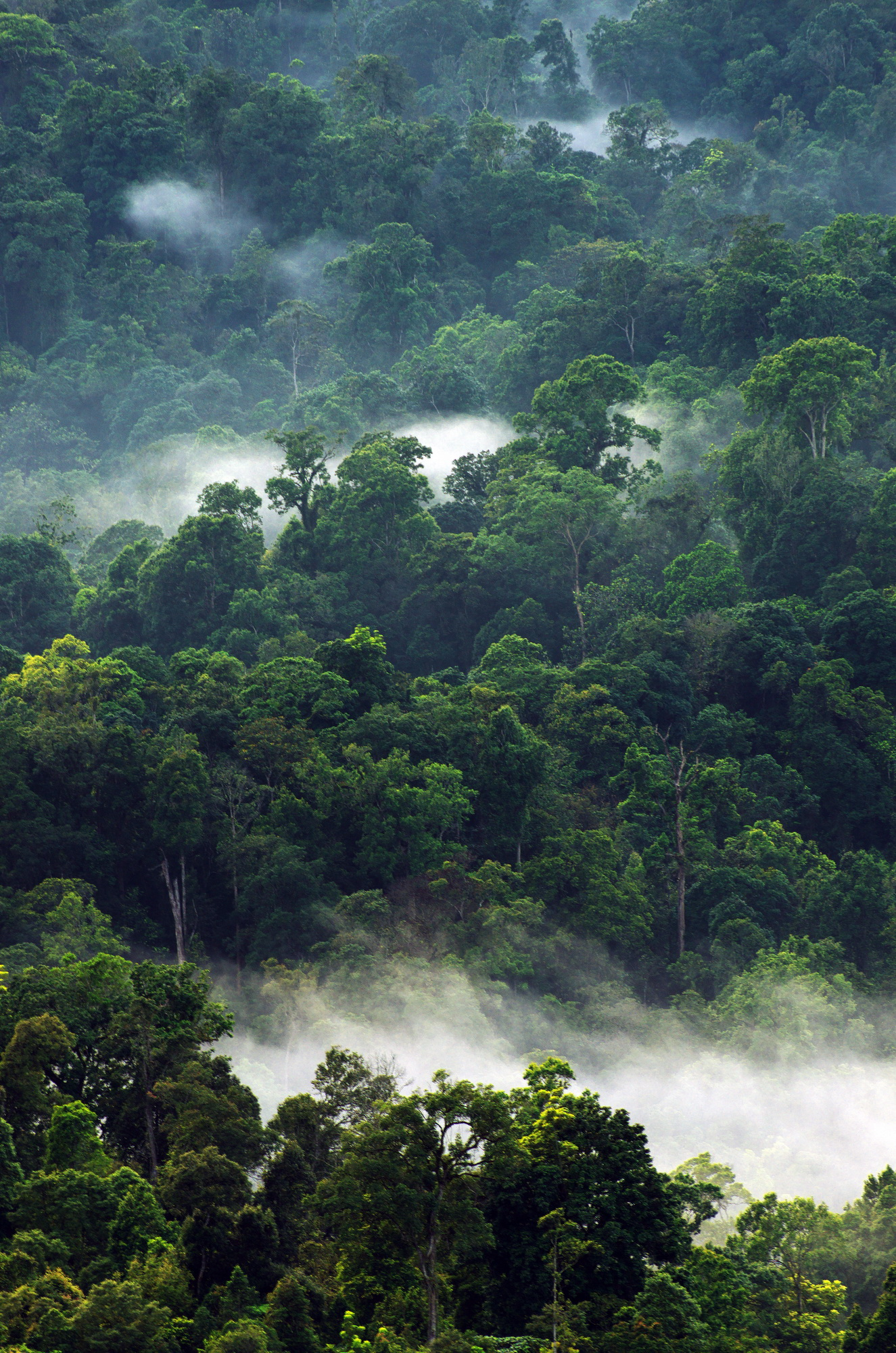
- Rainforest on the mountain.

Highest point
- Elevation: 1,929 m (6,329 ft)
- Prominence: 938 m (3,077 ft)
- Coordinates: 6°42′37″S 106°27′05″E

Naming
- Native name: Gunung Halimun (Indonesian)

Geography
- Location within Java

Geology
- Mountain type: Stratovolcano

Mount Halimun (Indonesian: Gunung Halimun) is a mountain in the island of Java, Indonesia. It is protected by the Mount Halimun Salak National Park. It is Banten's highest point.

== Location ==
Mount Halimun is in the volcanic belt of the Bandung Zone. It is a stratovolcano formed during the Pleistocene. It is on the border between Banten province and West Java province. The summit, North Halimun, has an elevation of 1,929 metres (6,329 ft) and a prominence of 938 metres (3,077 ft).

== Environment ==
The mountain lies within the largest area of primary rainforest in Java. The word Halimun means "foggy" or "misty" in the Sundanese language, and is given to two of the peaks in the national park, but is commonly applied to the higher north peak. Much of the forest on the mountain is almost always enclosed in cloud. The Ci Durian river rises on the slopes of the mountain and flows northward through the Banten region. The Cisadane river also rises in the park. The park is a critical area for survival of the silvery gibbon.

== Climbing ==
A permit is required to enter the Mount Halimun Salak National Park. From the village of Leuwijamang, to the north of the mountain at an elevation of 800 metres (2,600 ft), it takes about 8 hours to hike to the summit and back. Technically the route to the summit is not considered an "official climbing lane" by the National Park, so climbing is not allowed.

== Sources ==
- Atsushi Ota (21 November 2014), "Toward a Transborder, Market-Oriented Society. Changes in the Hinterlands of Banten, c.1760–1790", Hinterlands and Commodities: Place, Space, Time and the Political Economic Development of Asia over the Long Eighteenth Century, BRILL, ISBN 978-90-04-28390-9
- Bemmelen, Reinout Willem van (1970), The Geology of Indonesia, Nijhoff
- "halimun (north)", Gunung Bagging, 16 June 2016
- Siebert, Lee; Simkin, Tom; Kimberly, Paul (9 February 2011), Volcanoes of the World: Third Edition, University of California Press, ISBN 978-0-520-94793-1
- Whitten, Tony; Soeriaatmadja, Roehayat Emon; Afiff, Suraya A. (5 February 2013), The Ecology of Java and Bali, Tuttle Publishing, ISBN 978-1-4629-0504-1
