= Beet River =

River in Java, Indonesia

Coordinates: 6.27639°S 107.26583°E

Beet River Ci Beet, Sungai Cibeet, Tjibeet, Tji Beet, Tji Behet
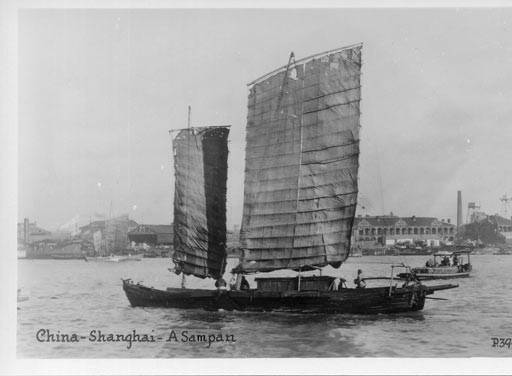

- Location of river mouth Beet River (Indonesia)

Location
- Country: Indonesia

Physical characteristics
- Source
  - location: West Java
- Mouth: Citarum River

Beet River is a river in northern West Java, Indonesia. It is a tributary of the Citarum River.

== Geography ==
The river flows in the southwest area of Java with a predominantly tropical rainforest climate (designated as Af in the Köppen-Geiger climate classification). The annual average temperature in the area is 26 °C. The warmest month is October when the average temperature is around 28 °C, and the coldest is January, at 25 °C. The average annual rainfall is 2970 mm. The wettest month is December, with an average of 475 mm of rainfall, and the driest is September, with 22 mm of rainfall.

== See also ==
- List of rivers of Indonesia
- List of rivers of Java
- List of drainage basins of Indonesia
