= Krukut River =

River in Indonesia

Krukut River Kali Cideng, Kali Krukut Satu, Kali Kroekoet, Kali Kruukut, Sungai Krukut
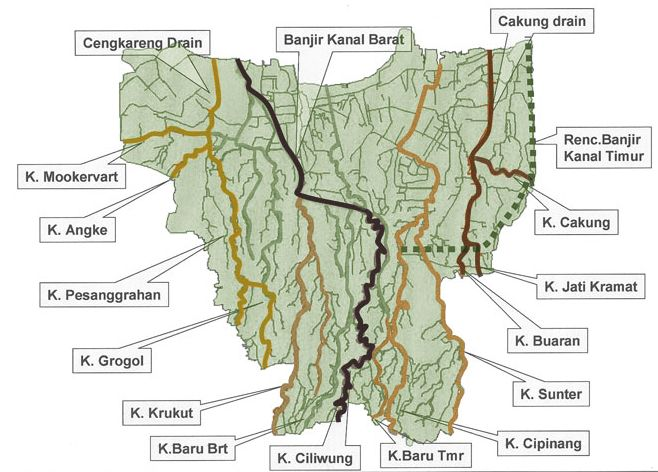
- Krukut River ("K. Krukut"), lower left in the map of rivers and canals of Jakarta (2012)

- Location of the mouth Krukut River (Indonesia)
- Native name: Kali Krukut (Indonesian)

Location
- Country: Indonesia
- State: Jakarta

Physical characteristics
- Source
  - location: Depok, West Java
- Mouth: Banjir Kanal Barat, Ci Liwung
  - coordinates: 6°11′59″S 106°48′41″E
- Length: 31.39 km (19.50 mi)

The Krukut River is a river flowing in Jakarta originating in Bogor Regency. In the past the river was clean and one of the tourist attractions during the Dutch East Indies administration, but due to denser housing on the banks and lack of maintenance, the water turned dark and filled with trash, causing routine flooding in rainy seasons.

== Etymology ==
"Krukut" is the name of a neighborhood in the district of Taman Sari, West Jakarta, located between two rivers: Ci Liwung and Cideng (later known as "Kali Krukut"). Old tales give multiple versions of the etymology of the name. It may originate from the word "krokot" in the Betawi language, denoting a "very frugal" lifestyle, which was applied to a community of Arab people living in the area, as "Arab Krukut", until this day. Another version refers to the Dutch word "kerkhof" (meaning "cemetery"), which was transliterated in the Betawi tongue as "Krukut", which points to many cemeteries for local Betawi people around this area in the past.

== History ==
The Krukut River is upstream at Situ Citayam, Depok, West Java, and today it ends near the Karet area, merging into "Banjir Kanal Barat", with a total length of 84.4 kilometer, of which about 30 kilometer is the main river. The downstream of the Krukut River has caused severe flooding in Jakarta since 1890. The intermittent widening, digging, and straightening of the flow in the decades managed to partially tame some parts. However, in August 2016, the luxurious and also iconic area of South Jakarta, Kemang, was inundated by the overflow of Krukut after some protecting walls were damaged due to unprecedented high discharge. Other incidents were regularly reported from Kebalen to Pondok Labu in South Jakarta.

In the early 1970s, the width of Krukut was about 25 meter, and deeper than normal human height. Its flow was a source of irrigation for rice fields and fish farming. No housing was allowed to be built as this was a designated water flow area. However, since then many buildings have been illegally erected along the banks, and people have thrown household trash in the river, even after the cleaning in 2017, the width of Krukut became as narrow as 1.5 meter at some points (according to Iskandar, the head of Balai Besar Wilayah Sungai Ciliwung-Cisadane/BBWSCC).

A small stream of Krukut reappears about 300 meter from the confluence with Banjir Kanal Barat, at the administrative village of Kebon Melati, with a width of 3 meter, known locally as "Old Krukut" ("Krukut Lama") or "Lower Krukut" ("Krukut Bawah"). This stream meanders 31.4 kilometer before merging into Kali Pakin at Krukut area, West Jakarta, then into "Kali Besar" and finally reaching the Pluit Dam at Pintu Air Pasar Ikan, indirectly discharged into Jakarta Bay.

== Hydrology ==
The Krukut River has a length of 31.39 kilometres (19.50 mi), with a watershed area (Indonesian: Daerah Pengaliran Sungai) of 84.99 km^{2}. The average daily rainfall is 129 mm, with the peak discharge at 135 m³.

== Geography ==
The river flows in the northwest area of Java with a predominantly tropical rainforest climate (designated as Af in the Köppen-Geiger climate classification). The annual average temperature in the area is 27 °C. The warmest month is March, when the average temperature is around 30 °C, and the coldest is May, at 26 °C. The average annual rainfall is 3674 mm. The wettest month is December, with an average of 456 mm of rainfall, and the driest is September, with 87 mm of rainfall.

== Normalisation ==
The normalisation of the Krukut River started in the era of Governor Ali Sadikin, 1966–1977, to include the straightening of the flow, cutting problematic river bends, and removing small sedimentation islands in the stream. This project was part of a flood handling strategy, involving the removal of some 8,000 people from the housing on the river banks of Kali Krukut Cideng canal (Kompas, 21 February 1971).

In 2010, the government ordered the digging of the river, removing 1000 cubic meter of mud in a stretch of 1.1 km. This was accompanied by cleaning the blocked drains and educating local people about sanitary and river maintenance. The government of Jakarta also vowed to evict luxury houses that illegally occupied the designated open green space along the Krukut river banks, which was caused by a heavy flood in Kemang and its surroundings in August 2016. It was reported that the width of the Krukut River has decreased from 20 meter to only 4-5 meter due to the illegal buildings.

Until 2017, the river has been normalised by BBWSCC from Rengas Bridge to Jalan Kebalen V in Kuningan.

== See also ==
- List of drainage basins of Indonesia
- List of rivers of Java
- List of rivers of Jakarta
