= Liman River =

Coordinates: 6°29′S 105°48′E

Liman River Ci Liman, Ciliman, Chiliman River, Tji Liman, Tjiliman, Tjitiman, Tjillman River
- Location of the river mouth Liman River (Indonesia)

Location
- Country: Indonesia
- Province: Banten

Physical characteristics
- Source: southern mountains of Banten
  - location: Cirinten, Lebak
- Mouth: Teluk Lada (Pepper bay), Sunda Strait
  - location: Panimbang
- Basin size: 503 km^{2} (194 mi^{2})

Basin features
- River system: Ciliman basin

Liman river or Ci Liman is the name of a river located at the western tip of Java Island, Banten Province, Indonesia. It originates from its headwaters in the southern mountains of Banten, around the Sareweh in the Lebak Regency, near the settlement of the Baduy Dalam tribe. It flows westward towards the coast in the Panimbang, region of Pandeglang and empties into Lada Bay, the Sunda Strait. It is approximately 73 km from the center of Cilegon city to the mouth of the river.

Ci Liman is the main stem in the Ciliman River basin system, which covers a n area of approximately 503 km^{2} (194 sq mi).

== Geography ==
The river flows in the southwest area of Java with predominantly tropical rainforest climate (designated as Af in the Köppen-Geiger climate classification). The annual average temperature in the area is 24 °C. The warmest month is August when the average temperature is around 26 °C, and the coldest is December, at 23 °C. The average annual rainfall is 3999 mm. The wettest month is December, with an average of 567 mm rainfall, and the driest is September, with 72 mm rainfall.

== See also ==
- Baduy people
- Cihara River
- Krakatoa
- List of drainage basins of Indonesia
- List of rivers of Indonesia
- List of rivers of Banten
- Ujung Kulon National Park
