= Comal River (Indonesia) =

River in Indonesia

Sungai Comal Kali Comal, Kali Tjomal
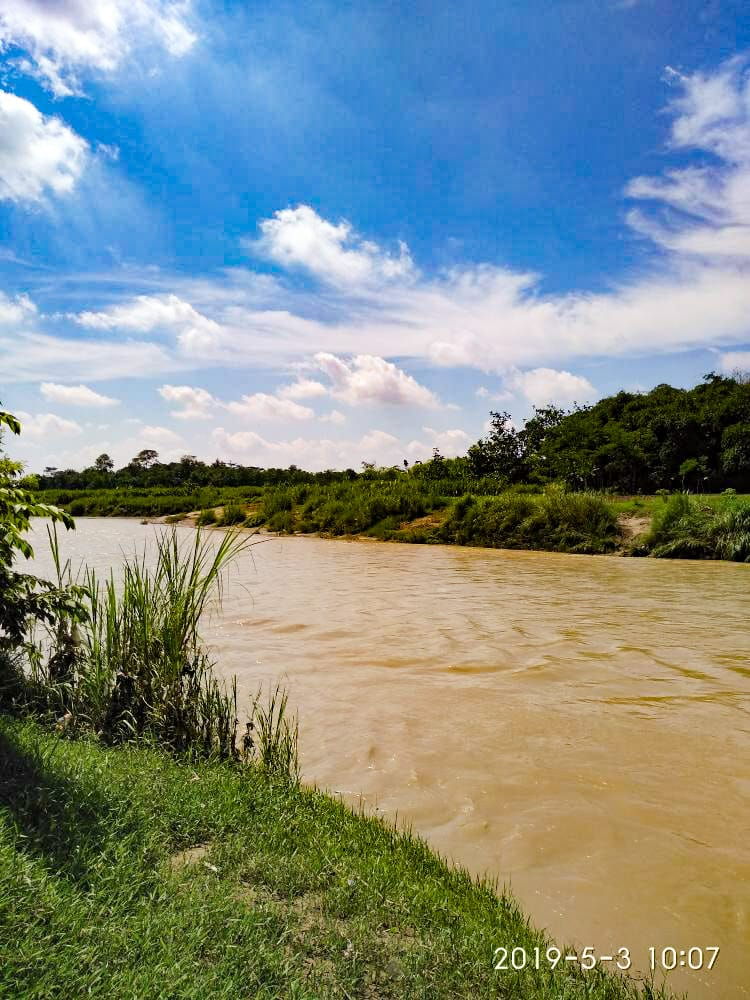

- Location of river mouth

Location
- Country: Indonesia
- Province: Jawa Tengah

Physical characteristics
- Source: Gunung Slamet
- Mouth: Laut Jawa
  - coordinates: 6.7767°S 109.5217°E
- Length: 109.18 km (67.84 mi)
- Basin size: 822 km^{2} (317 sq mi)

Basin features
- River system: Comal basin
- Basin Management: BPDAS Pemali-Jratun

The Comal River is a river in Jawa Tengah, Indonesia. It rises in the North Serayu Mountains from Mount Slamet. The river has a length of around 109.18 km flowing from south to north, ending in Java Sea. It is the largest river in Pemalang Regency, Central Java, and flows through seven districts within that regency.

== Geography ==
The river flows along the central north area of Java with a predominantly tropical monsoon climate. The annual average temperature in the area is 25 °C. The warmest month is September, when the average temperature is around 29 °C, and the coldest is March, at 22 °C. The average annual rainfall is 2758 mm. The wettest month is January, with an average of 492 mm rainfall, and the driest is September, with 23 mm rainfall.

== Hydrology ==
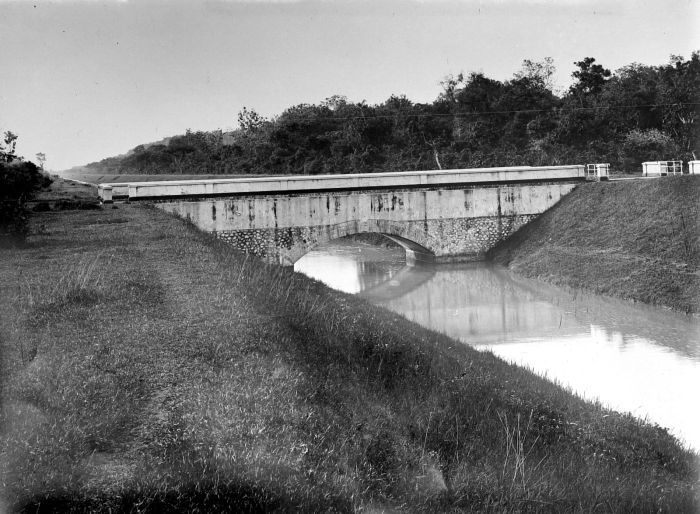
A bridge and aqueduct crossing the secondary canal leading to the main stream of the Comal River (Dutch Colonial picture, 19th–20th century)

The Comal River is the main stream in the drainage basin (Indonesian: daerah aliran sungai (DAS) Comal covering an area of 822 km^{2} (317 sq mi) which comprises three administrative regencies: Pemalang, Tegal and Pekalongan. The upstream is located at the border between the villages of Batursari and Penakir in the district of Pulosari and flowing to Java Sea.

=== Tributaries ===
Some main tributaries of the Comal River are:

- Paingen River
- Gronggang River
- Paku River
- Wakung River
- Lumeneng River
- Polaga River
- Layangan River
- Keruh River

== Uses ==
The inhabitants along the Comal River use the water for agriculture and fisheries, either by traditional fishing or with nets. The downstream is wide enough for small fishermen's boats to sail. The high discharge of the river is used for irrigation passing some gates or dams, such as Mejagong and Sukowati Dams. The downstream area is a popular destination for rafting.

== See also ==
- List of drainage basins of Indonesia
- List of rivers of Java
- List of rivers of Indonesia
