= Ci Manceuri =

River in Indonesia

Ci Manceuri Tjimantjeuri, Tji Mantjeuri
- Location in Java

Location
- Country: Indonesia

Physical characteristics
- Source
  - location: Java
- Mouth
  - location: Java Sea
  - coordinates: 6°02′18″S 106°27′31″E

The Ci Manceuri, or Cimanceuri, (Note: The river's name is also written as Tji Mantjeuri or Tjimantjeuri) is a river in the Banten province of western Java, Indonesia.

== Location ==
The Ci Manceuri forms at the confluence of the Ci Dangdeur and Ci Jengir and flows northwest and then north to discharge into the Java Sea near Lontar, Kemiri District in the Tangerang Regency. The rivers in Banten, the westernmost province of Java, run roughly parallel to each other. The main ones are the Peteh, called the Banten on the lower reaches near the city of Kota Banten, the Ujung, which enters the sea at Pontang, the Durian, which enters the sea at Tanara, the Manceuri, and the Sadane, which rises in the mountainous region of Priyangan and 1682 formed the border between the Dutch East India Company (VOC) territory and Batavia (modern Jakarta). The Durian, Manceuri, and Sadane rivers flow through the Tangerang Plain. The rivers fan out into deltas near the coast. There are marshes between the mouth of the Durian at Tanara and the mouth of the Sadane.

== Irrigation works ==
The Tangerang Plain was still owned by private landlords in the early 20th century. The farmers grew low-quality rice, mostly using rainfall-based water storage and irrigation systems that depended on the whims of landlords for the functioning of key components, with arbitrary water distribution. They suffered from poverty and famine or food shortages.

In 1911 the colonial government started to prepare an irrigation plan, and in 1914 determined that various tracts in the plain should be subject to compulsory purchase for this purpose. The original plan was to use waters from the Ci Durian, Ci Manceuri, and Ci Sadane rivers. Plans to use the Cimanceuri were dropped due to its irregular supply and poor quality water. In 1919 a plan was issued where the north of the plain would be irrigated by the Ci Sadane and the southern area by the Ci Durian. In this plan, the Ci Durian canal would extend to the Ci Manceuri. Later this was changed to extend the canal by an aqueduct over the Ci Manceuri.

Planned extensions to the Ci Durian irrigation network were delayed in the post-colonial era, as were repairs to the existing works. The planned aqueduct over the Ci Manceuri was not completed until the 1970s.

== Geography ==
The river flows in the northeastern part of Java with a predominantly tropical rainforest climate (designated as Af in the Köppen-Geiger climate classification). The annual average temperature in the area is 26 °C. The warmest month is September when the average temperature is around 28 °C, and the coldest is March, at 24 °C. The average annual rainfall is 3471 mm. The wettest month is February, with an average of 429 mm of rainfall, and the driest is September, with 116 mm of rainfall.

== See also ==
- List of rivers of Indonesia
- List of drainage basins of Indonesia

== Sources ==
- Jakarta, Bogor, Depok, Tangerang, Bekasi, Puncak dan Cianjur Arahan Sistem Air Baku dan Pengendalian Banjir (in Indonesian), Badan Koordinasi Tata Ruang Nasional Penataan Ruang Kawasan
- Kop, Jan; Ravesteijn, Wim; Kop, Kasper (2016), Irrigation Revisited: An Anthology of Indonesian-Dutch Cooperation, Eburon Uitgeverij B.V., ISBN 978-94-6301-028-3
- Talens, Johan (1999), Een feodale samenleving in koloniaal vaarwater: Staatsvorming, koloniale expansie en economische onderontwikkeling in Banten, West Java (1600–1750) (in Dutch), Uitgeverij Verloren, ISBN 90-6550-067-7
