= Lusi River =

Coordinates: 7°05′S 110°55′E

Lusi River Kali Lusi, Sungai Lusi
- Location of river mouth Lusi River (Indonesia)

Location
- Country: Indonesia

Physical characteristics
- Source
  - location: Java
- Mouth: Serang River
  - location: Purwodadi
- Length: 208.5 km (129.6 mi)
- Basin size: 3,656.78 km^{2} (1,411.89 sq mi)

Lusi River is a river in northern Central Java, Indonesia, about 400 km east of the capital Jakarta. It is a tributary of the Serang River, meeting after passing the city of Purwodadi.

== Hydrology ==
Lusi River is one of the longest in Central Java, with a length of 208.5 km and the basin size of 3656.78 km².

== Geography ==
The river flows in the central area of Java with predominantly tropical monsoon climate (designated as Am in the Köppen-Geiger climate classification). The annual average temperature in the area is 25 °C. The warmest month is October, when the average temperature is around 28 °C, and the coldest is January, at 24 °C. The average annual rainfall is 2845 mm. The wettest month is January, with an average of 527 mm rainfall, and the driest is September, with 35 mm rainfall.

== See also ==
- List of drainage basins of Indonesia
- List of rivers of Indonesia
- List of rivers of Java
