= Serang River =

Coordinates: 6.7055°S 110.6159°E

Serang River Kali Serang, Sungai Serang, Kali Werang
- Location of river mouth Serang River (Indonesia)

Location
- Country: Indonesia

Physical characteristics
- Source: Mount Merbabu
  - location: Central Java
- Mouth
  - location: Jepara Regency

Serang River is a river in northern Central Java, Indonesia, about 400 km east of the capital Jakarta. The largest tributary is Lusi River, which discharges into Serang River after passing the city of Purwodadi.

== Geography ==
The river flows in the central area of Java with predominantly tropical monsoon climate (designated as Am in the Köppen-Geiger climate classification). The annual average temperature in the area is 25 °C. The warmest month is October, when the average temperature is around 28 °C, and the coldest is January, at 23 °C. The average annual rainfall is 2845 mm. The wettest month is January, with an average of 527 mm rainfall, and the driest is September, with 35 mm rainfall.

Serang River

Climate chart (precipitation, max. and min. temperature)
J	F	M	A	M	J	J	A	S	O	N	D
527 26 20	428 25 23	337 26 23	293 27 23	158 26 22	151 27 23	93 28 21	39 30 23	35 32 22	158 32 23	248 28 22	378 25 21
- █ Average max. and min. temperatures in °C
- █ Precipitation totals in mm
Imperial conversion
J	F	M	A	M	J	J	A	S	O	N	D
21 79 68	17 77 73	13 79 73	12 81 73	6.2 79 72	5.9 81 73	3.7 82 70	1.5 86 73	1.4 90 72	6.2 90 73	9.8 82 72	15 77 70
- █ Average max. and min. temperatures in °F
- █ Precipitation totals in inches

== See also ==
- Kedung Ombo Dam
- List of drainage basins of Indonesia
- List of rivers of Indonesia
- List of rivers of Java
