= Cikapundung River =

River in Indonesia

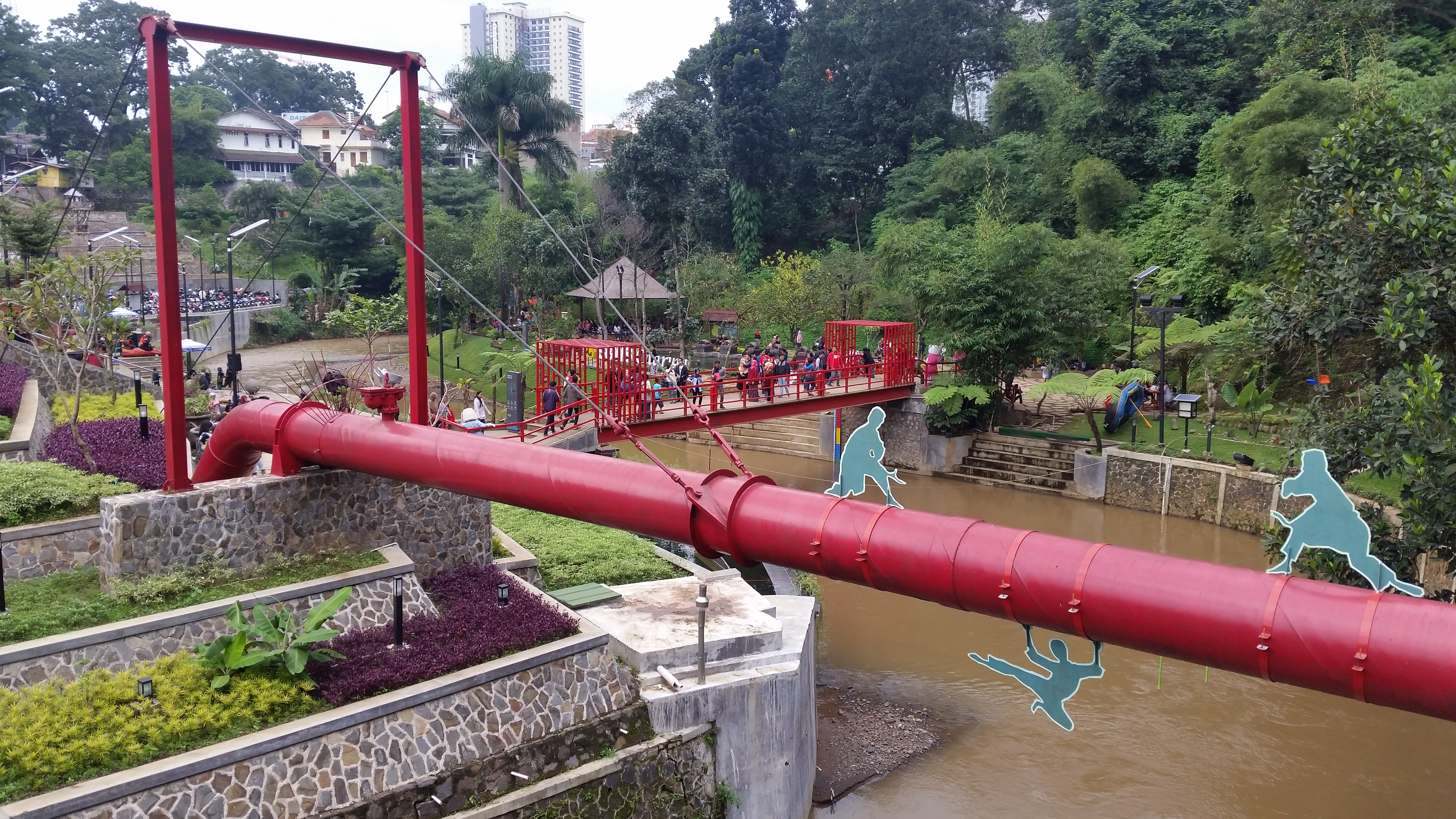
- The Cikapundung River at Taman Teras Cikapundung, Bandung

Location
- Country: Indonesia
- City: Bandung

Physical characteristics
- Mouth
  - location: Confluence with the Citarum River
  - coordinates: 6.98374°S 107.62983°E
- Length: 28 km (17 mi)

Basin features
- River system: Citarum

The Cikapundung River divides the city of Bandung, in West Java, Indonesia. The river flows from its headwaters in Lembang on the northern edge of the city, to the south, where it empties into the Citarum River.

The name Cikapundung is derived from the Sundanese language, and means river (ci, cai: water) and the name of a type of fruit: kapundung or kepundung (Baccaurea racemosa).

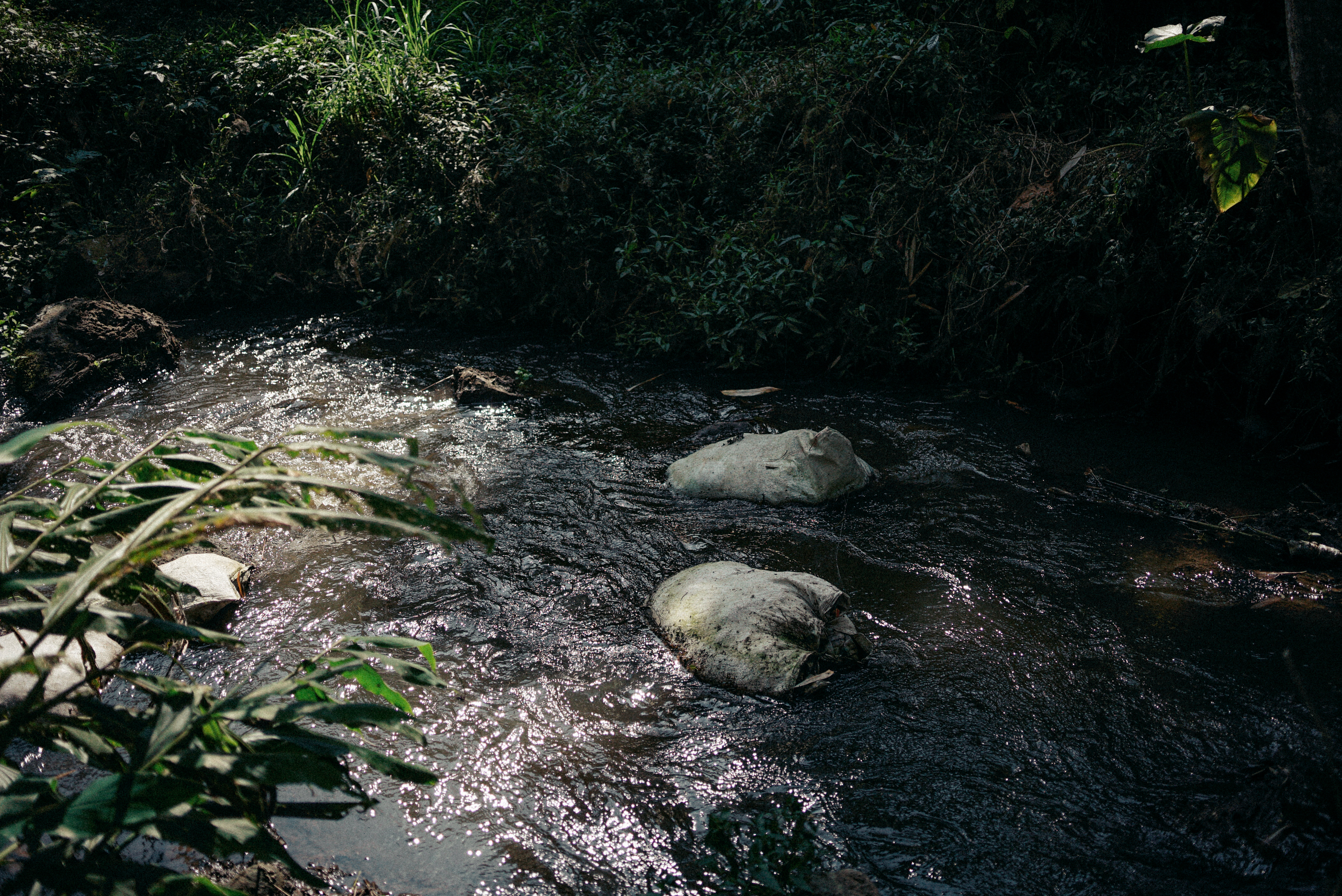
Pollution : wild littering in Cikapundung River, along Batu Lonceng village

Despite being one of the main sources of Bandung's water supply, the river is classified as heavily polluted. Domestic waste, including human waste and detergents, is the main source of pollution as more people are living along the river banks. Other sources of pollutants are industry agriculture and farming.

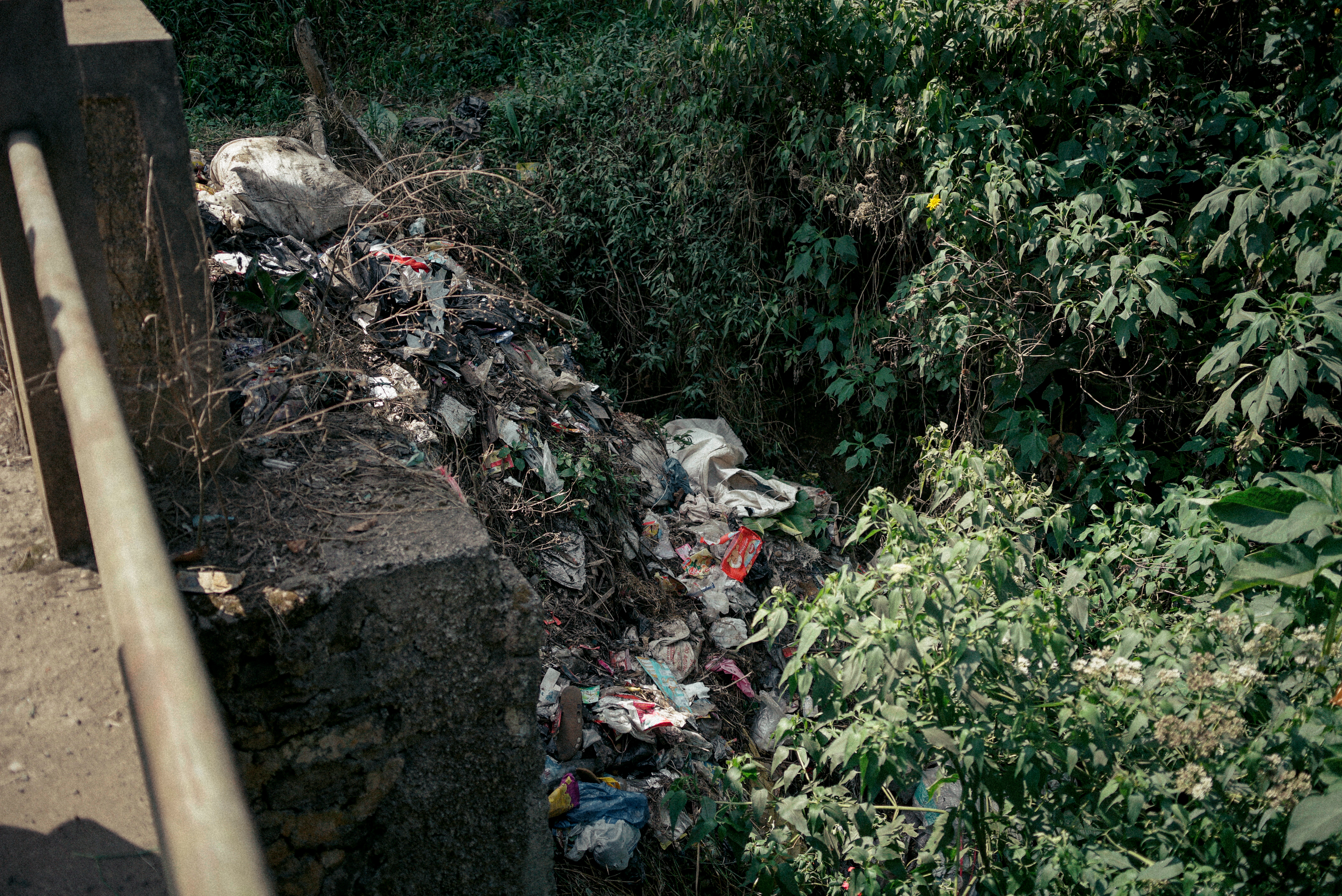
Pollution : wild littering in Cikapundung River, along Batu Lonceng village

== See also ==
- List of drainage basins of Indonesia
- List of rivers of Indonesia
