= Code River =

Codé River Kali Tjode, Sungai Code, Sungai Boyong
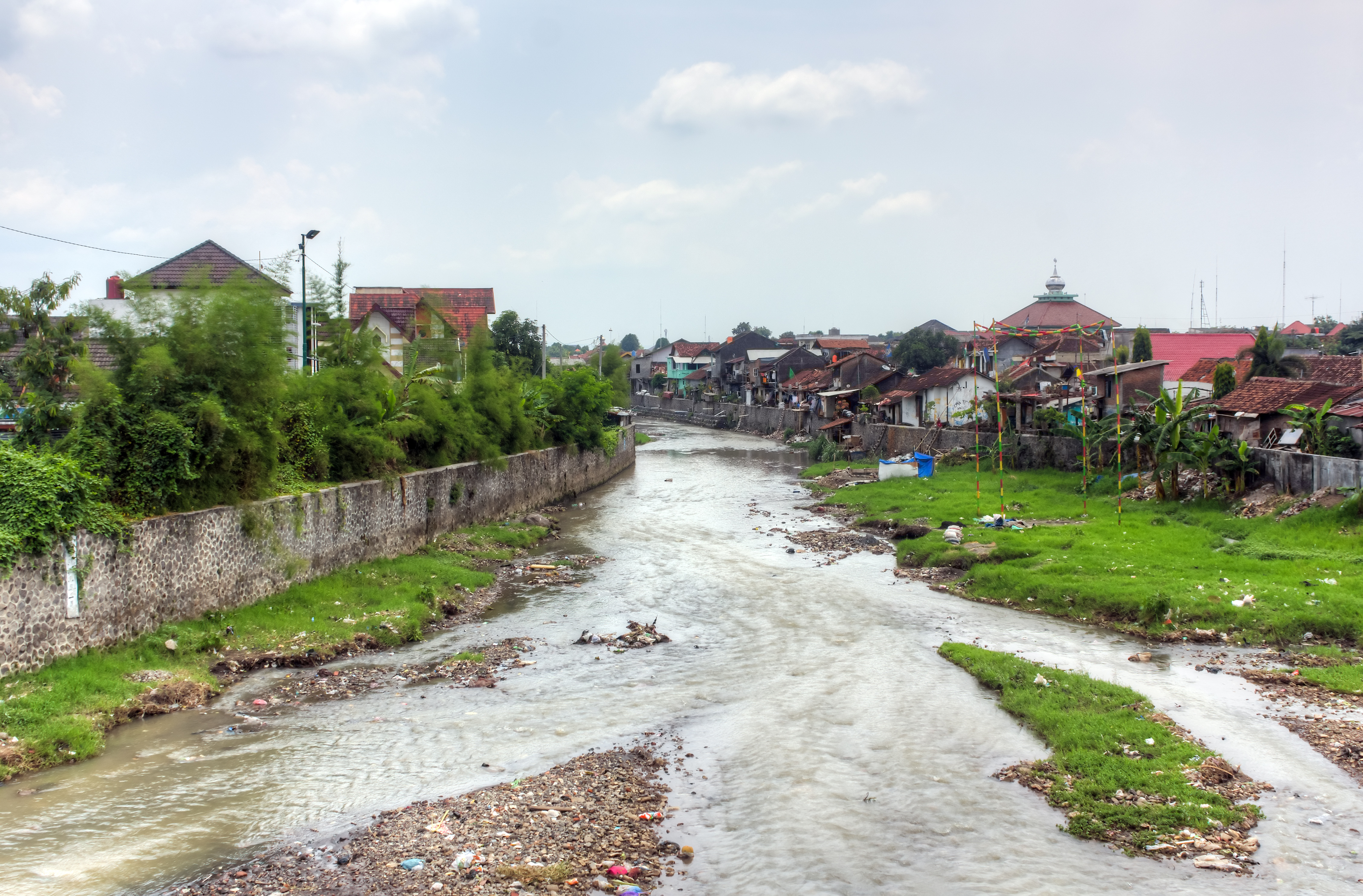
- Native name: ꦏꦭꦶꦕꦺꦴꦝꦼ (Javanese); Kali Codhé (Javanese)

Location
- Country: Indonesia
- Province: Yogyakarta

Physical characteristics
- Source: Mount Merapi
- Mouth: Opak River
  - location: Giwangan, Umbulharjo, Yogyakarta
  - elevation: 67 m (220 ft)

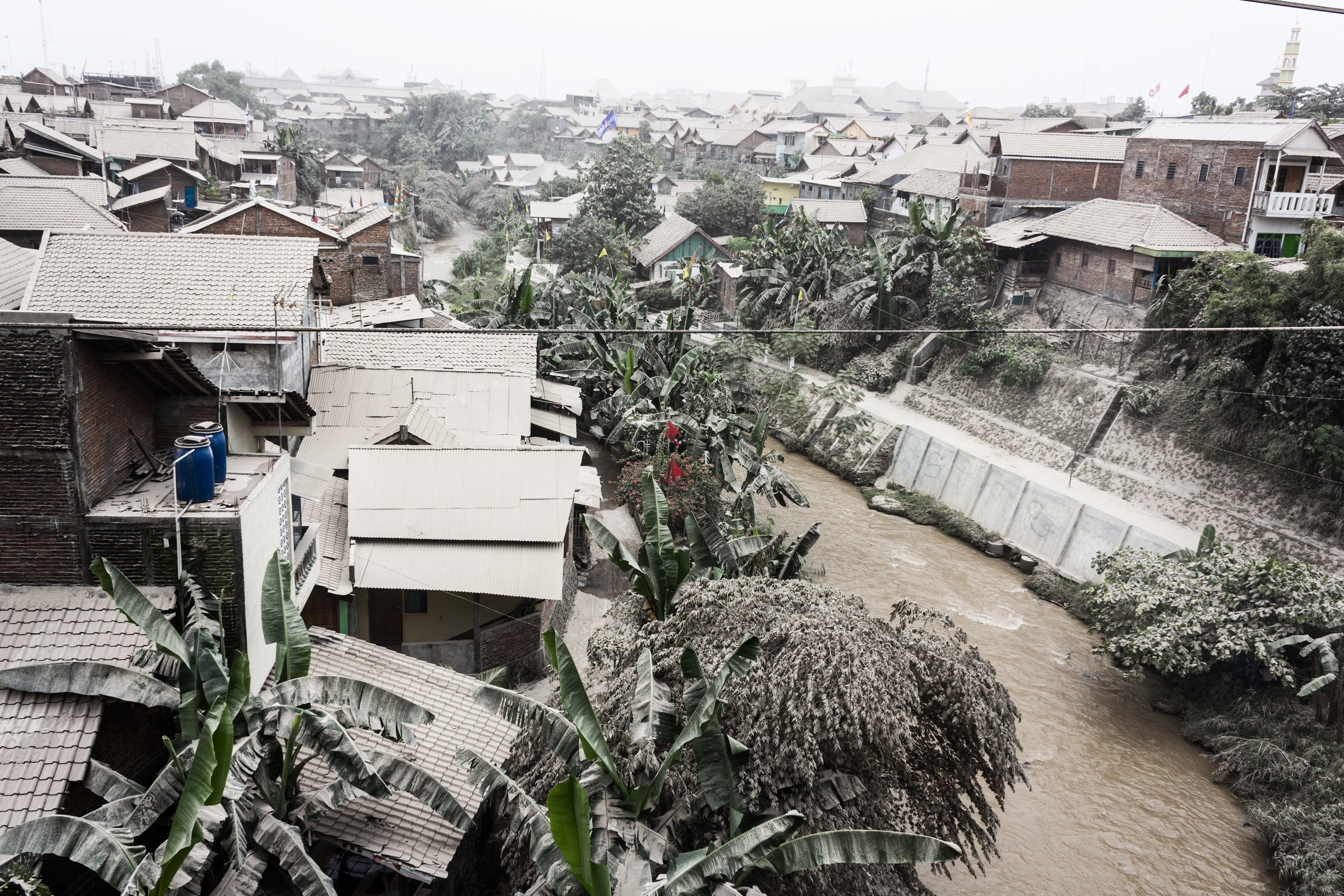
Kali Code and nearby homes in Yogyakarta during the 2014 eruption of Kelud in East Java.

Code (Indonesian pronunciation: [tʃode]; Indonesian: Kali Code) is the name of a river that flows through the city of Yogyakarta on the island of Java, Indonesia. Pollution is a problem along the river. Sayidan Bridge crosses the river.

== Geography ==
The river flows in the southern central area of Java with predominantly tropical savanna climate (designated as As in the Köppen-Geiger climate classification). The annual average temperature in the area is 24 °C. The warmest month is September, when the average temperature is around 27 °C, and the coldest is April, at 20 °C. The average annual rainfall is 2802 mm. The wettest month is January, with an average of 538 mm rainfall, and the driest is September, with 8 mm rainfall.

== Settlements ==
Settlements by people have been created beside the river over time. Also loss of housing close to the river has occurred during severe eruptions from Mount Merapi.

== See also ==
- List of drainage basins of Indonesia
