= Pesanggrahan River =

River in Indonesia

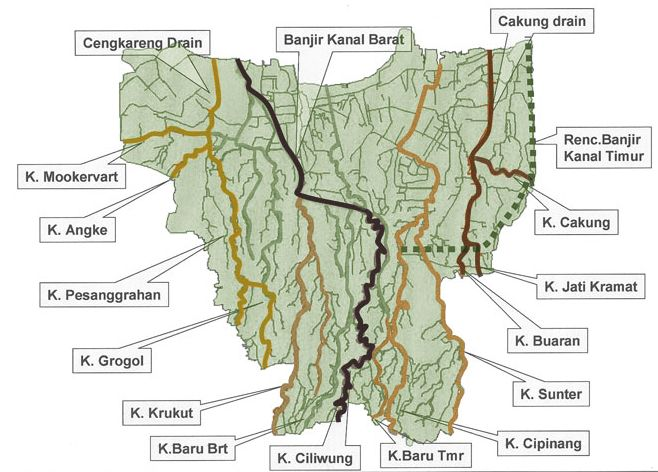
- Pesanggrahan River ("K. Pesanggrahan"), middle left in the map of rivers and canals of Jakarta (2012)

- Location of the mouth Pesanggrahan River (Indonesia)
- Native name: Kali Pesanggrahan (Indonesian); Sungai Pesanggrahan (Indonesian)

Location
- Country: Indonesia
- State: Jakarta, West Java, Banten

Physical characteristics
- Source
  - location: Bogor Regency
- Mouth: Sungai Baung
  - coordinates: 6°10′25″S 106°45′00″E

The Pesanggrahan River (Indonesian: Sungai Pesanggrahan or Kali Pesanggrahan) is a river with the upstream in the Bogor Regency, flowing through the cities of Depok, Jakarta and Tangerang, Banten. The river passes the districts of Tanah Sereal, Bojong Gede, Sawangan, Limo, Kebayoran Lama, Pesanggrahan, Kembangan, and Kebun Jeruk before flowing into the Cengkareng Drain. Based on 2005 data, 55 percent of the watershed area of the Pesanggrahan River is occupied by housing, only 7 percent is still forests, 20 percent rice fields, and 13 percent other agriculture fields.

== Geography ==
The river flows in the northwest area of Java with predominantly tropical rainforest climate (designated as Af in the Köppen-Geiger climate classification). The annual average temperature in the area is 29 °C. The warmest month is October, when the average temperature is around 30 °C, and the coldest is January, at 28 °C. The average annual rainfall is 3674 mm. The wettest month is December, with an average of 456 mm rainfall, and the driest is September, with 87 mm rainfall.

== Flooding ==
The river causes regular flooding on both banks. In August to October 2010 the river walls were broken three times due to high debit and old wall age. The decreasing capacity and low maintenance caused the flooding in November 2012, affecting two areas in Ulujami. On 10 August 2017 the river overflowed and flooded four areas in Pondok Pinang.

== Water quality ==
The joint research by HSBC, Green Radio, Sanggabuana, and Transformasi Hijau during June 2011 discovered that the water of the Pesanggrahan River was 100 percent polluted, so it could not be used for fish farming. The water condition was dirty with an oxygen level of 3.2 ppm, compared with the normal level of 6 ppm. Only two river biota were found, namely snails and worms. Moreovoer, heavy metal pollutants were also detected, including lead, mercury, and hexavalent chromium. Therefore, the river could not be categorized as a category C source water anymore. The decrease in water quality was thought to be the results of higher density of housing on the river banks.

== Normalisation projects ==
In December 2010 river normalisation was planned to increase the debit from 50 cubic meters to 115 cubic meters, but was delayed multiple times due to a long contractor selection process. The project was continued through the Jakarta Emergency Dredging Initiative (JEDI) of the government of Jakarta with the ministry of general work at the end of 2013 until 2014, with the support of the building project to straighten the flow of Pesanggrahan river around ITC Cipulir, and the building of dams in South Jakarta to hold the water at upriver, as to lessen the burdens of the downstream rivers in Jakarta.

The dam building was halted as the inhabitants requested more reimbursements, but could be resolved by the direct negotiation with Joko Widodo, the governor of Jakarta at that time.

== See also ==
- List of drainage basins of Indonesia
- List of rivers of Java
