= Cihara River =

River in Banten, Indonesia

Cihara
- Source (S) and mouth (M) location of Cihara

Location
- Country: Indonesia
- Province: Banten
- Regency: Lebak

Physical characteristics
- Source: Mount Halimun Salak National Park
  - location: West Citorek (Lebak Regency)
  - coordinates: 6.6892348°S 106.2859068°E
  - elevation: 950 m (3,120 ft)
- Mouth: Indian Ocean
  - location: District of Cihara, Lebak
  - coordinates: 6.87882°S 106.10269°E
- Basin size: 208 km^{2} (80 sq mi)

Basin features
- River system: Cihara basin (DAS210733)
- Waterfalls: Curug Halimun (876Q+35G)
- Bridges: Muara Cihara (National Route)
- KML file: DAS Cihara

The Cihara (often written as Ci Hara) is a river located in the Lebak Regency of Banten, Java, Indonesia.

The headwaters are situated southwest of Mount Halimun Salak National Park, around the West Citorek. Flowing for a distance of 29.6 km from the northeast to the southwest towards the southern coast of Banten until it meets the Indian Ocean, approximately in the District of Cihara. The upstream of Cihara at an elevation of around 860 meters above sea level, there is an archaeological site located in Dusun Cibedug, West Citorek. The Lebak Cibedug site covers an area of approximately 40 km^{2} (15 sq mi). In this prehistoric site, numerous Megalithic-era structures are found, including terraced mounds, menhirs, and stone tables like dolmens. Meanwhile, at the river mouth location, there is an expanse of various types of pebble-sized to cobble-sized rocks, ranging from igneous rocks, sedimentary rocks, metamorphic rocks, and quartz vein rocks containing metallic minerals, even coal and fossilized wood fragments. These rock fragments are believed to have been carried to the coast by the flow of the Cihara River, then stirred by extreme waves from the southern sea (Indian Ocean) for thousands or even millions of years, resulting in rounded shapes with smooth to very smooth surfaces. Various types of rocks originate from along the Ci Hara River, from the upstream area to around the river mouth.

== Hydrology ==
The Cihara River is the mainstream in the Cihara River system, covering an area of approximately 208 km^{2} (80 sq mi). Located within the administrative region of Lebak Regency. The Cihara basin is part of the Southern Java Coastal Drainage basins, where its main stem flows and empties into the southern coast of Java island with a relatively short and cascading course. The majority of the topography in the Cihara basin is mountainous, extending from the upstream to the downstream.

The Cihara basin is bordered by the Cimadur basin to the east in its upper part, and the Cisiih basin extending to its downstream part. To the west, it borders the Ciliman and Cilangkahan basins in the central part, followed by the Cipager basin to its downstream part. Meanwhile, in the northern (upstream) part, the Cihara basin borders the Ciujung basin, which is part of the Northern Java Coastal Drainage Basins.

The drainage divide of the Ciliman, Ciujung, and Cihara basins meet at a point on the peak or ridge of a hill on the border of the Cirinten and Cigemblong regions, while their main stems each flow into three different water bodies. The Ciliman basin, with its main stem of Ci Liman, flows into the Sunda Strait. The Ciujung basin, with its main stem of Ci Ujung, flows into the Java Sea. Meanwhile, the Cihara basin, with its main stem of Cihara, flows into the Indian Ocean.

== See also ==
- Baduy people
- Ciletuh-Palabuhanratu Geopark
- Drainage divide
- List of drainage basins of Indonesia
- Triple divide
- Ujung Kulon National Park
