= List of rivers of Indonesia =

This is a list of rivers in Indonesia.

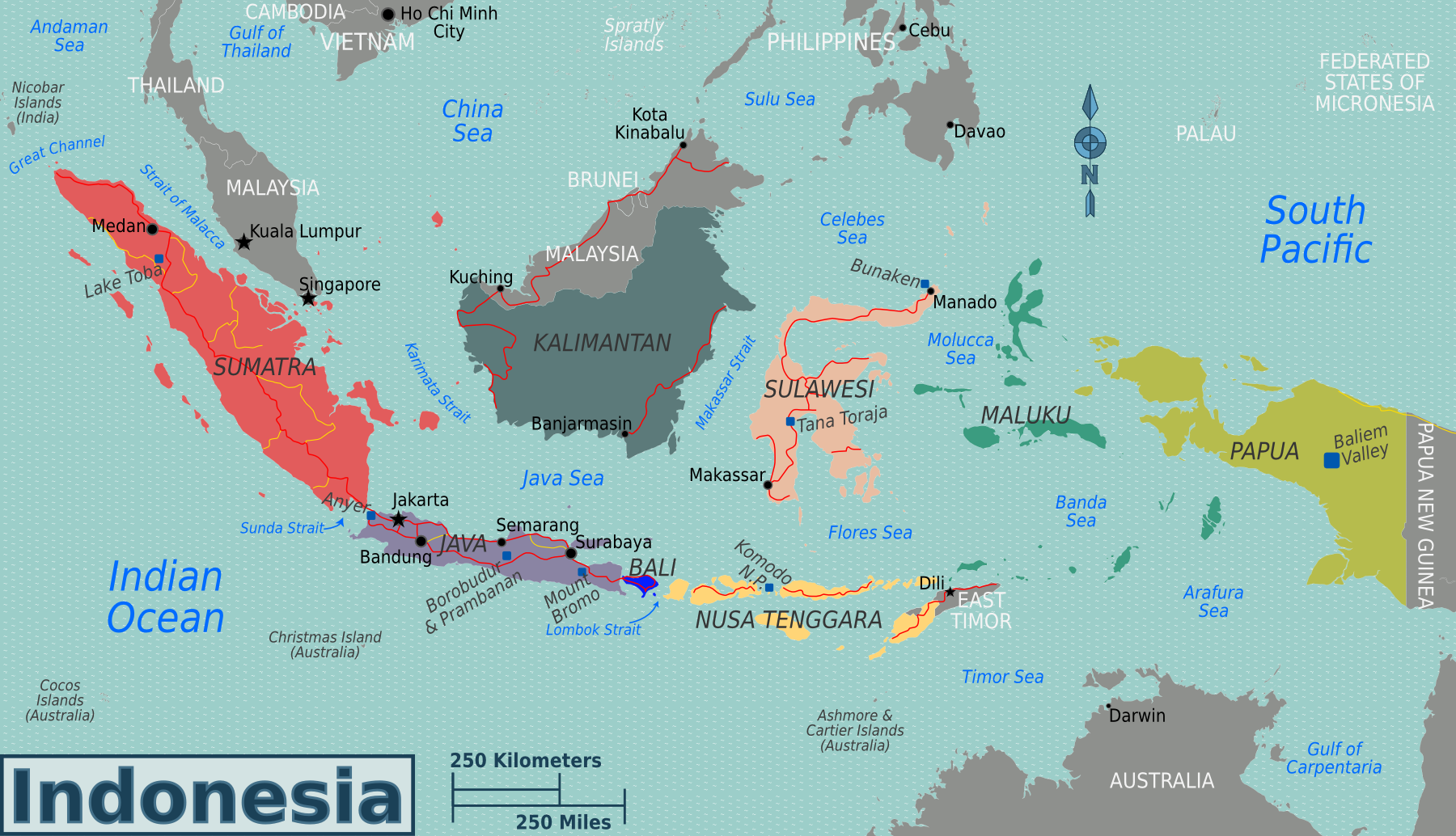

== By island ==
This list is arranged by island in alphabetical order, with respective tributaries indented under each larger stream's name.

=== Ambon ===
- Sikula

=== Bali ===
- Ayung River
- Sungi River
- Telaga Waja River

=== Buru ===
- Waeapo

The largest primary rivers on the island of Buru

River	Mouth coordinates	Basin size (km²)	Average discharge		Length (km)
River	Mouth coordinates	Basin size (km²)	(m^{3}/s)	(km^{3})	Length (km)
Ceram Sea
Wae Nibe	3°3′49.356″S 126°36′0.8784″E	438.5	14.14	0.446	
Wae Bebek	3°4′51.8376″S 126°24′18.6984″E	368.2	18.18	0.573	
Banda Sea
Wae Apo	3°19′36.7284″S 127°4′19.1208″E	1,891.4	65.34	2.06	80
Wae Mala	3°42′10.7892″S 126°21′8.6652″E	804.7	47.76	1.506	
Wae Dalan	3°35′48.3324″S 126°10′15.6612″E	529	29.86	0.942	
Wae Pede	3°51′25.2072″S 126°40′47.8524″E	451.3	24.63	0.777	
Other		4,121.9	120.27	3.793	
Buru		8,605	320.18	10.097	

=== Flores ===
- Sissa River
- Wera River

=== Java ===
- Angke River
- Asem River
- Baliung River
- Baru Barat River
- Baru Timur River
- Bodri River
- Brantas River
  - Mas River
  - Porong River
- Buaran River
- Buni River
- Cakung
- Ci Banten
- Ci Durian
- Ci Kaengan
- Ci Kapundung
- Ci Liwung
- Ci Manceuri
- Ci Manuk
- Ci Pinang
- Ci Sadane
- Ci Tanduy
- Ci Tarum
  - Beet River
- Ci Ujung
- Comal River
- Grogol River
- Jatikramat River
- Kaso River (Sukabumi)
- Kaso River (Garut)
- Krukut River
- Laki River
- Liman River
- Lusi River
- Madiun River
- Mandiri River
- Mookervaart River
- Opak River
- Oyo River
- Pemali River
- Pesanggrahan River
- Progo River
- Sanen River
- Serang River
- Serayu River
- Setail River
- Solo River
- Sunter River
- Tuntang River
- Widas River

=== Kalimantan ===
Below are the rivers in the Indonesian territory of Borneo (Kalimantan)

- Barito River
  - Alalak River
  - Martapura River
  - Kapuas River
  - Negara River
    - Tabalong River
- Berau River
  - Kelai River
- Jelai-Bila River
- Kahayan River
- Kapuas River
  - Sekayam River
  - Melawi River
- Kayan River
  - Bahau River
- Kumai River
  - Sekonyer River
- Lamandau River
  - Arut River
- Mahakam River
  - Belayan River
  - Kaso River
  - Lawa River
  - Telen River
- Mendawai River
- Pawan River
  - Keriau River
- Pembuang River
- Sambas River
- Sampit River
- Sembakung River
- Sesayap River
- Tunan River

=== Lombok ===
- Babak
- Dodokan
- Jangkok

=== Papua ===
- Apauwar River
- Baliem (Vriendschaps) River
- Becking River
- Bewani River
- Bian River
- Brazza River
- Bulaka River
- Digul
- Fly River
- Grime River
- Kampung River
- Kamundan River
- Kumbe River
- Lorentz (Undir) River
- Mamberamo
- Mandobo River
- Mapi River
- Maro (Merauke) River
- Mimika River
- Momats River
- Muturi River
- Nawa River
- Ok Tedi River
- Pauwasi River
- Pulau (Eilanden) River
- Seremuk River
- Tabai River
- Tami River
- Tariku River
- Taritatu River
- Tor River
- Sobger River
- Songgato River
- Sepik
- Van Daalen River
- Wamma River
- Wapoga River
- Warenai River
- Waruta River
- Wildeman River
- Wiriagar River
- Wiru River
- Wowei River

=== Seram ===
- Eti
- Kawa
- Masiwang
- Sapalewa
- Salawai
- Tala

=== Sulawesi ===
- Bongka River
- Jeneberang River
- Kalaena River
- Karama River
- Laa River
- Lariang River
- Lasolo River
  - Lalindu River
- Manado River
- Marisa River
- Paguyaman River
- Palu River
- Pangkajene River
- Poso River
- Sadang River
  - Mamasa River
- Sampara River
- Walanae River

=== Sumatra ===
- Aceh
- Asahan
- Banyuasin
- Barumun
- Batang Hari
- Bila
- Bohorok
- Gadis
- Indragiri
- Jamboaye
- Kampar Kanan
- Kampar
- Kluet
- Komering
- Kualu
- Kumu
- Mandau
- Merangin
- Mesuji
- Musi
- Ogan
- Ombilin
- Peureulak
- Peusangen
- Rawas
- Renun
- Rokan
- Rokan-kanan
- Rokan-kiri
- Sekampung
- Seputih
- Siak
- Silau
- Simpang-kanan
- Simpang-kiri
- Sinamar
- Tamiang
- Tembesi
- Teunom
- Toru
- Tripa
- Tulangbawang
- Tungkal
- Wampu
- Woyla

=== Sumba ===
- Kadassa River
- Kadumbul River
- Kambaniru River
- Melolo River
- Polapare River
- Wanokaka River

=== Sumbawa ===
- Brang Biji River
- Moyo River

The largest primary rivers on the island of Sumbawa:

River	Mouth coordinates	Basin size (km²)	Average discharge^{*}		Length (km)
River	Mouth coordinates	Basin size (km²)	(m^{3}/s)	(km^{3})	Length (km)
Flores Sea
Moyo (Boak)	8°24′53.8236″S 117°28′45.9264″E	785.045	14.314	0.45	80.62
Timor Sea
Beh	9°1′10.0416″S 117°11′50.9604″E	1,531.165	31.828	1.005	81.34
Rea	8°45′14.76″S 116°47′5.0352″E	834.425	22.137	0.7	66.25
Other		11,905.935	229.264	7.235	
Sumbawa		15,056.57	297.543	9.39	

^{*}Period: 1994–2015

=== West Timor ===
- Benanain River
- Mina River
- Noel Besi River
- Pono River

== By province ==
This clickable map shows province of Indonesia as of 25 October 2012. Click on a province name to go to its list of rivers.

== Runoff by region ==
Region	Area		Runoff	
Region	km^{2}	%	km^{3}	%
Bali and Tenggara	72,890.97	3.8	60	1.9
Java	125,124.786	6.6	187	5.9
Kalimantan	536,799.26	28.2	1,008	31.2
Papua and Maluku	499,240.754	26.2	981	30.5
Sulawesi	188,437.99	9.9	247	7.6
Sumatra	482,075.24	25.3	738	22.9
Indonesia	1,904,569	100.0	3,221	100.0

== Major rivers of Indonesia ==
River	Island	Length (km)	Drainage area (km²)	Average discharge (m^{3}/s)	Outflow
Kapuas	Borneo	1,143	94,456.9	6,260.1	South China Sea
Sepik^{*}	New Guinea	1,126	80,386.2	5,000	Bismarck Sea
Mamberamo	New Guinea	1,112	78,956.9	5,173.5	Pacific Ocean
Barito	Borneo	1,090	78,631.7	4,514	Java Sea
Fly^{*}	New Guinea	1,060	73,809.3	6,500	Gulf of Papua
Mahakam	Borneo	980	77,095.5	4,278	Macassar Strait
Digul	New Guinea	853	42,142.6	3,332.7	Arafura Sea
Batang Hari	Sumatra	800	46,504	2,819	South China Sea
Musi	Sumatra	759	59,942	3,211.2	South China Sea
Kahayan	Borneo	658	16,062.7	1,046.3	Java Sea
Mendawai	Borneo	616	19,559	1,135.3	Java Sea
Bengawan Solo	Java	600	15,296	693	Java Sea
Bian	New Guinea	580.6	8,044.3	392	Arafura Sea
Kampar	Sumatra	580	24,548	1,351.2	South China Sea
Kayan	Borneo	576	33,171.8	2,463.4	Celebes Sea
Eilanden	New Guinea	569.4	37,164	3,133	Arafura Sea
Indragiri	Sumatra	500	22,758	1,339	South China Sea
Barumun	Sumatra	440	13,414	824.5	Malacca Strait
Maro	New Guinea	383	6,220	262.4	Arafura Sea
Momats	New Guinea	380	6,767.2	491.6	Arafura Sea
Siak	Sumatra	370	11,214	684	Malacca Strait
Sembakung	Borneo	352	9,350	563.4	Celebes Sea
Rokan	Sumatra	350	20,189	1,506	Malacca Strait
Seruyan	Borneo	350	13,329	825.6	Java Sea
Sampara	Sulawesi	341	6,978.4	222.03	Banda Sea
Kamundan	New Guinea	340.6	5,640.4	386.6	Ceram Sea
Brantas	Java	320	11,973	612	Bali Sea
Singkil	Sumatra	316	10,090	642	Indian Ocean
Derewo	New Guinea	304.3	4,334.2	317.2	Pacific Ocean
Kumbe	New Guinea	300.4	3 765.9	131	Arafura Sea
Berau	Borneo	300	16,993	902.8	Celebes Sea
Kotawaringin	Borneo	300	13,896	892.5	Java Sea
Sesayap	Borneo	279	18,158	1,275.4	Celebes Sea
Lasolo	Sulawesi	277	6,002	213.9	Banda Sea
Lorentz	New Guinea	276.8	3,962.3	380	Arafura Sea
Sampit	Borneo	270	14,745	866.6	Java Sea
Citarum	Java	269	6,614	423	Java Sea
Walanae	Sulawesi	250	7,380	275.1	Banda Sea
Seputih	Sumatra	249	7,072	300	Java Sea
Lariang	Sulawesi	245	7,069	299.3	Macassar Strait
Wiriagar	New Guinea	238.3	3,763.6	239.2	Ceram Sea
Apauwar	New Guinea	233.3	3,043.9	257.6	Pacific Ocean
Sambas	Borneo	233	7,964.9	537.8	South China Sea
Banyuasin	Sumatra	220	13,302	763	South China Sea
Mesuji	Sumatra	220	6,529	311	Java Sea
Wapoga	New Guinea	214.2	5,096	429.6	Pacific Ocean
Pawan	Borneo	197	11,508	973.2	South China Sea
Serayu	Java	181	4,375	441.19	Indian Ocean
Citanduy	Java	178	3,704	325	Indian Ocean
Cimanuk	Java	170	3,646	249.9	Java Sea
Sebangau	Borneo	167	4,303.4	193.3	Java Sea
Omba	New Guinea	157.3	5,360	381.2	Banda Sea
Siriwo	New Guinea	150.9	4,013	330.8	Pacific Ocean
Sebyar	New Guinea	150	6,272.1	348	Ceram Sea
Sadang	Sulawesi	150	6,466.3	265.3	Macassar Strait
Karama	Sulawesi	150	5,530.9	280.9	Macassar Strait
Uta	New Guinea	147.3	4,170.3	328.4	Arafura Sea
Asahan	Sumatra	147	7,225.5	291.2	Malacca Strait
Tulang Bwang	Sumatra	136	9,711	476.8	Java Sea
Jelai	Borneo	135	6,477.7	393.4	South China Sea
Karabra	New Guinea	132.6	3,986	290	Ceram Sea
Benain	Timor	132	3,158	46.5	Timor Sea
Bongka	Sulawesi	122	3,085	132.8	Molucca Sea
Larona	Sulawesi	120	4,600	264.9	Banda Sea
Poso	Sulawesi	100	2,673.4	119.9	Molucca Sea
Laa	Sulawesi	96.3	2,875.6	166.5	Banda Sea
Palu	Sulawesi	90	2,694	103.5	Macassar Strait
Muturi	New Guinea	87.2	3,660.1	287.3	Ceram Sea
Sissa	Flores	87	1,230	55.5	Flores Sea
Kaloena	Sulawesi	85	1,476.5	104	Banda Sea
Waeapo	Buru	80	1,891.4	65.3	Banda Sea
Ayung	Bali	68.5	300.84	11	Bali Sea

^{*}Total basin.

=== Rainfall, runoff ===
River	Rainfall (mm)	Runoff (mm)	(%)	River	Rainfall (mm)	Runoff (mm)	(%)
Apauwar				Mahakam	3,163	1,911	60.4
Asahan	2,950	1,271	43.1	Mamberamo	3,578	2,406	67.2
Ayung	2,587	1,153	44.6	Maro	2,002	804	40.2
Banyuasin	2,579	1,809	70.1	Mentaya	2,991	1,854	62
Barito	3,000	1,810	60.4	Mesuji	3,248	1,502	46.3
Barumun	2,801	1,938	69.1	Momats	4,466	2,475	55.4
Batang Hari	3,183	1,912	60.1	Musi	2,800	1,689	60.3
Bengawan Solo	2,100	1,429	68	Muturi	3,835	2,475	64.6
Benain	1,760	464	26.4	Omba			
Berau	2,900	1,676	57.8	Palu	2,092	1,211	57.9
Bian	2,317	1,236	53.3	Pawan	3,702	2,667	72
Bongka	2,929	1,358	46.4	Poso	2,715	1,414	52.1
Brantas	2,952	1,612	54.1	Rokan	3,766	2,352	62.5
Cimanuk	2,465	1,722	69.9	Sadang	2,500	1,294	51.8
Citanduy	3,547	2,767	78	Sambas	3,542	2,129	60.1
Citarum	2,646	2,017	76.2	Sampara	2,926	1,003	34.3
Derewo	4,168	2,308	55.4	Sebangau			
Digul	3,732	2,494	66.8	Sebyar	3,744	1,750	46.7
Eilanden	3,970	2,659	67	Sembakung	4,020	1,900	47.3
Fly	4,588	2,704	60.5	Sepik	3,390	2,116	62.4
Indragiri	2,757	1,856	67.3	Seputih	3,176	1,338	42.1
Jelai	2,760	1,915	69.4	Serayu	3,897	3,180	81.6
Kahayan	3,400	2,054	60.4	Seruyan	3,118	1,953	62.7
Kaloena	4,176	2,221	53.2	Sesayap	4,020	2,215	55.1
Kampar	2,667	1,757	65.9	Siak	2,673	1,924	72
Kamundan	3,744	2,162	57.7	Singkil			
Karabra				Siriwo	3,967	2,600	65.5
Karama	2,863	1,601	55.9	Sissa	1,686	1,423	84.4
Katingan	2,991	1,831	61.2	Tulangbawang	3,248	1,548	47.7
Kayan	3,957	2,437	61.6	Uta			
Kotawaringin	2,778	2,026	72.9	Waeapo			
Kumbe	1,951	932	47.8	Walanae	2,550	1,160	45.5
Laa				Wapoga	3,534	2,659	75.2
Lariang	2,500	1,335	53.4	Wiriagar	3,744	2,004	53.5
Larona				Kapuas	3,666	2,339	63.8
Lasolo	2,495	1,138	45.6				
Lorentz	4,238	2,875	67.8	Indonesia	2,702	1,691	62.6

=== Discharge ===
River	Average discharge (m^{3}/s)		
River	Normal dry year	Normal wet year	Multi-annual
Kapuas	5,600	7,803	6,260.1
Mamberamo	4,110	6,358	5,173.5
Fly	3,870	8,000	6,500
Sepik	3,700	7,000	5,000
Barito	3,700	5,497	4,514
Mahakam	3,000	5,953	4,278
Digul	2,760	3,867	3,332.7
Musi	2,482	3,961	3,211.2
Eilanden	2,084	3,783	3,133
Batang Hari	1,485		2,819
Kayan	1,254		2,463.4
Kampar	1,054	2,063	1,351.2
Katingan	734	1,414	1,135.3
Kahayan	706	1,178.4	1,046.3
Indragiri	591		1,339
Mentaya	514	1,064.4	866.6
Bengawan Solo	463	962	693
Brantas	446		612
Berau	394		902.8
Seruyan		1,216	825.6
Pawan		1,215	973.2

== See also ==
- Drainage basins of Indonesia
- List of drainage basins of Indonesia
- Geography of Indonesia
- List of rivers of Papua New Guinea

== Sources ==
- Rand McNally, The New International Atlas, 1993.
- GEOnet Names Server
- Indonesia 1:250,000 Series T503, U.S. Army Map Service, (1954)
