= Kumbe River =

Coordinates: 8°21′S 140°14′E

Kumbe River Sungai Kumbe, Koembe-rivier
- Location of river mouth

Location
- Country: Indonesia

Physical characteristics
- Source
  - location: Highland Papua
- Mouth
  - location: Merauke Regency, Arafura Sea
- Length: 300.42 km (186.67 mi)
- Basin size: 3,765.9 km^{2} (1,454.0 mi^{2})
- Width
  - minimum: 97 m (318 ft)
  - maximum: 700.1 m (2,297 ft)
- Discharge
  - location: Near mouth
  - average: 121.2 m^{3}/s (4,280 cu ft/s)

The Kumbe is a river of Merauke Regency, South Papua, Indonesia. It has a distinct meandering course, with a total length of 242 km, and a width of around 97–700.1 m. The Bian River and the Maro River are part of the same basin.

== Geography ==
The river flows in the southern area of Papua with a predominantly tropical monsoon climate (designated as Am in the Köppen-Geiger climate classification). The annual average temperature in the area is 23 °C. The warmest month is November when the average temperature is around 26 °C, and the coldest is June, at 21 °C. The average annual rainfall is 2160 mm. The wettest month is January, with an average of 399 mm rainfall, and the driest is August, with 26 mm rainfall.

== See also ==
- List of drainage basins of Indonesia
- List of rivers of Indonesia
