= Bian River =

Bian River may refer to:

- Bian River (China)
- Bian River (Indonesia)

== See also ==
- Bian (disambiguation)
