= List of rivers of Sumbawa =

List of rivers flowing in the island of Sumbawa, Indonesia.

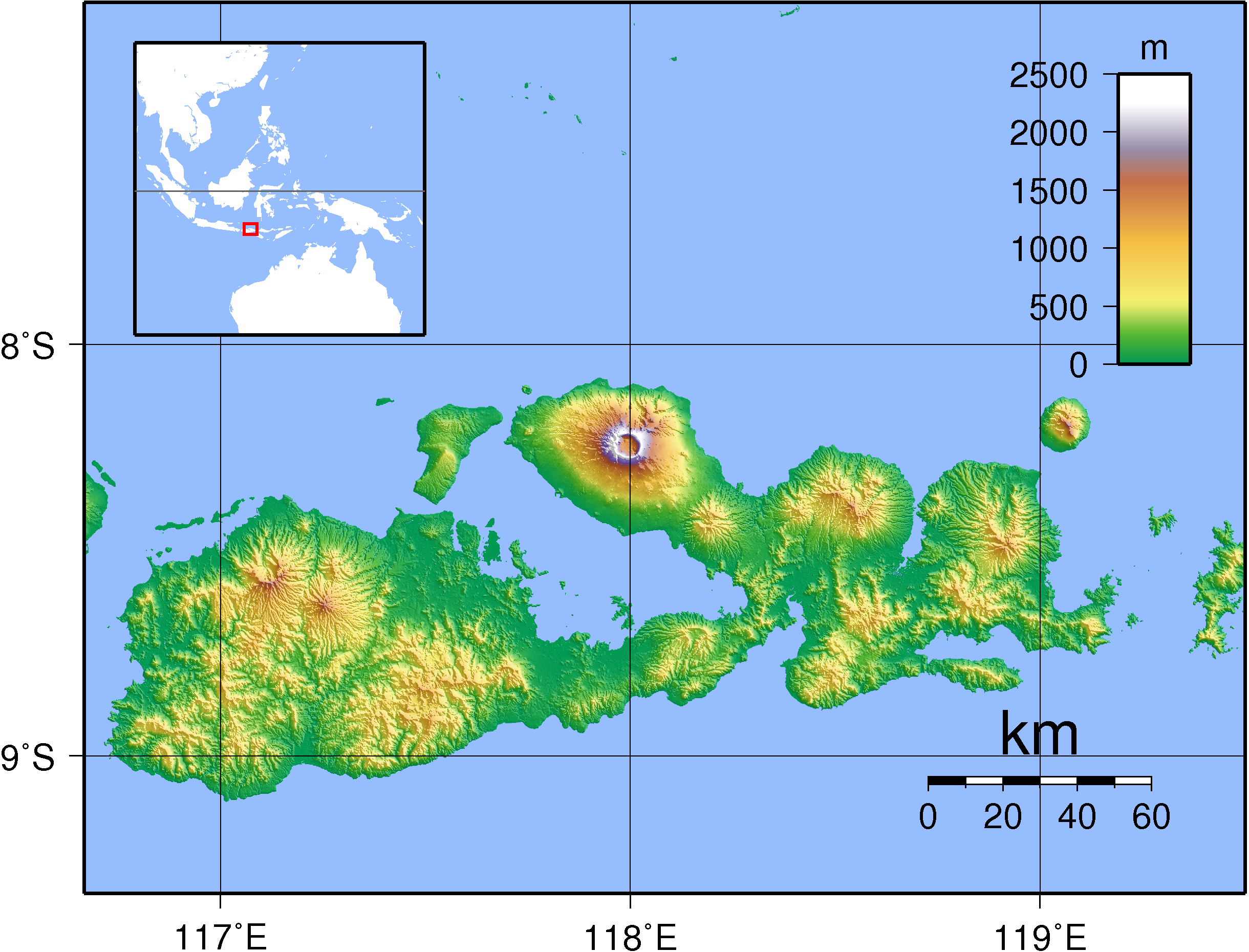
Major rivers in Sumbawa island

== In alphabetical order ==
- Brang Biji River
- Moyo River

== See also ==
- Drainage basins of Sumbawa
- List of drainage basins of Indonesia
- List of rivers of Indonesia
- List of rivers of Lesser Sunda Islands
