= Momats River =

Coordinates: 5.35881°S 137.76699°E

Momats River Sungai Momats, Sungai Armandville, Pater De Cocq D’Armdville, Le Cocq d’Armandville rivier, Pater Le Coq d’Armandville Rivier, Pater Le Cocq d’Armandville Rivier, Pater le Cock d’Armandville-rivier, Momats, Pater le Cocq d Armanville, Sungai Slocgd Armandville
- Location in South Papua Location in Indonesia

Location
- Country: Indonesia

Physical characteristics
- Source
  - location: Highland Papua
- Mouth: Arafura Sea
- Length: 380 km (240 mi)
- Basin size: 4,496 km^{2} (1,736 mi^{2})
- Discharge
  - average: 463.1 m^{3}/s (16,350 cu ft/s)

The Momats River is a river in southern Western Papua (now Papua province), Indonesia.

== Geography ==
The river flows in the southern area of Papua with predominantly tropical rainforest climate (designated as Af in the Köppen-Geiger climate classification). The annual average temperature in the area is 23 °C. The warmest month is December, when the average temperature is around 25 °C, and the coldest is July, at 21 °C. The average annual rainfall is 6240 mm. The wettest month is August, with an average of 690 mm rainfall, and the driest is January, with 402 mm rainfall.

== See also ==
- List of drainage basins of Indonesia
- List of rivers of Indonesia
- List of rivers of Western New Guinea
