= Muturi River =

Coordinates: 2.1579°S 133.7238°E

Muturi River Sungai Muturi, Wai Moetoeri, Wai Muturi, Air Moetoeri, Moetoeri Rivier, Soengai Moetoeri
- Location of river mouth

Location
- Country: Indonesia

Physical characteristics
- Source
  - location: West Papua
- Mouth
  - location: Bintuni Bay
- Length: 87.2 km (54.2 mi)
- Basin size: 3,660.1 km^{2} (1,413.2 mi^{2})
- Discharge
  - location: Near mouth
  - average: 287.34 m^{3}/s (10,147 cu ft/s)

The Muturi River is a river in West Papua province, Indonesia.

== Geography ==
The river flows in the West Papua province with predominantly tropical rainforest climate (designated as Af in the Köppen-Geiger climate classification). The annual average temperature in the area is 21 °C. The warmest month is October, when the average temperature is around 24 °C, and the coldest is January, at 19 °C. The average annual rainfall is 3835 mm. The wettest month is March, with an average of 385 mm rainfall, and the driest is October, with 173 mm rainfall.

== See also ==
- List of drainage basins of Indonesia
- List of rivers of Indonesia
