= Awang =

Awang may refer to:

== Names ==
=== Patronym ===
- Abdul Hadi Awang (born 1947), Malaysian politician
- Azizulhasni Awang (born 1988), Malaysian professional track cyclist
- Hasbullah Awang (1952–2015), Malaysian sports commentator
- Hasbullah Awang (footballer) (born 1983), Malaysian footballer
- Mat Aznan Awang (died 1993), Malaysian Army soldier
- Suffian Awang (born 1971), political secretary for the Prime Minister of Malaysia
- Usman Awang (1929–2001), Malaysian poet, playwright, novelist
- Yahya Awang, Malaysian cardiothoracic surgeon

=== Given name ===
- Awang Adek Hussin (born 1956), former Malaysian Ambassador to the United States
- Awang Alak Betatar or Muhammad Shah (1368–1402), first Sultan of Brunei
- Awang anak Rawang (born 1929), an Iban Scout from Sarawak in Borneo
- Awang Faroek Ishak (born 1948), Governor of East Kalimantan
- Awang Pateh Berbai (died 1425), third Sultan of Brunei
- Awang Hassan (1910–1998), Malaysian politician

== Places ==
- Awang Bay, Lombok, Indonesia
- Awang Kasom, a village in Ukhrul district, Manipur state, India

== Other ==
- Awang (boat), an ornate traditional dugout canoe used by the Maranao people of the Philippines
- Awang (honorific), a Bruneian honorific
- Awang Airport, Maguindanao, Philippines
