= Lorentz River =

River in Indonesia

The Lorentz River Undir, North River
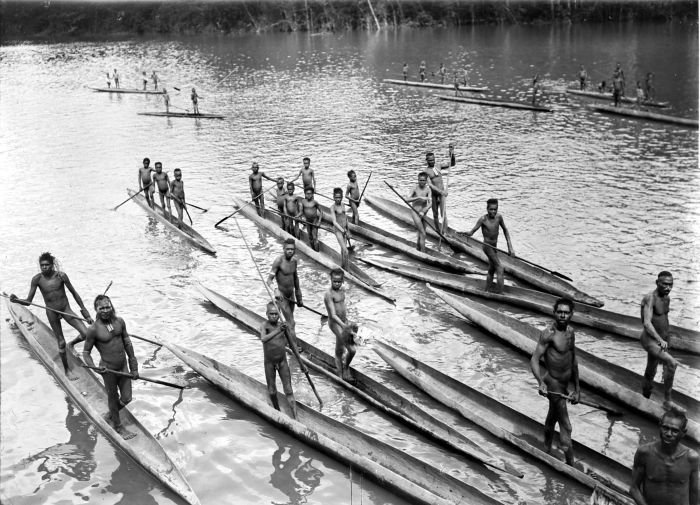
- The Lorenz during the third South New Guinea expedition (1912-13)

- Location in South Papua Location in Indonesia

Location
- Country: Indonesia
- Province: South Papua

Physical characteristics
- Source: Southeast of the Puncak Trikora in the Jayawijaya Mountains
  - location: Highland Papua, Indonesia
  - coordinates: 4°15′S 138°40′E
- Length: 276.84 km (172.02 mi)
- Basin size: 4,169 km^{2} (1,610 mi^{2})
- Discharge
  - location: Arafura Sea (Eilanden Delta)
  - average: 380 m^{3}/s (13,000 cu ft/s)

The Lorentz River (also Unir or Undir in Indonesian, or Noordrivier in Dutch) is located in the Indonesian province of South Papua in Western New Guinea, about 3,500 km northeast of the Indonesian capital Jakarta. It originates in the central east-west mountain range of New Guinea and flows southwards into the Arafura Sea at Flamingo Bay. During the first two Dutch expeditions to Southern New Guinea (1907–10) it was called Northern River. In 1910 it was renamed after the Dutch explorer Hendrikus Albertus Lorentz. After it became part of Indonesia, it was renamed to Unir, as in the language of the local Asmat people, while the Lorentz name is still in use.

== History ==
At the beginning of the 20th century, the navigable part of the river played an important role in the exploration of Dutch New Guinea in western New Guinea. Three large Dutch expeditions led from the mouth upstream to the central snow-capped mountains, which were still unexplored. The expeditions aimed to cover the Wilhelmina summit (now called Puncak Trikora ) covered by "eternal snow". The first of the three South New Guinea expeditions failed before the mountain could be reached. The second expedition reached the snow-capped foot of Wilhelmina, but it was only during the third expedition that the mountain could be conquered on 21 February 1913.

== Geography ==
The river flows in the southwest area of Papua with a predominantly tropical rainforest climate (designated as Af in the Köppen-Geiger climate classification). The annual average temperature in the area is 21 °C. The warmest month is October when the average temperature is around 23 °C, and the coldest is July, at 20 °C. The average annual rainfall is 4,238-5,547 mm. The wettest month is May, with an average of 594 mm rainfall, and the driest is July, with 384 mm rainfall.

== See also ==
- List of drainage basins of Indonesia
- List of rivers of Indonesia
- List of rivers of Western New Guinea
- Southern New Guinea freshwater swamp forests
