= Bian =

Bian or BIAN may refer to:

== Places ==
- Bian River in China
- Bian (汴), the Chinese abbreviation for Kaifeng, Henan Province, China
- Bian, a former district of the Duchy of Lu in ancient China
- Bian River in Indonesia
- Bian, a former name for Uiseong County, North Gyeongsang, South Korea
- Bian, Hamadan, a village in Iran

== People ==
- Bian, a Chinese surname
- Bian, short for rezubian, the Japanese term for lesbians

== Others ==
- Banking Industry Architecture Network e.V. (BIAN), a nonprofit banking organization
- Bian (carriage), a four-wheeled horse-drawn vehicle
- Bian (weapon), a Chinese weapon also known as a "hard whip"
- Bi'an (monster), a Chinese monster considered a tigerlike dragon

== See also ==
- Bian lian in Chinese drama
