= Sampara River =

Coordinates: 3.81667°S 122.46667°E

Sampara River Sungai Sampara, Salo Sampara, Sampara-rivier
- Location of river mouth Sampara River (Indonesia)

Location
- Country: Indonesia

Physical characteristics
- Source
  - location: Southeast Sulawesi
- Length: 341 km (212 mi)
- Basin size: 6,905.9 km^{2} (2,666.4 mi^{2})
- Discharge
  - location: Near mouth
  - average: 157.5 m^{3}/s (5,560 cu ft/s)

Sampara River is a river in the province of Southeast Sulawesi on the Sulawesi island, Indonesia, about 1800 km northeast of the capital Jakarta.

== Geography ==
The river flows in the southeast area of Sulawesi with predominantly tropical monsoon climate (designated as Am in the Köppen-Geiger climate classification). The annual average temperature in the area is 23 °C. The warmest month is September, when the average temperature is around 26 °C, and the coldest is February, at 21 °C. The average annual rainfall is 2926 mm. The wettest month is May, with an average of 461 mm rainfall, and the driest is October, with 27 mm rainfall.

Sampara River

Climate chart (precipitation, max. and min. temperature)
J	F	M	A	M	J	J	A	S	O	N	D
295 23 22	287 23 19	321 25 21	271 24 23	461 23 23	378 24 20	366 24 21	92 24 22	31 27 24	27 28 24	112 28 24	285 25 21
- █ Average max. and min. temperatures in °C
- █ Precipitation totals in mm
Imperial conversion
J	F	M	A	M	J	J	A	S	O	N	D
12 73 72	11 73 66	13 77 70	11 75 73	18 73 73	15 75 68	14 75 70	3.6 75 72	1.2 81 75	1.1 82 75	4.4 82 75	11 77 70
- █ Average max. and min. temperatures in °F
- █ Precipitation totals in inches

== See also ==
- List of drainage basins of Indonesia
- List of rivers of Indonesia
- List of rivers of Sulawesi
