= Serayu River =

Serayu River Kali Serayu, Sungai Serayu, Ci Sarayu, Kali Seraju, Kali Serajoe, Chi Seraju, Serdju, Serajoe River
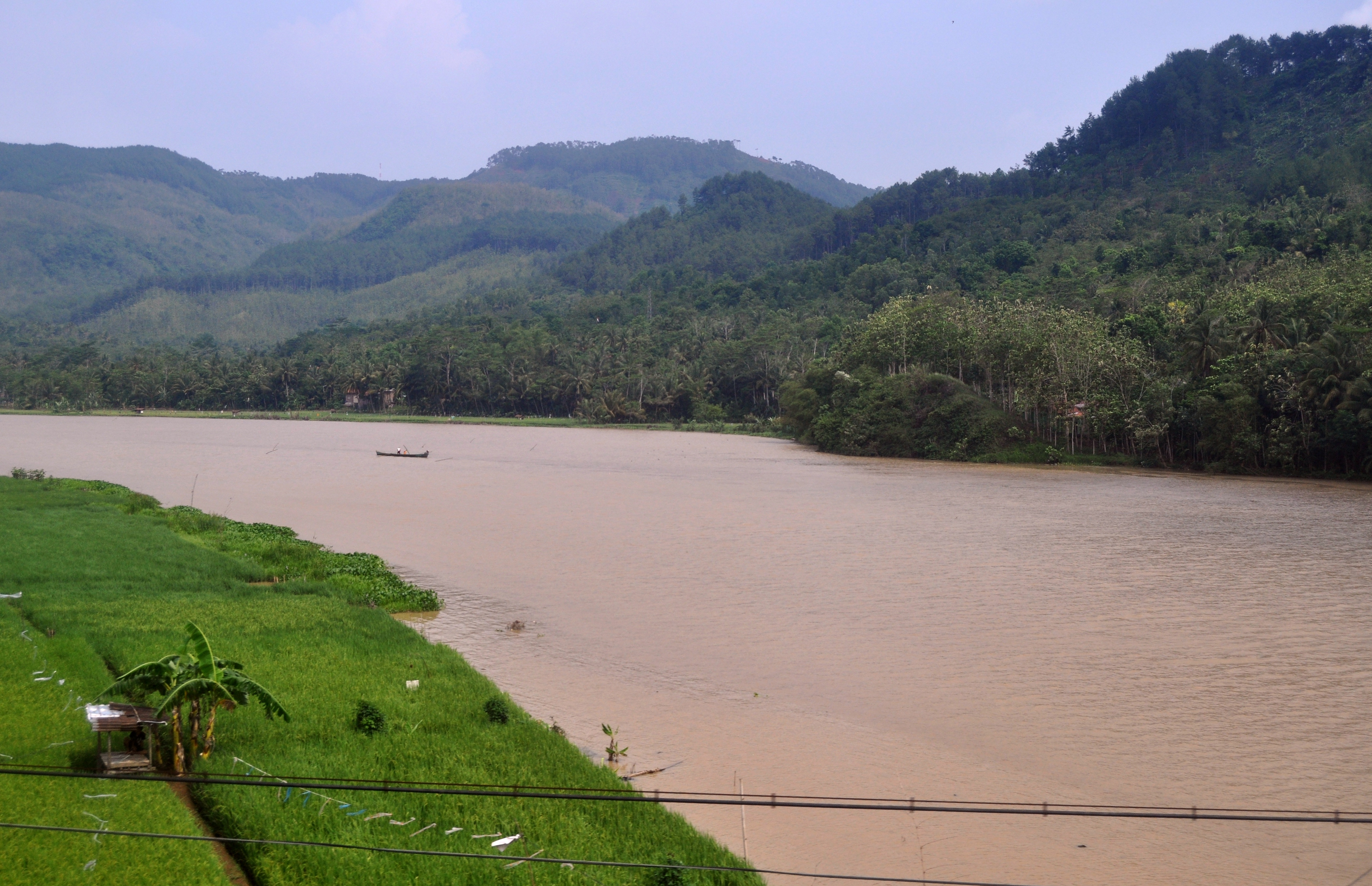
- Serayu river at Kebasen, Banyumas

- Location of river mouth Serayu River (Indonesia)

Location
- Country: Central Java, Indonesia

Physical characteristics
- Source
  - location: Mt. Prahu (Dieng Volcanic Complex)
  - coordinates: 7°18′41.9436″S 109°59′32.8056″E
  - elevation: 2,565 m (8,415 ft)
- Mouth
  - location: Indian Ocean
  - coordinates: 7°41′0.5604″S 109°6′24.9876″E
  - elevation: 0 m (0 ft)
- Length: 181 km (112 mi)
- Basin size: 3,738 km^{2} (1,443 mi^{2}) to 4,375 km^{2} (1,689 mi^{2})
- Discharge
  - location: Near mouth
  - average: (Period: 2005–2014)441.19 m^{3}/s (15,580 cu ft/s) 415 m^{3}/s (14,700 cu ft/s)
  - minimum: (Period: 2005–2014)131.4 m^{3}/s (4,640 cu ft/s)
  - maximum: (Period: 2005–2014)1,370.5 m^{3}/s (48,400 cu ft/s)
- Discharge
  - location: Rawalo (Basin size: 2,631 km^{2} (1,016 sq mi)
  - average: (Period: 1971–1995)273.41 m^{3}/s (9,655 cu ft/s)
  - minimum: (Period: 1971–1995)58.8 m^{3}/s (2,080 cu ft/s)
  - maximum: (Period: 1971–1995)1,497 m^{3}/s (52,900 cu ft/s)
- Discharge
  - location: Banjarnegara (Basin size: 704 km^{2} (272 sq mi)
  - average: (Period: 1978–1995)57.16 m^{3}/s (2,019 cu ft/s)
  - minimum: (Period: 1978–1995)17.3 m^{3}/s (610 cu ft/s)
  - maximum: (Period: 1978–1995)548 m^{3}/s (19,400 cu ft/s)

Basin features
- River system: Serayu River
- Tributaries
  - left: Begaluh, Sapi
  - right: Tulis, Merawu, Klawing, Tajum

The Serayu River is a river in Central Java, Indonesia, about 300 km southeast of the country's capital Jakarta.

== Hydrology ==
The river spanned from northeast to southwest with a length of around 181 km, and crossing five kabupaten (regency) in Central Java; they are Wonosobo Regency, Banjarnegara Regency, Purbalingga Regency, Banyumas Regency, draining to Indian Ocean with estuarine located at Cilacap Regency.

== Geography ==
The river flows in the southern central area of Java with a predominantly tropical monsoon climate (designated as Am in the Köppen-Geiger climate classification). The annual average temperature in the area is 24 °C. The warmest month is March, when the average temperature is around 25 °C, and the coldest is August, at 23 °C. The average annual rainfall is 3897 mm. The wettest month is January, with an average of 561 mm of rainfall, and the driest is September, with 34 mm of rainfall.

== Uses ==
Mrica Dam is a hydroelectric power dam installed in the Serayu River.

Water rafting is one of the tourist attractions in the villages of Tunggara and Prigi, in Banjarnegara Regency.

== Gallery ==
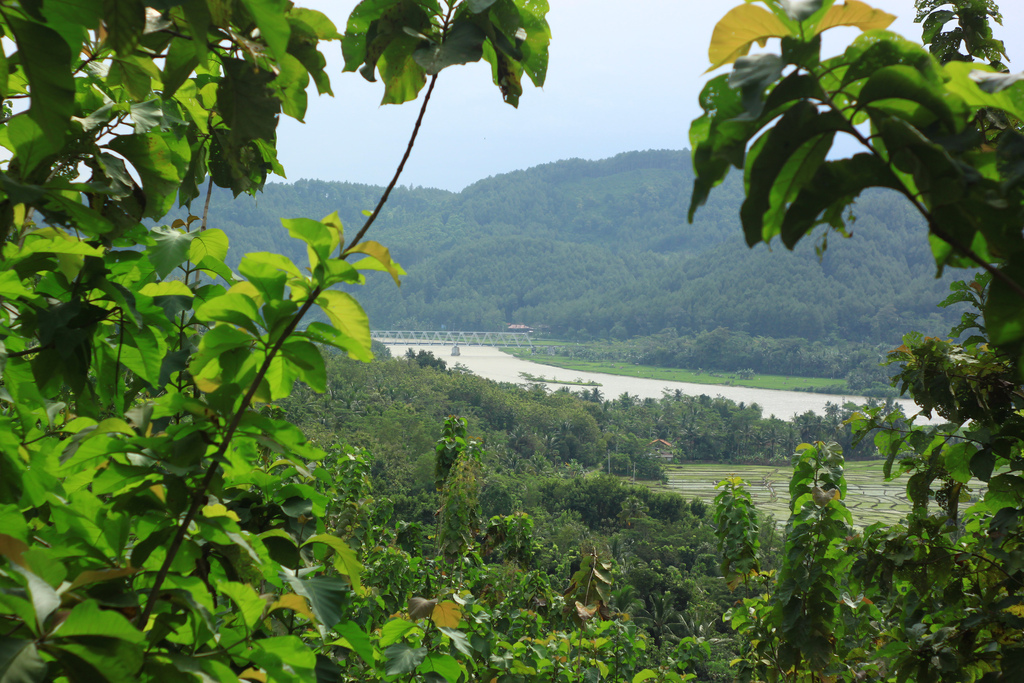
Serayu river

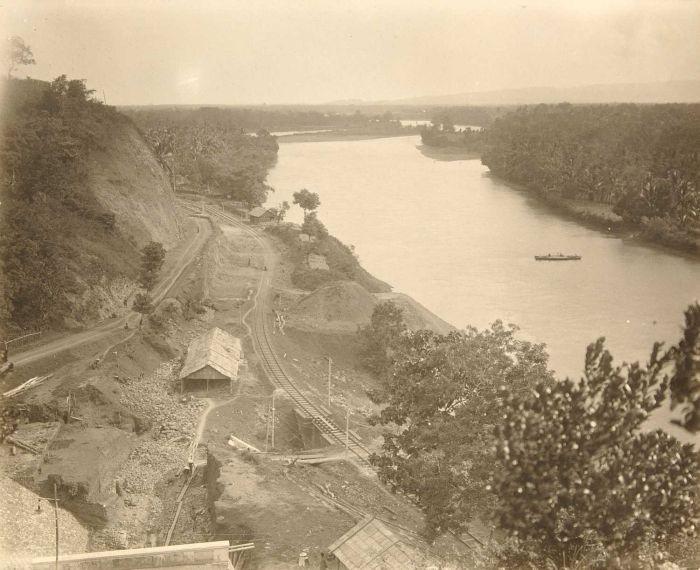
Railroad construction by the Serayu near Kebasen, Banyumas

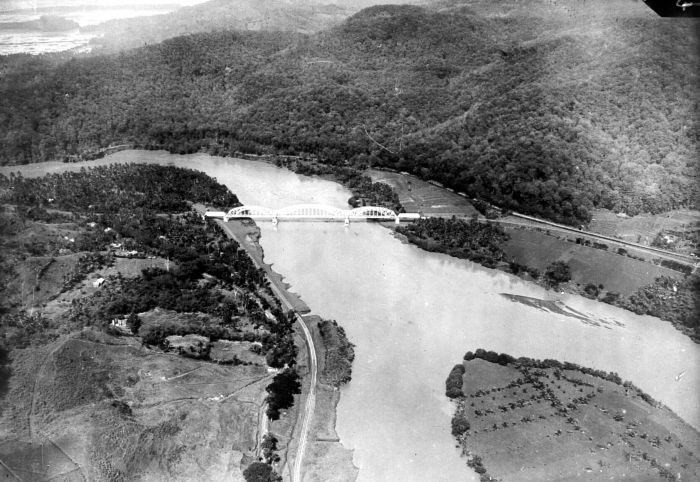
Railroad bridge across Serayu near Kebasen

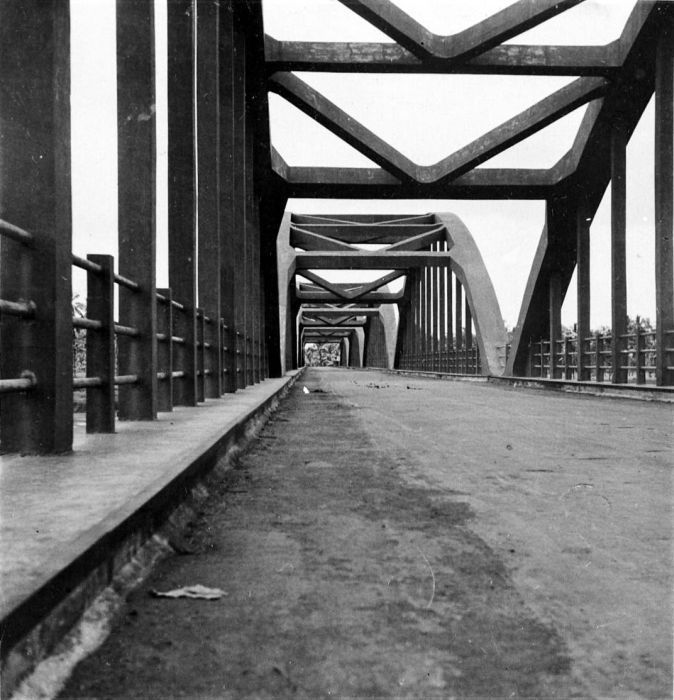
Bridge at Rawalo, Banyumas

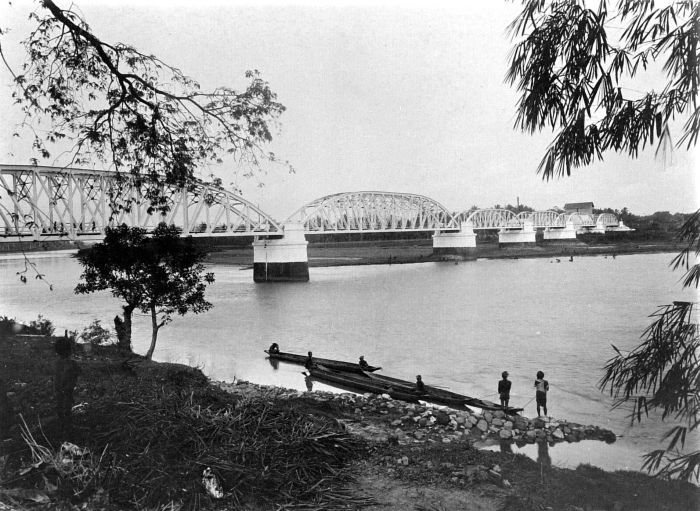
Bridge near Maos, Cilacap (before 1917)

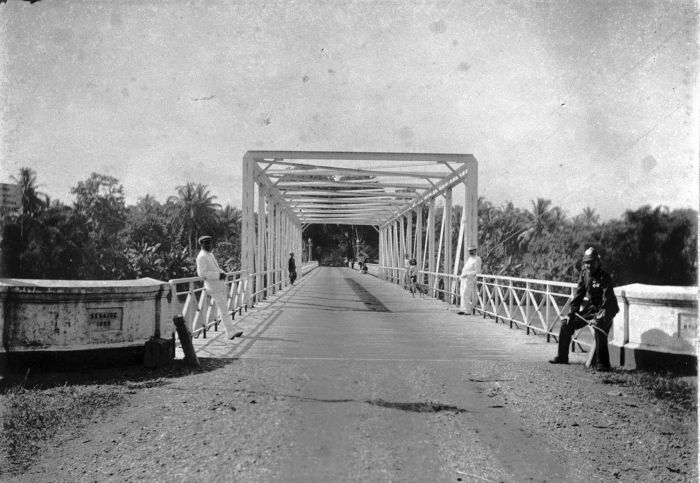
Bridge built in 1890

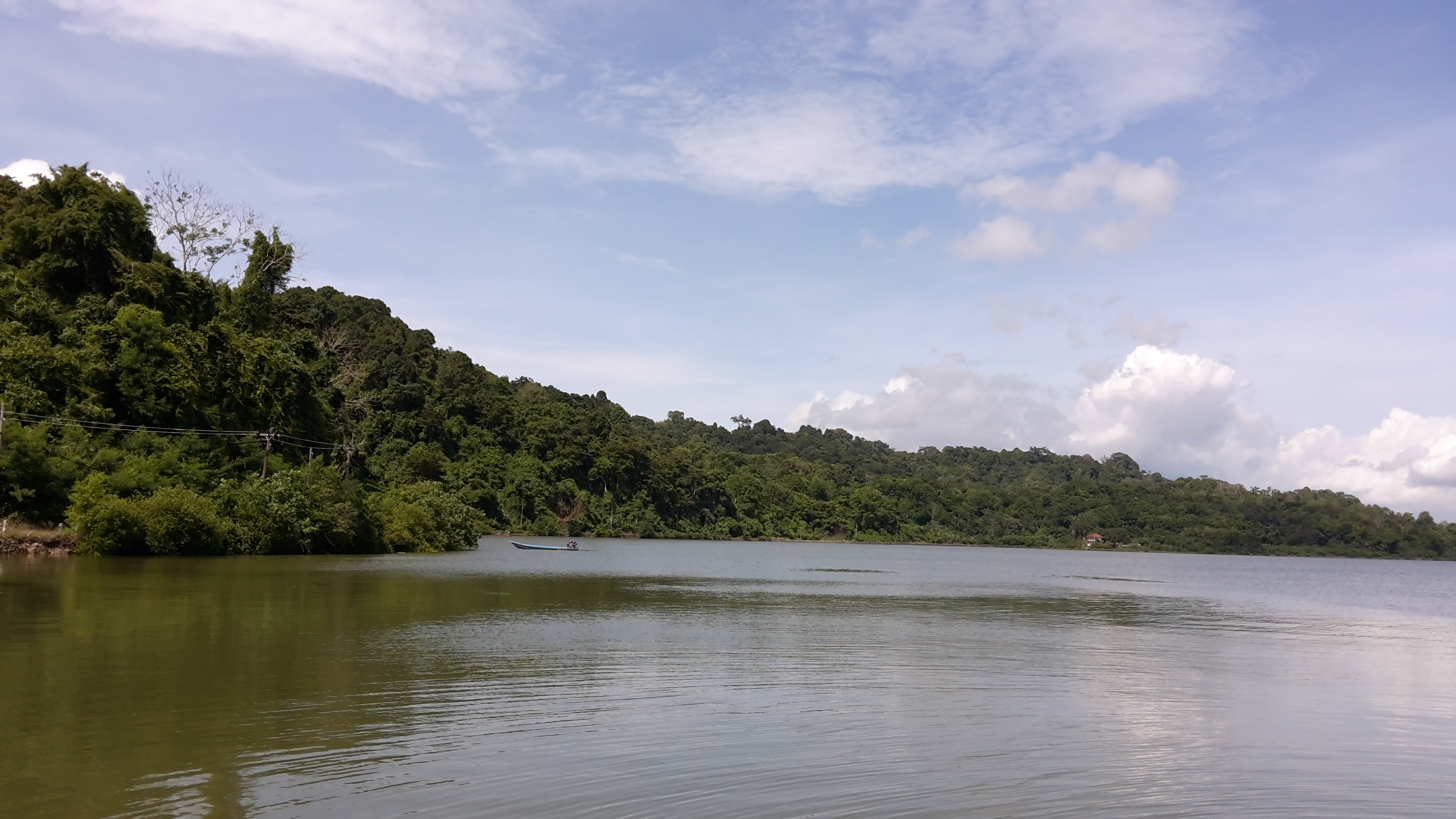
Serayu river

== See also ==
- Sarayu River, in India, Sarayu and Serayu have been named after river in Hindu epic Ramayana
- Sunda Kingdom, Hindu kingdom of Central and Western Java through which this river flowed
- List of drainage basins of Indonesia
- List of rivers of Indonesia
- List of rivers of Java
