= Kalaena River =

Coordinates: 2.6585°S 120.9132°E

Kalaena River Sungai Kalaena, Salo Kalaena, Koro Kaleana
- Location of river mouth Kalaena River (Indonesia)

Location
- Country: Indonesia

Physical characteristics
- Source
  - location: South Sulawesi
- Length: 85 km (53 mi)
- Basin size: 1,476.5 km^{2} (570.1 mi^{2})
- Discharge
  - location: Near mouth
  - average: 104 m^{3}/s (3,700 cu ft/s)

Topographic map of Sulawesi with administrative borders and surrounding islands belonged to the provinces in the island, including Liukang Tangaya and Masalima, South Sulawesi, Bala Balakang, West Sulawesi, and Miangas, North Sulawesi.

Kalaena River is a river in South Sulawesi, Sulawesi island, Indonesia, about 1600 km northeast of the capital Jakarta.

== Geography ==
The river flows in the center of Sulawesi with predominantly tropical rainforest climate (designated as Af in the Köppen-Geiger climate classification). The annual average temperature in the area is 22 °C. The warmest month is September, when the average temperature is around 24 °C, and the coldest is March, at 22 °C. The average annual rainfall is 4176 mm. The wettest month is April, with an average of 660 mm rainfall, and the driest is September, with 117 mm rainfall.

== See also ==
- List of drainage basins of Indonesia
- List of rivers of Indonesia
- List of rivers of Sulawesi
