= Warenai River =

Coordinates: 2.86667°S 135.91667°E

Warenai River Sungai Warenai, Warenai-rivier
- Location of river mouth Warenai River (Indonesia)

Location
- Country: Indonesia

Physical characteristics
- Source
  - location: Central Papua
- Mouth
  - location: Cenderawasih Bay, Nabire Regency
- Length: 304.3 km (189.1 mi)
- Basin size: 4,334.2 km^{2} (1,673.4 mi^{2})
- Discharge
  - average: 317.15 m^{3}/s (11,200 cu ft/s)

The Warenai River is a river in northern New Guinea, Central Papua, Indonesia. Tributaries include the Wapoga River.

== Geography ==
The river flows in the northern area of Papua with predominantly tropical rainforest climate (designated as Af in the Köppen-Geiger climate classification). The annual average temperature in the area is 23 °C. The warmest month is February, when the average temperature is around 24 °C, and the coldest is November, at 22 °C. The average annual rainfall is 5824 mm. The wettest month is March, with an average of 733 mm rainfall, and the driest is October, with 300 mm rainfall.

== See also ==
- List of drainage basins of Indonesia
- List of rivers of Indonesia
- List of rivers of Western New Guinea
