= Brang Biji River =

River in Sumbawa, Indonesia

Brang Biji River Sungai Brang Biji Brang Sumbawa, Brang Soembawa, Soengai Soembawa
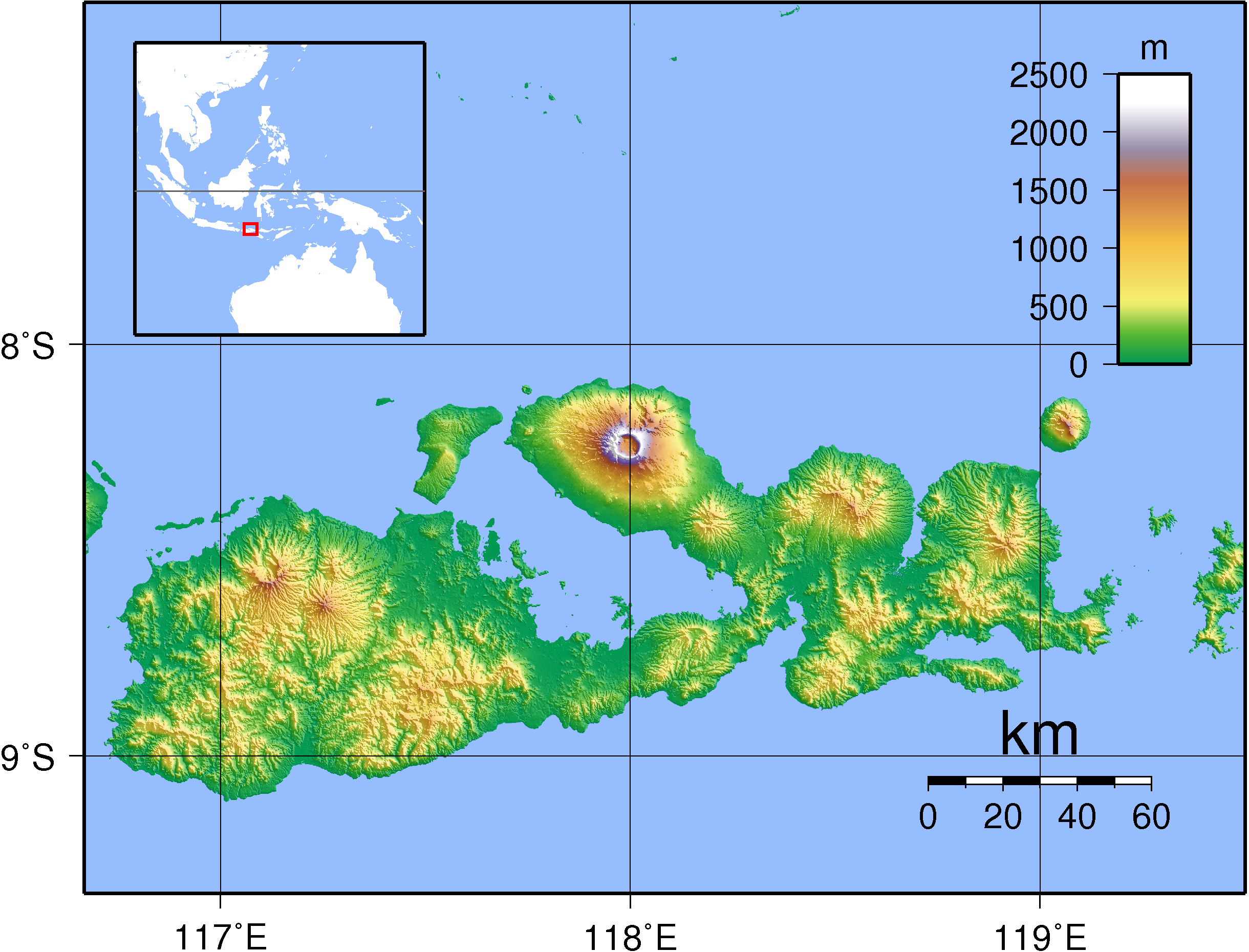
- Location of the mouth Brang Biji River (Indonesia)

Location
- Country: Indonesia
- Province: West Nusa Tenggara
- Region: Sumbawa Regency
- City: Sumbawa Besar

Physical characteristics
- Source
  - location: Batu Lanteh
- Mouth: Flores Sea
  - location: Sumbawa Besar
  - coordinates: 8°27′58″S 117°24′14″E
  - elevation: 0 m (0 ft)

The Brang Biji River (Indonesian: Sungai Brang Biji; in Sumbawarese, "Brang" means "river") is a river in the island of Sumbawa, Indonesia, about 1,200 km east of the capital Jakarta. It is also known as Brang Sumbawa.

== Hydrology ==
The drainage basin of the Brang Biji covers an area of 225 km². The main river has a length of 33.20 km, with an upstream inclination of 17.14%, and the middle part inclination of 5.15%. It flows from south to north, passing Batu Lanteh at upriver and the city of Sumbawa Besar at downriver, into the Flores Sea.

For years, the Brang Biji River suffers from rapid sedimentation, which reduces its water capacity, and decreasing width due to uncontrolled house building along the river banks. These factors contribute to annual flood, submerging houses along the banks in the districts of Bugis, Brang Bara, Pekat, Samapuin, Lempeh and Brang Biji, as happened in February 2017.

The Brang Biji River is also heavily polluted by high concentrations of E-coli and mercury, reaching unsafe levels for people to use for drinking or washing. The pollution is attributed to the unhygienic lifestyle of the community, such as throwing thrash and using the river as a restroom.

== Geography ==
The river flows along the northwestern area of Sumbawa with predominantly tropical savanna climate (designated as As in the Köppen-Geiger climate classification). The annual average temperature in the area is 26 °C. The warmest month is October, when the average temperature is around 30 °C, and the coldest is February, at 24 °C. The average annual rainfall is 1539 mm. The wettest month is January, with an average of 321 mm rainfall, and the driest is August, with 3 mm rainfall.

== See also ==
- List of drainage basins of Indonesia
- List of rivers of Indonesia
- List of rivers of Lesser Sunda Islands
