= Mendawai River =

Mendawai River Soengai Katingin, Soengai Mendawei, Soengai Ketingan, Mendawi, Soengai Katingan
- Mendawai river, near Hurung Port in Kasongan

- Location within Indonesia
- Native name: Sungai Mendawai (Indonesian)

Location
- Country: Indonesia
- Province: Central Kalimantan

Physical characteristics
- Source: Schwaner Mountains
- Mouth: Java Sea
  - location: Pagatan
  - coordinates: 3°5.1242′S 113°18.6542′E
- Length: 616 km (383 mi)
- Basin size: 19,500 km^{2} (7,500 mi^{2})
- Discharge
  - location: Katingan Kuala (Katingan Regency), Java Sea (near mouth)
  - average: 1,414 m^{3}/s (49,900 cu ft/s)
- Discharge
  - location: Kasongan
  - average: 1,279 m^{3}/s (45,200 cu ft/s)

Basin features
- River system: Katingan basin (DAS320369)

Mendawai River or Katingan River is a river of Borneo, it is located in Central Kalimantan, Indonesia. With a total length of 616 km (383 mi). The longhouses of the Pendahara are located along the river in its upper course. The river has its source in the Schwaner Mountain Range.

== Geography ==
The river flows in the southeast area of Borneo with predominantly tropical rainforest climate (designated as Af in the Köppen-Geiger climate classification). The annual average temperature in the area is 22 °C. The warmest month is September, when the average temperature is around 24 °C, and the coldest is December, at 20 °C. The average annual rainfall is 2991 mm. The wettest month is December, with an average of 476 mm rainfall, and the driest is September, with 75 mm rainfall.

== See also ==
- List of drainage basins of Indonesia
- List of rivers of Indonesia
- List of rivers of Kalimantan
