= Kamundan River =

Kamundan River Wai Kamoendan, Soengai Kamoendan, Sungai Kumandan
- Location of river mouth

Location
- Country: Indonesia

Physical characteristics
- Source
  - location: Manokwari Regency, West Papua
- Mouth
  - location: Bintuni Bay, Sorong Selatan Regency
  - coordinates: 2.2882°S 132.6415°E
- Length: 340.6 km (211.6 mi)
- Basin size: 5,865 km^{2} (2,264 mi^{2})
- Discharge
  - location: Near mouth
  - average: 386.45 m^{3}/s (13,647 cu ft/s)

The Kamundan River is a river in southern West Papua province, Indonesia. Kamundan is mostly still natural with the upstream in Manokwari Regency and river mouth at the border of Bintuni Bay and Sorong Selatan Regency. It is also known as the "Sungai Kamundan".

== Geography ==
The river flows in the southern area of West Papua with a predominantly tropical rainforest climate (designated as Af in the Köppen-Geiger climate classification). The annual average temperature in the area is 24 °C. The warmest month is January when the average temperature is around 26 °C, and the coldest is February, at 22 °C. The average annual rainfall is 3744 mm. The wettest month is June, with an average of 484 mm rainfall, and the driest is October, with 153 mm rainfall.

== Ecology ==
The Kamundan River has many trees on both banks as well as clear and calm water. Some species can be found around this river including saltwater crocodiles, primates, a variety of hornbills, yellow-crested cockatoos, and bats.

== See also ==
- List of drainage basins of Indonesia
- List of rivers of Indonesia
- List of rivers of Western New Guinea
- Southern New Guinea freshwater swamp forests
