= Bongka River =

Coordinates: 0.98333°S 121.41667°E

Bongka River Sungai Bongka, Sungai Bangka, Salo Bongka, Sungai Kalingsu, Salo Kalingsoe
- Location of river mouth in Sulawesi Location of river mouth in Indonesia

Location
- Country: Indonesia

Physical characteristics
- Source
  - location: Central Sulawesi
- Mouth: Gulf of Tomini
- Length: 122 km (76 mi)
- Basin size: 3,085 km^{2} (1,191 mi^{2})
- Discharge
  - location: Near mouth
  - average: 132.8 m^{3}/s (4,690 cu ft/s)

The Bongka River is a river in Central Sulawesi, Indonesia, about 1700 km northeast of capital Jakarta

== Geography ==
The river flows in the central area of Sulawesi island with predominantly tropical rainforest climate (designated as Af in the Köppen-Geiger climate classification). The annual average temperature in the area is 23 °C. The warmest month is October, when the average temperature is around 24 °C, and the coldest is April, at 22 °C. The average annual rainfall is 2929 mm. The wettest month is April, with an average of 341 mm rainfall, and the driest is September, with 79 mm rainfall.

Sungai Bongka

Climate chart (precipitation, max. and min. temperature)
J	F	M	A	M	J	J	A	S	O	N	D
217 23 21	167 25 19	243 25 21	341 23 20	339 25 21	287 24 21	338 25 20	256 27 21	79 28 21	128 28 21	280 25 21	255 24 21
- █ Average max. and min. temperatures in °C
- █ Precipitation totals in mm
Imperial conversion
J	F	M	A	M	J	J	A	S	O	N	D
8.5 73 70	6.6 77 66	9.6 77 70	13 73 68	13 77 70	11 75 70	13 77 68	10 81 70	3.1 82 70	5 82 70	11 77 70	10 75 70
- █ Average max. and min. temperatures in °F
- █ Precipitation totals in inches

== See also ==
- List of drainage basins of Indonesia
- List of rivers of Indonesia
- List of rivers of Sulawesi
