= Wiriagar River =

Coordinates: 3.01667°S 135.86667°E

Location
- Country: Indonesia
- State: West Papua

Physical characteristics
- Source
  - location: West Papua
- Mouth: Bintuni Bay
  - location: Weriagar, Teluk Bintuni Regency, West Papua
- Length: 73.6 km (45.7 mi)
- Basin size: 3,873 km^{2} (1,495 mi^{2})
- Discharge
  - average: 239.2 m^{3}/s (8,450 cu ft/s)

Basin features
- River system: Wariagar basin (DAS720146)

The Wiriagar or Aimau River is a river in southern West Papua province, Indonesia.

Wiriagar drainage and its main stem which empties into Bintuni Bay, West Papua

== Geography ==
The river flows in the southern area of West Papua with predominantly tropical rainforest climate (designated as Af in the Köppen-Geiger climate classification). The annual average temperature in the area is 24 °C. The warmest month is January, when the average temperature is around 26 °C, and the coldest is February, at 22 °C. The average annual rainfall is 3744 mm. The wettest month is June, with an average of 484 mm rainfall, and the driest is October, with 153 mm rainfall.

== See also ==
- List of drainage basins of Indonesia
- List of rivers of Indonesia
- List of rivers of Western New Guinea
- Southern New Guinea freshwater swamp forests
