= Paguyaman River =

Coordinates: 0.5175°N 122.6491°E

Paguyaman River Sungai Paguyaman, Dutula Paguyaman, Sungai Pagujaman, Salo Paguyaman, Salo Pagoejaman
- Location of river mouth in Sulawesi Location of river mouth in Indonesia

Location
- Country: Indonesia

Physical characteristics
- Source: Dapi Mountains
  - location: Sulawesi
- Mouth
  - location: Gulf of Tomini
- Length: 136.25 km (84.66 mi)
- Basin size: 2,430.15 km^{2} (938.29 sq mi)

Paguyaman River is a river in Gorontalo (province), Sulawesi island, Indonesia, about 1900 km northeast of capital Jakarta.

== Hydrology ==
Paguyaman River is the largest river in the province of Gorontalo, flowing from west to east, then turning to south, discharging into Gulf of Tomini. The upstream is located in Mount Dapi (1,660 m) or Dapi Mountains at the border between the village Karya Baru, district of Dengilo, and village Hulawa, district of Buntulia in Pohuwato Regency. The river mouth at Gulf of Tomini is located at the border between village Girisa, district of Paguyaman, Boalemo Regency and village Bilato, district Boliyohuto, Gorontalo Regency.

From upstream to the middle Paguyaman river passes through district of Dengilo, Pohuwato Regency, districts of Mananggu, Botumoito, Dulupi, Wonosari, and Paguyaman in Boalemo Regency. From the middle to the downstream it flows through districts of Asparaga, and Boliyohuto in Gorontalo Regency. It is the main river in the watershed area (Daerah Aliran Sungai/DAS) of Paguyaman which covers an area of 2,430.15 km^{2} (938.29 sq mi). The upstream area of Paguyaman River is on the high plain of mountains with a deep contour, whereas the middle part is a low plain/alluvial. Near the downstream, Paguyaman cuts through the low mountains of Batulayar until discharging in the coastal zone with an elevation less than 1.0 m above the sea level. The length of the river is about 136.25 km with the average slope of riverbed at 0.0018.

=== Tributaries ===
Paguyaman River has about 146 tributaries, the bigger ones, among others:

1. Hulawalu River
2. Diloniyohu River
3. Bango River
4. Odimita River
5. Bululi River
6. Nantu Diyanga River
7. Mohiyolo River
8. Daenaa River
9. Olimbikau River
10. Moliliulo River
11. Tilembede River

== Geography ==
Dutula Paguyaman

Climate chart (precipitation, max. and min. temperature)
| J | F | M | A | M | J | J | A | S | O | N | D |
| 137 23 23 | 128 22 20 | 155 24 22 | 241 27 23 | 241 24 22 | 194 23 21 | 270 23 21 | 140 24 22 | 53 27 23 | 112 27 24 | 205 25 23 | 258 26 23 |
- █ Average max. and min. temperatures in °C
- █ Precipitation totals in mm
Imperial conversion
| J | F | M | A | M | J | J | A | S | O | N | D |
| 5.4 73 73 | 5 72 68 | 6.1 75 72 | 9.5 81 73 | 9.5 75 72 | 7.6 73 70 | 11 73 70 | 5.5 75 72 | 2.1 81 73 | 4.4 81 75 | 8.1 77 73 | 10 79 73 |
- █ Average max. and min. temperatures in °F
- █ Precipitation totals in inches

The river flows in the northern area of Sulawesi island with predominantly tropical rainforest climate (designated as Af in the Köppen-Geiger climate classification). The annual average temperature in the area is 23 °C. The warmest month is October, when the average temperature is around 26 °C, and the coldest is February, at 21 °C. The average annual rainfall is 2133 mm. The wettest month is July, with an average of 270 mm rainfall, and the driest is September, with 53 mm rainfall.

== See also ==
- List of drainage basins of Indonesia
- List of rivers of Indonesia
- List of rivers of Sulawesi
