= Moyo River =

River in Indonesia

Coordinates: 8.4621°S 117.4789°E

Moyo River Brang Moyo, Sungai Brang Moyo, Brang Mojo, Mojo River
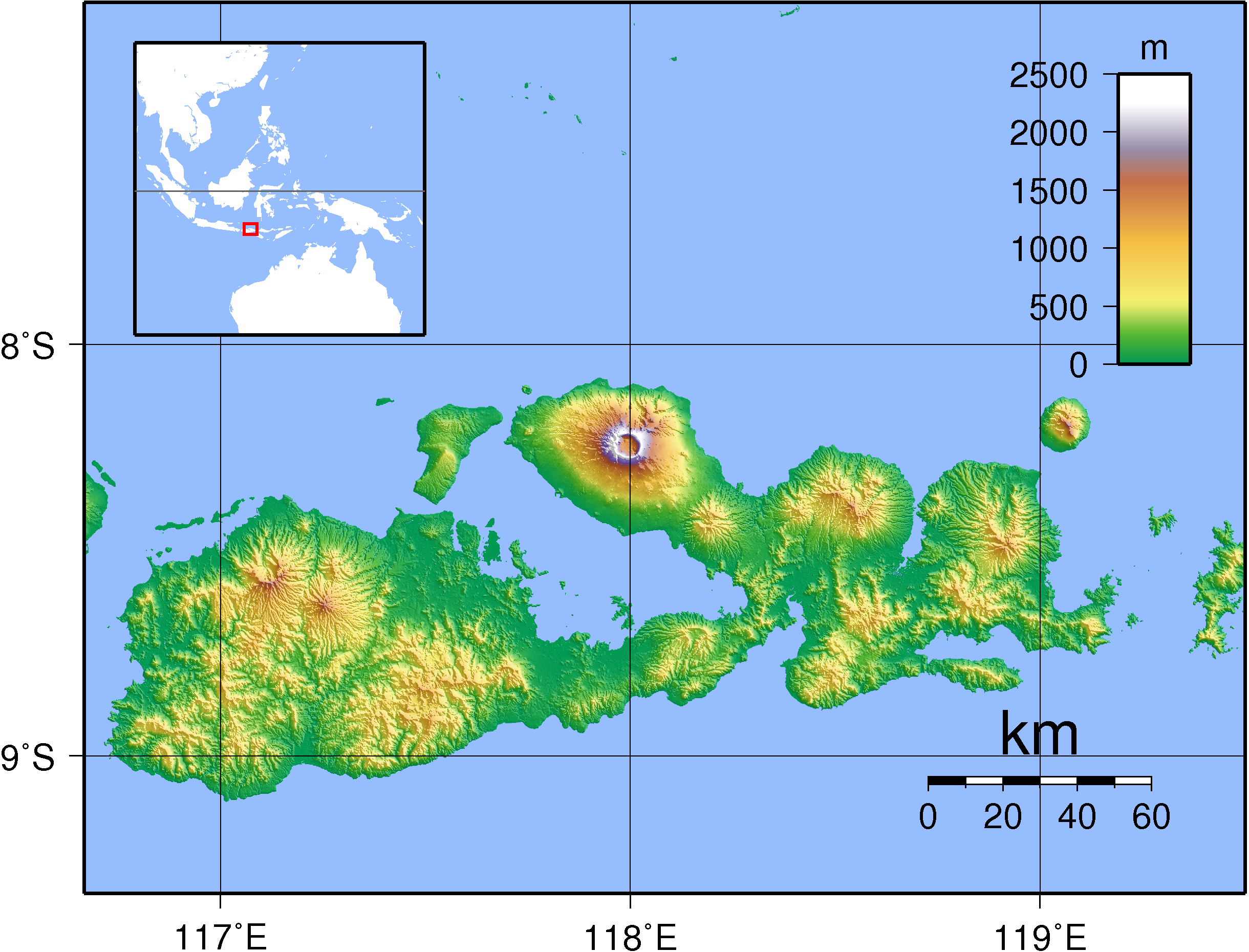
- Location of the mouth Moyo River (Indonesia)

Location
- Country: Indonesia

Physical characteristics
- Source
  - location: Sumbawa
- Mouth
  - location: West Nusa Tenggara

The Moyo River is a river of Sumbawa, West Nusa Tenggara province, Indonesia, about 1200 km east of capital Jakarta.

== Geography ==
The river flows along the northwestern area of Sumbawa with predominantly tropical savanna climate (designated as As in the Köppen-Geiger climate classification). The annual average temperature in the area is 26 °C. The warmest month is October, when the average temperature is around 30 °C, and the coldest is February, at 24 °C. The average annual rainfall is 1456 mm.. The wettest month is January, with an average of 294 mm rainfall, and the driest is August, with 19 mm rainfall.

== See also ==
- List of drainage basins of Indonesia
- List of rivers of Indonesia
- List of rivers of Lesser Sunda Islands
