= Maro River =

Coordinates: 8.4734°S 140.3503°E

Maro River Sungai Merauke, Merauke-rivier, Merauki River
- Location of river mouth in Papua Location of river mouth in Indonesia

Location
- Countries: Papua New Guinea, Indonesia
- Region: Western New Guinea

Physical characteristics
- Source
  - location: Maoke Mountains
- Mouth
  - location: Arafura Sea
- Length: 382.98 km (237.97 mi)
- Basin size: 8,100.6 km^{2} (3,127.7 mi^{2})
- Width
  - minimum: 48 m (157 ft)
  - maximum: 900.1 m (2,953 ft)
- Discharge
  - location: Near mouth
  - average: 262.35 m^{3}/s (9,265 cu ft/s)

The Maro River, also known as Sungai Merauke, Merauke-rivier, or Merauki River, is a river that flows in Merauke Regency, South Papua, Indonesia. It is located just to the west of the Bensbach River of Western Province, Papua New Guinea.

== Hydrology ==
The Maro flows from north-east to south-west, into the Arafura Sea. Its total length is 207 km and its width is around 48 - 900.1 m. The river is strongly tidal for most of its length and its lower reaches are affected by salt water. The main tributaries are Obat, also known as Oba. Associated with the river is a complex system of swamps and oxbow lakes which are of great importance for a large number of birds and reptiles. The Maro River borders the northern side of Wasur National Park.

== Geography ==
The river flows in the southern area of Papua with a predominantly tropical savannah climate (designated as Aw in the Köppen-Geiger climate classification). The annual average temperature in the area is 23 °C. The warmest month is September when the average temperature is around 26 °C, and the coldest is May, at 21 °C. The average annual rainfall is 2238 mm. The wettest month is February, with an average of 445 mm of rainfall, and the driest is August, with 29 mm of rainfall.

== See also ==
- List of drainage basins of Indonesia
- List of rivers of Indonesia
- List of rivers of Western New Guinea
