= Oyo River =

Oyo River Sungai Oyo, Kali Oyo, Kali Ojo, Sungai Oya, Kali Oja
- Location of river mouth Oyo River (Indonesia)

Location
- Country: Indonesia
- State: Yogyakarta
- Region: Bantul Regency, Wonogiri Regency

Physical characteristics
- Source
  - location: Wonogiri Regency
- Mouth: Opak River
  - location: Bantul Regency
  - coordinates: 7.95583°S 110.36583°E

The Oyo River is a river in southern Central Java and Yogyakarta, in the central south area of Java island, Indonesia. It is a tributary of the Opak River.

It was the river on which the historical palaces of Mataram were located - Sultan Agung's Karta palace, and his son's Plered palace.

== Geography ==
The river flows in the southwest area of Java with predominantly tropical monsoon climate (designated as Am in the Köppen-Geiger climate classification). The annual average temperature in the area is 23 °C. The warmest month is October, when the average temperature is around 24 °C, and the coldest is January, at 22 °C. The average annual rainfall is 2970 mm. The wettest month is January, with an average of 537 mm rainfall, and the driest is September, with 22 mm rainfall.

== See also ==
- List of drainage basins of Indonesia
- List of rivers of Java
- List of rivers of Indonesia
