= Dodokan River =

Dodokan
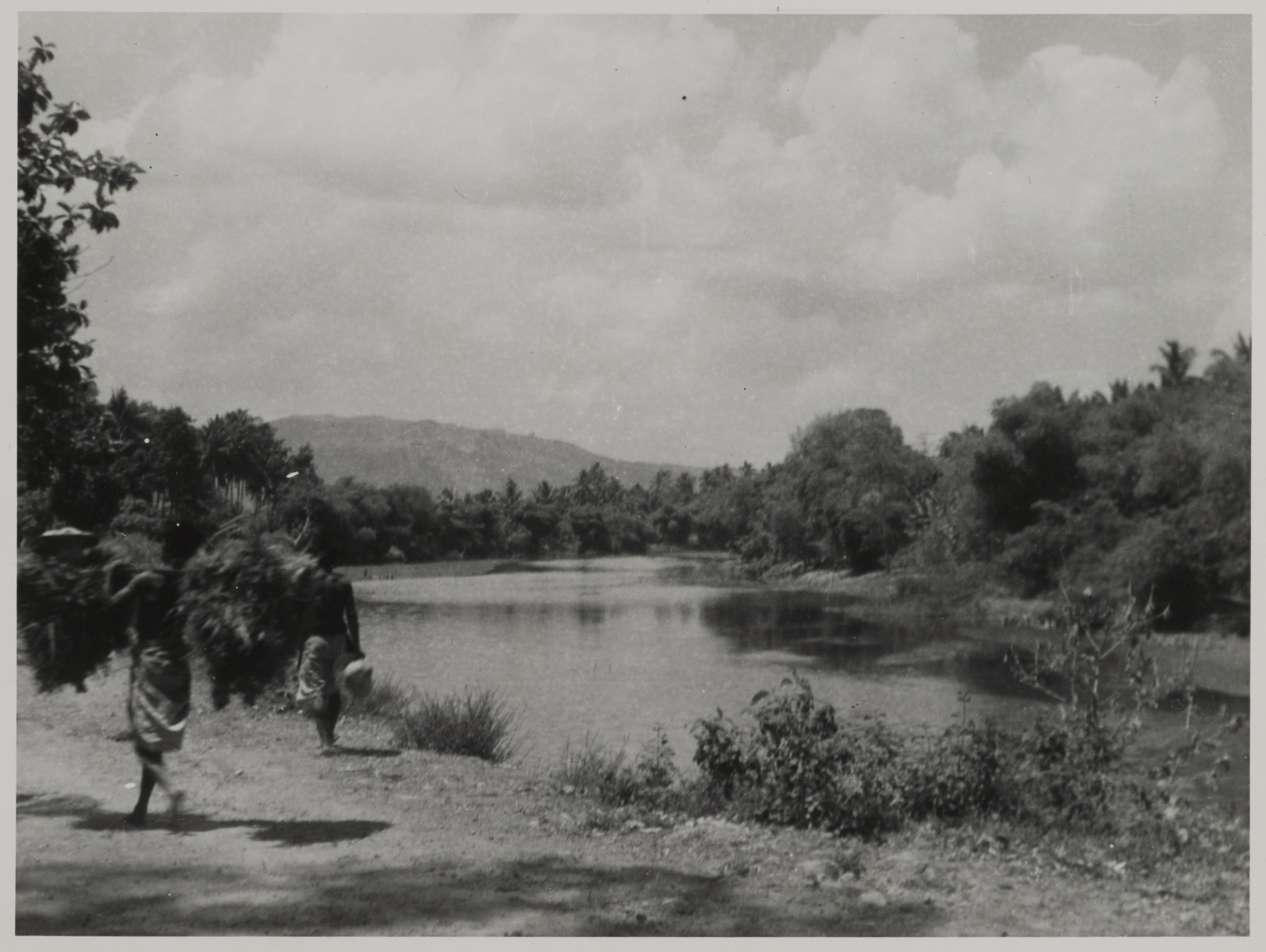
- The Dodokan in 1946

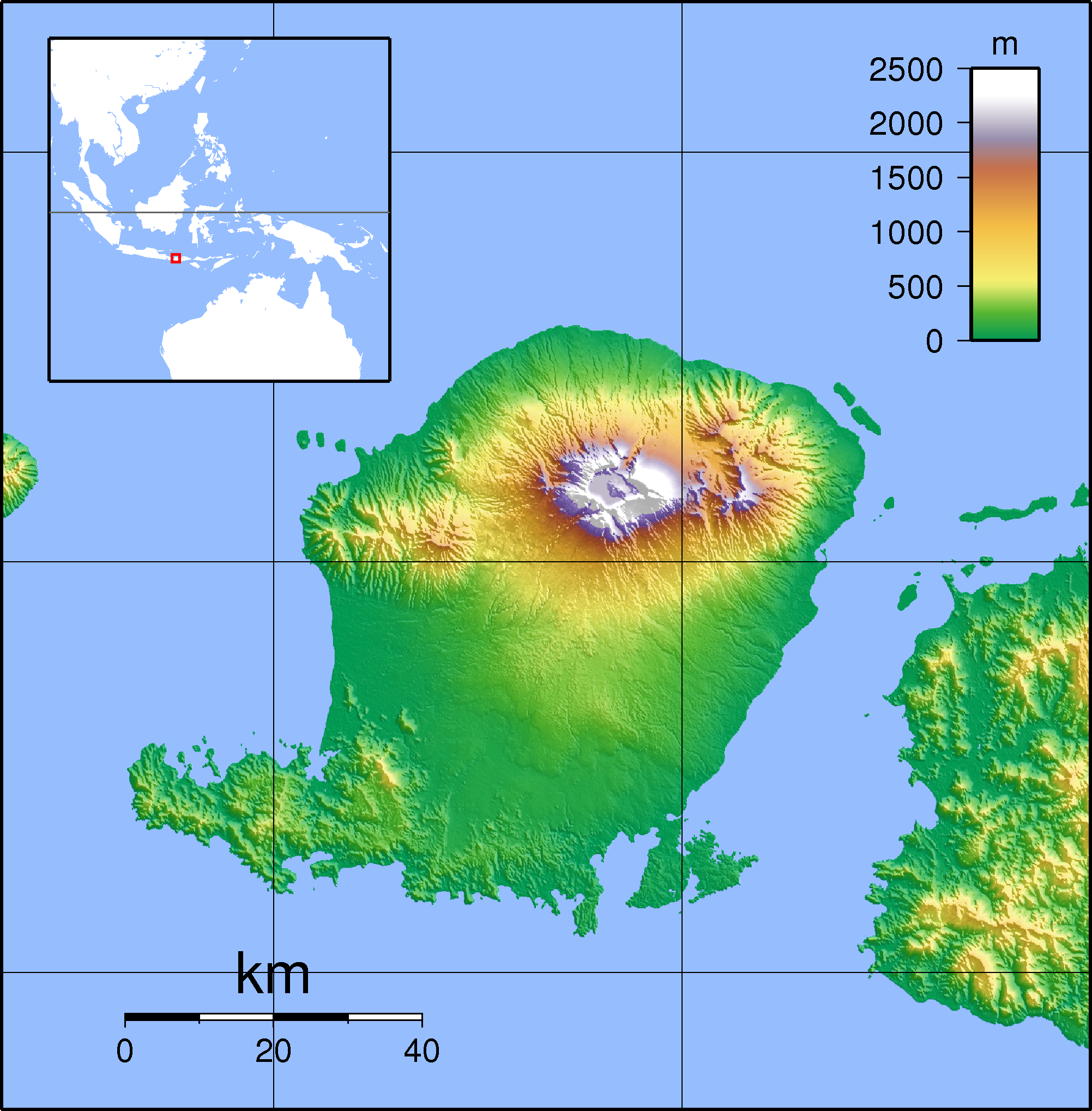
- Location of river mouth

Location
- Country: Indonesia
- Province: West Nusa Tenggara
- Municipalities: Central Lombok, West Lombok

Physical characteristics
- Mouth: Lombok Strait
  - coordinates: 8°40′42″S 116°4′10″E
- Length: 64 km (40 mi)
- Basin size: 579 km^{2}

The Dodokan River is a river that flows in the island of Lombok, in West Nusa Tenggara, Indonesia.

== Course ==
The furthest headwaters of the Dodokan originates from Batukliang, Central Lombok Regency, and flows in a westerly direction. During the course of the river, there are two dams that had been erected - the Batujai Dam and then the Pengga Dam. After the Pengga Dam, it flows for a further 23.3 km before reaching the Lombok Strait. Its total length is 64 km.

=== Watershed ===
Dodokan's watershed is the largest by area in Lombok Island, with a total area of 578.62 km^{2} and covering much of the southwestern portion of the island. Aside from the major dams along the main course, there are tens of smaller retention basin in the watershed.

== Use ==
The river mouth, which includes a mangrove forest, is a local tourist destination, due to relatively clear waters and extensive surrounding vegetation.

== See also ==
- List of drainage basins of Indonesia
