= Karama River =

Coordinates: 2.2993°S 119.1439°E

- Location of river mouth Karama River (Indonesia)

Location
- Country: Indonesia

Physical characteristics
- Source
  - location: West Sulawesi
- Length: 150 km (93 mi)
- Basin size: 5,531 km^{2} (2,136 mi^{2})
- Discharge
  - location: Near mouth
  - average: 281 m^{3}/s (9,900 cu ft/s)

The Karama River is a river on the island of Sulawesi, in the province of West Sulawesi, Indonesia, about 1400 km northeast of the capital Jakarta.

== Geography ==
The river flows in the west area of Sulawesi with predominantly tropical rainforest climate (designated as Af in the Köppen-Geiger climate classification). The annual average temperature in the area is 24 °C. The warmest month is September, when the average temperature is around 27 °C, and the coldest is May, at 22 °C. The average annual rainfall is 2863 mm. The wettest month is May, with an average of 367 mm rainfall, and the driest is September, with 108 mm rainfall.

== See also ==
- List of drainage basins of Indonesia
- List of rivers of Indonesia
- List of rivers of Sulawesi
- Geography of Sulawesi
- Geography of Indonesia
