= Jelai-Bila River =

Coordinates: 2.9876°S 110.73178°E

Jelai-Bila River Sungai Jelai, Sungai Jelai-Bila, Sungai Djelai, Jelai
- Location of river mouth Jelai-Bila River (Indonesia)

Location
- Country: Indonesia

Physical characteristics
- Source
  - location: Kalimantan
- Mouth: Java Sea

The Jelai-Bila River is a river in the far southwest of Central Kalimantan, Indonesia, about 600 km northeast of the capital Jakarta. It has a drainage area of about 7,105 km^{2}. Much of the land between the Lamandau River and the Jelai-Bila River is developed by agriculture.

== Geography ==
The river flows in the central south of Borneo with a predominantly tropical monsoon climate (designated as Am in the Köppen-Geiger climate classification). The annual average temperature in the area is 24 °C. The warmest month is September when the average temperature is around 26 °C, and the coldest is January, at 20 °C. The average annual rainfall is 2760 mm. The wettest month is December, with an average of 531 mm of rainfall, and the driest is September, with 45 mm of rainfall.

== See also ==
- List of drainage basins of Indonesia
- List of rivers of Indonesia
- List of rivers of Kalimantan
