= Wapoga River =

Coordinates: 2.683°S 136.0424°E

Wapoga River Sungai Wapoga, Wai Poga, Wappoya, Wapongga River, Wapoga Rivier, Watoga, Wapangga-rivier
- Location of river mouth Wapoga River (Indonesia)

Location
- Country: Indonesia

Physical characteristics
- Source
  - location: Western Papua
- Mouth
  - location: Cenderawasih Bay, Nabire Regency
- Length: 214.2 km (133.1 mi)
- Basin size: 5,096 km^{2} (1,968 mi^{2})
- Discharge
  - average: 429.64 m^{3}/s (15,173 cu ft/s)

The Wapoga River is a river in northern New Guinea, Central Papua, Indonesia. It is a tributary of the Warenai River. The Wapoga River basin and surrounding mountains were surveyed by a team of scientists organized by Conservation International in 1998. The rainbowfish Glossolepis leggetti and Melanotaenia rubripinnis are only known from this river system.

The Keuw language is spoken within the watershed of the Wapoga River.

== Geography ==
Wapoga River

Climate chart (precipitation, max. and min. temperature)
J	F	M	A	M	J	J	A	S	O	N	D
303 20 17	354 21 19	586 23 19	504 22 21	355 23 21	422 20 19	391 23 21	458 23 20	409 23 21	269 23 22	431 23 21	456 22 19
- █ Average max. and min. temperatures in °C
- █ Precipitation totals in mm
Imperial conversion
J	F	M	A	M	J	J	A	S	O	N	D
12 68 63	14 70 66	23 73 66	20 72 70	14 73 70	17 68 66	15 73 70	18 73 68	16 73 70	11 73 72	17 73 70	18 72 66
- █ Average max. and min. temperatures in °F
- █ Precipitation totals in inches

The river flows in the northern area of Papua with predominantly tropical rainforest climate (designated as Af in the Köppen-Geiger climate classification). The annual average temperature in the area is 21 °C. The warmest month is October, when the average temperature is around 22 °C, and the coldest is January, at 18 °C. The average annual rainfall is 4938 mm. The wettest month is March, with an average of 586 mm rainfall, and the driest is October, with 269 mm rainfall.

== See also ==
- List of drainage basins of Indonesia
- List of rivers of Indonesia
- List of rivers of Western New Guinea
- Wapoga River languages
