= Jangkok River =

Jangkok
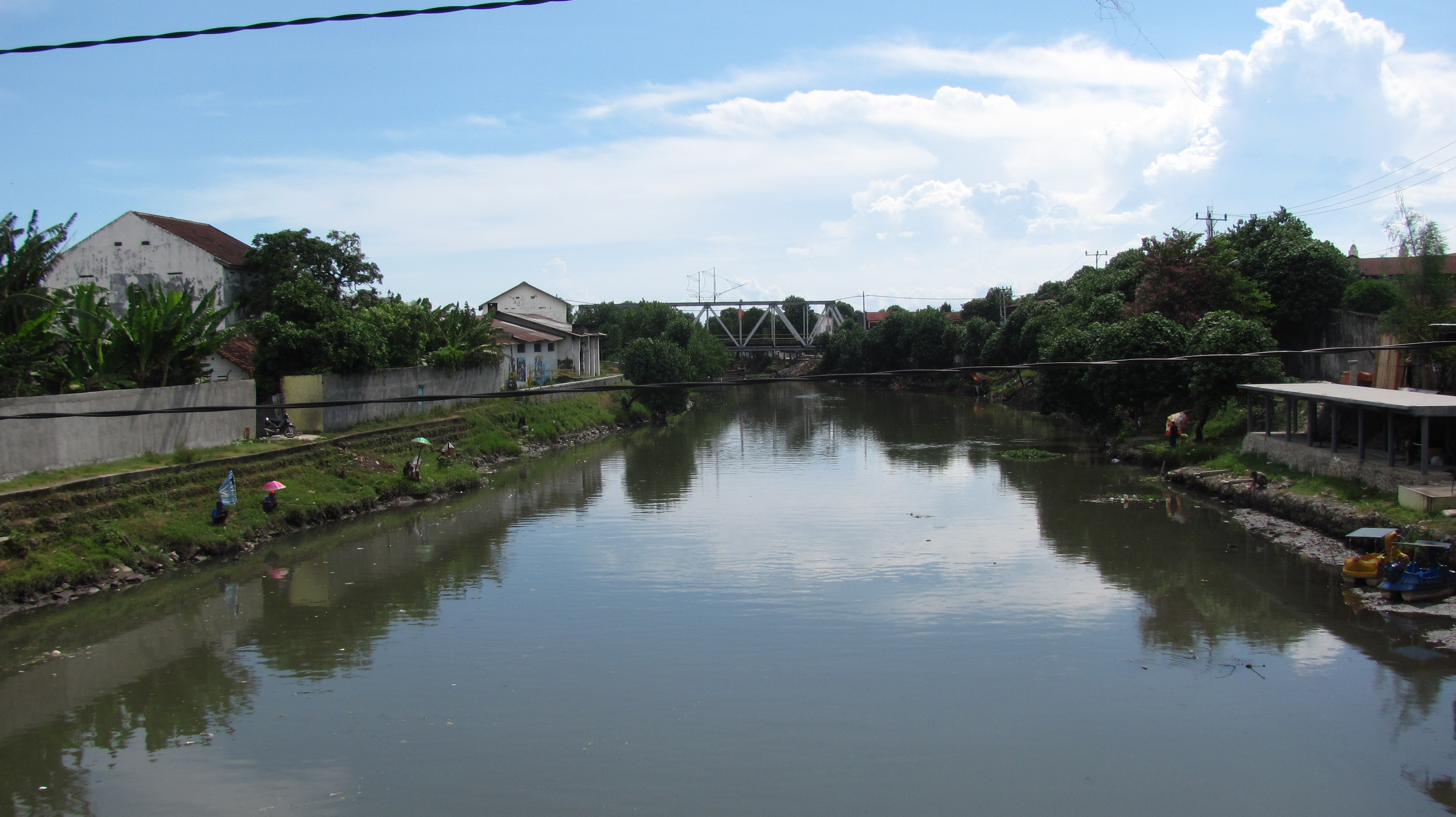
- Jangkok at Ampenan, Mataram

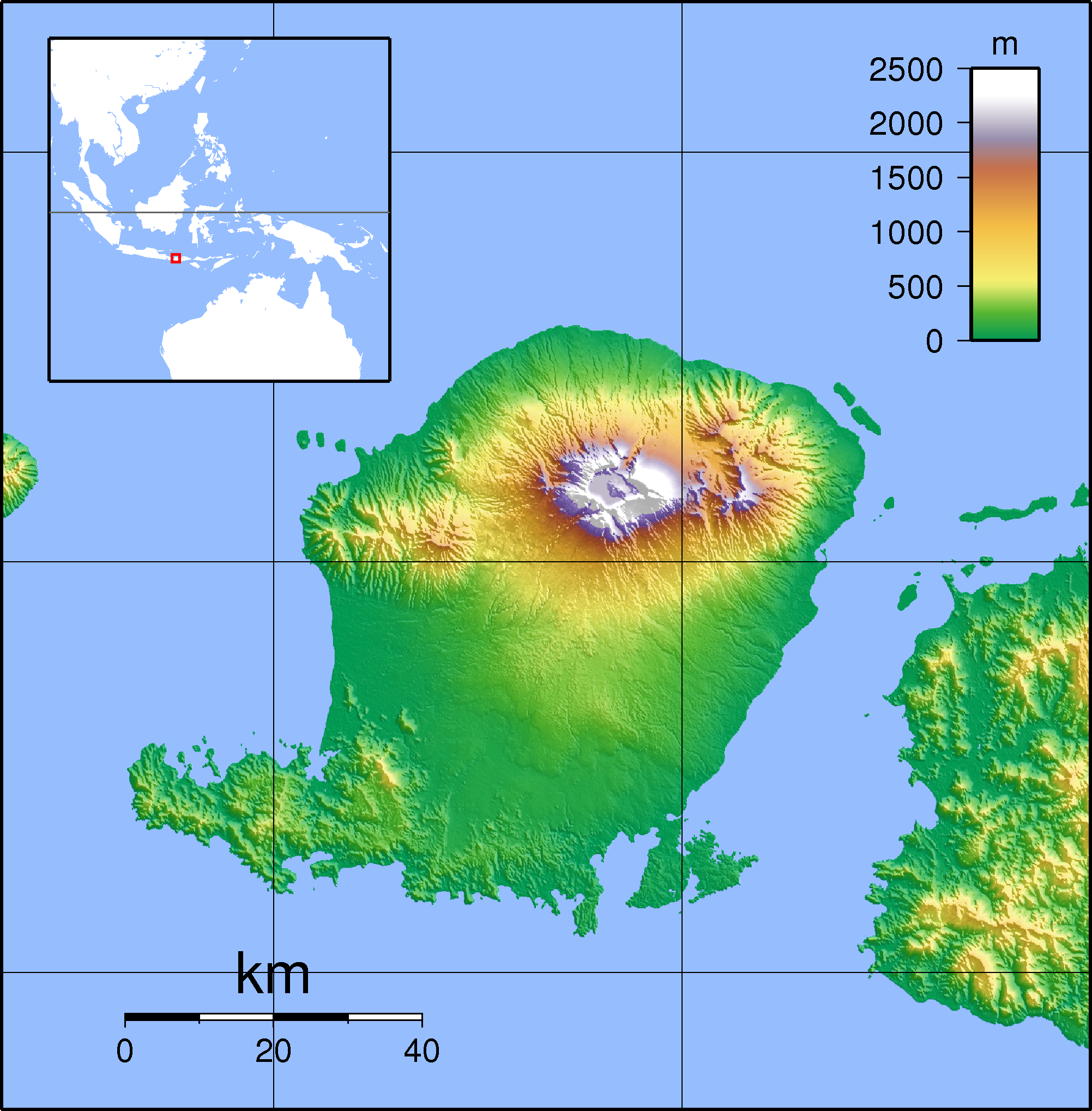
- Location of river mouth

Location
- Country: Indonesia
- Province: West Nusa Tenggara
- Municipalities: Central Lombok; West Lombok; Mataram

Physical characteristics
- Source: Mount Buanmangge
  - elevation: 2600 m
- Mouth: Lombok Strait
  - location: Mataram
  - coordinates: 8°34′27″S 116°4′18″E
- Length: 49 km (30 mi)
- Basin size: 170 km^{2}

The Jangkok River is a river in the island of Lombok, in West Nusa Tenggara, Indonesia. It flows through the provincial capital of Mataram.

== Course ==
The river rises at the slopes of Mount Buanmangge, within the district of Batukliang in Central Lombok Regency, at an elevation of 2600 meters. It follows a dendritic drainage pattern as it descends, following a generally southwesterly direction until it approaches Mataram, when its course turns closer to the west. It has several tributaries, the longest of which is 23 km in length. Jangkok's main course has a length of just under 49 km.

=== Watershed ===
Jangkok has a watershed area of 170.29 km^{2}. Most of Jangkok's watershed is still forested in 2011, with an average annual precipitation of around 800 mm. Close to its mouth, in the city of Mataram, the riverbanks are densely populated and prone to flooding and pollution from household waste. Due to the pollution, the river water is contaminated with heavy metals and E. coli bacteria.

== Use ==
A stretch of the river's headwaters is used for rafting. Micro hydro power plants have been established along its tributaries. Sand is also quarried from the riverbed in some locations.

== See also ==
- List of drainage basins of Indonesia
