= Babak River =

Babak
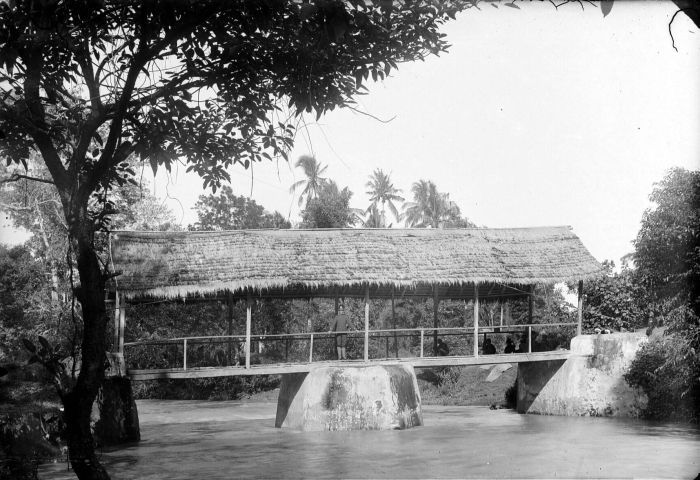
- A bridge over the Babak during the colonial era

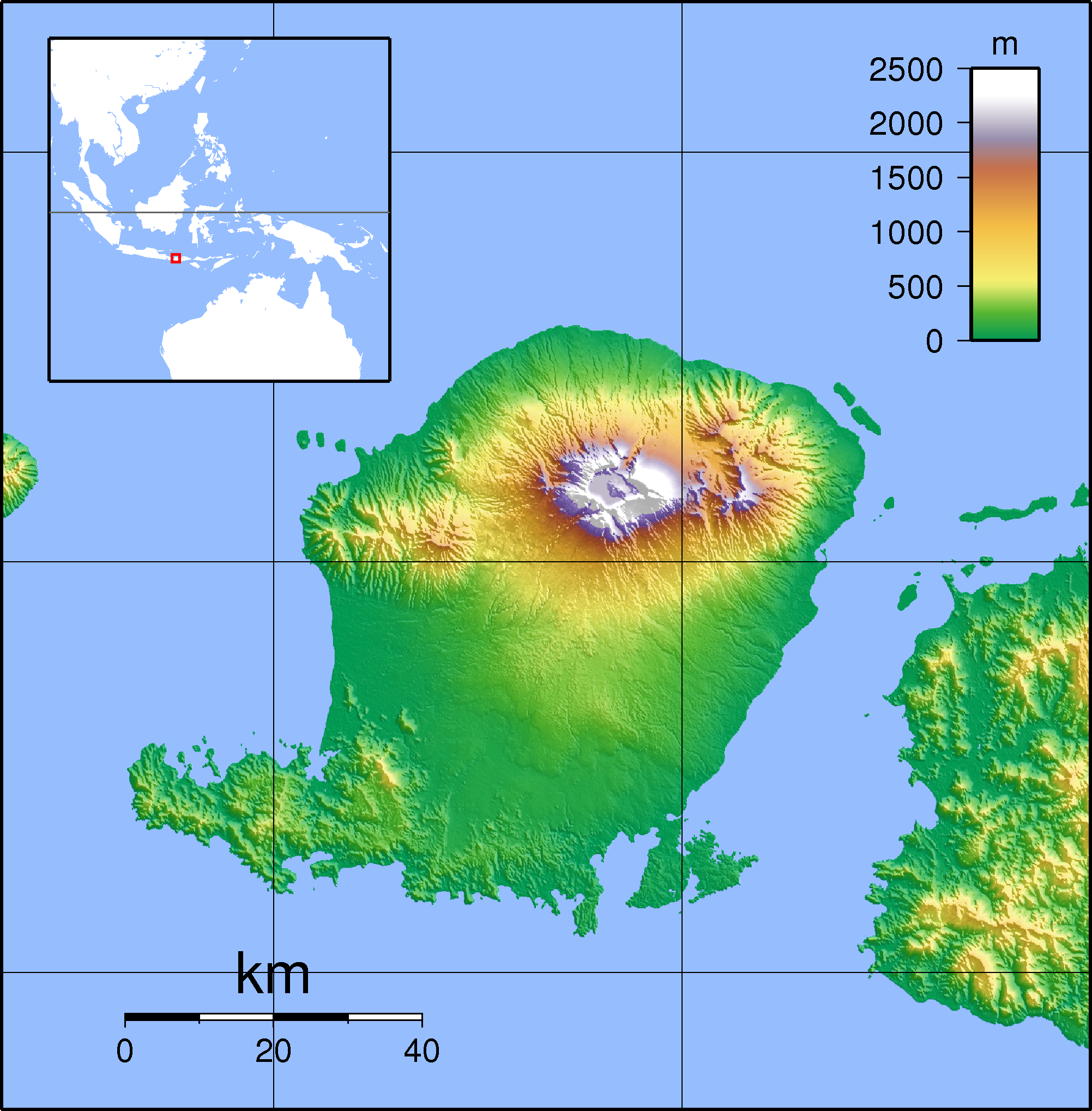
- Location of river mouth

Location
- Country: Indonesia
- Province: West Nusa Tenggara
- Municipalities: East Lombok, Central Lombok, West Lombok

Physical characteristics
- Source: Mount Timanuk
  - elevation: 2575 m
- Mouth: Lombok Strait
  - coordinates: 8°39′34″S 116°4′9″E
- Length: 55 km (34 mi)
- Basin size: 259 km^{2}

The Babak River is a river that flows in the island of Lombok, in West Nusa Tenggara, Indonesia.

== Course ==
It originates at Mount Timanuk in East Lombok Regency, with a source elevation of 2,575 meters. It flows in a southwesterly direction, with a parallel drainage pattern, reaching the Lombok Strait at the district of Labuapi, West Lombok Regency. The length of the river's main course is around 55 km.

=== Watershed ===
The watershed of the river covers an area of 259 km^{2}. Due to the highly seasonal flow of the river, which overflows during monsoon season and dries up during the dry seasons, it is considered a "critical watershed". Since 2007, efforts have been made by local communities to restore forests in the river's basin, reducing the impact of erosion and flooding.

== See also ==
- List of drainage basins of Indonesia
