= Bian River (China) =

Ancient river in Henan, China

The Bian River (Chinese: 汴河; pinyin: Biàn Hé), also known in Chinese as the Bian Shui (汴水), was an ancient river partly located within the borders of Kaifeng City, Henan, China.

Tang dynasty (618–907 CE) poet Pi Rixiu wrote about the river in his Treasured Memories of the Bian River (汴河怀古). Zhang Zeduan features the river running through Kaifeng in his Along the River During the Qingming Festival.
