= Awang Bay =

Bay in Lombok, Indonesia

Coordinates: 8.87°S 116.43°E

Awang Bay (Indonesian: Teluk Awang) is a bay in southeast Lombok, Indonesia, about 800 metres from the village of Ekas. It is a reputable surfing location. Cliffs overlook the bay from both sides.
