= Bian River (Indonesia) =

River in Indonesia

Coordinates: 8.1193°S 139.9411°E

Bian River Wai Bian, Bian-rivier, Sungai Bian
- Location within South Papua Location within Indonesia

Location
- Country: Indonesia
- Province: South Papua
- Regency: Merauke

Physical characteristics
- Source: Butiptiri
  - location: Southeast of Asike
- Mouth: Arafura Sea
  - location: District of Okaba, Merauke
- Length: 580.6 km (360.8 mi)
- Basin size: 8,044.3 km^{2} (3,105.9 mi^{2})
- Width
  - minimum: 70 m (230 ft)
  - maximum: 1,447.1 m (4,748 ft)
- Discharge
  - location: Near mouth
  - average: 392 m^{3}/s (13,800 cu ft/s)

The Bian River or Mbian River is a river in Merauke Regency, South Papua, Indonesia. Its total length is 580.6 km and its width is around 70 – 1447.1 m. Some 900 people in its upper course are said to speak the Bian Marind language.

== Geography ==
The river flows in the southern area of Papua with a predominantly tropical rainforest climate (designated as Af in the Köppen-Geiger climate classification). The annual average temperature in the area is 23 °C. The warmest month is October when the average temperature is around 25 °C, and the coldest is June, at 20 °C. The average annual rainfall is 2952 mm. The wettest month is May, with an average of 405 mm rainfall, and the driest is August, with 62 mm rainfall.

== Ecology ==
In the district of Muting (Merauke Regency), the Bian River is a nature reserve by the order of the Ministry of Forestry as the habitat of various protected flora and fauna, among others: Archerfish and Asian arowana.

== See also ==
- List of drainage basins of Indonesia
- List of rivers of Indonesia
- List of rivers of Western New Guinea
