= Seram Sea =

One of several small seas in Indonesia

- Laut Seram (Indonesian)
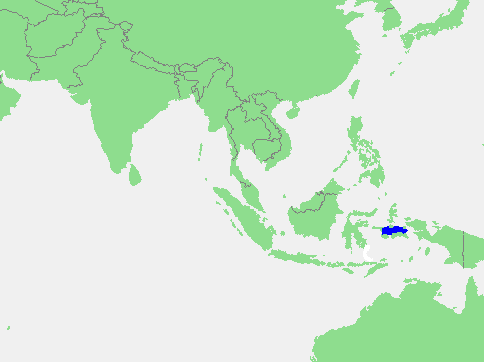
- Location of the Ceram Sea within Southeast Asia

- Location within Indonesia
- Coordinates: 2°20′S 128°00′E
- Type: Sea
- Basin countries: Indonesia
- Surface area: 120,000 km^{2} (46,000 sq mi)

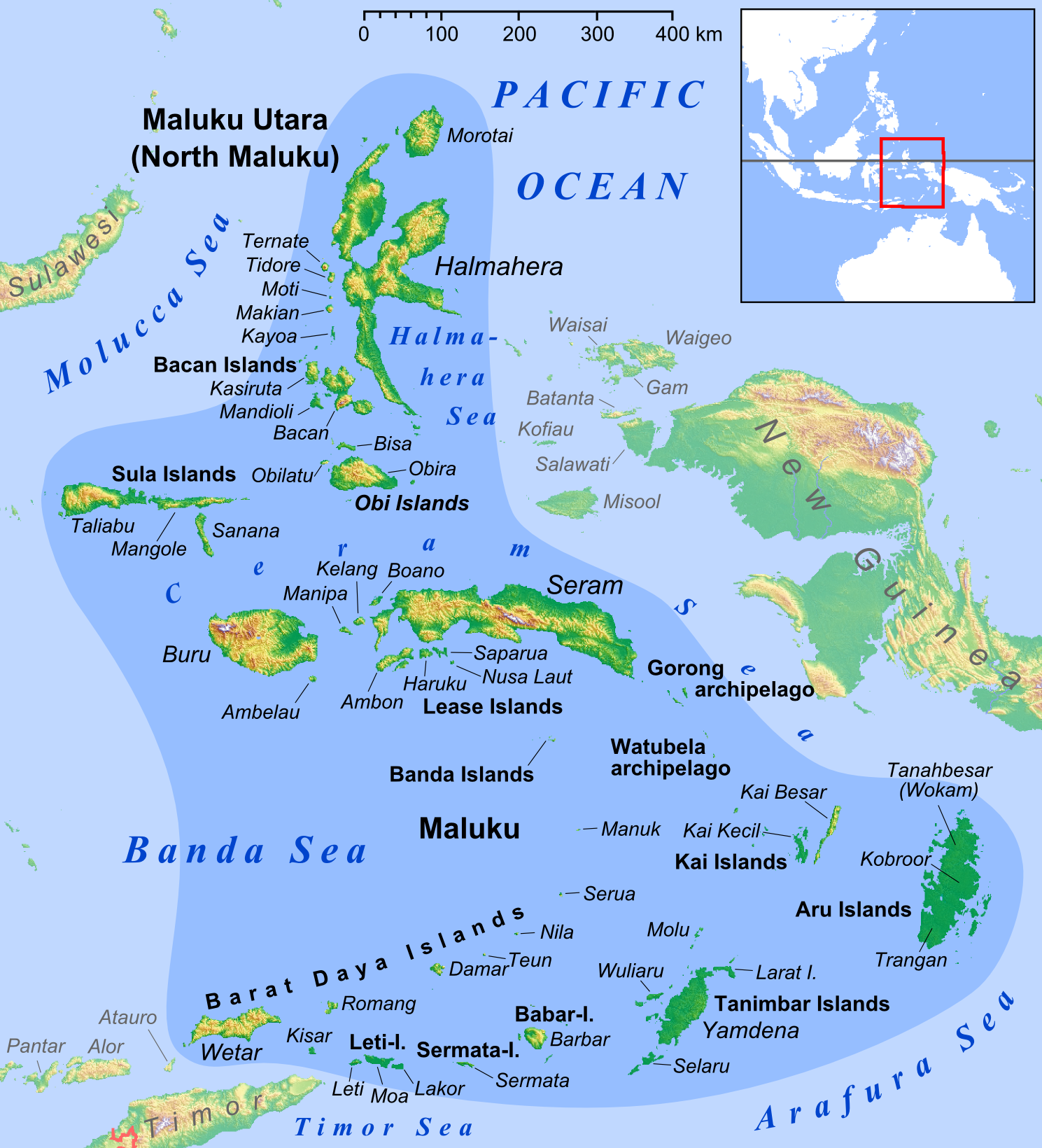
Ceram Sea in the center of Maluku Islands

The Seram Sea or Ceram Sea (Indonesian: Laut Seram) is one of several small seas between the scattered islands of Indonesia. It is a section of the Pacific Ocean with an area of approximately 120,000 km^{2} (46,000 sq mi) located between Buru and Seram, which are two of the islands once called the South Moluccas. These islands are the native habitat of plants long coveted for their use as spices, such as nutmeg, cloves, and black peppercorns, and the seas surrounding them were busy shipping routes. The Seram Sea is also the habitat of several species of tropical goby and many other fish. Like many other small Indonesian seas, the Seram Sea is rocky and very tectonically active.

== Extent ==
The International Hydrographic Organization (IHO) defines the Seram Sea as being one of the waters of the East Indian Archipelago. The IHO defines its limits as follows:

On the North and Northeast. A line from Tanjong Dehekolano, the Eastern extreme of the Soela [Sula] Islands to the Western extreme of Obi, along its Southern coast to Tanjung Serammaloleo its Eastern extreme, thence through Tobalai, Kekeh, Pisang and Kofiau Islands to Tanjong Sele (1°26′S 130°55′E), the Western point of New Guinea, down the coast to Karufa (3°51.5′S 133°27′E).

On the Southeast. A line from Karufa, New Guinea, to the Southeastern extreme of pulau Adi, thence to tanjung Borang, the Northern point of pulau Nuhuyut [Kai Besar] (5°17′S 133°09′E).

On the Southwest and South. From the Northern point of pulau Nuhuyut (Groot Kai) through the Watubela and Gorong Islands to the Southeastern extreme of Ceram, along its Northern shore to Tanjung Tandurubesar, the Northwest point, thence a line to Tanjung Baturuhan, the Northern extreme of Buru [Buru], and along the coast to Tanjung Palpetu, the Northwest point of the Island.

On the West. A line from Tanjung Palpetu to Tanjung Waka, the Southern point of pulau Sanana, through this island to its Northern point, thence across the Mangoli Strait to the South coast of Mangole (Sula Islands) in [1°56′S 125°55′E].
