= List of drainage basins of Indonesia =

This is a list of river catchment areas, also known as drainage basins, in Indonesia.

Based on the National River Basin Classification map, Indonesia has a total of 42,210 river basins organized as a basis for determining watershed management policies. The policy decisions are based on various criteria such as land conditions (critical land, land cover, erosion), water quality, water quantity, water continuity, socio-economic factors, investment in soil and water conservation structures, as well as spatial utilization.

In the National Medium-Term Development Plan (RPJMN) for the period 2015–2019, there were 15 priority river basins (indicated in yellow) out of 108 designated priority river basins in the Integrated River Basin Management Plan (RPDAST) according to Decree No. 328/Menhut-II/2009. Additionally, there are 9 river basins categorized as disaster-prone areas. Going forward, all the 108 designated priority river basins in the RPDAST will be given priority, particularly for the implementation of soil and water conservation activities during the 2020-2024 period.

== Codification ==
The River Basin Codification is a code that has been structured in such a way that each digit has a unique meaning that can distinguish two or more river basins with the same name. The codification of each river basin is created using 9 (nine) digits.

The first three digits (in blue) represent the thematic classification of the data, which is the river basin (DAS). This is to help users easily identify that the theme refers to river basins.

The fourth digit (in purple) represents the region of the River Basin (where the River Basin is located). The region codes start from the western part of the island, in the following order:

- Sumatra = 1
- Java and Madura = 2
- Kalimantan = 3
- Bali and Nusa Tenggara = 4
- Sulawesi = 5
- Maluku = 6
- Papua = 7

The fifth digit (in yellow) represents the inter-basins (coverage of river basin in one or more administrative regions). The reference administrative map used is the Bakosurtanal (Geospatial Information Agency) administrative map, with the following order:

- Within one Regency/City = 1
- Across Regencies/Cities = 2
- Across Provinces = 3
- Across Countries = 4

The last four digits (in green) represent the serial number of the river basin. The numbering of river basins follows the map index boxes of the 1:250,000 scale map, starting from the western part of the main island (the largest island), followed by smaller surrounding islands from the west.

Example, the Citarum basin has a code "DAS220047". The code indicates the Citarum Basin is located in the Java region, it is an inter-regency/city river basin and it is the 47th serial number in the Java region.

== Basin list ==
Here are several river basins in Indonesia, especially those located on the major islands:

| River system | Code | Area (km^{2}) | Empties into | Island | Basins management unit |
|---|---|---|---|---|---|
| Tukad Saba | DAS420024 | 146 | Java Sea | Bali | BPDAS Unda Anyar |
| Tukad Daya | DAS420044 | 92 | Java Sea | Bali | BPDAS Unda Anyar |
| Tukad Blingkang | DAS420081 | 119 | Java Sea | Bali | BPDAS Unda Anyar |
| Tukad Sringin | DAS410084 | 82 | Java Sea | Bali | BPDAS Unda Anyar |
| Tukad Unda | DAS420133 | 223.06 | Badung Strait | Bali | BPDAS Unda Anyar |
| Tukad Ayung | DAS420151 | 303.26 | Badung Strait | Bali | BPDAS Unda Anyar |
| Tukad Penet | DAS420169 | 237 | Bali Strait | Bali | BPDAS Unda Anyar |
| Tukad Balian | DAS420184 | 154.64 | Bali Strait | Bali | BPDAS Unda Anyar |
| Tukad Ijogading | DAS410198 | 209 | Bali Strait | Bali | BPDAS Unda Anyar |
| Layang | DAS110591 | 432 | Kelabat Bay | Bangka | BPDAS Baturusa Cerucuk |
| Babar | DAS120590 | 322 | Kelabat Bay | Bangka | BPDAS Baturusa Cerucuk |
| Ulin | DAS110651 | 323 | Bangka Strait | Bangka | BPDAS Baturusa Cerucuk |
| Balar | DAS110652 | 577 | Bangka Strait | Bangka | BPDAS Baturusa Cerucuk |
| Kampa | DAS110684 | 445 | South China Sea | Bangka | BPDAS Baturusa Cerucuk |
| Baturusa | DAS120611 | 680 | South China Sea | Bangka | BPDAS Baturusa Cerucuk |
| Kurau | DAS120614 | 714 | South China Sea | Bangka | BPDAS Baturusa Cerucuk |
| Bangkakota | DAS120657 | 548 | Bangka Strait | Bangka | BPDAS Baturusa Cerucuk |
| Selan | DAS120658 | 633 | Bangka Strait | Bangka | BPDAS Baturusa Cerucuk |
| Menduk | DAS120660 | 432 | Bangka Strait | Bangka | BPDAS Baturusa Cerucuk |
| Mancang | DAS120663 | 856 | Bangka Strait | Bangka | BPDAS Baturusa Cerucuk |
| Kepoh | DAS120628 | 574 | Java Sea | Bangka | BPDAS Baturusa Cerucuk |
| Wae Bebek | DAS610437 | 393 | Ceram Sea | Buru | BPDAS Waehapu Batu Merah |
| Wae Nibe | DAS610443 | 440 | Ceram Sea | Buru | BPDAS Waehapu Batu Merah |
| Wae Apu | DAS610456 | 2203 | Banda Sea | Buru | BPDAS Waehapu Batu Merah |
| Wae Pede | DAS610478 | 462 | Banda Sea | Buru | BPDAS Waehapu Batu Merah |
| Wae Mala | DAS610492 | 774 | Banda Sea | Buru | BPDAS Waehapu Batu Merah |
| Wae Dalan | DAS610500 | 536 | Banda Sea | Buru | BPDAS Waehapu Batu Merah |
| Reo | DAS420815 | 1081 | Flores Sea | Flores | BPDAS Benain Noelmina |
| Aesesa 2 | DAS410829 | 1181 | Flores Sea | Flores | BPDAS Benain Noelmina |
| Nae | DAS410803 | 341 | Flores Sea | Flores | BPDAS Benain Noelmina |
| Rea | DAS410836 | 413 | Flores Sea | Flores | BPDAS Benain Noelmina |
| Buntal | DAS420824 | 439 | Flores Sea | Flores | BPDAS Benain Noelmina |
| Dondo | DAS410840 | 268 | Flores Sea | Flores | BPDAS Benain Noelmina |
| Nangagete Nebe | DAS410881 | 238 | Flores Sea | Flores | BPDAS Benain Noelmina |
| Jamal | DAS421108 | 860 | Savu Sea | Flores | BPDAS Benain Noelmina |
| Mokel | DAS421068 | 706 | Savu Sea | Flores | BPDAS Benain Noelmina |
| Ria Wajo | DAS421001 | 224 | Savu Sea | Flores | BPDAS Benain Noelmina |
| Ake Tiabo | DAS620038 | 668 | | Halmahera | BPDAS Ake Malamo |
| Ake Mawea | DAS610045 | 468 | | Halmahera | BPDAS Ake Malamo |
| Kao | DAS620050 | 1100 | | Halmahera | BPDAS Ake Malamo |
| Air Tutuli | DAS610070 | 395 | | Halmahera | BPDAS Ake Malamo |
| Ake Lamo Haltim | DAS610081 | 868 | | Halmahera | BPDAS Ake Malamo |
| Onat | DAS610086 | 554 | | Halmahera | BPDAS Ake Malamo |
| Ake Sangaji | DAS620094 | 877 | | Halmahera | BPDAS Ake Malamo |
| Ake Kobe | DAS620117 | 815 | | Halmahera | BPDAS Ake Malamo |
| Ake Tayawi | DAS610191 | 447 | | Halmahera | BPDAS Ake Malamo |
| Ake Lamo | DAS620211 | 670 | | Halmahera | BPDAS Ake Malamo |
| Baru | DAS220424 | 730 | Indian Ocean | Jawa | BPDAS Brantas Sampean |
| Bondoyodo | DAS220447 | 1320 | Indian Ocean | Jawa | BPDAS Brantas Sampean |
| Bedadung | DAS220444 | 1283 | Indian Ocean | Jawa | BPDAS Brantas Sampean |
| Sampean | DAS220287 | 1247 | Madura Strait | Jawa | BPDAS Brantas Sampean |
| Mayang | DAS220443 | 1113 | Indian Ocean | Jawa | BPDAS Brantas Sampean |
| Brantas | DAS220228 | 11973 | Madura Strait | Jawa | BPDAS Brantas Sampean |
| Cimanuk | DAS220071 | 3646 | Java Sea | Jawa | BPDAS Cimanuk Citanduy |
| Cisanggarung | DAS230092 | 881 | Java Sea | Jawa | BPDAS Cimanuk Citanduy |
| Citanduy | DAS230634 | 4651 | Indian Ocean | Jawa | BPDAS Cimanuk Citanduy |
| Ciwulan | DAS220658 | 1157 | Indian Ocean | Jawa | BPDAS Cimanuk Citanduy |
| Cilayu | DAS220694 | 466 | Indian Ocean | Jawa | BPDAS Cimanuk Citanduy |
| Cimedang | DAS220657 | 656 | Indian Ocean | Jawa | BPDAS Cimanuk Citanduy |
| Cilaki | DAS220710 | 422 | Indian Ocean | Jawa | BPDAS Cimanuk Citanduy |
| Cidanau | DAS220019 | 226 | Sunda Strait | Jawa | BPDAS Citarum Ciliwung |
| Ciujung | DAS230033 | 2159 | Java Sea | Jawa | BPDAS Citarum Ciliwung |
| Cidurian | DAS230034 | 849 | Java Sea | Jawa | BPDAS Citarum Ciliwung |
| Cimanceuri | DAS230036 | 498 | Java Sea | Jawa | BPDAS Citarum Ciliwung |
| Cisadane | DAS230039 | 1522 | Java Sea | Jawa | BPDAS Citarum Ciliwung |
| Ciliwung | DAS230042 | 388 | Java Sea | Jawa | BPDAS Citarum Ciliwung |
| Bekasi | DAS220046 | 1414 | Java Sea | Jawa | BPDAS Citarum Ciliwung |
| Citarum | DAS220047 | 6929 | Java Sea | Jawa | BPDAS Citarum Ciliwung |
| Ciasem | DAS210055 | 746 | Java Sea | Jawa | BPDAS Citarum Ciliwung |
| Cipunagara | DAS220058 | 1363 | Java Sea | Jawa | BPDAS Citarum Ciliwung |
| Cibuni | DAS220718 | 1439 | Indian Ocean | Jawa | BPDAS Citarum Ciliwung |
| Cikaso | DAS210719 | 906 | Indian Ocean | Jawa | BPDAS Citarum Ciliwung |
| Cimandiri | DAS220724 | 1840 | Indian Ocean | Jawa | BPDAS Citarum Ciliwung |
| Pemali | DAS220100 | 1274 | Java Sea | Jawa | BPDAS Pemali Jratun |
| Comal | DAS220113 | 825 | Java Sea | Jawa | BPDAS Pemali Jratun |
| Bodri | DAS220134 | 656 | Java Sea | Jawa | BPDAS Pemali Jratun |
| Tuntang | DAS220142 | 1307 | Java Sea | Jawa | BPDAS Pemali Jratun |
| Serang | DAS230143 | 4032 | Java Sea | Jawa | BPDAS Pemali Jratun |
| Juwana | DAS220178 | 1311 | Java Sea | Jawa | BPDAS Pemali Jratun |
| Serayu | DAS220351 | 3671 | Indian Ocean | Jawa | BPDAS Serayu Opak Progo |
| Progo | DAS230622 | 2474 | Indian Ocean | Jawa | BPDAS Serayu Opak Progo |
| Opak - Oyo | DAS230621 | 1412 | Indian Ocean | Jawa | BPDAS Serayu Opak Progo |
| Bengawan Solo | DAS230217 | 16017 | Java Sea | Jawa | BPDAS Solo |
| Barito | DAS330363 | 62585 | Java Sea | Kalimantan | BPDAS Barito |
| Seruyan | DAS320381 | 13329 | Java Sea | Kalimantan | BPDAS Kahayan |
| Kahayan | DAS320365 | 15441 | Java Sea | Kalimantan | BPDAS Kahayan |
| Katingan | DAS320369 | 19559 | Java Sea | Kalimantan | BPDAS Kahayan |
| Mentaya | DAS320370 | 14745 | Java Sea | Kalimantan | BPDAS Kahayan |
| Jelai | DAS330424 | 7105 | Java Sea | Kalimantan | BPDAS Kahayan |
| Kotawaringin | DAS330413 | 14163 | Java Sea | Kalimantan | BPDAS Kahayan |
| Kapuas | DAS320470 | 100636 | South China Sea | Kalimantan | BPDAS Kapuas |
| Sambas | DAS320510 | 7479 | South China Sea | Kalimantan | BPDAS Kapuas |
| Pawan | DAS310454 | 11508 | South China Sea | Kalimantan | BPDAS Kapuas |
| Sebuku | DAS310001 | 4708 | Celebes Sea | Kalimantan | BPDAS Mahakam Berau |
| Sembakung | DAS310002 | 5427 | Celebes Sea | Kalimantan | BPDAS Mahakam Berau |
| Sesayap | DAS320020 | 16089 | Celebes Sea | Kalimantan | BPDAS Mahakam Berau |
| Kayan | DAS320024 | 33166 | Celebes Sea | Kalimantan | BPDAS Mahakam Berau |
| Berau | DAS320058 | 16993 | Celebes Sea | Kalimantan | BPDAS Mahakam Berau |
| Mahakam | DAS330236 | 78532 | Makassar Strait | Kalimantan | BPDAS Mahakam Berau |
| Kali Belimbing | DAS410287 | 195 | Alas Strait | Lombok | BPDAS Dodokan Moyosari |
| Kali Mangkung | DAS420243 | 565 | Lombok Strait | Lombok | BPDAS Dodokan Moyosari |
| Kali Perempung | DAS420299 | 217 | Awang Bay | Lombok | BPDAS Dodokan Moyosari |
| Kali Segara | DAS410261 | 139 | Bali Sea | Lombok | BPDAS Dodokan Moyosari |
| Kokok Babak | DAS420244 | 300 | Lombok Strait | Lombok | BPDAS Dodokan Moyosari |
| Kokok Jangkok | DAS420246 | 207 | Lombok Strait | Lombok | BPDAS Dodokan Moyosari |
| Kokok Meninting | DAS420247 | 110 | Lombok Strait | Lombok | BPDAS Dodokan Moyosari |
| Kokok Sordang | DAS410286 | 201 | Alas Strait | Lombok | BPDAS Dodokan Moyosari |
| Kokok Songger | DAS410285 | 330 | Alas Strait | Lombok | BPDAS Dodokan Moyosari |
| Lokok Beburung | DAS410275 | 139 | Bali Sea | Lombok | BPDAS Dodokan Moyosari |
| Pejagan | DAS210908 | 314 | Madura Strait | Madura | BPDAS Brantas Sampean |
| Blega | DAS220886 | 639 | Madura Strait | Madura | BPDAS Brantas Sampean |
| Kemuningan | DAS210882 | 357 | Madura Strait | Madura | BPDAS Brantas Sampean |
| Samiajo | DAS220868 | 252 | Madura Strait | Madura | BPDAS Brantas Sampean |
| Saroka | DAS220844 | 304 | Madura Strait | Madura | BPDAS Brantas Sampean |
| Marengan | DAS210843 | 144 | Java Sea | Madura | BPDAS Brantas Sampean |
| Kalatek | DAS210842 | 115 | Java Sea | Madura | BPDAS Brantas Sampean |
| Tambangan | DAS210742 | 164 | Madura Strait | Madura | BPDAS Brantas Sampean |
| Sowu | DAS110930 | 202 | Indian Ocean | Nias | BPDAS Asahan Barumun |
| Eho | DAS110947 | 255 | Indian Ocean | Nias | BPDAS Asahan Barumun |
| Muzoi | DAS110927 | 780 | Indian Ocean | Nias | BPDAS Asahan Barumun |
| Susua | DAS110942 | 252 | Indian Ocean | Nias | BPDAS Asahan Barumun |
| Tulumbahu | DAS120937 | 138 | Indian Ocean | Nias | BPDAS Asahan Barumun |
| Mola | DAS120939 | 167 | Indian Ocean | Nias | BPDAS Asahan Barumun |
| Oyo | DAS120952 | 552 | Indian Ocean | Nias | BPDAS Asahan Barumun |
| Apauwar | DAS710066 | 2737 | Pacific Ocean | Papua | BPDAS Memberamo |
| Mamberamo | DAS740064 | 78155 | Pacific Ocean | Papua | BPDAS Memberamo |
| Ruwai | DAS710061 | 2955 | Pacific Ocean | Papua | BPDAS Memberamo |
| Einlanden/Baliem | DAS720104 | 37031 | Arafura Sea | Papua | BPDAS Memberamo |
| Digul | DAS740098 | 29340 | Arafura Sea | Papua | BPDAS Memberamo |
| Odamun | DAS720099 | 10377 | Arafura Sea | Papua | BPDAS Memberamo |
| Bian | DAS720091 | 9549 | Arafura Sea | Papua | BPDAS Memberamo |
| Kumbe | DAS710090 | 4687 | Arafura Sea | Papua | BPDAS Memberamo |
| Merauke | DAS740089 | 6086 | Arafura Sea | Papua | BPDAS Memberamo |
| Lorentz | DAS720106 | 8602 | Arafura Sea | Papua | BPDAS Memberamo |
| Peter | DAS720107 | 4496 | Arafura Sea | Papua | BPDAS Memberamo |
| Bunga | DAS720108 | 2171 | Arafura Sea | Papua | BPDAS Memberamo |
| Cemara | DAS720109 | 3580 | Arafura Sea | Papua | BPDAS Memberamo |
| Aikimiugah | DAS720110 | 1964 | Arafura Sea | Papua | BPDAS Memberamo |
| Otokwa | DAS720111 | 3179 | Arafura Sea | Papua | BPDAS Memberamo |
| Mukumuga | DAS720113 | 2644 | Arafura Sea | Papua | BPDAS Memberamo |
| Kamura | DAS720114 | 2681 | Arafura Sea | Papua | BPDAS Memberamo |
| Mimika | DAS720115 | 2519 | Arafura Sea | Papua | BPDAS Memberamo |
| Murpurka | DAS720117 | 4742 | Arafura Sea | Papua | BPDAS Memberamo |
| Siriwo | DAS720046 | 4577 | Cenderawasih Bay | Papua | BPDAS Memberamo |
| Wapoga | DAS720048 | 5913 | Cenderawasih Bay | Papua | BPDAS Memberamo |
| Warenai | DAS720047 | 4382 | | Papua | BPDAS Memberamo |
| Aramasa | DAS720140 | 2770 | Bintuni Bay | Papua | BPDAS Remu Ransiki |
| Kais | DAS720151 | 2944 | | Papua | BPDAS Remu Ransiki |
| Kamundan | DAS720147 | 5887 | Berau Gulf | Papua | BPDAS Remu Ransiki |
| Karabra | DAS720158 | 4405 | Ceram Sea | Papua | BPDAS Remu Ransiki |
| Omba | DAS720124 | 6670 | Arafura Sea | Papua | BPDAS Remu Ransiki |
| Sebyar | DAS720145 | 6516 | Berau Gulf | Papua | BPDAS Remu Ransiki |
| Wariagar | DAS720146 | 3889 | Berau Gulf | Papua | BPDAS Remu Ransiki |
| Wae Tabo | DAS610567 | 1180 | Ceram Sea | Seram | BPDAS Waehapu Batu Merah |
| Wae Tala | DAS620632 | 774 | Banda Sea | Seram | BPDAS Waehapu Batu Merah |
| Randangan | DAS510246 | 2575 | Gulf of Tomini | Sulawesi | BPDAS Bone Bolango |
| Paguyaman | DAS520214 | 2412 | Gulf of Tomini | Sulawesi | BPDAS Bone Bolango |
| Limboto Bone | DAS530187 | 2762 | Gulf of Tomini | Sulawesi | BPDAS Bone Bolango |
| Balease | DAS511118 | 1798 | Gulf of Bone | Sulawesi | BPDAS Jeneberang Saddang |
| Bila Walanae | DAS521170 | 7343 | Gulf of Bone | Sulawesi | BPDAS Jeneberang Saddang |
| Rongkong | DAS511120 | 1732 | Gulf of Bone | Sulawesi | BPDAS Jeneberang Walanae |
| Saddang | DAS531314 | 6639 | Makassar Strait | Sulawesi | BPDAS Jeneberang Walanae |
| Kalaena | DAS531109 | 1543 | Gulf of Bone | Sulawesi | BPDAS Jeneberang Walanae |
| Pangkeru | DAS531106 | 4946 | Gulf of Bone | Sulawesi | BPDAS Jeneberang Walanae |
| Budong-budong | DAS521416 | 2131 | Makassar Strait | Sulawesi | BPDAS Karama |
| Karama | DAS531411 | 5545 | Makassar Strait | Sulawesi | BPDAS Karama |
| Lumu | DAS511412 | 987 | Makassar Strait | Sulawesi | BPDAS Karama |
| Mapili | DAS521324 | 1797 | Makassar Strait | Sulawesi | BPDAS Karama |
| Bongka | DAS510459 | 3325 | Gulf of Tomini | Sulawesi | BPDAS Palu Poso |
| Lariang | DAS531440 | 7148 | Makassar Strait | Sulawesi | BPDAS Palu Poso |
| Palu | DAS521485 | 3079 | Palu Bay | Sulawesi | BPDAS Palu Poso |
| Poso | DAS530409 | 2673 | Gulf of Tomini | Sulawesi | BPDAS Palu Poso |
| Laa | DAS530749 | 3221 | Banda Sea | Sulawesi | BPDAS Palu Poso |
| Tambalako | DAS530750 | 1871 | Banda Sea | Sulawesi | BPDAS Palu Poso |
| Maraja | DAS521660 | 1434 | Celebes Sea | Sulawesi | BPDAS Palu Poso |
| Buol | DAS521728 | 1587 | Celebes Sea | Sulawesi | BPDAS Palu Poso |
| Lasolo | DAS530870 | 6002 | Banda Sea | Sulawesi | BPDAS Sampara |
| Konaweha | DAS520890 | 7013 | Banda Sea | Sulawesi | BPDAS Sampara |
| Roraya | DAS520982 | 1456 | Tiworo Strait | Sulawesi | BPDAS Sampara |
| Sangkub | DAS511825 | 1323 | Celebes Sea | Sulawesi | BPDAS Tondano |
| Dumoga Mongondow | DAS511841 | 2056 | Celebes Sea | Sulawesi | BPDAS Tondano |
| Ranoyapo | DAS511879 | 774 | Celebes Sea | Sulawesi | BPDAS Tondano |
| Tondano | DAS521913 | 542 | Celebes Sea | Sulawesi | BPDAS Tondano |
| Asahan Toba | DAS120049 | 7427 | Malacca Strait | Sumatra | BPDAS Asahan Barumun |
| Kualuh | DAS120050 | 4278 | Malacca Strait | Sumatra | BPDAS Asahan Barumun |
| Barumun Bila | DAS130051 | 13482 | Malacca Strait | Sumatra | BPDAS Asahan Barumun |
| Batang Toru | DAS120417 | 3312 | Indian Ocean | Sumatra | BPDAS Asahan Barumun |
| Batang Gadis | DAS120414 | 4860 | Indian Ocean | Sumatra | BPDAS Asahan Barumun |
| Batanghari | DAS130074 | 44879 | South China Sea | Sumatra | BPDAS Batanghari |
| Siak | DAS120065 | 11214 | Malacca Strait | Sumatra | BPDAS Indragiri Rokan |
| Rokan | DAS130053 | 20189 | Malacca Strait | Sumatra | BPDAS Indragiri Rokan |
| Kampar | DAS130067 | 25671 | South China Sea | Sumatra | BPDAS Indragiri Rokan |
| Indragiri | DAS130070 | 22758 | South China Sea | Sumatra | BPDAS Indragiri Rokan |
| Krueng Aceh | DAS120001 | 1985 | Andaman Sea | Sumatra | BPDAS Krueng Aceh |
| Peusangan | DAS120020 | 2567 | Malacca Strait | Sumatra | BPDAS Krueng Aceh |
| Jambo Aye | DAS120025 | 4640 | Malacca Strait | Sumatra | BPDAS Krueng Aceh |
| Manyak Payed Tamiang | DAS130029 | 5648 | Malacca Strait | Sumatra | BPDAS Krueng Aceh |
| Kluet | DAS120432 | 3014 | Indian Ocean | Sumatra | BPDAS Krueng Aceh |
| Tripa | DAS120438 | 3124 | Indian Ocean | Sumatra | BPDAS Krueng Aceh |
| Woyla | DAS120444 | 2570 | Indian Ocean | Sumatra | BPDAS Krueng Aceh |
| Teunom | DAS120445 | 2556 | Indian Ocean | Sumatra | BPDAS Krueng Aceh |
| Musi | DAS130077 | 77964 | South China Sea | Sumatra | BPDAS Musi |
| Riding | DAS110085 | 4308 | Java Sea | Sumatra | BPDAS Musi |
| Wampu | DAS120034 | 4178 | Malacca Strait | Sumatra | BPDAS Wampu Sei Ular |
| Singkil | DAS130428 | 13588 | Indian Ocean | Sumatra | BPDAS Wampu Sei Ular |
| Mesuji | DAS130087 | 7275 | Java Sea | Sumatra | BPDAS Way Seputih Way Sekampung |
| Tulang Bawang | DAS130088 | 9849 | Java Sea | Sumatra | BPDAS Way Seputih Way Sekampung |
| Seputih | DAS120089 | 7553 | Java Sea | Sumatra | BPDAS Way Seputih Way Sekampung |
| Sekampung | DAS120100 | 4848 | Java Sea | Sumatra | BPDAS Way Seputih Way Sekampung |
| Kambaneru | DAS411722 | 1408 | Savu Sea | Sumba | BPDAS Benain Noelmina |
| Beh | DAS420577 | 1545 | Indian Ocean | Sumbawa | BPDAS Dodokan Moyosari |
| Jangka | DAS410468 | 138 | Savu Sea | Sumbawa | BPDAS Dodokan Moyosari |
| Kambu | DAS420411 | 274 | Flores Sea | Sumbawa | BPDAS Dodokan Moyosari |
| Labebela | DAS420451 | 117 | | Sumbawa | BPDAS Dodokan Moyosari |
| Nae | DAS410469 | 158 | | Sumbawa | BPDAS Dodokan Moyosari |
| Moyo | DAS410339 | 794 | Flores Sea | Sumbawa | BPDAS Dodokan Moyosari |
| Padolo | DAS420446 | 260 | Savu Sea | Sumbawa | BPDAS Dodokan Moyosari |
| Pelaparado | DAS420444 | 866 | Gulf of Bima | Sumbawa | BPDAS Dodokan Moyosari |
| Rea | DAS420318 | 834 | Alas Strait | Sumbawa | BPDAS Dodokan Moyosari |
| Rhee | DAS410332 | 214 | Flores Sea | Sumbawa | BPDAS Dodokan Moyosari |
| Tula | DAS410408 | 202 | Flores Sea | Sumbawa | BPDAS Dodokan Moyosari |
| Utan | DAS410329 | 192 | Flores Sea | Sumbawa | BPDAS Dodokan Moyosari |
| Sumbawa | DAS410338 | 281 | Flores Sea | Sumbawa | BPDAS Dodokan Moyosari |
| Benain | DAS421503 | 3499 | Indian Ocean | Timor | BPDAS Benain Noelmina |
| Noelmina | DAS421527 | 1981 | Indian Ocean | Timor | BPDAS Benain Noelmina |

== See also ==
- Drainage basin
- Integrated catchment management
- River basin management plans
- List of rivers of Indonesia
