= Arafura Sea =

Marginal sea between Australia and Indonesian New Guinea

- Laut Arafura (Indonesian)
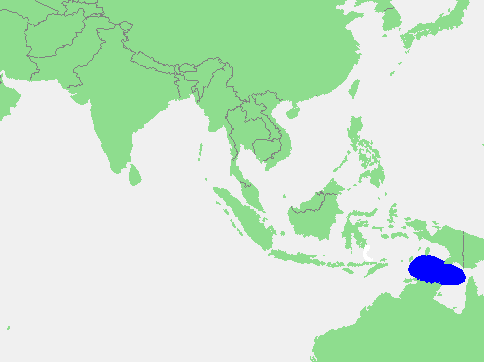
- Location

- Location within Indonesia

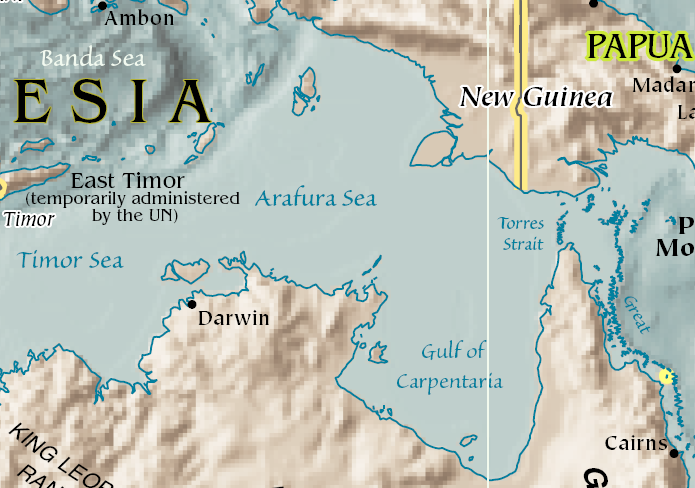
- Map
- Location: Western Pacific Ocean, Oceania
- Coordinates: 9°00′S 133°0′E
- Type: Sea
- Basin countries: Australia, Indonesia, and Papua New Guinea
- Max. length: 1,694 km (1,053 mi)
- Max. width: 605 km (376 mi)
- Surface area: 1,024,000 km^{2} (395,000 sq mi)
- Islands: Aru Islands, Croker Island, Goulburn Islands, Howard Island, Kei Islands, Tanimbar Islands

The Arafura Sea, also known as the Arafuru Sea, lies to the southeast of the Malay Archipelago in the western Pacific Ocean, overlying the continental shelf between Australia and Western New Guinea (also called Papua), which is the Indonesian part of the Island of New Guinea.

== Geography ==
The Arafura Sea is bordered by the northern coast of the Australia to the south, the Timor Sea to the west, the Banda and Seram seas to the northwest, and the Torres Strait to the east. Just across the strait, farther to the east, lies the Coral Sea. The Arafura Sea is 1,694 kilometres (1,053 mi) long and 605 kilometres (376 mi) wide. The depth of the sea is 50–80 m (160–260 ft) in most places, with the depth increasing to the west.

The sea lies over the Arafura Shelf, which is a section of the Sahul Shelf. When sea levels were low during the last glacial maximum, the Arafura Shelf, the Gulf of Carpentaria and the Torres Strait formed a large, flat, land bridge that connected Australia and New Guinea and eased the migration of humans from Asia into Australia. The combined landmass formed the continent of Sahul.

=== Extent ===
The International Hydrographic Organization (IHO) categorises the Arafura Sea as one of the bodies of water of the East Indian Archipelago. The IHO defines its limits as follows:

On the North. The Southeastern limit of the Ceram Sea [A line from Karoefa, New Guinea, to the Southeastern extreme of Adi Island, thence to Tg. Borang, the Northern point of Noehoe Tjoet [Kai Besar] (5°17′S 133°09′E)] and the Eastern limit of the Banda Sea [From Tg Borang, the Northern point of Noehoe Tjoet, through this island to its Southern point, thence a line to the Northeast point of Fordata, through this island and across to the Northeast point of Larat, Tanimbar Islands (7°06′S 131°55′E), down the East coast of Jamdena [Yamdena] Island to its Southern point, thence through Anggarmasa to the North point of Selaroe and through this island to Tg Aro Oesoe its Southern point (8°21′S 130°45′E)].

On the East. The Southwest coast of New Guinea from Karoefa (133°27'E) to the entrance to the Bensbak River (141°01'E), and thence a line to the Northwest extreme of York Peninsula, Australia (11°05′S 142°03′E).

On the South. By the North coast of Australia from the Northwest extreme of York Peninsula to Cape Don (11°19′S 131°46′E).

On the West. A line from Cape Don to Tanjong Aro Oesoe, the Southern point of Selaroe (Tanimbar Islands).

== Etymology ==
European use of the name "Arafura Sea" dates back to at least 1663, when Joan Blaeu recorded in the text on his wall map of the East Indies ("Archipelagus Orientalis, sive Asiaticus") that the inland inhabitants of the Moluccas call themselves "Alfores".

The name also appeared in George Windsor Earl's 1837 Sailing Directions for the Arafura Sea, which he compiled from the narratives of Lieutenants Kolff and Modera of the Royal Netherlands Navy.

Although it has been suggested that Arafura derives from the Portuguese word "Alfours", meaning "free men", it seems more likely that sea is named after the Harrafora, the indigenous name for "the people of mountains" in the Moluccas (part of Indonesia), which was the explanation recorded by Lieutenants Kolff and Modera in the 1830s.

Thomas Forrest sailed through the Moluccas (Maluku Islands) in 1775, and documented that there were people who called themselves the "Harafora" living in the western end of New Guinea, in subordination to the "Papuas". He also reported their presence in Magindano (Mindanao). The geographer Conrad Malte-Brun repeated Forrest's reports of a race of "Haraforas" in 1804, and added Borneo to the list of places this group inhabited. The ethnologist James C. Prichard described the Haraforas as head-hunters. John Coulter, in his account of a sojourn in the interior of south-west New Guinea in 1835, referred to the tribespeople there as the "Horrafora", and had the impression that Papuans and Horraforans were two distinct groups in New Guinea.

AJ van der Aa's 1939 Toponymic Dictionary, recently rediscovered in the Dutch National Archives, has this explanation for the name of the sea: "The inhabitants of the Moluccas called themselves 'haraforas', which translates to 'anak-anak gunung', meaning 'children of the mountains'."

== Fisheries ==
The Arafura Sea is a rich fishery resource, particularly for shrimp and demersal fish. Economically important species include barramundi, grouper, Penaeid shrimp, and Nemipteridae fishes.

At a time when many marine ecosystems and fish stocks around the world are diminished or collapsing, the Arafura Sea stands out as among the richest marine fisheries on Earth. However, the natural resources of the Arafura have been under increased pressure from illegal, unreported and unregulated fishing activities.

The Arafura and Timor Seas Expert Forum (ATSEF) was established in 2002 to promote the economically and environmentally sustainable management of those seas.

== See also ==
- Alfur people
- Aru Islands
- Asmat people
- Makassan contact with Australia
