= List of rivers of South Sulawesi =

Mouth location of main rivers of South Sulawesi

List of rivers flowing in the province of South Sulawesi, island of Sulawesi, Indonesia.

== In alphabetical order ==
- Jeneberang River
- Kalaena River
- Pangkajene River
- Sadang River
  - Mamasa River
- Walanae River

== See also ==
- Drainage basins of Sulawesi
- List of drainage basins of Indonesia
- List of rivers of Indonesia
- List of rivers of Sulawesi
