= List of rivers of Central Sulawesi =

Rivers of Central Sulawesi

List of rivers flowing in the province of Central Sulawesi, island of Sulawesi, Indonesia.

== In alphabetical order ==
- Bongka River
- Laa River
- Lariang River
- Palu River
- Poso River

== See also ==
- Drainage basins of Sulawesi
- List of drainage basins of Indonesia
- List of rivers of Indonesia
- List of rivers of Sulawesi
