= 2019 South Sulawesi floods =

Natural disaster in Indonesia

- South Sulawesi province shaded red on a map of Indonesia
- Date: 22 January 2019
- Deaths: 68
- Injuries: 47
- Missing: 6

On 22 January 2019, floods caused by heavy rainfall struck the Indonesian province of South Sulawesi. At least 68 people were killed and thousands were displaced. Gowa Regency was particularly hard-hit, experiencing the majority of the fatalities.

The most destructive flood was caused by the overflowing of the Jeneberang River and the opening of the watergates of the Bili-Bili Dam in Gowa, though other floods also occurred elsewhere in the province.

== Background ==
The province of South Sulawesi experiences flooding annually. Due to development of a low-pressure area in the Timor Sea coupled with increased humidity in the wet season, the rainfall levels in the area increased significantly, with the Meteorology, Climatology, and Geophysical Agency issuing an extreme weather warning between 21 and 26 January 2019. One of the dams in the province, the Bili-Bili Dam which lies on the Jeneberang River, has suffered from silting, coupled with the critical condition of the river's catchment area due to agricultural use.

== Flooding ==
The heavy rainfalls caused the Jeneberang River to overflow, resulting in the overfilling of the Gowa Regency's Bili-Bili Dam and forcing the water gates to be opened. The water level in parts of Makassar reached roof level in excess of 1.5 metres (4.9 ft). Other rivers in the province, such as the Walanae River also overflowed, causing further damage in other locations.

By 25 January, the flooding had not receded fully, with some residents of Makassar still displaced.

== Casualties ==
68 people were reported killed as of 25 January 2019, in addition to 6 missing. Most of the confirmed deaths were recorded in Gowa Regency, which suffered 45 dead. Some of the deaths were due to electrocution, while others were caused by the landslides.

== Impact ==
The flooding directly impacted 10 regencies or cities, with 3,321 people being evacuated from 78 villages according to the Indonesian National Board for Disaster Management (BNPB). 5,825 people were recorded to be "impacted" by the flood, and 32 houses were confirmed to be swept away, with 25 further houses heavily damaged, 14 damaged, and 5 buried under landslides. 2,694 houses, 11,433 hectares (28,250 acres) of farmland were inundated, alongside damage to various public facilities. The Indonesian Police reported 7,364 people in evacuation sites in Makassar, Gowa and Jeneponto.

An official noted that the flooding was "the worst in a decade". The Trans-Sulawesi Highway was impacted, being cut off for 20 hours. Floodwater damaged pumps in Maros, disrupting the distribution of freshwater. South Sulawesi governor Nurdin Abdullah estimated that the financial damages in Jeneponto Regency alone will be in excess of Rp 100 billion (USD 7 million).

== Response ==
The Governor of South Sulawesi Nurdin Abdullah declared an emergency response period which was to last until 29 January 2019. Search and Rescue teams from various organizations - BNPB, Indonesian Police, TNI, various ministries and volunteer groups - were deployed to search for and evacuate survivors. A helicopter from the Indonesian Air Force was deployed to deliver aid to an isolated settlement in Gowa.

== Aftermath ==
South Sulawesi governor Nurdin Abdullah blamed environmental damages due to illegal mining in Gowa Regency for causing the floods.
