= Katangka Mosque =

Mosque in Gowa, South Sulawesi, Indonesia

Coordinates: 5°11′26″S 119°27′05″E

Masjid Tua Al-Hilal Katangka Al-Hilal Old Mosque of Katangka
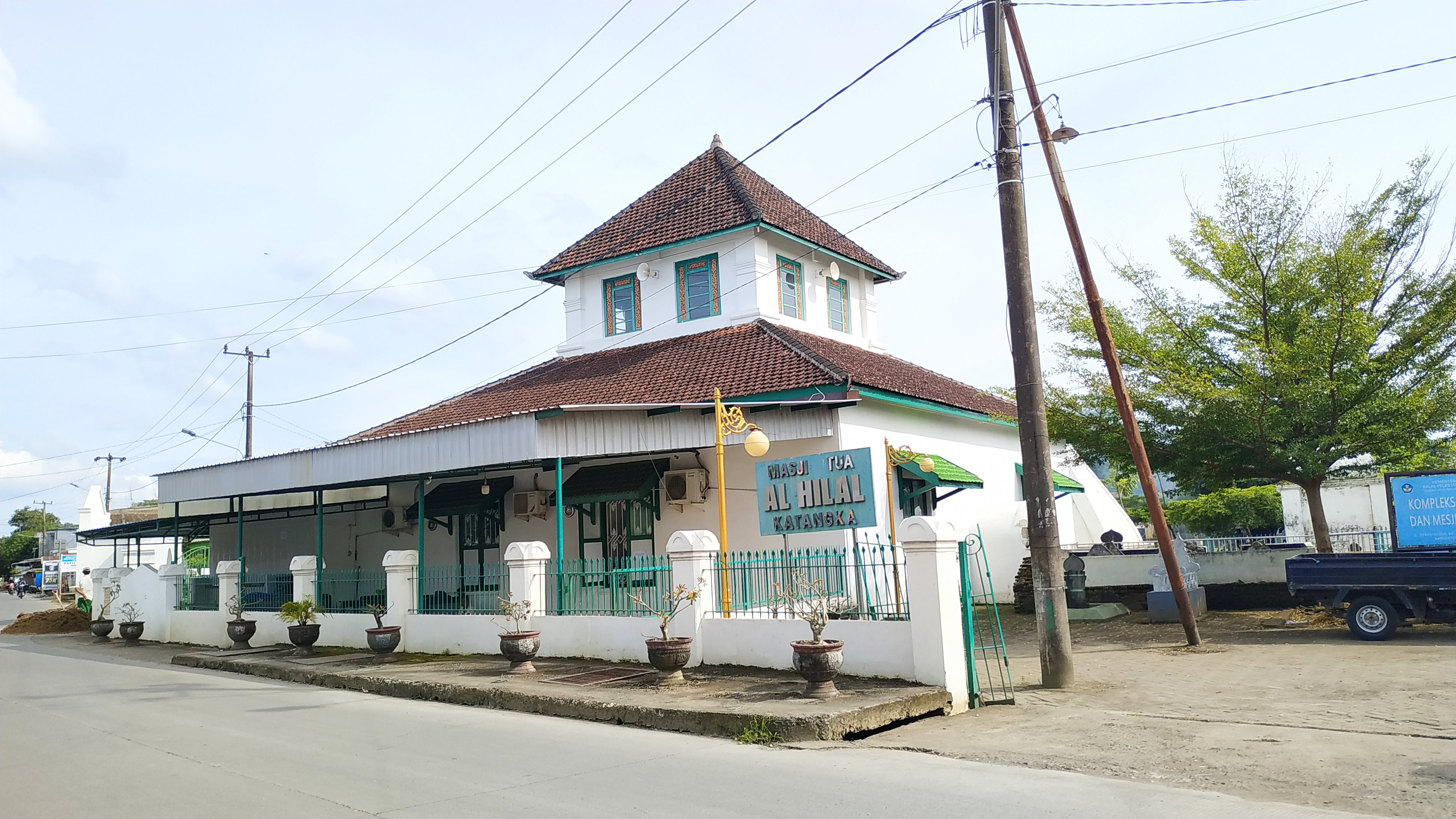

Religion
- Affiliation: Islam
- Branch/tradition: Sunni

Location
- Location: Katangka, Somba Opu, Gowa, South Sulawesi, Indonesia
- Interactive map of Masjid Tua Al-Hilal Katangka; Al-Hilal Old Mosque of Katangka

Architecture
- Type: Mosque
- Style: Javanese Islamic architectural style
- Groundbreaking: 1603

Specifications
- Dome: 0
- Minaret: 0

Al-Hilal Mosque or Al Hilal Old Mosque of Katangka, better known as Katangka Mosque, is a historical mosque in South Sulawesi, Indonesia. Constructed in 1603 by the first Muslim ruler of the Sultanate of Gowa, Sultan Alauddin, the mosque is considered the oldest mosque in South Sulawesi.

== Description ==
Flag of the Sultanate of Gowa

Katangka Mosque was built in 1603 by Sultan Alauddin, the 14th king of the Sultanate of Gowa who first converted to Islam. Initially, it was inside the fort complex and used as a place for worship by the king and his guards. Historically, during the Friday prayer, the imams who delivered sermon were guarded by two bodyguards who carried swords. The mimbar of the mosque is surrounded by three-edged spears up until today. Aside from a place of worship, the mosque building was used as a fortification during times of war. This can be seen from the solid walls of the mosque which reach a thickness of 120 centimeters.

Katangka Mosque was the center of Islamic proliferation in South Sulawesi, namely in the territory of the Sultanate of Gowa and the Kingdom of Tallo. There are tombs of political and religious leaders near the mosque, namely Sultan Hasanuddin and Sheikh Yusuf al-Makassari. Sheikh Yusuf, before traveled to Banten and Aceh and finally being exiled to South Africa, was raised by Sultan Alauddin in the vicinity of Katangka Mosque. In addition, three Minangkabau scholars who propagated Islam in South Sulawesi are inscribed in the mosque; Datuk ri Tiro, Datuk Ribandang, and Datuk Patimang.

Architecturally, it is influenced by the Javanese Islamic style of Demak Mosque, built by the Sultanate of Demak which was the center of Islamic proliferation in the era. This can be seen from the shape of the roof of Katangka Mosque. Although the mosque has been renovated seven times, 80% of the original structure remains intact. Some interior elements of the mosque, including mimbar, mihrab, and windows are also preserved in their original form.
