= Mamasa =

Mamasa may refer to:

- Mamasa language
- Mamasa Regency
- Mamasa River

== See also ==
- Polewali-Mamasa, a former Indonesian Regency
- Toraja Mamasa Church
