= Somba Opu, Gowa =

Somba Opu
- District
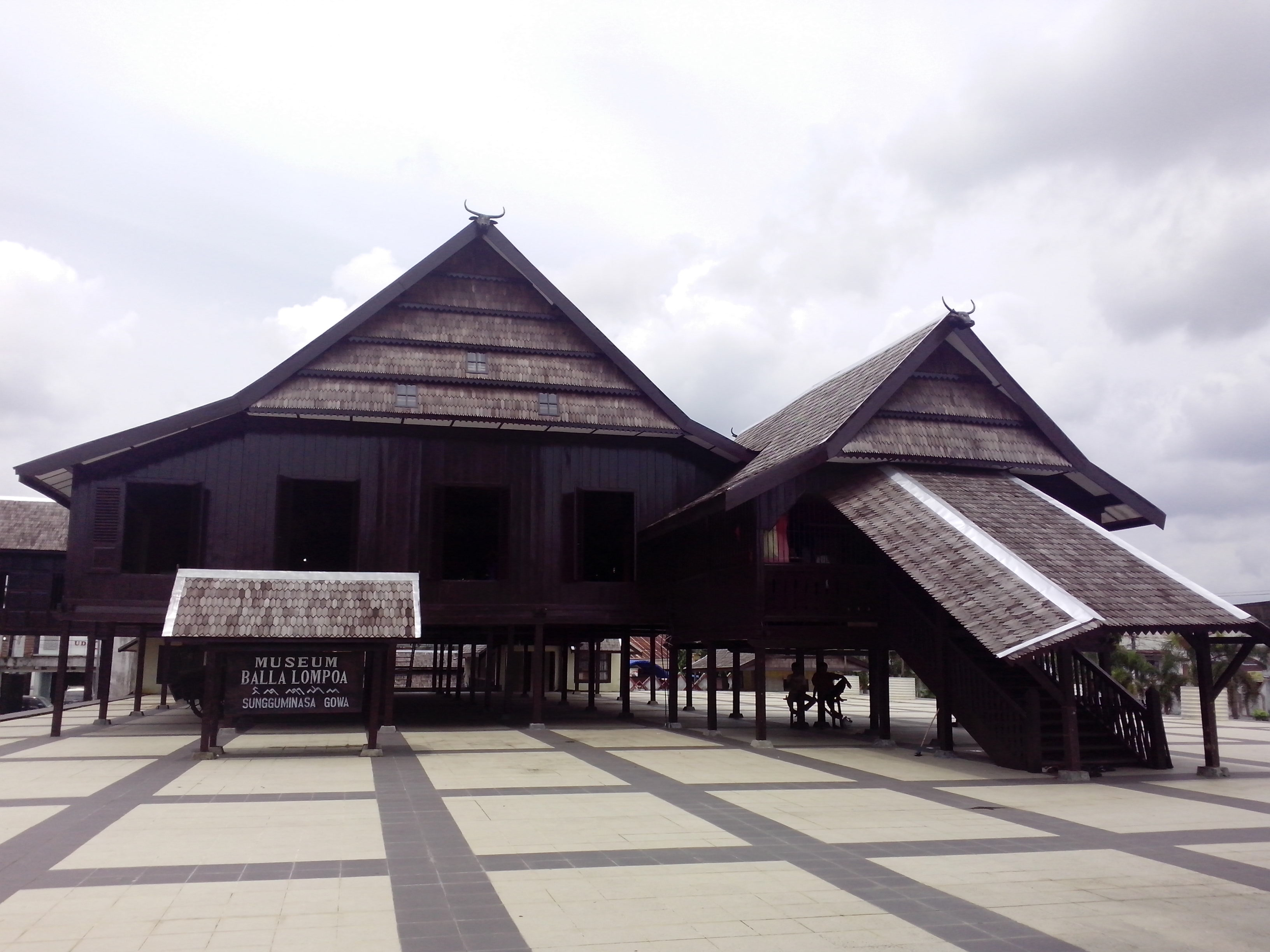
- Balla' lompoa museum

- Location of Somba Opu District
- Coordinates: 5°12′5″S 119°27′15″E
- Country: Indonesia
- Province: South Sulawesi
- Regency: Gowa Regency

Government
  - Camat: Drs. Abdullah Siradjuddin, MSi

Area
  - Total: 28.09 km^{2} (10.85 sq mi)

Population (mid 2022 estimate)
  - Total: 160,023
  - Density: 5,697/km^{2} (14,750/sq mi)
- Time zone: UTC+8 (Indonesia Central Time)
- Postal Code: 9211x
- Area code: (+62) 411

Somba Opu is a district (kecamatan) located in the Gowa Regency, South Sulawesi, Indonesia, and is part of the Greater Makassar area. Somba Opu is one of 18 districts in Gowa Regency. The administrative capital of Gowa Regency, "Sungguminasa", is located in this district and this is the largest regency capital or 2nd largest town in South Sulawesi. A suburb to Makassar, the district is a relatively urbanized area, and can also be called as the city's bedroom community.

Although Somba Opu is not considered as an official town or city, it has a high population density of 5,697 people per km^{2}, and a population of 160,023 in mid 2022, all packed into an area of about 28.09 square kilometres.

== Geography ==
The total area is 28.09 km^{2} or 2,809 Ha (1.49% of the total area of Gowa Regency) with an altitude of 25 metres above sea level. Most of the area is located in the lowlands with geographic coordinates at 5°12'5"S 119°27'15"E. The natural border with the neighbouring district of Pallangga is the Jeneberang River which is a river with a length of 90 km and a river basin area of 881 km^{2}.

=== Main Sights ===
- Balla Lompoa Museum is a reconstruction of the royal palace of Gowa, which was established during the reign of the 31st King of Gowa, I Mangngi-mangngi Daeng Matutu, in 1936. In Makassar, Balla Lompoa means a large house or the House of greatness. The architecture of this museum building is in the form of a typical Bugis house, a stilt house, with a ladder more than two meters high to enter the patio space. The entire building is made of ironwood or iron wood. This building is in a one hectare complex that is bordered by a high wall fence. This museum serves as a place to store collections of Gowa Kingdom objects. The historical objects are displayed based on the general function of each room in the museum building. At the front of the main building, a map of the Kingdom of Gowa is displayed on the right side of the wall. In the main room the family tree of the Gowa Kingdom starts from the King Gowa I, Tomanurunga in the 13th century, until the last Gowa King Sultan Moch Abdulkadir Aididdin A. Idjo Karaeng Lalongan (1947-1957). Note: Other sources call it Andi Ijo Daeng Mattawang Karaeng Lalolang Sultan Muhammad Abdul Kadir Aididdin.
- Al-Hilal Mosque or better known as Katangka Mosque is one of the oldest mosques in the province of South Sulawesi, Indonesia. Named Katangka Mosque because it is located in the village of Katangka, Somba Opu District, Gowa Regency. In addition, the mosque is called Katangka, because the basic raw materials of the mosque are believed to be taken from the Katangka tree.

== Education ==
- Alauddin Islamic State University
- Patria Artha University

== Villages ==
Somba Opu is divided into 14 villages

Postalcode	Villages	Area (km^{2})	Population mid 2021	Neighborhood
92111	Sungguminasa	1.46	7,705	1. Sungguminasa; 2. Lambaselo
92111	Bonto-bontoa	1.61	13,607	1. Bonto-bontoa; 2. Bontokamase
92112	Tompobalang	1.80	12,175	1. Cambaya; 2. Jeneberang
92112	Tamarunang	2.16	16,915	1. Paggentungan; 2. Beroanging
92113	Paccinongang	3.71	24,335	1. Pao-Pao; 2. Paccinongang
92113	Samata	1.44	9,441	1. Samata; 2. Borongraukang
92114	Katangka	1.36	9,599	1. Lakiyung; 2. Katangka
92114	Tombolo	2.06	16,098	1. Pa'bangngiang; 2. Tombolo
92115	Pandang-Pandang	2.16	7,264	1. Pandang-Pandang; 2. Mangasa
92116	Kalegowa	1.21	2,840	1. Tamalate; 2. Hasanuddin
92117	Batangkaluku	1.30	14,361	1. Karettapa; 2. Batangkaluku
92118	Romangpolong	2.71	9,299	1. Romangpolong; 2. Garaganti
92119	Bontoramba	2.12	4,683	1. Bontobaddo; 2. Galoggoro
92119	Mawang	2.99	5,123	1. Buttadidi; 2. Biringbalang
