= Marisa River =

Coordinates: 0.4451°N 121.9368°E

Marisa River Sungai Marisa, Dutula Marisa, Salo Marisa, Salo Milangotaloehoe
- Location of river mouth Marisa River (Indonesia)

Location
- Country: Indonesia

Physical characteristics
- Source
  - location: Gorontalo

Marisa River is a river in the province of Gorontalo, island of Sulawesi, Indonesia, about 1800 km northeast of the capital Jakarta.

== Geography ==
The river flows in the northern area of Sulawesi island with predominantly tropical rainforest climate (designated as Af in the Köppen-Geiger climate classification). The annual average temperature in the area is 23 °C. The warmest month is October, when the average temperature is around 26 °C, and the coldest is February, at 21 °C. The average annual rainfall is 2133 mm. The wettest month is July, with an average of 270 mm rainfall, and the driest is September, with 53 mm rainfall.

== See also ==
- List of drainage basins of Indonesia
- List of rivers of Indonesia
- List of rivers of Sulawesi
