= Lasolo River =

Coordinates: 3.5515°S 122.271°E

Lasolo River Sungai Lasolo, Aalaa Solo, Sungai Solo,
- Location of river mouth Lasolo River (Indonesia)

Location
- Country: Indonesia

Physical characteristics
- Source
  - location: Southeast Sulawesi
- Length: 277 km (172 mi)
- Basin size: 5,918.5 km^{2} (2,285.1 mi^{2})
- Discharge
  - location: Near mouth
  - average: 151.3 m^{3}/s (5,340 cu ft/s)

Lasolo River is a river in Southeast Sulawesi province, Sulawesi island, Indonesia, about 1700 km northeast of the capital Jakarta. Tributaries include the Lalindu River.

== Geography ==
The river flows in the southeast area of Sulawesi with predominantly tropical monsoon climate (designated as Am in the Köppen-Geiger climate classification). The annual average temperature in the area is 25 °C. The warmest month is October, when the average temperature is around 28 °C, and the coldest is June, at 24 °C. The average annual rainfall is 2495 mm. The wettest month is July, with an average of 337 mm rainfall, and the driest is September, with 28 mm rainfall.

== See also ==
- List of drainage basins of Indonesia
- List of rivers of Indonesia
- List of rivers of Sulawesi
