= Sungguminasa =

Village in Gowa, South Sulawesi Province, Indonesia

Coordinates: 5°12′S 119°27′E

Sungguminasa ᨔᨘᨁᨘᨆᨗᨊᨔ
- Village (kelurahan)
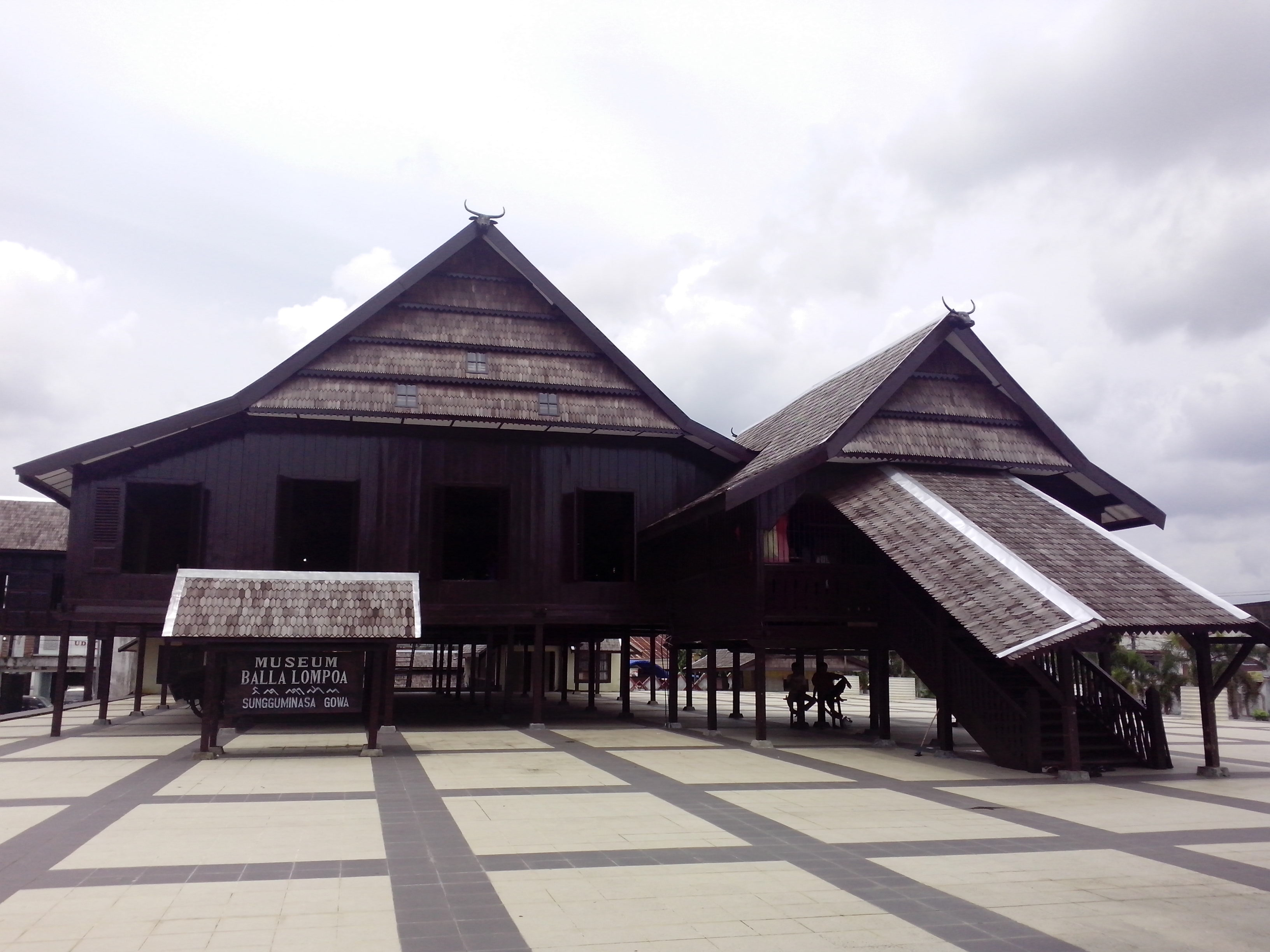
- Balla' Lompoa Museum
- Interactive map of Sungguminasa
- Country: Indonesia
- Province: South Sulawesi
- Regency: Gowa
- District: Somba Opu

Area
  - Total: 0.85 km^{2} (0.33 sq mi)

Population (2021)
  - Total: 7,733
  - Density: 9,100/km^{2} (24,000/sq mi)
- Postal code: 92111

Sungguminasa is a town and Gowa Regency's administrative capital in South Sulawesi Province, Indonesia. It is home to the Balla' Lompoa Museum, a reconstruction of the Gowa royal palace. The building is constructed on stilts and made of ironwood.

== Climate ==
Sungguminasa has a tropical monsoon climate (Am) with moderate to little rainfall from May to October and heavy to very heavy rainfall from November to April.

Climate data for Sungguminasa
Month	Jan	Feb	Mar	Apr	May	Jun	Jul	Aug	Sep	Oct	Nov	Dec	Year
Mean daily maximum °C (°F)	29.2 (84.6)	29.4 (84.9)	29.9 (85.8)	30.7 (87.3)	31.0 (87.8)	30.6 (87.1)	30.7 (87.3)	31.2 (88.2)	31.5 (88.7)	31.5 (88.7)	30.7 (87.3)	29.4 (84.9)	30.5 (86.9)
Daily mean °C (°F)	26.0 (78.8)	26.3 (79.3)	26.4 (79.5)	26.8 (80.2)	26.9 (80.4)	26.2 (79.2)	25.8 (78.4)	25.8 (78.4)	26.2 (79.2)	26.6 (79.9)	26.7 (80.1)	26.1 (79.0)	26.3 (79.4)
Mean daily minimum °C (°F)	22.9 (73.2)	23.3 (73.9)	22.9 (73.2)	22.9 (73.2)	22.8 (73.0)	21.8 (71.2)	20.9 (69.6)	20.4 (68.7)	20.9 (69.6)	21.8 (71.2)	22.8 (73.0)	22.9 (73.2)	22.2 (71.9)
Average rainfall mm (inches)	606 (23.9)	553 (21.8)	379 (14.9)	177 (7.0)	105 (4.1)	70 (2.8)	44 (1.7)	23 (0.9)	36 (1.4)	66 (2.6)	220 (8.7)	493 (19.4)	2,772 (109.2)
Source: Climate-Data.org
