= Watansoppeng =

- Town
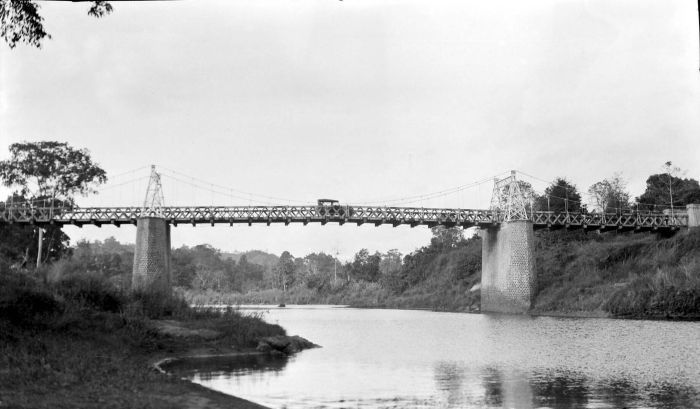
- Bridge over the Walanae River near Watansoppeng in the 1920s

- Location within Sulawesi
- Coordinates: 4°20′55″S 119°52′57″E
- Country: Indonesia
- Province: South Sulawesi
- Regency: Soppeng Regency
- Time zone: UTC+8 (+8)

Watansoppeng ([watansɔpːɛŋ]) is a town in South Sulawesi province of Indonesia and the capital of Soppeng Regency. It is situated in southern central South Sulawesi, on the western side of the Walanae River, about 100 kilometres (62 mi) by air northwest of the port of Makassar.

The town is known as "Bat City" or "Gotham City" to Indonesians due to its extensive bat population. Watansoppeng is a producer of silk.

== History ==
Human civilisation in Soppeng is one of the oldest in Indonesia. Prehistoric stone artifacts have been found along the banks of the Walanae River. Two groups emerged in the area, Soppeng Riaja (West) and Soppeng Rilau (East), and the peoples were referred to as "sianre bale" in the Bugis language, which translates as "eating each other like fish".

Under King Latemmamala, the Soppeng Kingdom was established in 1261. In around 1609, Watansoppeng became Islamic, and the local Bugis peoples adopted their architecture, clothing, and marriage and funeral traditions. Soppeng was controlled by the Dutch from 1905, and today the Yuliana Villa and halfway house are a testament to their time in the area.

Charley Boorman visited Watansoppeng in 2009 as part of By Any Means 2.

== Geography ==
Watansoppeng is situated in southern central South Sulawesi in the southwest of Sulawesi, on the western side of the Walanae River. It is about 100 kilometres (62 mi) by air northwest of the port of Makassar, and about 19.5 kilometres (12.1 mi) by air southwest of Lake Tempe. The mountains to the west of the town are heavily forested.

=== Subdivisions ===
The area is divided administratively into five kelurahans (village subdistricts):

- Bila
- Lalabata Rilau
- Botto
- Lapajung
- Lemba

== Landmarks and culture ==
The main mosque in the town centre is the Masjid Agung Darussalem. The stadium in the town is the Stadion Haji Andi Wana.

The town is known as "Bat City" or "Gotham City" to Indonesians due to its large population of bats. Every night, "the sight of hundreds of black flying foxes hanging from every bough of a tree is common-place". The town is a producer of silk.

== See also ==
- List of regencies and cities of Indonesia
