= List of rivers of Sulawesi =

Mouth location of main rivers of Sulawesi

List of rivers flowing in the island of Sulawesi, Indonesia.

== In alphabetical order ==
- Bongka River
- Jeneberang River
- Kalaena River
- Karama River
- Laa River
- Lariang River
- Lasolo River
  - Lalindu River
- Manado River
- Marisa River
- Paguyaman River
- Palu River
- Pangkajene River
- Poso River
- Sadang River
  - Mamasa River
- Sampara River
- Walanae River

== By province ==
=== Central Sulawesi ===
- Bongka River
- Laa River
- Lariang River
- Palu River
- Poso River

=== Gorontalo ===
- Marisa River
- Paguyaman River

=== North Sulawesi ===
- Bone River
- Manado River
- Naha River
- Poigar River
- Ranoyapo River
- Tondano River

=== South Sulawesi ===
- Jeneberang River
- Kalaena River
- Pangkajene River
- Sadang River
  - Mamasa River
- Walanae River

=== Southeast Sulawesi ===
- Lalindu River
- Lasolo River
- Sampara River

=== West Sulawesi ===
- Karama River
- Lariang River
- Mandar River
- Mapilli River

== See also ==
- Drainage basins of Sulawesi
- List of drainage basins of Indonesia
- List of rivers of Indonesia
- Geography of Sulawesi
- Geography of Indonesia
