= Lalindu River =

Coordinates: 3.4713°S 122.0954°E

Lalindu River Sungai Lalindu, Aalaa Lindu, Lindu Sungai, Soengai Lalindoe, Salo Lindoe, La Lindoe
- Location of river mouth Lalindu River (Indonesia)

Location
- Country: Indonesia

Physical characteristics
- Source
  - location: Southeast Sulawesi

The Lalindu River is a river in Southeast Sulawesi province, Sulawesi island, Indonesia, about 1700 km northeast of the capital Jakarta. It is a tributary of the Lasolo River.

== Geography ==
The river flows in the southeast area of Sulawesi with predominantly tropical monsoon climate (designated as Am in the Köppen-Geiger climate classification). The annual average temperature in the area is 22 °C. The warmest month is October, when the average temperature is around 24 °C, and the coldest is July, at 20 °C. The average annual rainfall is 2495 mm. The wettest month is July, with an average of 337 mm rainfall, and the driest is September, with 28 mm rainfall.

Aalaa Lindu

Climate chart (precipitation, max. and min. temperature)
J	F	M	A	M	J	J	A	S	O	N	D
246 24 22	225 23 21	253 24 21	283 24 18	327 23 19	324 24 20	337 22 19	61 23 19	28 26 20	46 27 21	113 25 21	253 24 19
- █ Average max. and min. temperatures in °C
- █ Precipitation totals in mm
Imperial conversion
J	F	M	A	M	J	J	A	S	O	N	D
9.7 75 72	8.9 73 70	10 75 70	11 75 64	13 73 66	13 75 68	13 72 66	2.4 73 66	1.1 79 68	1.8 81 70	4.4 77 70	10 75 66
- █ Average max. and min. temperatures in °F
- █ Precipitation totals in inches

== See also ==
- List of drainage basins of Indonesia
- List of rivers of Indonesia
- List of rivers of Sulawesi
