= Bili-Bili Dam =

Indonesian dam

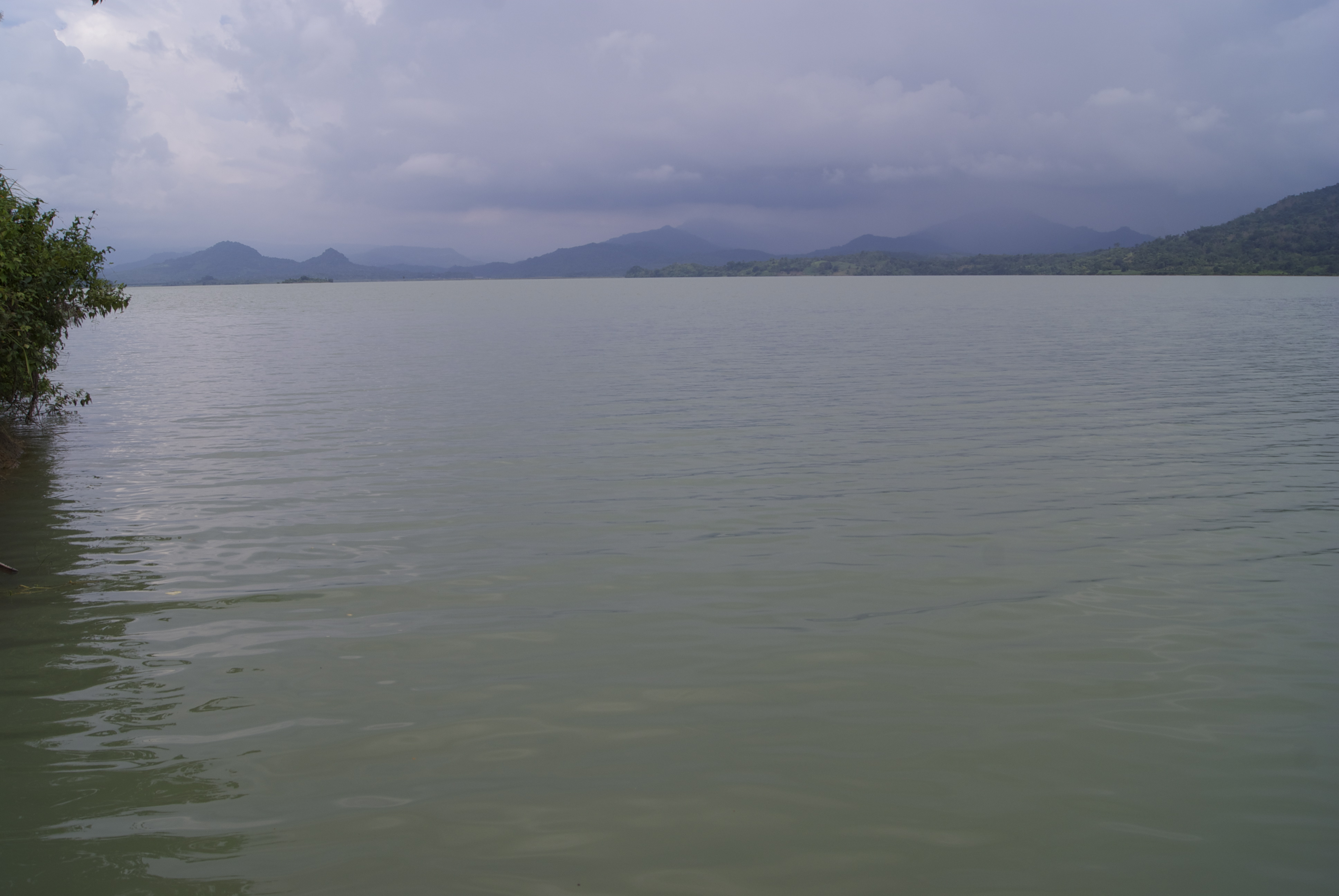
- Bili-Bili Reservoir, South Sulawesi

- Location within Sulawesi Location within Indonesia
- Country: Indonesia
- Location: Makassar, Gowa Regency, South Sulawesi, Indonesia
- Coordinates: 5°16′35.70″S 119°34′50.09″E
- Purpose: Irrigation, power, flood control
- Status: Operational
- Construction began: 1991
- Opening date: 1998; 28 years ago

Dam and spillways
- Type of dam: Embankment, rock-fill
- Impounds: Jeneberang River
- Height: 73 m (240 ft)
- Length: 1,800 m (5,900 ft)

Reservoir
- Total capacity: 375,000,000 m^{3} (304,000 acre⋅ft)

Power Station
- Commission date: 2005
- Type: Conventional
- Turbines: 1 x 12.75 MW; 1 x 6.5 MW
- Installed capacity: 19.25 MW
- Annual generation: 69,000 MWh

The Bili-Bili Dam is a dam located in Gowa Regency, South Sulawesi, Indonesia, on the Jeneberang River, about 30 km from the city of Makassar. It provides flood control, irrigation, and hydroelectric power generation. The dam was constructed between 1991 and 1998.

== Background ==
In 1981, Bili-Bili Dam was added to the Jeneberang River Comprehensive Development Project. Construction began in 1991 and the dam was completed in 1998. The weirs downstream of the dam and their accompanying irrigation canals were completed in December 2005. The dam's power station was commissioned in 2005 as well. The project was built with funding and cooperation from the Japan International Cooperation Agency. It has several purposes to include municipal water supply for the city of Makassar, about 30 km away, and to protect the city from historic flooding. It is designed prevent an estimated 50-year flood. Water from its reservoir also helps irrigate about 23,786 ha (58,780 acres) of rice fields in Gowa and Takalar regencies. The power station has an installed capacity of 19.25 MW and generates about 69,000 MWh of electric power each year.

Sedimentation in the reservoir has been a concern since at least 2004. The dam is downstream from Mount Bawakaraeng, which is "prone to landslides." A large landslide in 2004 prompted a request for survey assistance to the Japanese government to determine the possible impact on the dam.

An overflow of the dam in 2019 caused a major flooding.

== Design ==
The Bili-Bili Dam is a 1,800 m (5,900 ft) long and 73 m (240 ft) tall rock-fill type. Its reservoir holds 375,000,000 m^{3} (304,000 acre⋅ft) of water. Below the dam are three weirs, the Bili-Bili, Bissau and Kampili. They connect to 61.2 km (38.0 mi) of primary canals and 228.1 km (141.7 mi) of secondary canals. The Bili-Bili weir covers about 2,444 ha (6,040 acres) of farmland while the Bissau covers 10,795 ha (26,680 acres) and Kampili 10,547 ha (26,060 acres).
