= Laa River =

Coordinates: 2°01′41″S 121°28′56″E

Laa River Sungai Laa, Salo Laa, Sungai La, Salo La
- Location of river mouth Laa River (Indonesia)

Location
- Country: Indonesia
- Province: Central Sulawesi

Physical characteristics
- Length: 96.3 km (59.8 mi)
- Basin size: 2,875.6 km^{2} (1,110.3 mi^{2})
- Discharge
  - location: Near mouth
  - average: 166.5 m^{3}/s (5,880 cu ft/s)

Basin features
- River system: Laa River

The Laa River is a river in Sulawesi, Indonesia, about 1700 km northeast of the capital Jakarta.

== Hydrology ==
The Laa River empties into the Gulf of Mori. The Ta Pamona live along the river as well as the To Mori, who settled on the lower section of the river.

== Geography ==
The river flows in the eastern area of Sulawesi which has a predominantly tropical rainforest climate (designated as Af in the Köppen-Geiger climate classification). The annual average temperature in the area is 23 °C. The warmest month is February, when the average temperature is around 26 °C, and the coldest is July, at 21 °C. The average annual rainfall is 4154 mm. The wettest month is April, with an average of 522 mm rainfall, and the driest is October, with 94 mm rainfall.

Laa River

Climate chart (precipitation, max. and min. temperature)
J	F	M	A	M	J	J	A	S	O	N	D
450 24 21	332 26 25	482 26 20	522 25 22	479 25 19	473 23 21	516 23 19	160 23 20	105 27 21	94 28 22	199 27 21	342 25 22
- █ Average max. and min. temperatures in °C
- █ Precipitation totals in mm
Imperial conversion
J	F	M	A	M	J	J	A	S	O	N	D
18 75 70	13 79 77	19 79 68	21 77 72	19 77 66	19 73 70	20 73 66	6.3 73 68	4.1 81 70	3.7 82 72	7.8 81 70	13 77 72
- █ Average max. and min. temperatures in °F
- █ Precipitation totals in inches

== See also ==
- List of drainage basins of Indonesia
- List of rivers of Indonesia
- List of rivers of Sulawesi
- Poso River
- Lake Poso
