= Kanreapia =

- Location in South Sulawesi and Indonesia Kanreapia (Indonesia)
- Coordinates: 5°16′55.7″S 119°56′16.8″E
- Country: Indonesia
- Province: South Sulawesi
- Regency: Gowa Regency
- District: Tombolo Pao District
- Elevation: 6,729 ft (2,051 m)

Population (2010)
  - Total: 4,304
- Time zone: UTC+8 (Indonesia Central Standard Time)

Kanreapia is a village in Tombolo Pao district, Gowa Regency in South Sulawesi province, Indonesia. Its population is 4304.

== Agriculture ==
The village is known for its production of passion fruits.

== Climate ==
Kanreapia has a subtropical highland climate (Cfb) with moderate rainfall from July to October and heavy to very heavy rainfall from November to June with extremely heavy rainfall in January.

Climate data for Kanreapia
Month	Jan	Feb	Mar	Apr	May	Jun	Jul	Aug	Sep	Oct	Nov	Dec	Year
Mean daily maximum °C (°F)	19.7 (67.5)	19.7 (67.5)	20.0 (68.0)	19.9 (67.8)	19.4 (66.9)	18.6 (65.5)	18.4 (65.1)	19.1 (66.4)	20.2 (68.4)	21.2 (70.2)	20.5 (68.9)	19.7 (67.5)	19.7 (67.5)
Daily mean °C (°F)	15.6 (60.1)	15.5 (59.9)	15.8 (60.4)	15.6 (60.1)	15.4 (59.7)	14.7 (58.5)	14.2 (57.6)	14.4 (57.9)	15.1 (59.2)	16.0 (60.8)	16.0 (60.8)	15.6 (60.1)	15.3 (59.6)
Mean daily minimum °C (°F)	11.5 (52.7)	11.4 (52.5)	11.6 (52.9)	11.4 (52.5)	11.5 (52.7)	10.9 (51.6)	10.1 (50.2)	9.8 (49.6)	10.1 (50.2)	10.8 (51.4)	11.5 (52.7)	11.5 (52.7)	11.0 (51.8)
Average rainfall mm (inches)	727 (28.6)	630 (24.8)	511 (20.1)	358 (14.1)	238 (9.4)	139 (5.5)	104 (4.1)	78 (3.1)	67 (2.6)	119 (4.7)	322 (12.7)	542 (21.3)	3,835 (151)
Source: Climate-Data.org
