= Soppeng Regency =

Regency in South Sulawesi, Indonesia

Coordinates: 4°20′55″S 119°52′57″E

Soppeng Regency Kabupaten Soppeng
- Regency
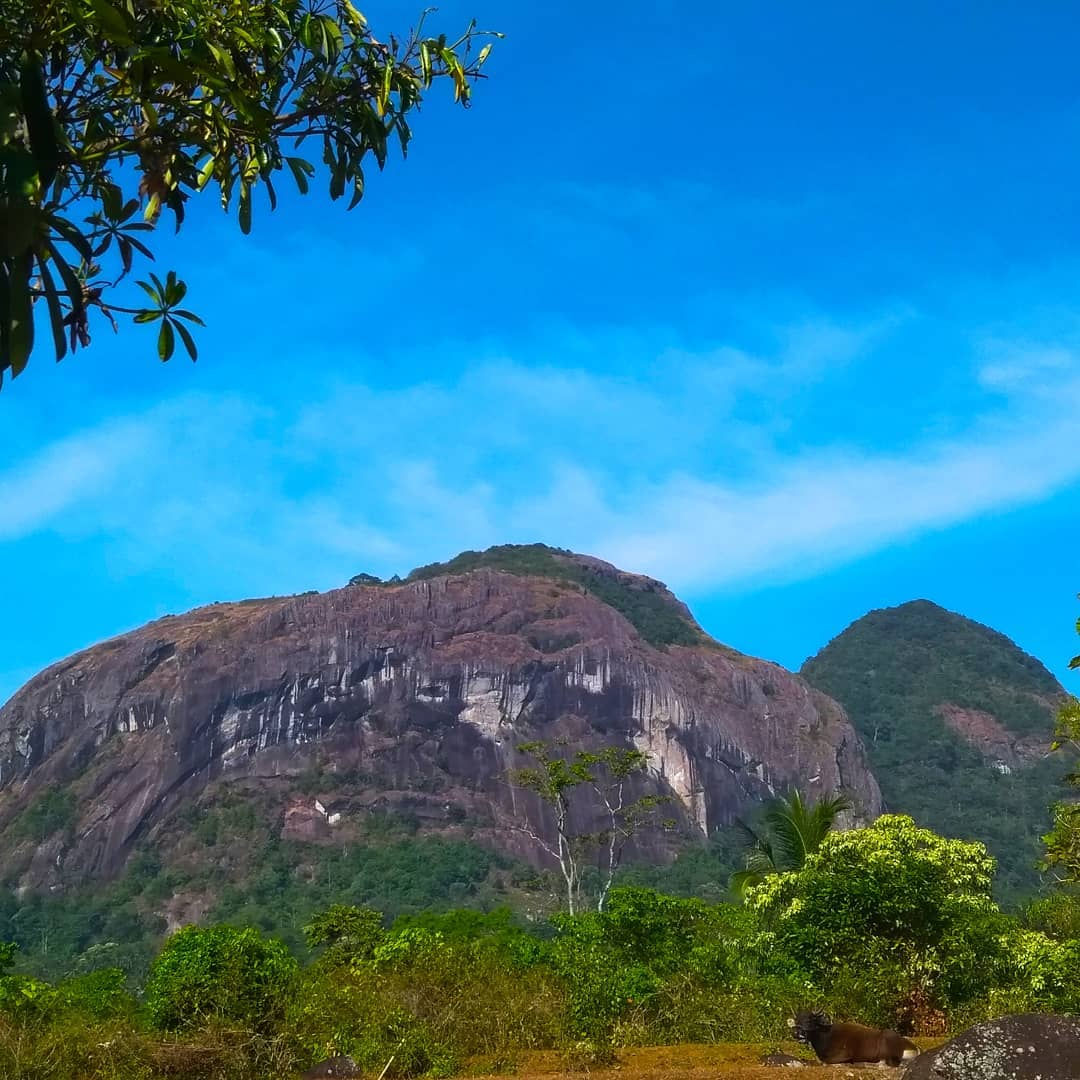
- Bulu Dua

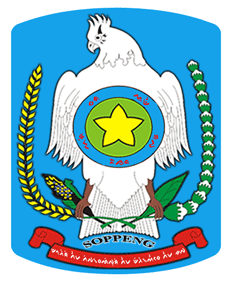
- Coat of arms

- Location within South Sulawesi
- Country: Indonesia
- Province: South Sulawesi
- Capital: Watansoppeng

Government
  - Regent: Suwardi Haseng
  - Vice Regent: Selle K.S. Dalle

Area
  - Total: 1,500 km^{2} (580 sq mi)

Population (mid 2025 estimate)
  - Total: 241,777
  - Density: 160/km^{2} (420/sq mi)
- Time zone: UTC+8 (ICST)
- Area code: (+62) 484

Soppeng Regency is a landlocked regency in South Sulawesi province of Indonesia. Soppeng Regency has its seat of government (capital) in the town of Watansoppeng, located 180 km from Makassar. The regency covers a land area of 1,500 km^{2}, and had a population of 223,826 at the 2010 Census and 235,167 at the 2020 Census. The official estimate of population as of mid 2025 was 241,777 (including 116,971 males and 124,806 females).

== History ==
The regency covers the area of the former Bugis Kingdom of Soppeng, of which Watansoppeng was the capital, set among rolling foothills on the western edge of the fertile Walanae Valley, which runs north to Lake Tempe.

== Administration ==
Soppeng Regency in 2025 (as in 2010) comprises eight administrative Districts (Kecamatan), tabulated below with their areas and their populations at the 2010 Census and the 2020 Census, together with the official estimates as at mid 2025. The table also includes the locations of the district administrative centres, and the number of administrative villages in each district (totaling 49 rural desa and 21 urban kelurahan), and its post code.

Kode Wilayah	Name of District (kecamatan)	Area in km^{2}	Pop'n Census 2010	Pop'n Census 2020	Pop'n Estimate mid 2025	Admin centre	No. of villages	Post code
73.12.01	Marioriwawo	300	44,310	48,200	49,596	Takalala	13 ^{(a)}	90862
73.12.04	Lalabata	278	44,269	48,663	50,256	Watansoppeng	10 ^{(b)}	90811: 90814
73.12.02	Liliriaja	96	26,964	28,107	28,910	Cangadi	8 ^{(c)}	90863
73.12.07	Ganra	57	11.301	11,447	11,659	Ganra	4	90860
73.12.08	Citta	40	7,999	8,046	8,214	Citta	4	90861
73.12.03	Lilirilau	187	38,202	37,802	39,036	Cabenge	12 ^{(d)}	90871
73.12.06	Donri Donri	222	22,920	23,887	24,732	Tajuncu	9	90853
73.12.05	Marioriawa	320	27,861	29,015	29,374	Batu-Batu	10 ^{(e)}	90852
	Totals	1,500	223,826	235,167	241,777	Watamsoppeng	70	

Notes:

- (a) comprising 2 kelurahan (Labessi and Tettikenrarae) and 11 desa.
- (b) comprising 7 kelurahan (Bila, Botto, Lalabata Rilau, Lapajung, Lemba, Ompo and Salokaraja) and 3 desa.
- (c) comprising 3 kelurahan (Appanang, Galung and Jennae) and 5 desa.
- (d) comprising 4 kelurahan (Cabenge, Macanre, Pajalesang and Ujung) and 8 desa.
- (e) comprising 5 kelurahan (Attang Salo, Batu-Batu, Kaca, Limpomajang and Manorang Salo) and 5 desa.

== See also ==
- List of regencies and cities of Indonesia
