= Lariang River =

Lariang River Sungai Lariang, Salu Lariang, Uwai Lariang
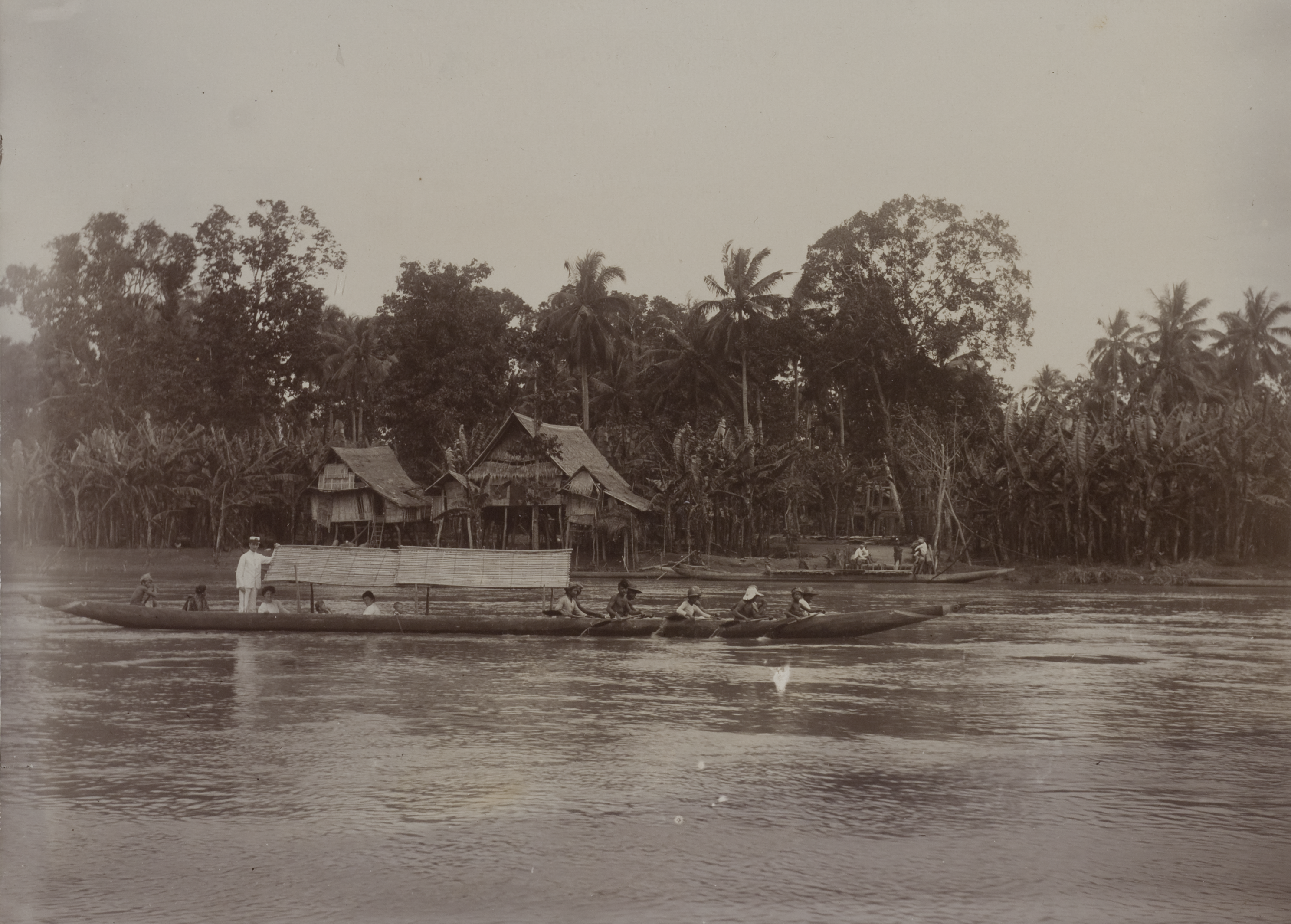
- Boat crossing the Lariang River, Donggala 1926
- Native name: Salo Lariang

Physical characteristics
- Source
  - location: Sulawesi
- Mouth: Macassar Strait
  - location: Lariang, West Sulawesi
  - coordinates: 1°25′00″S 119°17′31″E
  - elevation: 0 m (0 ft)
- Length: 245 km (152 mi)
- Basin size: 7,069 km^{2} (2,729 sq mi)
- Discharge
  - location: Near mouth
  - average: 224 m^{3}/s (7,900 cu ft/s)

Mouth of Lariang River

The Lariang River is a river in Sulawesi, Indonesia.

== Course ==
Its tributary, the Pebatua River, arises in Donggala Regency, Central Sulawesi, and forms the Lariang when it is joined by the Koro River from the left (south) at 1°39′50″S 120°2′47″E. The river, as the Lariang, goes on to form part of the border between Central Sulawesi and West Sulawesi and enters the Macassar Strait just past the town of Lariang. The mouth is at 1°25′00″S 119°17′31″E.

== See also ==
- List of drainage basins of Indonesia
- List of rivers of Indonesia
- List of rivers of Sulawesi
- Geography of Sulawesi
- Geography of Indonesia
