= Mamasa River =

Coordinates: 3.5078°S 119.7268°E

- Location of river mouth Mamasa River (Indonesia)

Location
- Country: Indonesia

Physical characteristics
- Source
  - location: South Sulawesi
- Mouth: = Sadang River

Mamasa River is a river in Sulawesi, Indonesia. It is a tributary of the Sadang River.

== Geography ==
The river flows in the southeast area of Sulawesi with predominantly tropical monsoon climate (designated as Am in the Köppen-Geiger climate classification). The annual average temperature in the area is 23 °C. The warmest month is October, when the average temperature is around 26 °C, and the coldest is June, at 24 °C. The average annual rainfall is 2500 mm. The wettest month is May, with an average of 387 mm rainfall, and the driest is September, with 68 mm rainfall.

Mamasa River

Climate chart (precipitation, max. and min. temperature)
J	F	M	A	M	J	J	A	S	O	N	D
206 25 19	163 26 20	249 26 20	357 24 20	387 25 20	204 25 21	243 24 19	86 27 19	68 28 20	86 30 21	211 28 21	240 25 20
- █ Average max. and min. temperatures in °C
- █ Precipitation totals in mm
Imperial conversion
J	F	M	A	M	J	J	A	S	O	N	D
8.1 77 66	6.4 79 68	9.8 79 68	14 75 68	15 77 68	8 77 70	9.6 75 66	3.4 81 66	2.7 82 68	3.4 86 70	8.3 82 70	9.4 77 68
- █ Average max. and min. temperatures in °F
- █ Precipitation totals in inches

== See also ==
- List of drainage basins of Indonesia
- List of rivers of Indonesia
- List of rivers of Sulawesi
