= Pangkajene River =

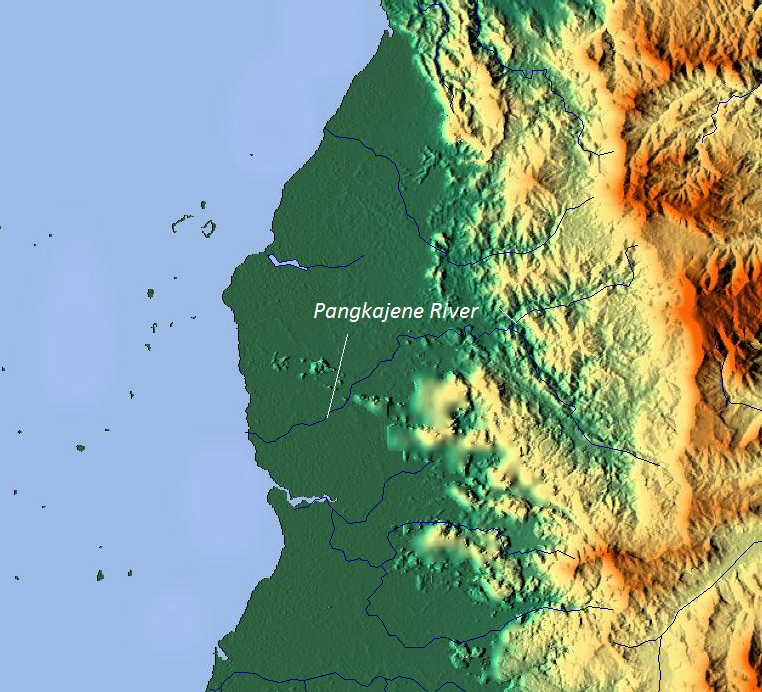
- Map of the river basin

- Location of river mouth in Sulawesi Location of river mouth in Indonesia
- Native name: Salo Pangkajene (Indonesian)

Location
- Country: Indonesia

Physical characteristics
- Source
  - location: Sulawesi
- Mouth: Polong River and Tangnga River
  - location: South Sulawesi
  - coordinates: 4°50′55″S 119°30′41″E

The Pangkajene is a river of south-western Sulawesi, north of Makassar, Indonesia, about 1400 km northeast of capital Jakarta.

== Hydrology ==
Pangkajene River flows into the Polong River and Tangnga River near the sea at 4°50′55″S 119°30′41″E, near the village of the same name. Upstream, the stretch of river is known as the Koraja River. The rock of the river is Jurassic Paremba Sandstone and contains many shallow marine sedimentary rocks and crystalline schists. The fossilized remains of plants have been discovered in the Pangkajene area.

== Geography ==
The river flows in the southwestern area of Sulawesi island with predominantly tropical rainforest climate (designated as Af in the Köppen-Geiger climate classification). The annual average temperature in the area is 25 °C. The warmest month is September, when the average temperature is around 28 °C, and the coldest is January, at 21 °C. The average annual rainfall is 2570 mm. The wettest month is January, with an average of 480 mm rainfall, and the driest is September, with 33 mm rainfall.

Salo Pangkajene

Climate chart (precipitation, max. and min. temperature)
| J | F | M | A | M | J | J | A | S | O | N | D |
| 480 23 19 | 207 24 24 | 261 25 23 | 272 26 25 | 273 26 24 | 243 28 24 | 196 27 22 | 46 30 23 | 33 32 24 | 66 31 25 | 161 28 24 | 331 25 24 |
- █ Average max. and min. temperatures in °C
- █ Precipitation totals in mm
Imperial conversion
| J | F | M | A | M | J | J | A | S | O | N | D |
| 19 73 66 | 8.1 75 75 | 10 77 73 | 11 79 77 | 11 79 75 | 9.6 82 75 | 7.7 81 72 | 1.8 86 73 | 1.3 90 75 | 2.6 88 77 | 6.3 82 75 | 13 77 75 |
- █ Average max. and min. temperatures in °F
- █ Precipitation totals in inches

== Gallery ==
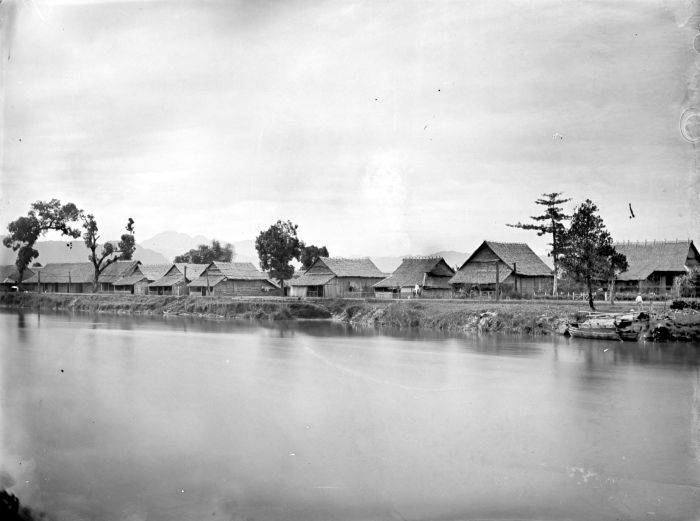
Camps along the Pangkajene River, Sulawesi

== See also ==
- List of drainage basins of Indonesia
- List of rivers of Indonesia
- List of rivers of Sulawesi
