= Poso River =

River in Sulawesi, Indonesia

Coordinates: 1.3887°S 120.7499°E

Poso River Sungai Poso, Koro Poso, Soengai Posso
- The Poso River, at Poso, May 1919.

- Location of river mouth Poso River (Indonesia)
- Native name: Sungai Poso (Indonesian)

Location
- Country: Indonesia
- State: Central Sulawesi

Physical characteristics
- Source: Lake Poso
  - location: Tentena
- Mouth: Gulf of Tomini
- Length: 100 km (62 mi)
- Basin size: 2,673.4 km^{2} (1,032.2 mi^{2})
- Discharge
  - location: Near mouth
  - average: 119.9 m^{3}/s (4,230 cu ft/s)

Basin features
- River system: Poso River

The Poso is a river of Central Sulawesi on Sulawesi island, Indonesia, about 1600 km northeast of the capital Jakarta. The Poso is approximately 100 km long and flows from Lake Poso, about 2 km west of the town of Tentena to the city of Poso and then into the Gulf of Tomini.

== Geography ==
The river flows in the central area of Sulawesi with predominantly tropical rainforest climate (designated as Af in the Köppen-Geiger climate classification). The annual average temperature in the area is 22 °C (72 °F). The warmest month is October, when the average temperature is around 23 °C (73 °F), and the coldest is January, at 20 °C (68 °F). The average annual rainfall is 2,715 millimeters (106.9 inches). The wettest month is December, with an average of 368-millimeter (14.5 in) rainfall, and the driest is September, with a 66-millimeter (2.6 in) rainfall.

Poso River

Climate chart (precipitation, max. and min. temperature)
J	F	M	A	M	J	J	A	S	O	N	D
268 22 19	159 24 20	240 24 18	356 24 18	368 25 20	229 23 20	262 24 19	149 25 20	66 26 19	152 26 20	257 24 20	211 23 20
- █ Average max. and min. temperatures in °C
- █ Precipitation totals in mm
Imperial conversion
J	F	M	A	M	J	J	A	S	O	N	D
11 72 66	6.3 75 68	9.4 75 64	14 75 64	14 77 68	9 73 68	10 75 66	5.9 77 68	2.6 79 66	6 79 68	10 75 68	8.3 73 68
- █ Average max. and min. temperatures in °F
- █ Precipitation totals in inches

== See also ==
- List of drainage basins of Indonesia
- List of rivers of Indonesia
- List of rivers of Sulawesi
