= Jeneberang River =

Coordinates: 5°11′35″S 119°22′53″E

Jeneberang River Sungai Jeneberang, Jene Berang, River Gowa, Djene Berang, Soengai Beerang
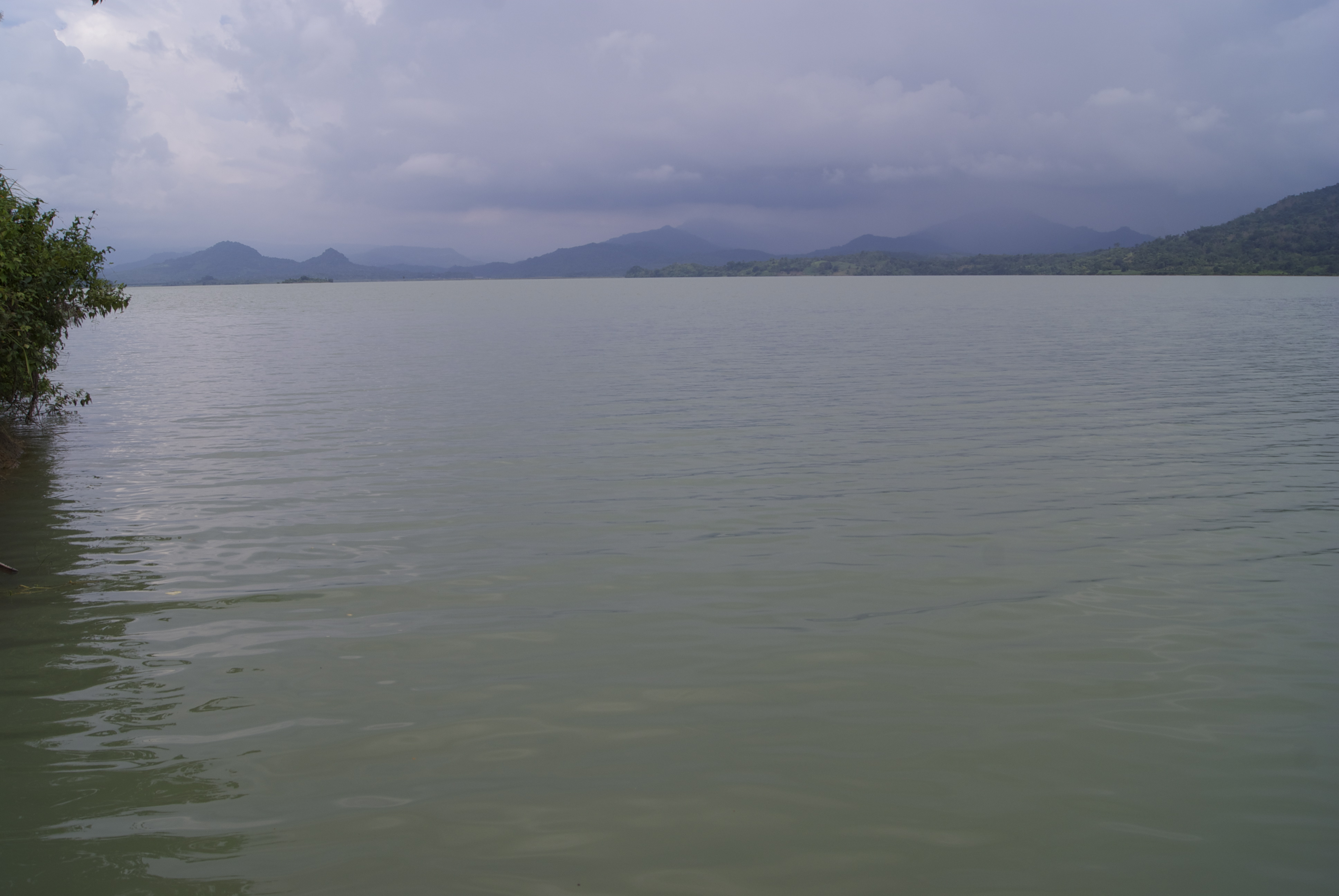

- Location of river mouth Jeneberang River (Indonesia)

Location
- Country: Indonesia
- State: South Sulawesi

Physical characteristics
- Source: Mount Bawakaraeng
  - elevation: 2.833 m (9 ft 3.5 in)
- Mouth: Makassar Strait
- Length: 80 km (50 mi)
- Basin size: 860 km^{2} (330 sq mi)

The Jeneberang (Indonesian: Sungai Jeneberang) (Historical Name : Garassi River) is a river of approximately 75 km in length in the south-western half of the island of Sulawesi, Indonesia. The catchment has an area of 760 square kilometers.

== Hydrology ==
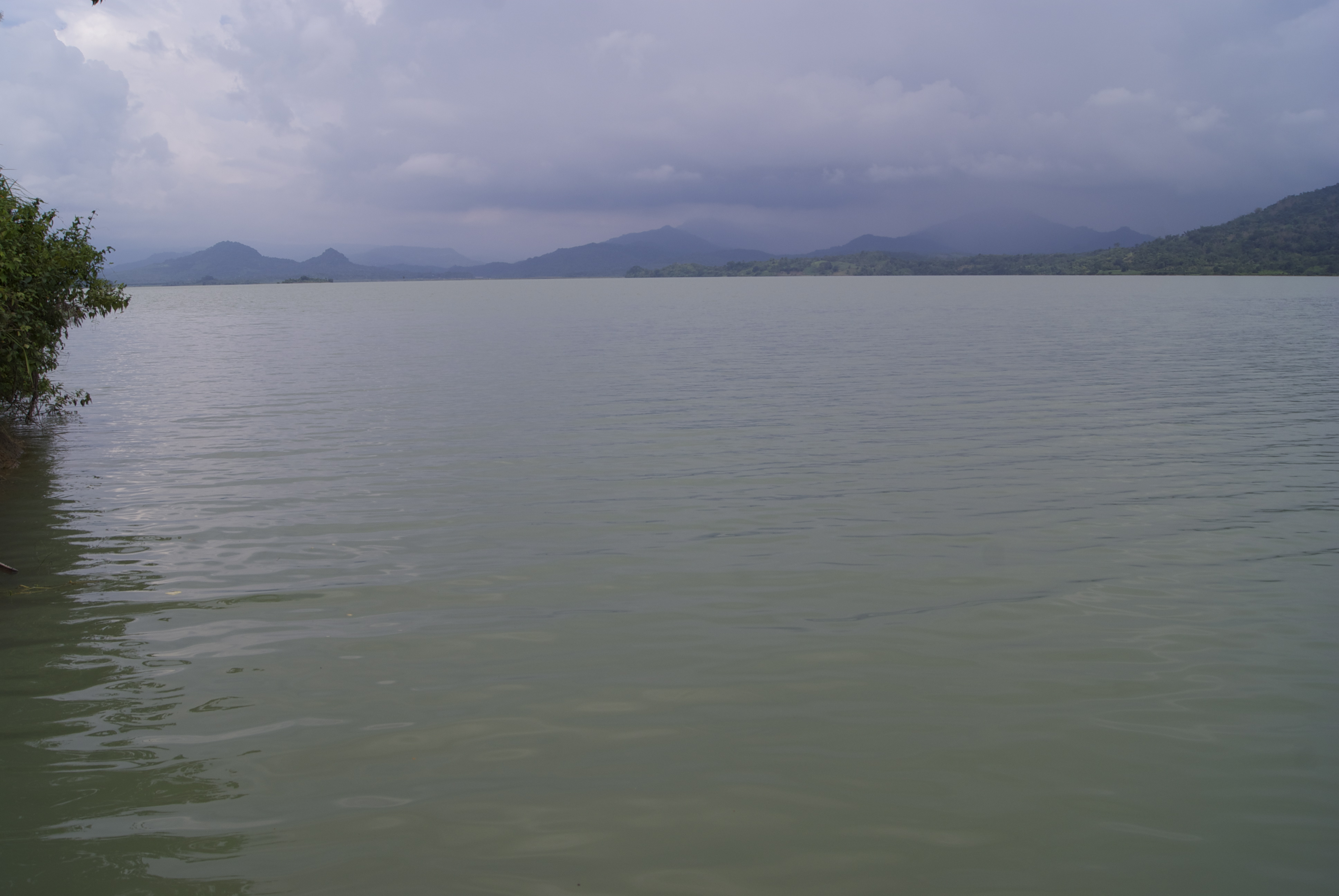
Bili-Bili Dam in South Sulawesi

The river rises near the 2833 meter high mountain Mount Bawakaraeng and runs through the districts of Gowa and Takalar up to the port city of Makassar, flowing into the Makassar Strait. Its final stretch physically separates the kelurahan of Barombong to the south from the rest of the city to the north. The river has flooded the city regularly, notably in 1976.

Approximately 40 km downstream is located is the 73 metre high Bili-Bili Dam, completed in 1999 with an internal volume of 380 million cubic meters.

On 26 March 2004 a landslide occurred in the upper reaches of the Jeneberang, killing 32 people. On 22 January 2019, the river overflowed due to heavy rain, causing a flood that killed dozens.

== Geography ==
The river flows in the southwest area of Sulawesi with predominantly tropical monsoon climate (designated as Am in the Köppen-Geiger climate classification). The annual average temperature in the area is 25 °C. The warmest month is October, when the average temperature is around 28 °C, and the coldest is February, at 22 °C. The average annual rainfall is 2750 mm. The wettest month is January, with an average of 671 mm rainfall, and the driest is September, with 10 mm rainfall.

Jene Berang

Climate chart (precipitation, max. and min. temperature)
| J | F | M | A | M | J | J | A | S | O | N | D |
| 671 24 22 | 356 25 20 | 343 24 21 | 246 27 23 | 180 29 22 | 151 29 22 | 96 28 21 | 17 32 21 | 10 35 22 | 47 35 22 | 172 30 22 | 463 26 23 |
- █ Average max. and min. temperatures in °C
- █ Precipitation totals in mm
Imperial conversion
| J | F | M | A | M | J | J | A | S | O | N | D |
| 26 75 72 | 14 77 68 | 14 75 70 | 9.7 81 73 | 7.1 84 72 | 5.9 84 72 | 3.8 82 70 | 0.7 90 70 | 0.4 95 72 | 1.9 95 72 | 6.8 86 72 | 18 79 73 |
- █ Average max. and min. temperatures in °F
- █ Precipitation totals in inches

== See also ==
- List of drainage basins of Indonesia
- List of rivers of Indonesia
- List of rivers of Sulawesi
