= Sadang River =

Coordinates: 3.6514°S 119.4679°E

Sadang River Sungai Sadang, Salo Sadang, Salo Sa’dang, Salu Saqdan
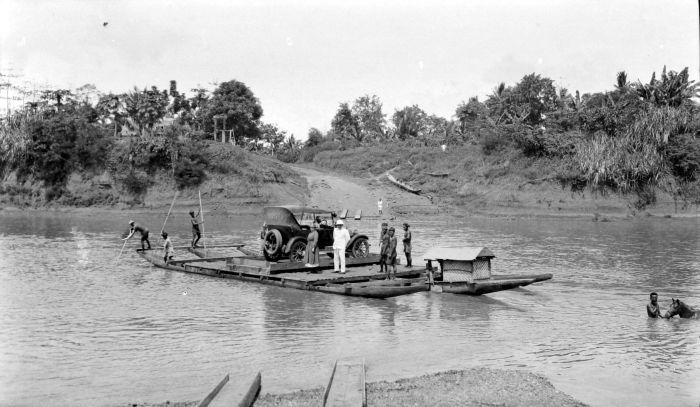
- Sadang river

- Location of river mouth Sadang River (Indonesia)

Location
- Country: Indonesia
- State: South Sulawesi

Physical characteristics
- Length: 150 km (93 mi)
- Basin size: 6,466 km^{2} (2,497 mi^{2})
- Discharge
  - location: Near mouth
  - average: 265 m^{3}/s (9,400 cu ft/s)

The Sadang is a river of Sulawesi in West Sulawesi province, Indonesia. It is one of the major rivers which flow into the Strait of Macassar.

== Geography ==
The river flows in the southwest area of Sulawesi with predominantly tropical rainforest climate (designated as Af in the Köppen-Geiger climate classification). The annual average temperature in the area is 24 °C. The warmest month is October, when the average temperature is around 26 °C, and the coldest is June, at 22 °C. The average annual rainfall is 2500 mm. The wettest month is May, with an average of 387 mm rainfall, and the driest is September, with 68 mm rainfall.

== See also ==
- List of drainage basins of Indonesia
- List of rivers of Sulawesi
- List of rivers of Indonesia
