= Walanae River =

Coordinates: 4.3741°S 120.3632°E

Walanae River Sungai Walanae, Sungai Cenranae, Salo Welonge, Salo Walanae
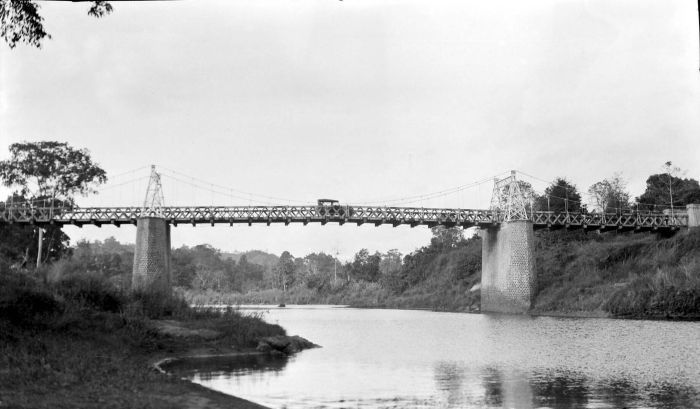
- Bridge over the River Walanae near Watansoppeng in the 1920s or 1930s

- Location of river mouth Walanae River (Indonesia)

Location
- Country: Indonesia
- Province: South Sulawesi

Physical characteristics
- Source: Mount Rupulumuwe
  - location: Pattuku, Bontocani, Bone Regency
- Mouth: Muara Cenranae, Gulf of Boni
  - location: Cenrana, Bone Regency
- Length: 250 km (160 mi)
- Basin size: 7,380 km^{2} (2,850 mi^{2})
- Width
  - minimum: 10 m (33 ft)
  - maximum: 15 m (49 ft)
- Discharge
  - location: Near mouth
  - average: 272 m^{3}/s (9,600 cu ft/s)

Walanae River is a river in South Sulawesi on the island of Sulawesi, Indonesia, about 1500km northeast of the capital Jakarta.

== Geography ==
The river flows in the southwest area of Sulawesi with a predominantly tropical monsoon climate (designated as Am in the Köppen-Geiger climate classification). The annual average temperature in the area is 23°C. The warmest month is October when the average temperature is around 25°C, and the coldest is July, at 21°C. The average annual rainfall is 2550mm. The wettest month is January, with an average of 404mm of rainfall, and the driest is September, with 29mm of rainfall.

Walanae River

Climate chart (precipitation, max. and min. temperature)
J	F	M	A	M	J	J	A	S	O	N	D
404 23 20	174 24 22	264 25 22	294 25 22	303 24 21	238 24 22	193 24 18	45 26 21	29 28 20	92 29 21	187 28 21	329 26 20
- █ Average max. and min. temperatures in °C
- █ Precipitation totals in mm
Imperial conversion
J	F	M	A	M	J	J	A	S	O	N	D
16 73 68	6.9 75 72	10 77 72	12 77 72	12 75 70	9.4 75 72	7.6 75 64	1.8 79 70	1.1 82 68	3.6 84 70	7.4 82 70	13 79 68
- █ Average max. and min. temperatures in °F
- █ Precipitation totals in inches

== See also ==
- List of drainage basins of Indonesia
- List of rivers of Indonesia
- List of rivers of Sulawesi
