= Gowa Regency =

Regency in South Sulawesi, Indonesia

Gowa Regency Kabupaten Gowa
- Regency

Regional transcription(s)
  - Makassar: ᨅᨘᨈ ᨁᨚᨓ
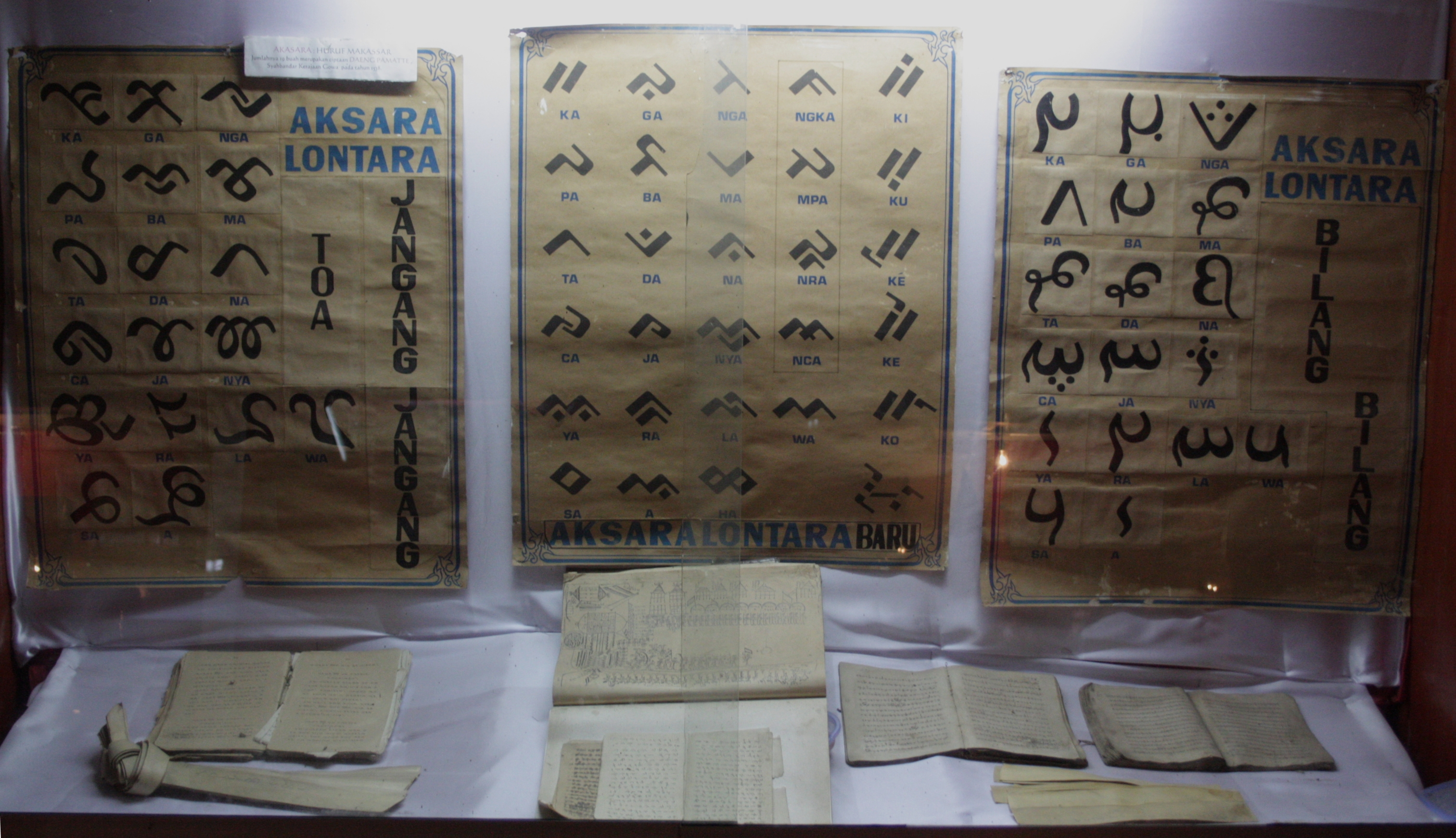
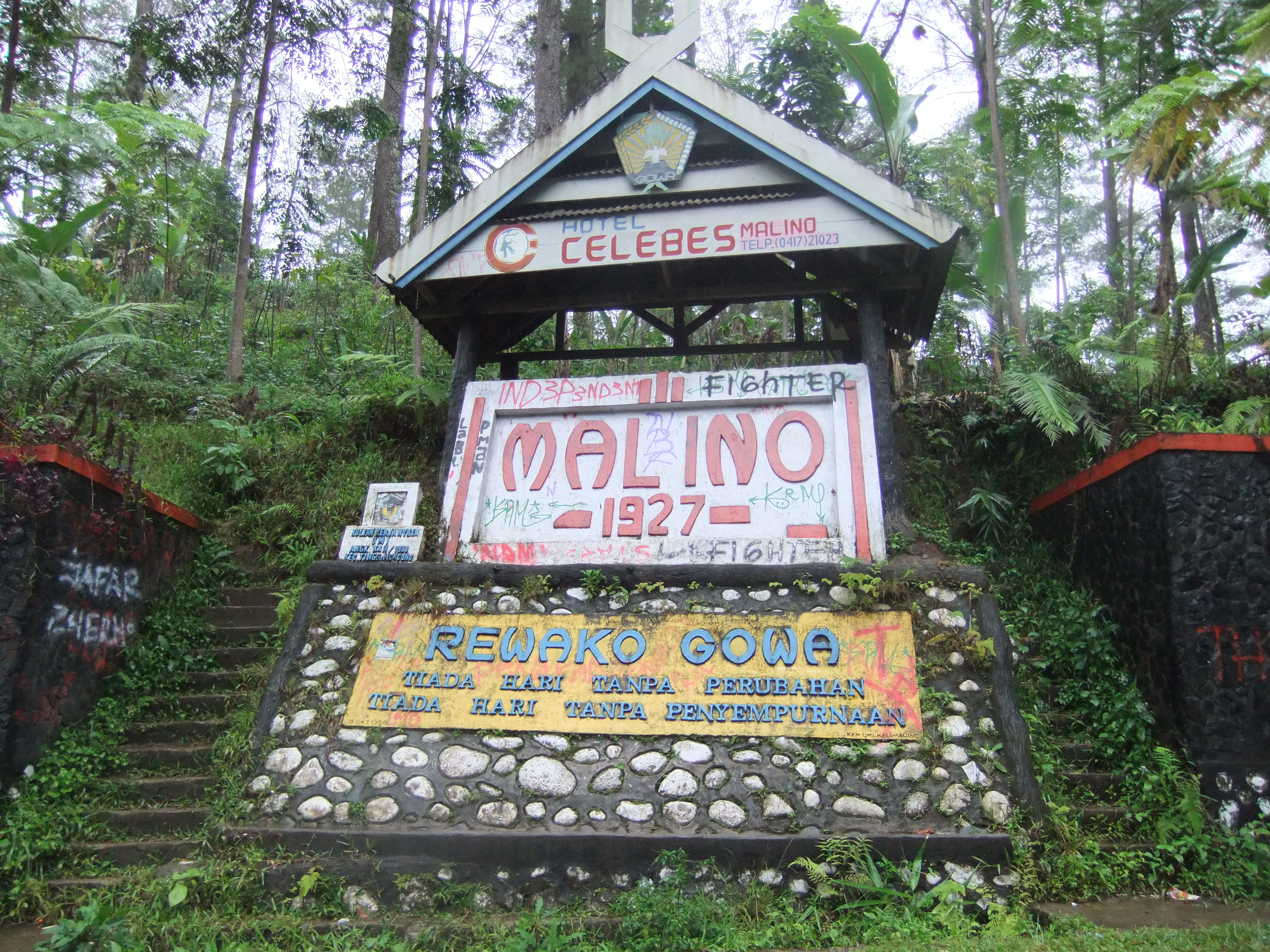
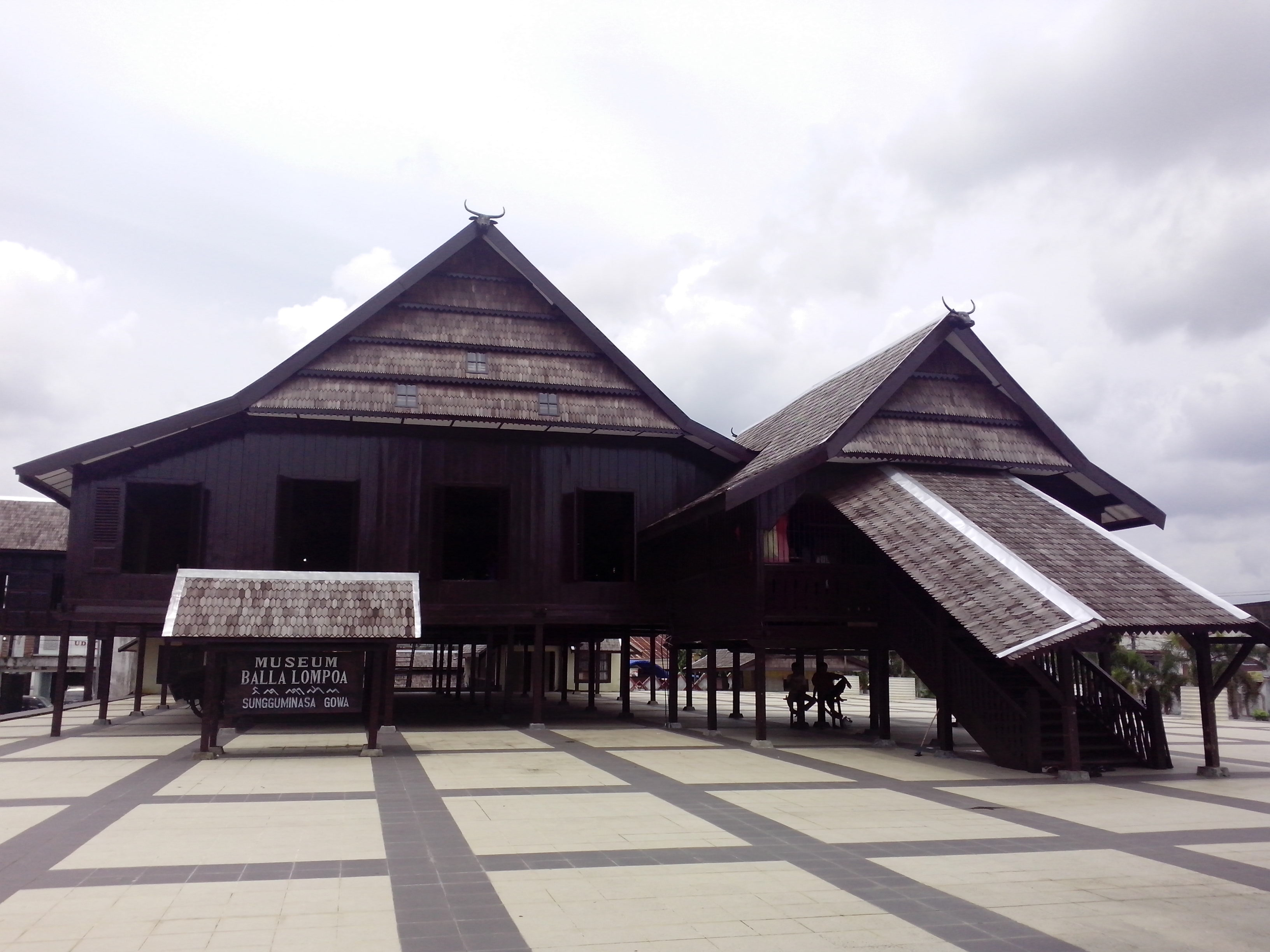
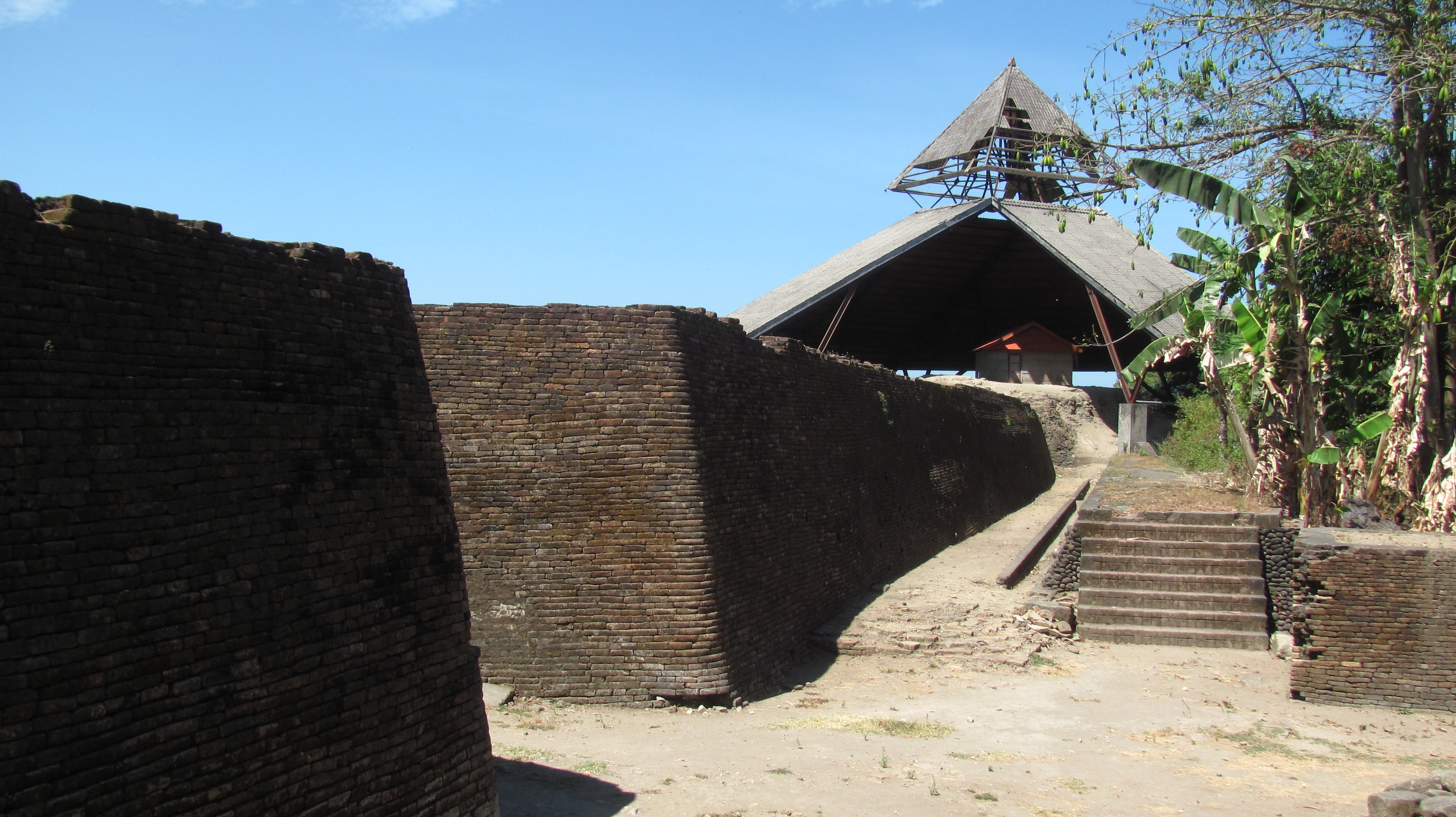
- Clockwise from top : Lontara' Script in Balla Lompoa, Tamalate Palace, The Twin Bridge and Jeneberang River, Syech Yusuf Great Mosque, Fort Somba Opu, Malino Town City of Flower

- Seal
- Motto(s): Rewako Gowa; Slogan: Gowa Bersejarah; Clean, prosperous, neat, safe, and green.
- Location within South Sulawesi

- Location in Sulawesi
- Coordinates: 5°19′3″S 119°44′23″E
- Country: Indonesia
- Province: South Sulawesi
- Metropolitan area: Mamminasata
- Founded: 17 November 1320
- Capital: Sungguminasa

Government
  - Regent: Sitti Husniah Talenrang
  - Vice Regent: Darmawangsyah Muin

Area
  - Total: 1,883.33 km^{2} (727.16 sq mi)

Population (mid 2025 Estimate)
  - Total: 841,730
  - Density: 446.94/km^{2} (1,157.6/sq mi)
- Time zone: UTC+8 (WITA)
- Website: Official Website of the Government of Gowa Regency

Gowa (Makassar language : ᨁᨚᨓ) is a regency in the province of South Sulawesi, Indonesia, and includes many of the suburbs of the city of Makassar on its landward side. It has an area of 1,883.33 km^{2} and a population of 652,329 at the 2010 census, increasing to 765,836 at the 2020 census; the official estimate at mid-2025 was 841,730 (comprising 416,797 males and 424,933 females). The majority of the regency (the western eleven districts, with 664,883 inhabitants, or 79% of the regency's population in mid 2025) lies within the official metropolitan area of the city of Makassar, including the regency's administrative capital at Sungguminasa. The hill resort of Malino is in the eastern (non-metropolitan) part of the regency.

== Geography ==
Gowa is located at 12°38.16'E Longitude of Jakarta and 5°33.6'E longitude of the North Pole. While the location of the region his administration between, 12°33.19 'to 13°15:17'E longitude and 5°5' to 5°34.7'S latitude of Jakarta.

The regency is located in the southern part of South Sulawesi province, and is bordered to the north by the city of Makassar and Maros Regency, to the east by Sinjai Regency, Bulukumba Regency and Bantaeng, to the south by Takalar and Jeneponto Regencies, and to the west by the city of Makassar and Takalar Regency.

The total area is 1,883.33 km^{2}, equal to 3.01% of the area of South Sulawesi province. Gowa regency is divided into eighteen districts, comprising 167 villages and 726 hamlets.

The Bili-Bili Dam, located about 30 km from Makassar, was completed in 1998.

== Administrative districts ==
The regency is divided into eighteen districts (kecamatan), with their area, population at the 2010 and 2020 census, and the mid 2025 official population estimates tabulated below. The table also includes the locations of the district administrative centres, their post code and the number of administrative villages in each district (totaling 121 rural desa and 46 urban kelurahan).

Location	Kode Wilayah	Name of District (kecamatan)	Area in km^{2}	Pop'n census 2010	Pop'n census 2020	Pop'n Estimate mid 2025	Admin centre	No. of villages	Post code
	73.06.01	Bontonompo	30.39	39,295	44,998	47,559	Tamallayang	14 ^{(a)}	92153
	73.06.16	Bontonompo Selatan (South Bontonompo)	29.24	28,471	32,118	33,546	Pabundukang	9 ^{(b)}	92154
	73.06.02	Bajeng	60.09	62,334	72,066	77,912	Kalebajeng	14 ^{(c)}	92152
	73.06.18	Bajeng Barat (West Bajeng)	19.04	22,918	26,639	29,590	Borimatangkasa	7	92151
	73.06.07	Pallangga	48.24	98,721	127,837	139,839	Mangalli	16 ^{(d)}	92161
	73.06.12	Barombong	20.67	34,527	45,192	49,802	Kanjilo	7 ^{(e)}	90225
	73.06.08	Somba Opu	28.09	130,287	156,108	161,895	Sungguminasa	14 ^{(f)}	92111 -92119
	73.06.06	Bontomarannu	52.63	31,250	41,016	48,337	Borongloe	9 ^{(g)}	92171
	73.06.13	Pattallassang	84.96	21,881	30,254	38,939	Pattallassang	8	92172
	73.06.05	Parangloe	221.26	16,564	18,628	20,468	Lanna	7 ^{(h)}	92179
	73.06.14	Manuju	91.90	14,093	14,591	16,996	Moncongloe	7	92173
	73.06.04	Tinggimoncong	142.87	22,138	23,331	24,745	Malino	7 ^{(j)}	92178
	73.06.10	Tombolo Pao	251.82	26,876	29,779	32,367	Tamaona	9 ^{(k)}	92170
	73.06.17	Parigi	132.76	13,089	13,289	14,562	Majannang	5	92174
	73.06.09	Bungaya	175.53	15,847	16,742	19,436	Sapaya	7 ^{(l)}	92177
	73.06.15	Bontolempangan	142.46	13,332	14,781	18,294	Bontoloe	8	92176
	73.05.03	Tompobulu	132.54	28,971	28,393	32,434	Malakaji	8 ^{(m)}	92175
	73.06.11	Biringbulu	218.84	32,347	30,073	35,009	Lauwa	11 ^{(n)}	90244
		Gowa Regency	1,883.33	652,941	765,836	841,730		167	
of which the part	within the	metropolitan area	686.51	500,341	609,447	664,883		112	

Notes: (a) includes the 3 kelurahan of Bontonompo, Kalaserena and Tamallayang. (b) includes one kelurahan of Bontoramba.
(c) includes the 4 kelurahan of Kalebajeng, Limbung, Mata Allo and Tubajeng. (d) includes the 4 kelurahan of Mangalli, Pangkabinanga, Parangbanoa and Tetebatu.
(e) including the 2 kelurahan of Benteng Somba Opu and Lembang Parang.
(f) all 14 are kelurahan - Batangkaluku, Bonto-Bontoa, Bontoramba, Kalegowa, Katangka, Mawang, Paccinongang, Pandang-Pandang, Romangpolong, Samata, Sungguminasa, Tamarunang, Tombolo and Tompobalang.
(g) including the 3 kelurahan of Bontomanai, Borongloe and Romang Lompoa. (h) including the 2 kelurahan of Bontoparang and Lanna.
(j) comprising 6 kelurahan (Bonto Lerung, Bulutana, Gantarang, Garassi, Malino and Pattapang) and one desa.
(k) including one kelurahan of Tamaona. (l) including the 2 kelurahan of Je'nebatu and Sapaya.
(m) including the 2 kelurahan of Cikoro and Malakaji. (n) including the 2 kelurahan of Lauwa and Tonrorita.

The first eleven of the eighteen districts tabulated above lie within the official metropolitan area of the city of Makassar; the remaining seven districts lie outside that area.

== Economy ==
=== Mining ===
Mineral deposits, group C along the Watershed (DAS) Jenebarang, such as sand, stone and gravel hereditary able to provide for the surrounding population. The contribution of this sector in economic activity in 2000 amounting to Rp.105,4 billion, or 9.13 percent, but the contribution of this sector to the regency government's treasury is significant.

In fiscal year 2001, the district government targeted Rp. 2.03 billion of tax excavated material to fill a class C revenue (PAD). Quarrying activities was quite large because in addition to the availability of material from the DAS, there was also mountain stone and clay. The trucks transporting this material moved along protocol roads connecting with Gowa Makassar.

Excavated material is capable of providing for cash receipts for Gowa Regency. Pos dominates income tax up to 65 percent in the 2001 fiscal year revenue in the amount of Rp. 3.11 billion.

=== Agriculture ===
Gowa's real potential is agriculture. The main job of the regency in 2000 per capita income of Rp. 2.09 million is farming, with the food crops sub-sector as the mainstay. The agricultural sector contributed 45 percent or Rp. 515.2 billion.

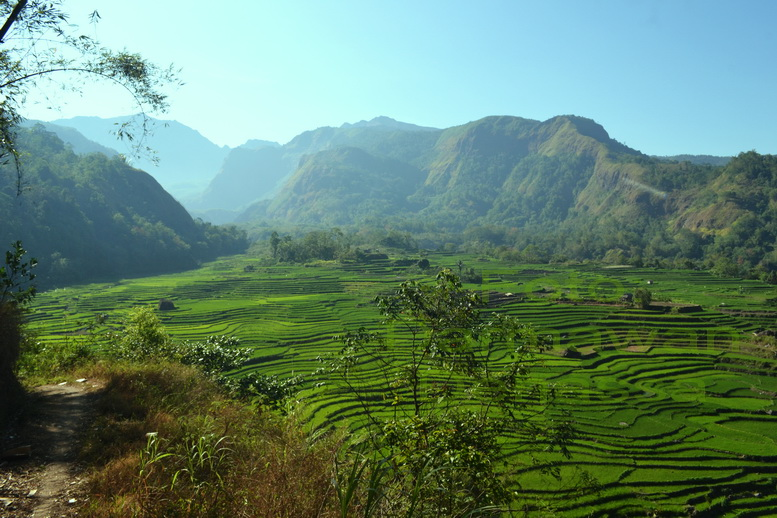
Rice Field in Parigi, Gowa Regency, South Sulawesi

Paddy fields were less than 20 percent (3,640 hectares) of the total land area of the regency and is able to provide sufficient results. There is also production of various agricultural crops such as rice and other crops, and horticultural crops.

Sub-districts in the highlands like Parangloe, Bungaya and especially Tinggimoncong are vegetable producing centers. The most widely cultivated vegetables are potatoes, cabbage, mustard, onion and beans. Per year, the harvest of vegetables exceed 5,000 tons. Vegetables of Gowa Makassar city is able to meet the market and its surroundings, even to the island of Borneo and the Maluku through the port of Pare Pare and Port Mamuju.

In addition to farming vegetables that have a short growing season, there are many farmers in Gowa who also who farm crops with longevity. One of them is the passion fruit plant (Fassifora sp). Visited Makassar less afdol feel if not bring fruit or juice passion fruit syrup hands. Plants from the mainland of South America are synonymous with South Sulawesi. Kanreapia Village, District Tinggimoncong is one of the passion fruit producing areas in Gowa. Passion fruit becomes sour. The taste of the fruit is sweet and capable of moving a small food and beverage industry, but it is now beginning to be less desirable to farmers. Planting of passion is not easy, except for the long cropping period, and they require special care, such as high surface soil, fertilizers and drugs which are quite expensive.

Furthermore, the price of passion fruit is also unstable and likely to continue to decline. These vines have one harvest per year (November to January) with a production of about 300,000 fruit per hectare. The price at the time of harvest for one kilo (approximately 25 pieces) was only Rp. 500,- up to Rp. 800,- so that farmers only received Rp 6.0 million to Rp 9.6 million per hectare. This situation causes the passion fruit planting area to continue to decline. In 1996 there were 1,241 hectares with a production of 21,861 tonnes. Four years later the planting area consisted of 854 hectares with a production of 7,189 tons. Many farmers are switching crops from passion fruit to vegetables.

== Sights and tourism ==
One of the most important sights is Fortress Samba Opu (Benteng Samba Opu) in the town of Sunggumninasa. A part of the walls including a round tower are just being restored. The strongest wall with a thickness of seven metres was built in the west towards the sea as Sultan Hasanuddin feared an attack from this direction. Weapons, coins, traditional clothing etc. are on display in a museum in the middle of the fortress. Various houses in the traditional styles of eleven different peoples of southern Sulawesi were built in the fortress.

=== Parangloe Tiered Waterfall ===
Parangloe Tiered Waterfall is located in Parangloe district, 42 kilometers east of Makassar with severely damaged road and then 1.5 kilometers in a half hour walk.

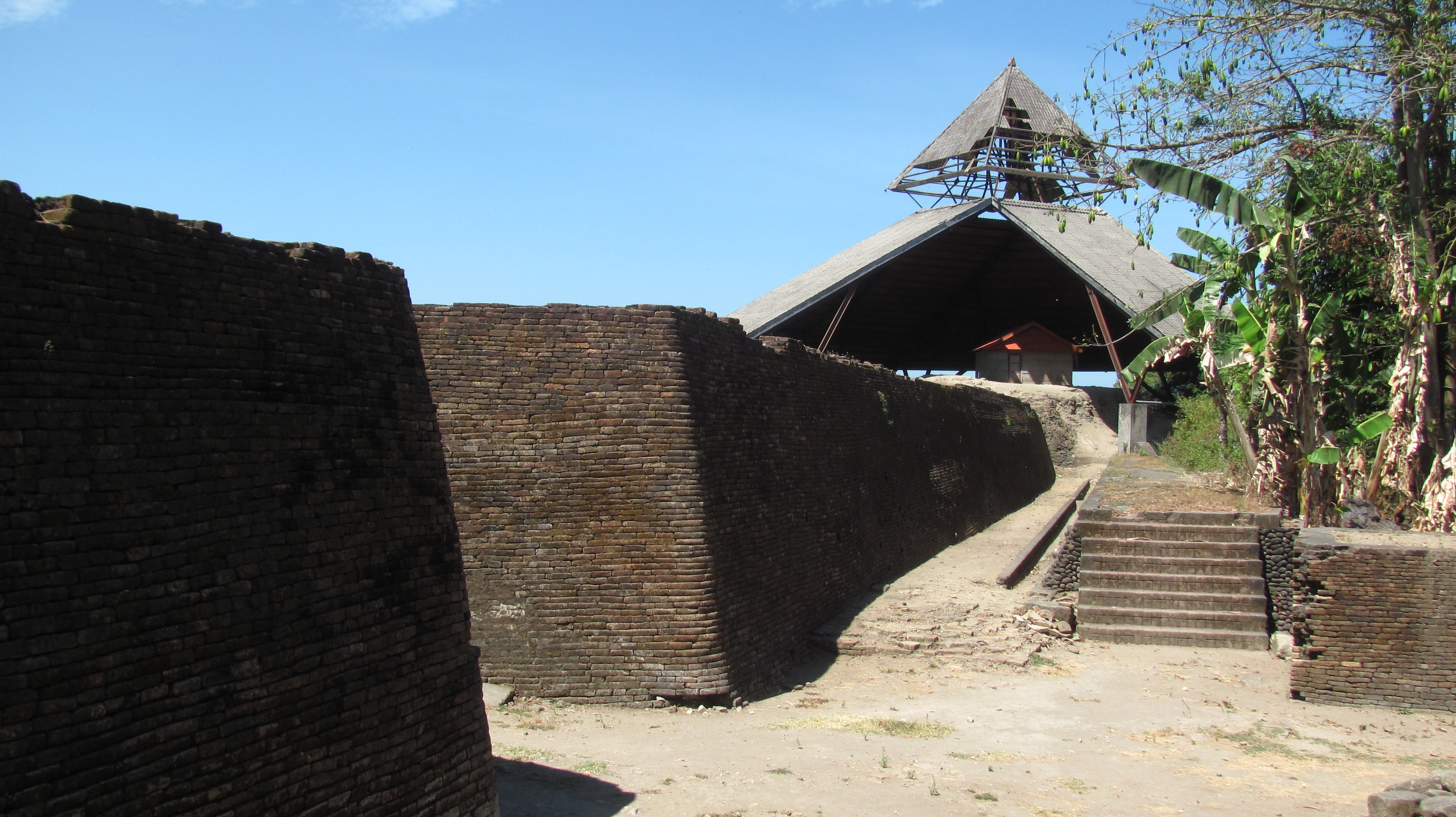
Fortress Samba Opu

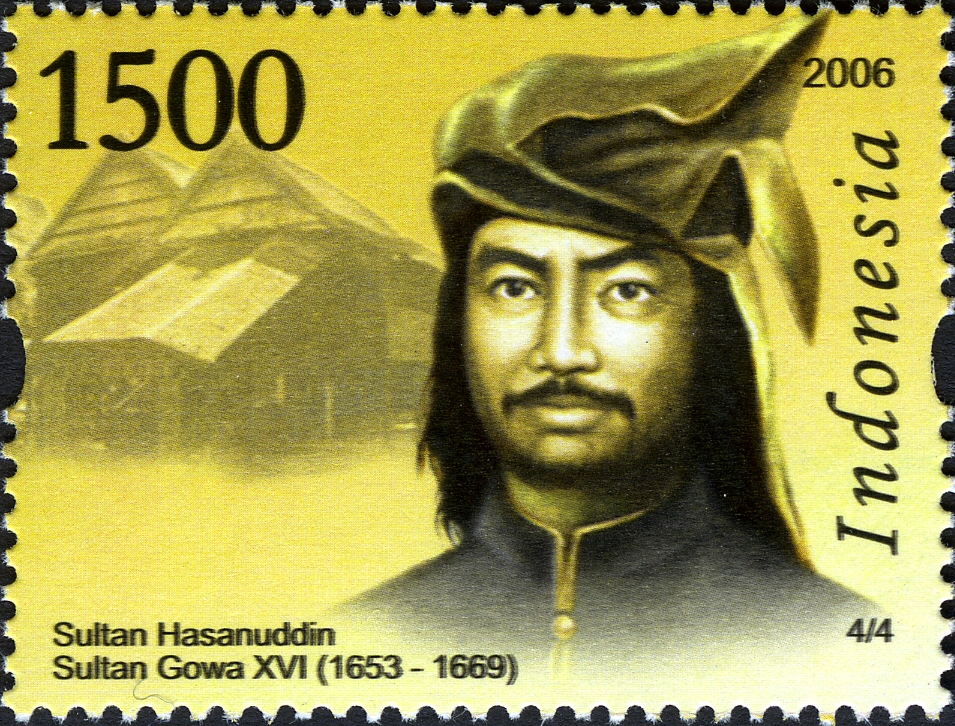
Sultan Hasanuddin of Gowa

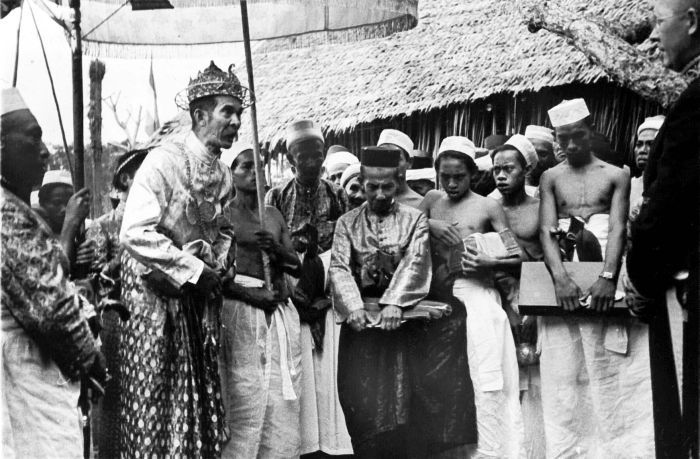
Mangi Mangi Karaeng Bontonompo, king of Gowa, with the public and some dignitaries during the installation of acting governor of Celebes and dependencies, Mr. Bosselaar, 1937

Flag of Sultanate of Gowa

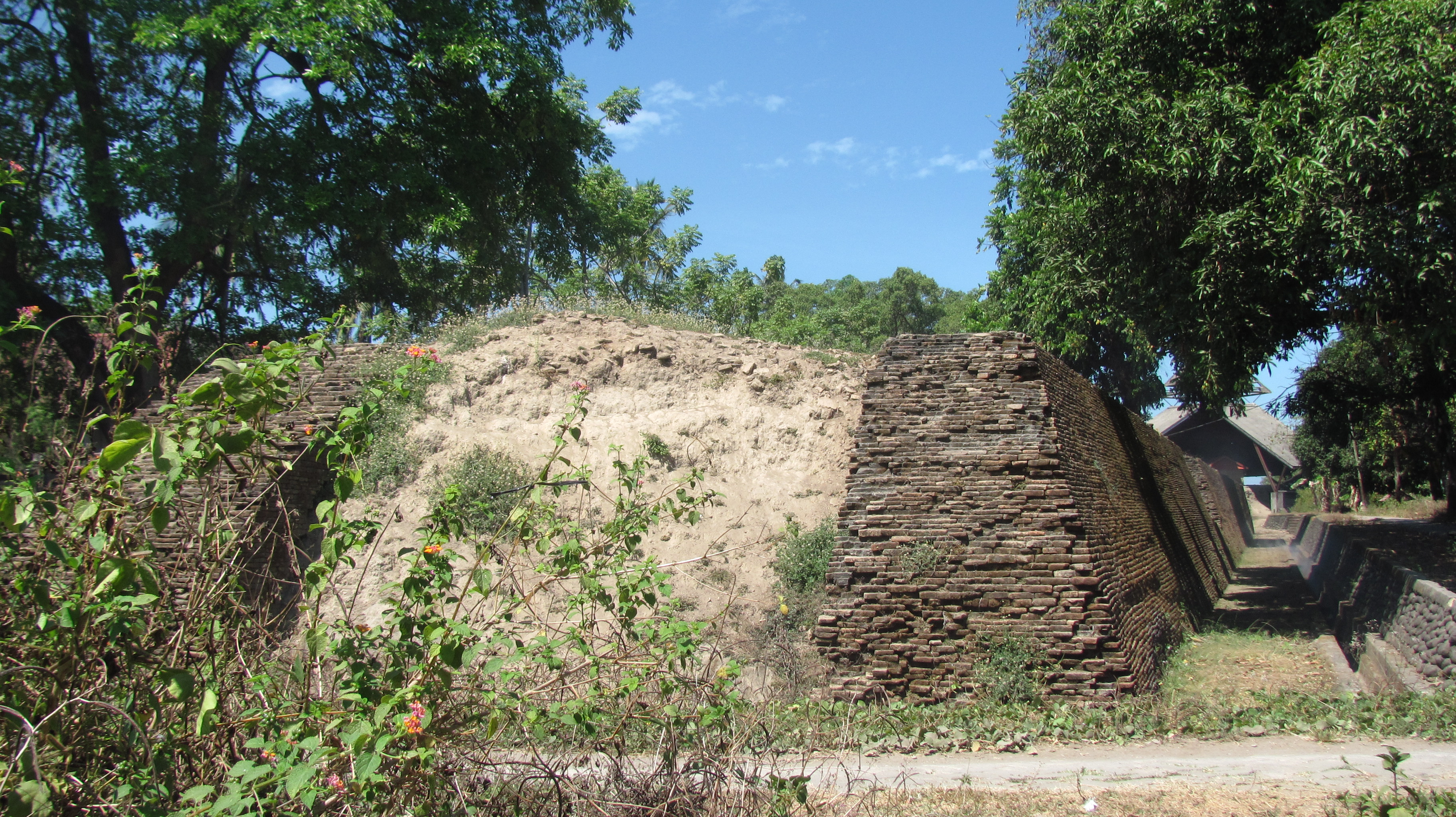
Western wall of the fortress

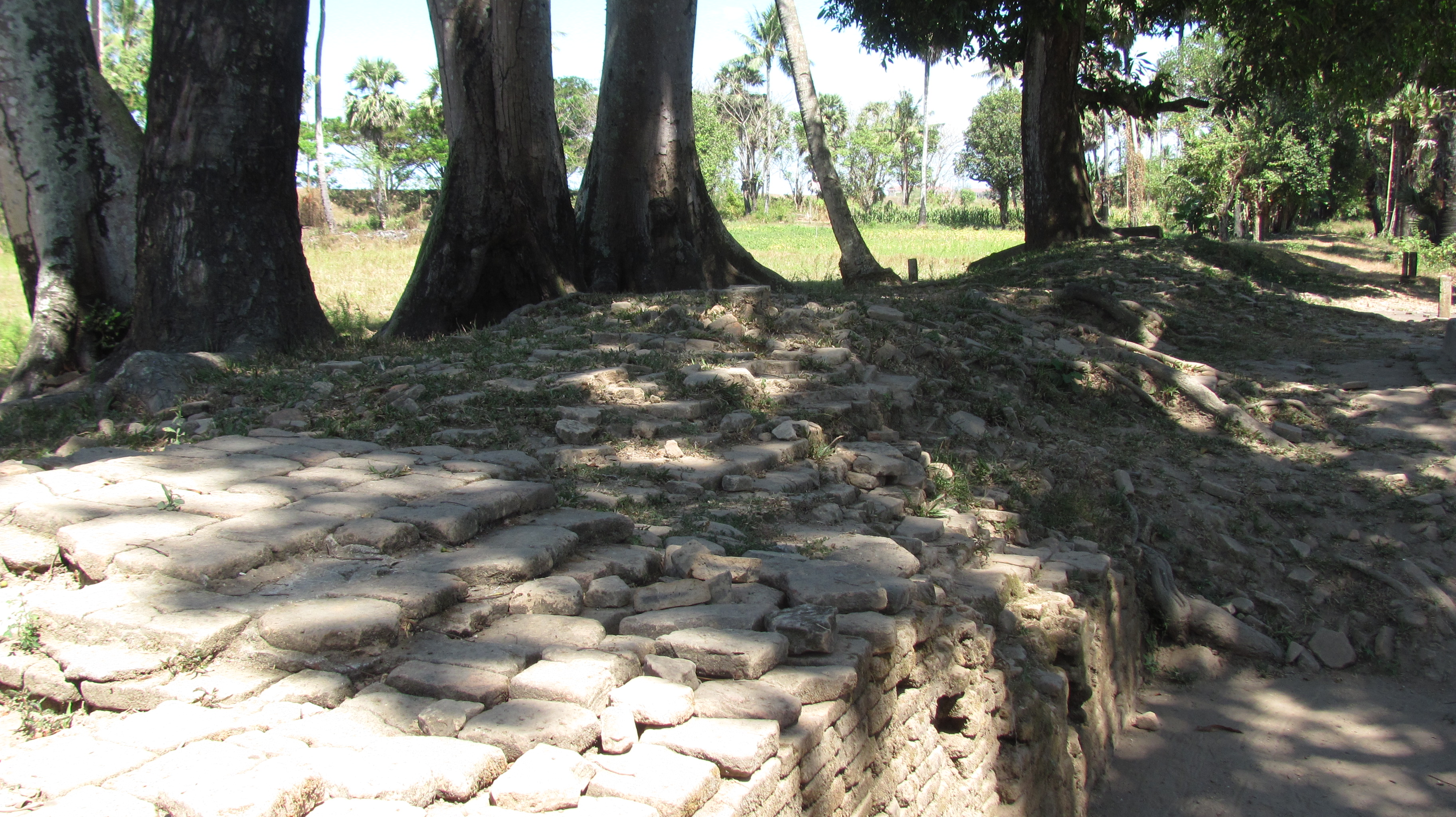
Wall being restored

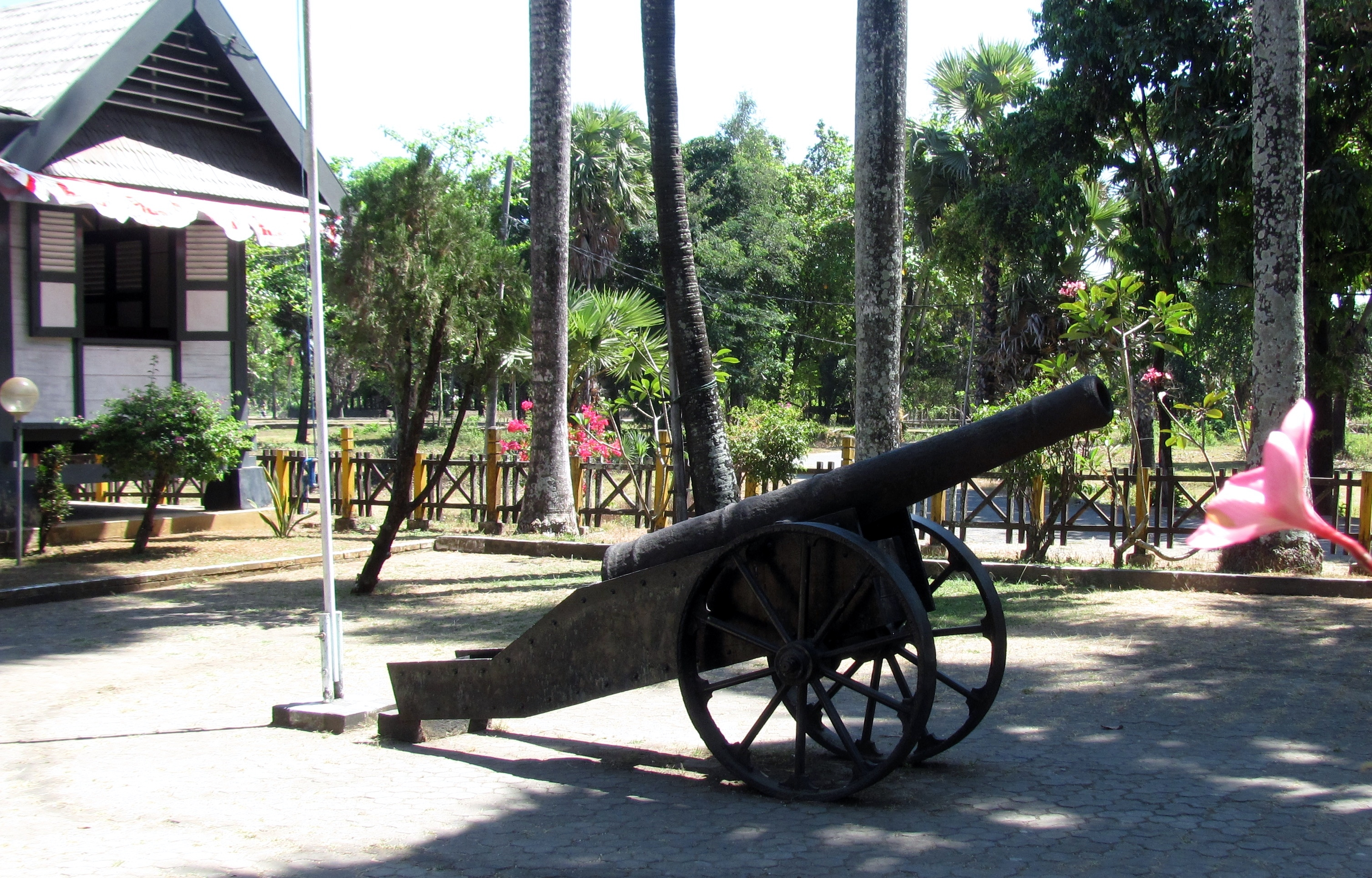
Museum and canon in the fortress of Samba Opu
