= 2010 eruptions of Mount Merapi =

Volcanic eruptions in Indonesia

2010 eruption of Mount Merapi
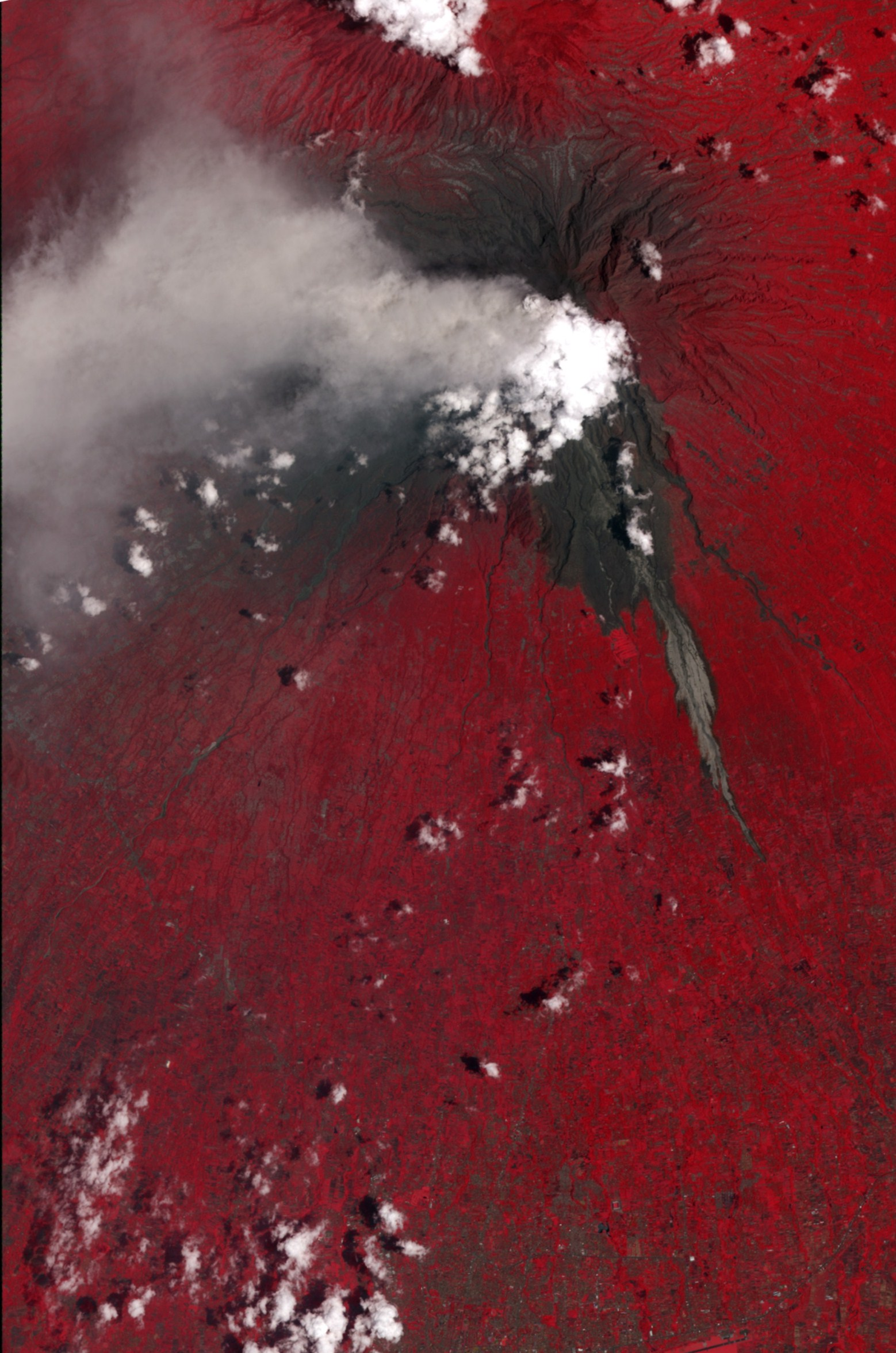
- False-colour satellite image showing evidence of a large pyroclastic flow along the Gendol River south of Mount Merapi
- Volcano: Mount Merapi
- Start date: 26 October 2010
- Start time: 17.02 WIB
- End date: 29 November 2010
- Location: Central Java, Special Region of Yogyakarta, Indonesia; 07°32′27″S 110°26′41″E
- VEI: 4
- Impact: 386 deaths

In late October 2010, Mount Merapi, on the border of Central Java and Special Region of Yogyakarta, began an increasingly violent series of eruptions that continued into November. Seismic activity around the volcano increased from mid-September onwards, culminating in repeated outbursts of lava and volcanic ash. Large eruption columns formed, causing a number of pyroclastic flows down the heavily populated slopes of the volcano. The 2010 eruption of Merapi was the volcano's largest since 1872.

Over 350,000 people were evacuated from the affected area. Multiple others remained behind or returned to their homes while the eruptions were continuing. 386 people were killed during the eruptions, many as a result of pyroclastic flows. The ash plumes from the volcano also caused major disruptions to aviation across Java.

The mountain continued to erupt until 30 November 2010. On 3 December 2010 the official alert status was reduced to level 3, from level 4, as the eruptive activity had subsided.

== Volcanic eruptions ==
=== Recent background ===
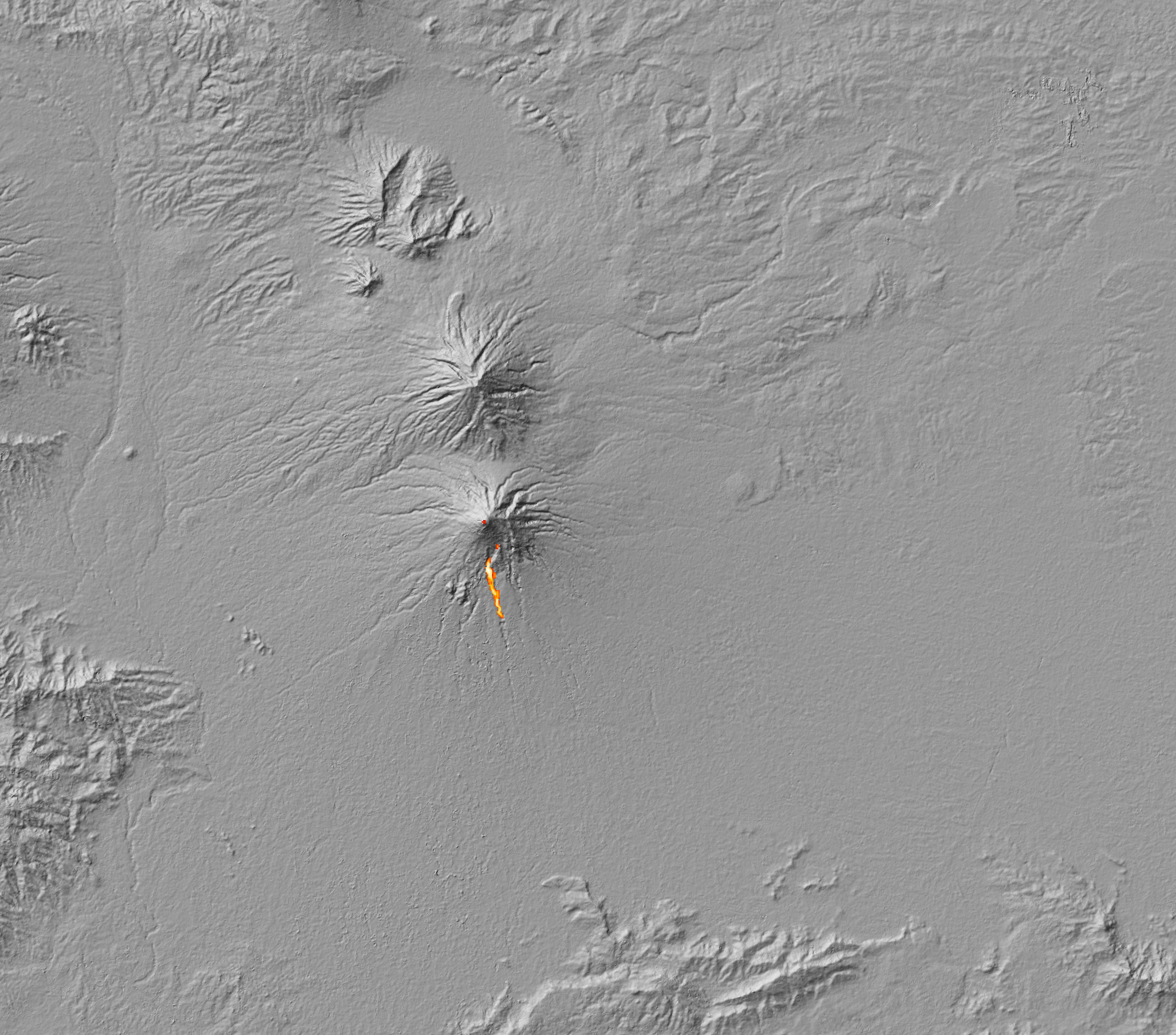
Thermal signature of hot ash and rock and a glowing lava dome on Mount Merapi (1 November 2010)

In late October 2010 the Volcanological Survey of Indonesia (PVMBG) reported that a pattern of increasing seismicity from Merapi had begun to emerge in early September. Observers at Babadan 7 km (4.3 mi) west and Kaliurang 8 km (5.0 mi) south of the mountain reported hearing an avalanche on 12 September 2010. On 14 September 2010 white plumes were observed rising 800 m (2,600 ft) above the crater. Lava dome inflation, detected since March, increased from background levels of 0.1 to 0.3 mm (0.0039 to 0.012 in) per day to a rate of 11 mm (0.43 in) per day on 16 September. On 19 September 2010 earthquakes continued to be numerous, and the next day CVGHM raised the Alert Level to 2 (on a scale of 1–4). Lava from Mount Merapi began flowing down the Gendol River on 23–24 October signalling the likelihood of an imminent eruption.

On 25 October 2010 the Indonesian government raised the alert for Mount Merapi to its highest level (4) and warned villagers in threatened areas to move to safer ground. People living within a 10 km (6.2 mi) zone were told to evacuate. The evacuation orders affected at least 19,000 people however the number that complied at the time remained unclear to authorities. Officials said about 500 volcanic earthquakes had been recorded on the mountain over the weekend of 23–24 October, and that the magma had risen to about a 1 km (3,300 ft) below the surface due to the seismic activity.

=== Chronology of eruptive events ===
==== Tuesday, 26 October ====
The Volcano’s eruptions started at 17:02 . By 18:54 pyroclastic activity had begun to subside following 12 eruption-associated events being recorded by CVGHM monitors. 232 volcanic seismic events, 269 avalanche seismic events, four lava flow seismic events and six pyroclastic flows were recorded in the 24 hours of 26 October. The eruptive events were classified as explosive events with volcanic bursts of ejected material, visible flame and pyroclastic hot air flows. A column of smoke rose from the top to a vertical distance of 1.5 km (4,900 ft) from the summit of Mount Merapi. The first fatalities occurred on this day, including Mas Penewu Surakso Hargo, better known as Mbah Maridjan ("Grandfather Maridjan", the "gatekeeper" of the pyramids.

==== Friday, 29 October ====
On Friday eruptive activity included lava ejection with hot ash clouds reported to be flowing 3 km (1.9 mi) down the slopes of the mountain and lasting four to nine minutes. Ash falls reached as far as the Central Java town of Magelang. Scientists monitoring the volcano including Surono, chief of the Volcanology and Geological Disaster Mitigation Center (PVMBG), expressed optimism that the volcanic activity should decrease following the release of lava. Safari Dwiyono, a scientist monitoring Mt. Merapi for 15 years, said the volcanic activity appeared to be easing pressure behind a lava dome that had formed in the crater. The International Red Cross reported that on 29 October, from 07:23 to 21:40, pyroclastic flow from Merapi struck Lamat River, Senowo River, and Krasak River.

==== Saturday, 30 October ====
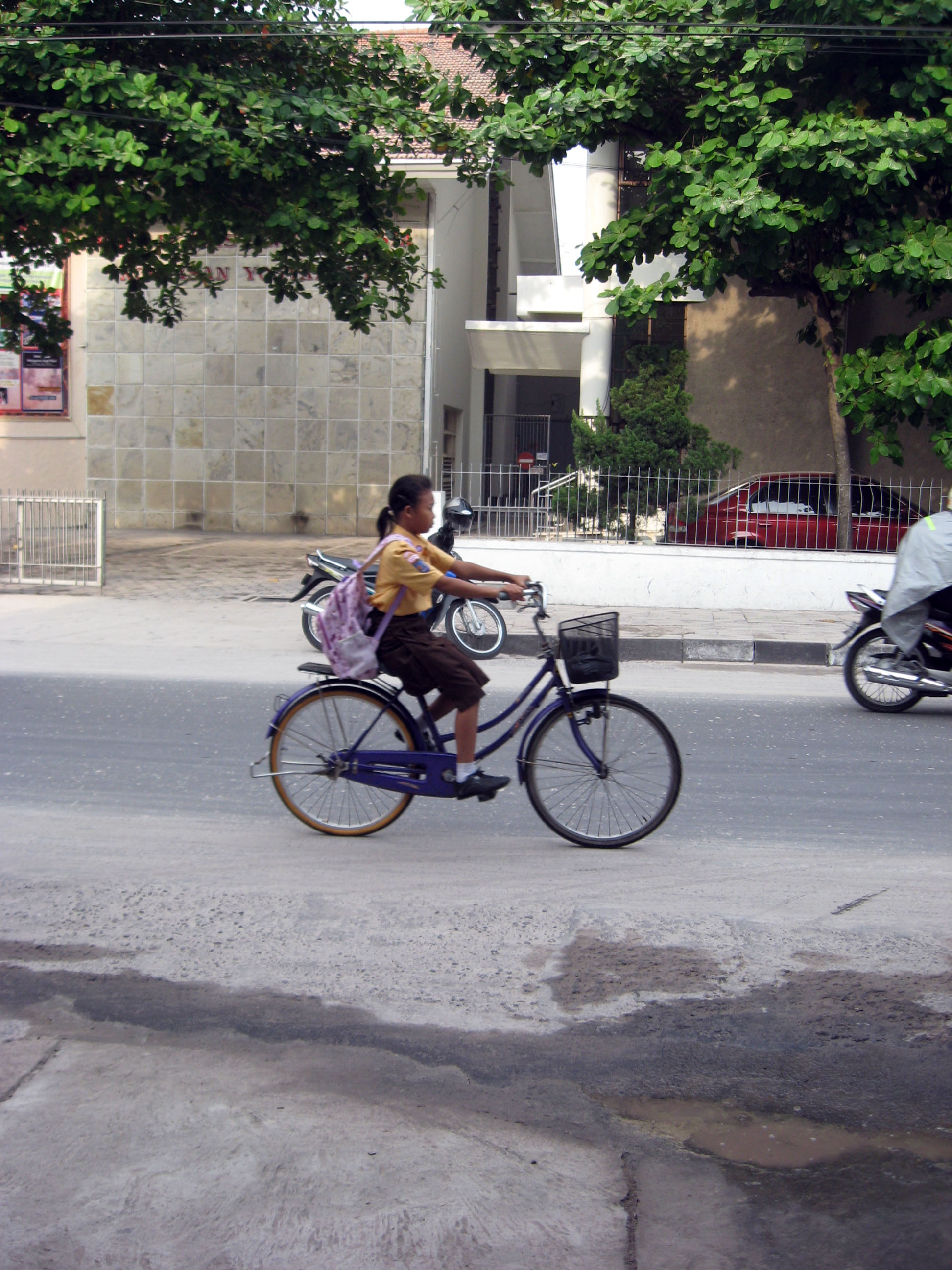
Due to the ashfall being light in Yogyakarta, few schools were closed in the beginning.

By early on the morning of Saturday 30 October the volcano was erupting again. Sri Sumarti, head of the Merapi section at the Volcano Investigation and Technology Development Institution (BPPTK), reported the eruptions were louder and stronger than those of 26 October. Ash from the eruptions on 30 October fell more than 30 km (19 mi) away and now included ash falls upon the city of Yogyakarta. Soldiers and police posted nearest the volcano were seen fleeing along with hundreds of residents who quickly clogged roads with cars and motorcycles. Black soot fell across a vast area. The morning eruptions lasted for 22 minutes while pyroclastic flows flowed into the Krasak and Boyong River valleys and ash rose 3.5 km (11,000 ft) into the air, drifting westward toward Magelang. Yogyakarta's Adisucipto Airport was closed temporarily between 05:00 to 07:00. Later that day, Subandrio, head of the BPPTK suggested there would be further eruptions as magma continued to push its way up into the volcano's lava dome. A pyroclastic river flowed from Merapi again on 30 October 2010 at 00:35. A pyroclastic flow headed toward Gendol River, Kuning River, Krasak River, and Boyong River. This was then followed by an explosion from Merapi resulting in a two-kilometre vertical high fire ball rising from the top of the mountain. This eruption caused raining sand to fall on areas to a radius of up to 10 km (6.2 mi) from the volcano. Amongst activities from government and NGO's the Indonesian Red Cross and Red Crescent (PMI) had by this time fielded up to 398 volunteers from branches in the provinces of Central Java, and Yogyakarta. These volunteers assisted in disseminating information to communities to warn of Merapi's level IV volcanic activity. PMI also provided meals for 1,000 displaced people in the Dompol camp. One of these PMI volunteers, Tutur Priyanto, had died on the slopes on 26 October.

==== Monday, 1 November ====
The Center for Volcanology and Geological Hazard Mitigation observation outposts at Mount Merapi began observing at 00:00 and concluded at 06:00 and reported no significant visible activity. Merapi spewed hot clouds in the afternoon. Sulfatara smoke was visible from several posts and avalanches were observed. Mount Merapi erupted at 10:10 local time Monday morning spewing hot clouds and dark fog masses in easterly direction punctuated by loud explosions. Lt Col Soekoso Wahyudi, chief of the Boyolali district military command, was reported by Antara news as saying the explosions this time were louder than those of Sunday evening 31 October. The hot clouds descended on part of the mountain slopes and moved in easterly direction. Local military and police commands deployed personnel on roads in areas around the mountain to regulate traffic which had become clogged by vehicles and people rushing to leave the danger zones. Reports from Klaten, Sleman and Boyolali districts suggested the volcanic explosions were so loud they caused panic and a rush to seek refuge. Merapi's heat and hot ash clouds continued to erupt throughout the day. A thick eruptive ash cloud was reported to rise 1.5 km (4,900 ft) into the air. The Darwin VAAC reported that a possible eruption on 1 November produced an ash plume that rose to an altitude of 6.1 km (20,000 ft) a.s.l., according to ground-based reports, analyses of satellite imagery, and web camera views. The WHO reported that Mount Merapi spewed out hot clouds of gas and ash again on Monday morning, 1 November 2010 at around 10:05 local time. Clouds of hot ash and gas billowed up to 1.5 km (4,900 ft) into the atmosphere, before cascading back down up to 4 km (2.5 mi) around the slopes of Merapi. An uninterrupted stream of smoke clouds were sent into the air for 40 minutes, heading southward toward a nearby river in Sleman regency, and took with it an estimated 2 million cubic metres of rock and earth from the peak. From the previous eruption, Crisis Center MOH reported 42 people died and 103 people were admitted to several health facilities with respiratory difficulties and burn injuries. Up to 70,143 people were reported to have been displaced. Health problems amongst the evacuees included acute respiratory infection, eye irritation, cephalgia, and hypertension. Land transportation beyond the 10 km (6.2 mi) restricted area was not disrupted. Air transportation was affected for flights from and to Yogyakarta and Solo.

==== Tuesday, 2 November ====
On 2 November several airlines including Garuda, AirAsia and SilkAir with international flights to both Yogyakarta and Solo were either suspended or re-routed due to the eruptive activity. CVGHM reported 26 pyroclastic flows on 2 November.

==== Wednesday, 3 November ====
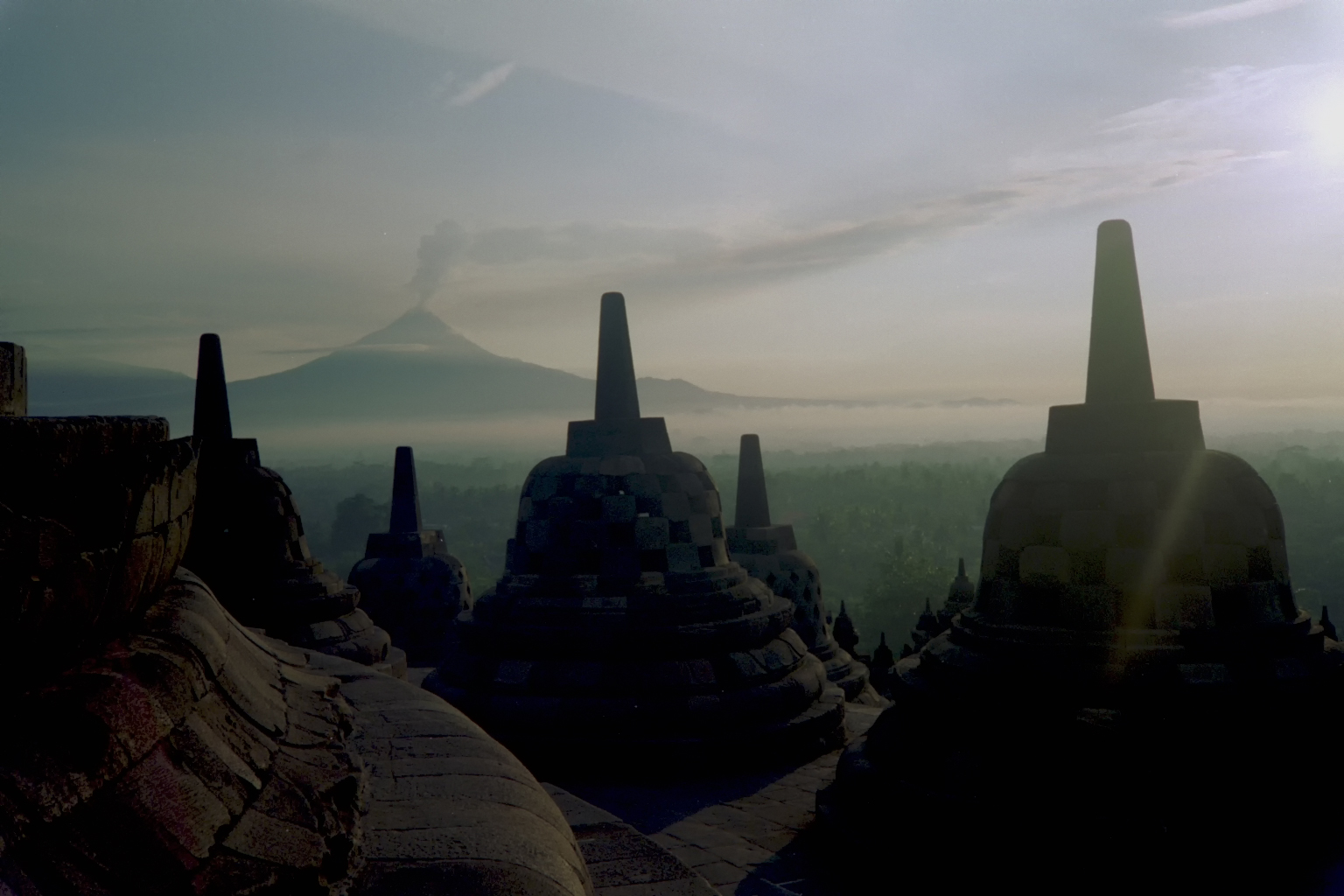
View of Merapi from Borobudur in nearby Magelang (2006)

On 3 November pyroclastic flows travelled up to 10 km (6.2 mi) away from the summit, forcing the government to evacuate people from within the refugee camps set up earlier to accommodate those already dislocated by the volcano. A mid-day report from CVGHM on 3 November stated that 38 pyroclastic flows occurred during the first 12 hours of the day. An observer from the Kaliurang post saw 19 of those 38 flows travel 4 km (2.5 mi) south. Plumes from the pyroclastic flows rose 1.2 km (0.75 mi), although dense fog made visual observations difficult. Ashfall was noted in some nearby areas.

Eruptions in the afternoon followed a morning eruption that sent hot gas clouds down the volcano's slopes. The volcano spewed clouds of ash and gas 5 km (16,000 ft) into the sky for more than an hour. Wednesday's eruptions were reported to be the largest since the eruptions commenced. Surono announced that he was moving the shelters further from the summit. Speaking on Indonesia's Metro TV network he said, "this is the first time that the eruption has continued for more than an hour, so I decided to move the shelters to 15 km (9.3 mi) away from the summit". The shelters had previously been set up 10 km (6.2 mi) away. Surono added that the energy from the eruption on 3 November was three times greater than that of the first eruption in the previous week. Bambang Ervan, a spokesman from the Transportation Ministry, said an official warning had been issued to all airlines to "use alternative routes for safety reasons due to the volcanic ash."

==== Thursday, 4 November ====
Heavy rain during the night of 3–4 November triggered lahars with mixtures of water and rock debris cascading down the Kuning, Gendol, Woro, Boyong, Krasak and Opak Rivers on the slopes of the volcano. A bridge was destroyed and riverbanks damaged. The eruption at 05:55 was reported as being five times stronger than the initial eruption on 26 October 2010. On 4 November Merapi had been erupting for 24 hours without stopping. Pyroclastic flows of 600 to 800 °C (1,100 to 1,500 °F) spread as far as 11.5 km (7.1 mi) from the crater reaching toward the edge of the then 15 km (9.3 mi) exclusion zone, and lava flowed into the mountain's rivers. Herry Bakti Gumay, Director General of air transportation, stated on 4 November that the warning released to all airlines operating flights into Yogyakarta would not be withdrawn until conditions returned to normal.

==== Friday, 5 November ====
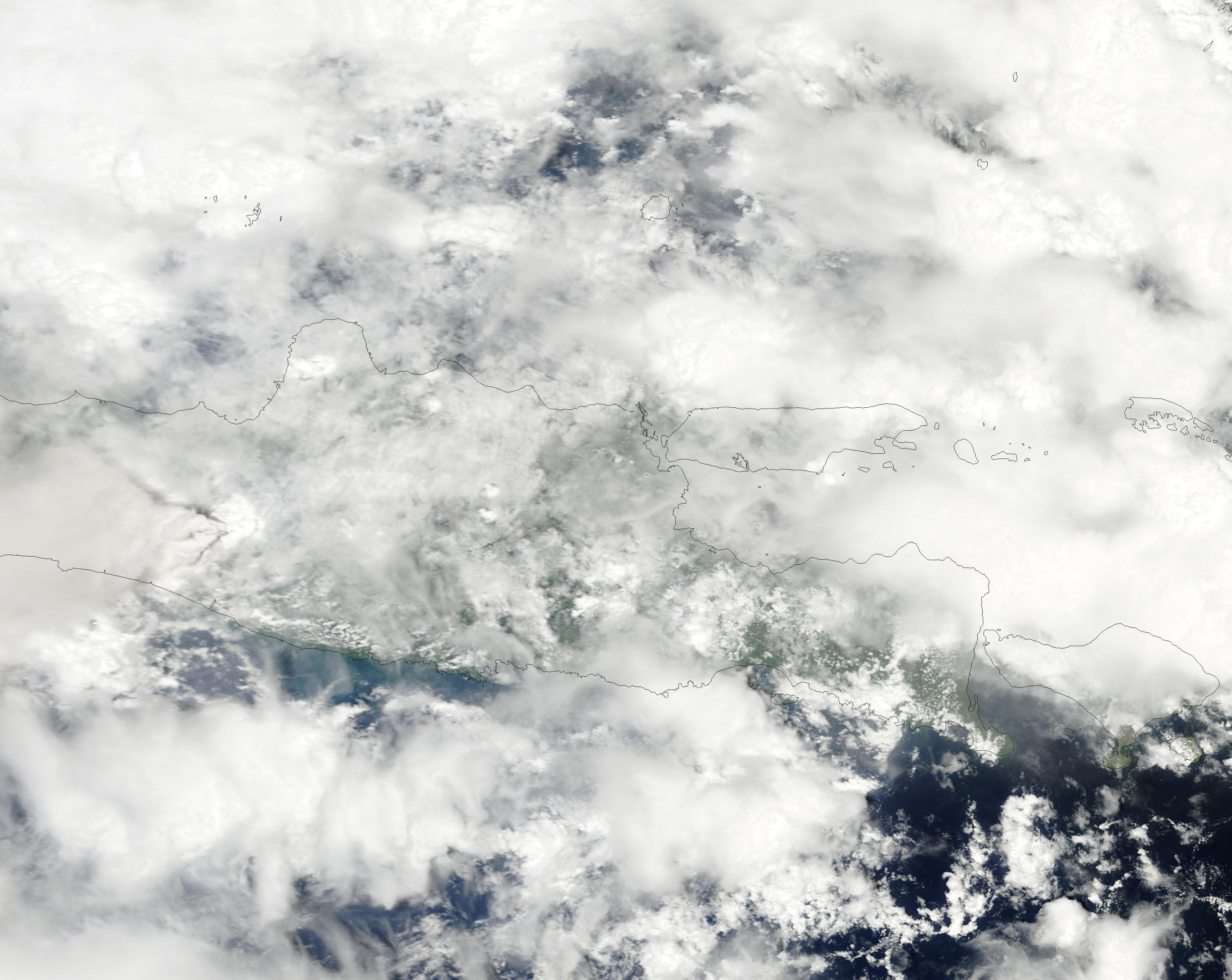
Signs of the eruption at Mount Merapi managed to puncture the persistent cloud cover over Java on 5 November 2010 when this natural-colour image was captured.

Merapi erupted strongly early Friday morning. Volcanic ash fell at Cangkringan district and its surroundings 10 km (6.2 mi) from the crater. Due to continuous large eruptions, the BNPB extended the safety zone to a radius of 20 km (12 mi) and Yogyakarta's airport was closed again for 3 hours in the morning. Residents who were within 15 km (9.3 mi) of the summit were asked to leave and seek a safer place. Volcanologists reported the eruptions on Friday 5 November to be the biggest since the 1870s and officials announced by loudspeaker that the mountain's danger zone had been expanded to 20 km (12 mi) from the crater. Bronggang, a village 15 km (9.3 mi) from the crater saw its streets blanketed by ash up to 30 cm (12 in) deep. By this point, more than 100,000 people had been evacuated and the scientists monitoring the events were withdrawn from their posts to a safer distance. The Australian Bureau of Meteorology, Volcanic Ash Advisory Center (VAAC) issued an ongoing code red Aviation Volcanic Ash Advisory and reported MTSAT-2 satellite image-derived information indicating a volcanic ash plume to (55,000 ft (17,000 m) – FL550), extending 190 nmi (350 km) to the west and southwest of the mountain.

==== Saturday, 6 November ====
The Center for Volcanology and Geological Hazard Mitigation observation outposts reported high intensity ash falls on the slopes of Mt Merapi. At 23:51 a flash of smoke, hot air winds and flames as high as 3 km (1.9 mi) occurred to the west, north and to the east. The day's volcanic activity was high, with sequential hot ash clouds erupting from the mountain. The alert level for the remained at level 4 and the official exclusion zone was a radius 20 km (12 mi) from the summit of Mount Merapi.

==== Sunday, 7 November ====
On Sunday, 7 November President of Indonesia Susilo Bambang Yudhoyono opened a limited cabinet meeting at Gedung Agung, the presidential residence in Yogyakarta located 30 kilometres south of the volcano to address the emergency response to the eruptions of Mount Merapi. At the meeting he reaffirmed his support of the Badan Koordinasi Nasional Penanganan Bencana (Indonesian Disaster Management Office) and their administration and control of the disaster response. At 03:02 hot ash clouds flowed in the direction of the Gendol and Woro rivers. Volcanic earthquake and hot ash cloud events were reported to have increased from the previous day. The Jakarta Globe reported that Merapi continued to belch out deadly pyroclastic flows and clouds of superheated ash and gases. At least 135 people had died on its slopes over the previous two weeks, and authorities were still struggling on Sunday to help those injured from Friday's massive eruption. Police stationed on the slopes complained that they were having considerable difficulties stopping people entering the exclusion zone and putting their lives at risk on the mountains slopes.

==== Monday, 8 November ====
Department of Air Transport's Director General Herry Bakti announced on 8 November that flights in and out of Soekarno-Hatta International Airport in Jakarta had returned to normal. Government vulcanologist Surono said gas and ash soared 4 km (13,000 ft) into the air on Monday as the volcano continued to erupt, "Merapi hasn't stopped erupting since 3 November. It's been fluctuating but tends to be in the high intensity range."

==== Tuesday, 9 November ====
The eruption that began on Friday continued for another day with less intensity as more bodies were retrieved from villages destroyed by pyroclastic flows.

On 9 November BNPB announced that they considered the eruptive activities of 2010 to have exceeded the activities of the mountains eruption in 1872. Based on historical records, the eruption of Merapi in 1872 was recorded for 120 hours, while the eruption of 2010 had already presented five days of relentless activity since Thursday 4 November and up until 8 November had erupted for more than 120 hours or more without pause. Subandriyo, head of the Volcano Investigation and Technology Development Institution (Balai Penyelidikan dan Pengembangan Teknologi Kegunungapian) (BPPTK) in Yogyakarta revealed that hot ash clouds during the eruptions of 138 years ago had a maximum reach of only 11–12 km (36,000–39,000 ft), whilst the current eruptions were reaching 14.5 km (48,000 ft). The Center for Volcanology and Geological Hazard Mitigation (PVMBG) Geological Agency, head officer, Dr Surono announced on 9 November that during the hours of 06:00 to 12:00 eruptive events were continuing with sequential volcanic earthquakes, tremors, avalanches fast moving clouds were still travelling as far as 4 km (2.5 mi) toward the southwest. Yogyakarta residents and evacuees were reminded that the threat of pyroclastic ash clouds and lahar floods remained. The people of Yogyakarta were also reminded to observe the instructions to remain outside a radius of 20 km (12 mi) from the peak of Merapi.

On 9 November a 5.6 magnitude earthquake was felt in Yogyakarta. Reports by the Bureau of Meteorology Climatology and Geophysics (BMKG), detailed the tectonic earthquake as measuring 5.6 on the Richter scale (SR) at 14:03:27. The epicenter was 125 km (78 mi) south-west of Bantul, precisely at 8.98 south latitude coordinates (LS) and 110.08 east longitude (BT) at a depth of 10 km (6.2 mi). The quake's epicenter was at sea and had no tsunami potential. This type of tectonic earthquake was not sourced from the volcanic activity of Mount Merapi. On the night of 9 November there was a burst of ash reaching up to 1.8 km (5,900 ft) vertically.

==== Wednesday 10 November ====
On 10 November 2010 the eruptive intensity was noticed to subside, despite that the volcano's activity remained high with recurring pyroclastic flows. The exclusion zone was maintained at 20 km (12 mi)

==== Thursday 11 November ====
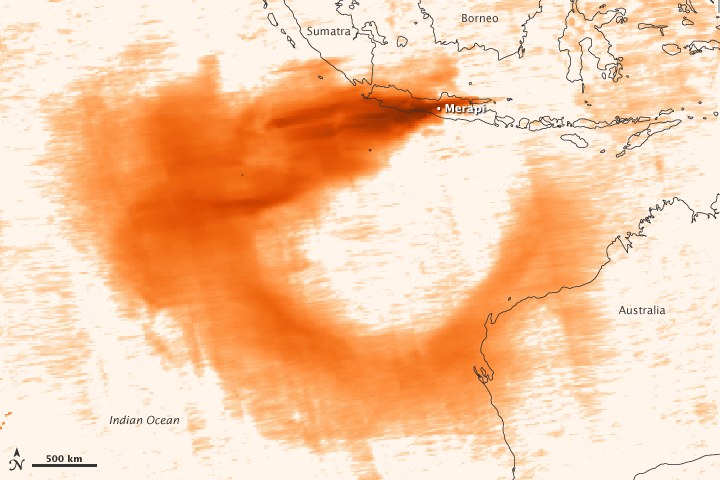
Mount Merapi sulfur dioxide cloud over the Indian Ocean on 11 November 2010

Based on the results of instrumental and visual monitoring by CVGHM (PVMBG), on 11 November activity at Mount Merapi was found to remain high with ash falls and pyroclastic flows extending to 3 km. Under these conditions, the volcanic activity status remained at a dangerous level (level 4), with an ongoing danger from hot air clouds and lava. In the reports of by CVGHM (PVMBG), on 11 November the eruptive activities were noted to be continuing but at a level of decreased intensity. Seventeen avalanches were recorded with one hot ash eruption and one volcanic earthquake. The volcano remained a level 4 alert with a recommendation of a "Caution" level being adopted. Refugees were to remain at a distance of greater than 20 km.

==== Wednesday 17 November ====
Reports by CVGHM (PVMPG) of eruptive activity including hot air clouds, smoke columns, avalanches and volcanic earthquakes continued throughout 16, 17 and 18 November. White and grey smoke was reported emerging from Merapi with smoke columns rising to 1,500 m (4,900 ft). Smoke emissions continued to drift south and southwest of the mountain. Based on monitoring and assessment by CVGHM (PVMPG) the activity Mount Merapi was still considered to be remain at a high level on 18 November. The activity status of the volcano remained at Caution level (Level 4). The threat of immediate danger of eruption continued to be attributed to hot air and ash clouds (awanpanas) with indirect threats attributed to lava ejections.

==== Late November ====
In late November Mount Merapi still remained on alert due to threats in the form of hot clouds and lava. Eruptions were still being reported by PVMPG on 26 November but occurring with decreased intensity to those earlier in the month. The PVMPG still set conditions on the status of Merapi at CAUTION (Level 4). The immediate danger from Mount Merapi continued to be from hot ash clouds eruptions and indirect threats in the form of lava and lahar. The recommended exclusion zones remained at between 5 and 20 km.

The mountain was still erupting on 30 November 2010 and the official alert status remained at level 4.

==== December ====
On Friday 3 December 2010 the head of the National Disaster Management Agency (BNPB), Dr. Syamsul Maarif, M. Si, accompanied by the head of the Centre for Volcanology and Geological Hazard Mitigation CVGHM (PVMBG), Dr. Surono made a joint press release at the BNPB Command Post in Yogyakarta. As of 3 December 2010, at 09:00, the CVGHM (PVMBG) lowered the status of Mount Merapi to the level of Caution Alert (Level III). They clarified that with this alert level the potential of hot ash clouds and projected incandescent material remained. The Geological Agency provided several recommendations including that there would be no community activities in the disaster prone areas and proclaimed an ongoing exclusion zone of 2.5 km (1.6 mi) radius.

== Lava dome deformation ==
During the last week of October 2010, deformation measurements were performed by Electric Distance Measurement (EDM), utilising reflectors mounted around the summit of Mount Merapi. The measurement results indicated a rapidly increasing rate of growth of the lava dome in the buildup to the eruptive events of 25–26 October 2010.

At the end of September 2010, the peak inflation rate of the lava dome at Mount Merapi was measured by EDM at an average growth rate of 6 mm (0.24 in). The subsequent rate of inflation up until 21 October 2010 reached 105 mm (4.1 in) per day. The inflation rate then increased sharply, reaching 420 mm (17 in) per day by 24 October 2010. By 25 October the average grow rate, measured from 6 EDM points over 24–25 October had risen to 500 mm (20 in) per day.

The information gathered at the site indicated that the distension of the mountain's slopes was much more rapid this during the current event than that observed during the 2006 event.

On 26 October the head of the Indonesian Center for Volcanology and Geological Hazard Mitigation, Surono, repeated his earlier statements that the greatest concern was the pressure building behind a massive lava dome that has formed near the tip of the crater. "The energy is building up. ... We hope it will release slowly," he said. "Otherwise we're looking at a potentially huge eruption, bigger than anything we've seen in years". Surono also said that said the distension of the mountain's slopes was much more rapid this time around, indicating a higher-pressure build-up of gas and hence a much more explosive eruption and speculated that Merapi may erupt explosively, as it did in 1930, and not just eject gas as in 2006 eruptions.

By 5 November, following a week of ongoing explosive eruptions, experts monitoring Merapi were reported as being "baffled" as, despite earlier predictions that the eruptions following the initial blast in the prior week would ease pressure building up behind a magma dome, instead the eruptions intensified. An estimated 50 million cubic metres of volcanic material had been released by 5 November. "It was the biggest in at least a century," said Gede Swantika, a state volcanologist, commenting on the eruptions of 5 November as plumes of smoke rose up more than 10,000 m (33,000 ft).

On 17 November Dr Surono, head of the Volcanology and Geological Disaster Management Agency CVGHM (PVMBG) reported that Merapi was still spewing ash and rock. "Most of the initial eruptions threw the ash south toward Sleman in Yogyakarta, but now it's blowing west toward Magelang in Central Java," Surono said. The later eruptions had not been as powerful because of the formation of three new lava vents in addition to the main one in the crater. This helped lessen the intensity of the eruptions. "If you look at the mountain's peak at night, you'll notice three small glowing points," Surono said. "That's actually a good sign because it means the volcano is releasing all its pent-up energy more quickly."

== Casualties ==
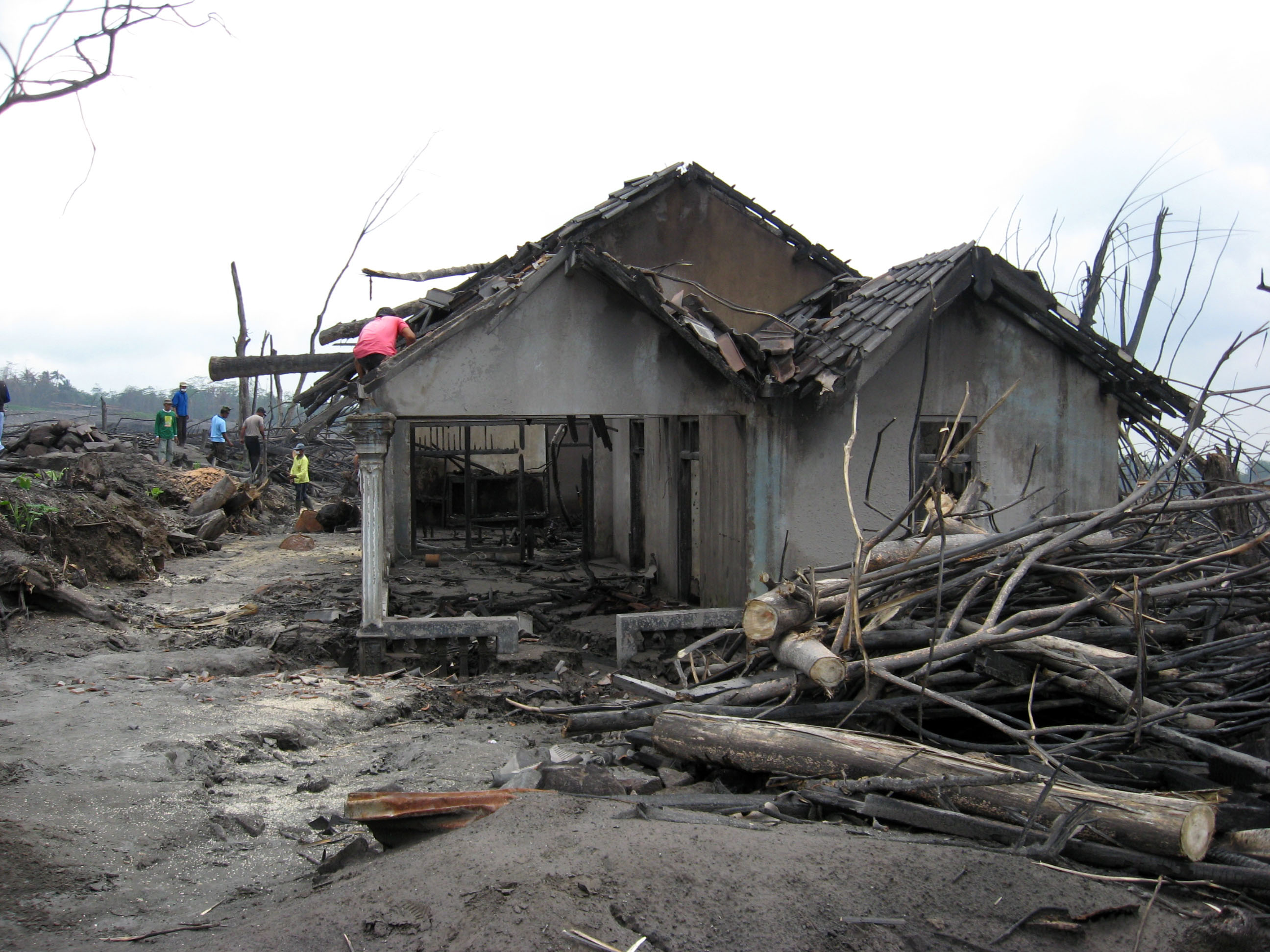
Destroyed house in Cangkringan Village after the eruptions

On 26 October at least 18 people, including a two-month-old baby, were found dead due to burns and respiratory failure caused by hot ashes from the eruption. Thousands were evacuated within a radius of 10 km (6.2 mi) around the slopes of the volcano.

By Wednesday 27 October the death toll had risen to at least 25. The death toll included an elder, Mbah Maridjan (grandfather Marijan), known as the volcano's spiritual gatekeeper, who was found dead at his home approximately 4 km (2.5 mi) from the peak. The Yogyakarta Kraton subsequently confirmed his death. The 10 km (6.2 mi) exclusion zone remained in place at the volcano with evacuation and ongoing search and rescue activities continuing at the site in an attempt to locate further victims of the previous day's eruptions.

Later reports revised the toll upward to 30 persons recorded at Yogyakarta's Dr. Sardjito Hospital with 17 hospitalized, mostly with burns, respiratory problems and other injuries. Earlier on 27 October two of the 28 bodies at the hospital had been identified. Yuniawan Nugroho, an editor with the vivanews.com news portal, was reported to have been killed while conducting reportage on the night of Tuesday 26 October, the other was later identified as Indonesian Tutur Priyanto, a 36-year man working for the Red Cross as a volunteer on the mountain. Tutur Priyanto had been retrieving and escorting residents from the slopes of the mountain. After making multiple trips he returned for a further ascent at 15:00 to assist others to come off the mountain and died during one of the subsequent eruptive events. The Indonesian National Disaster Mitigation Agency stated at 10:00 on morning of 1 November that 38 people had been killed and 69,533 evacuated since Merapi began erupting on 26 October. The victims came from the district of Sleman, Yogyakarta, where 37 people (including 25 men, 12 women, and 1 baby) died. Indonesia's vulcanology agency warned that flights around Yogyakarta may be disrupted.

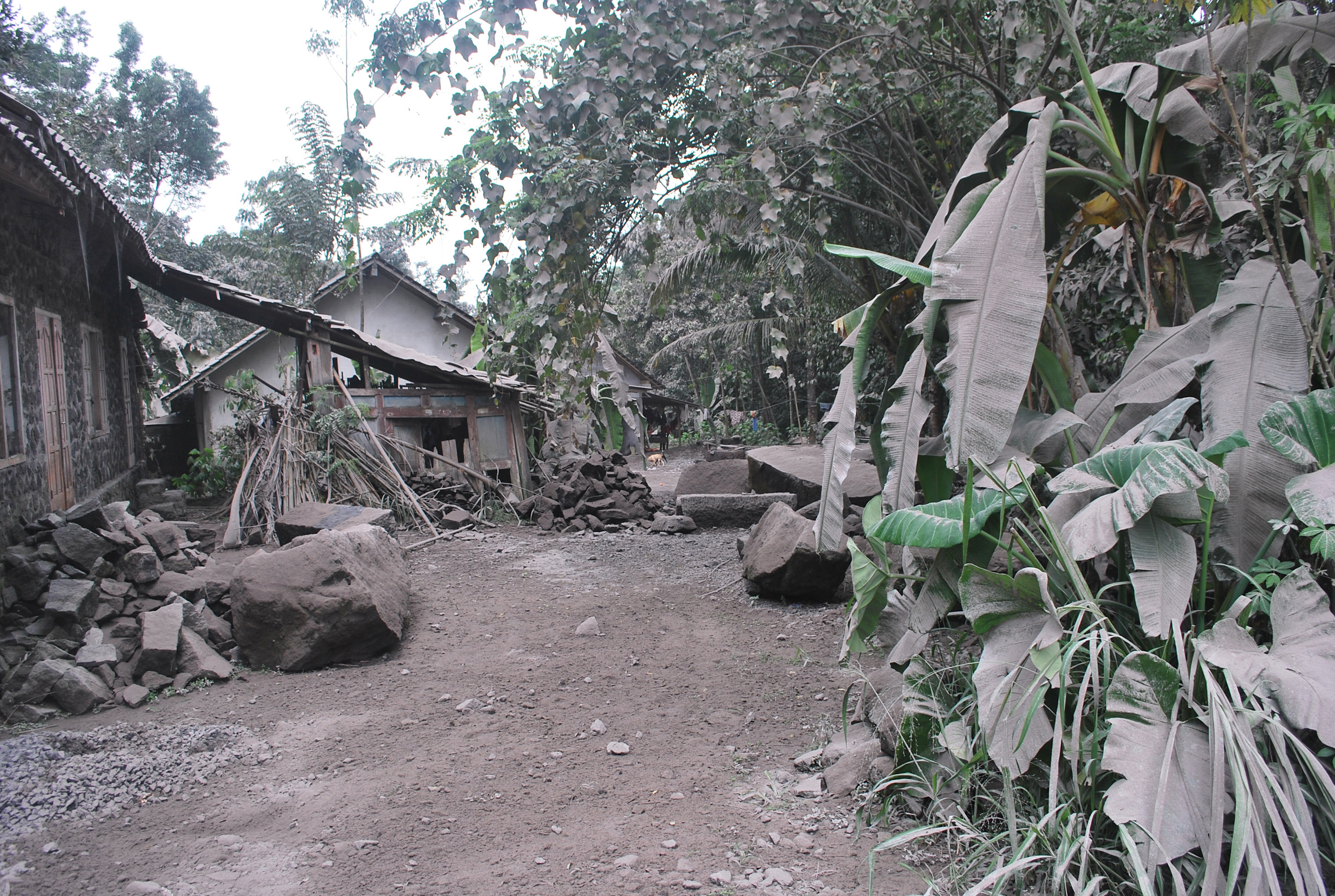
A village near Mount Merapi covered in ash from the volcanic eruption.

By the afternoon of 5 November the Indonesian National Disaster Management Agency was reporting 122 deaths attributable to the Merapi eruptions, primarily residents from Sleman. In the report made at 15:00 the additional victims who died on 5 November contributed as many as 64 people to the total, also mainly residents of Sleman. They died due to exposure to pyroclastic flows from Mount Merapi on Friday at 01:00 in the morning. An additional 151 people were reported as injured and admitted to several hospitals; these included Dr. Sardjito hospital (78), Bethesda Hospital (6), Suradji Tirtonegoro Central Hospital (35), Sleman Regional Hospital (7) and Panti Rapih Hospital (25). Most of the victims died in pyroclastic flows at approximately 8 km (5.0 mi) from the summit. Bronggang, 14.5 km (9.0 mi) from the crater, had been designated as a safe zone. Soldiers joined the rescue operations there, pulling at least 78 bodies from homes and streets blanketed by ash 30 cm (12 in) deep. People there had been killed when hot ash clouds from the crater had travelled down the mountain in pyroclastic flows at speeds of up to 100 km (62 mi) per hour and engulfed their village. Injured were removed on stretchers many with clothes, blankets and mattresses fused to their skin by the heat.

Many of those killed on 5 November were children from Argomulyo village, 18 km (11 mi) from the crater, according to emergency response officials and witnesses. On 5 November full emergency response operations were announced under the single command of Syamsul Muarif, the head of the Indonesian National Agency for Disaster Management (BNPB) in co-operation with the Governor of Yogyakarta, the Governor of Central Java, the Commander of Diponegoro IV Military Region, Central Java police chief and Yogyakarta Special Region police chief.

On the morning of 6 November BNPB provided a victim report. At that time there were 198,488 refugees, 218 people were injured, and 114 people had been recorded as having died. All the victims came from the districts of Sleman, Magelang, Klaten and Boyolali.

The Jakarta Globe reported on 8 November that at least 135 people had died on Merapi's slopes over the previous two weeks, and that authorities were still struggling on Sunday to help those injured from Friday's massive eruption. The bodies of four members of the Indonesian Disaster Response Team were found on the slopes of Mount Merapi on Monday, 8 November. A Search and Rescue (SAR) team discovered the bodies at 06:00 at the Glagaharjo barracks. The building itself had been destroyed by a volcanic mudflow according to the returning retrieval party. The team reported recovering four bodies and seeing one further. Another body in Banjarsari hamlet was found by an Army Special Forces (Kopassus) team. However rescue officials had to retreat as eruptive activity made their further presence on the slopes too dangerous. A hot ash cloud from an eruption forced the SAR group to leave the area carrying only one corpse while the three other bodies were left behind. The Jakarta Globe, quoting the Antara news agency, reported the same day that a total of six bodies of the missing Disaster Response Team members were recovered from the village of Glagaharjo in Sleman, Yogyakarta. The bodies of another two members of the response team, known as Tagana, were yet to be found or recovered. The victims had been missing since Thursday and were presumed dead.

On Monday 8 November Dr. Surono, Head of the Volcanology and Geological Hazard Mitigation (PVMBG) reminded volunteers and rescue workers that eruptive activity was still high. Volunteers were reminded to be aware of the mortal danger presented by the pyroclastic clouds and were encouraged to concentrate on assisting the living at the refugee shelters rather than being concerned about the evacuation of the dead from the mountain. It was made clear by Dr. Surono that only Army Special Forces, specialised Search and Rescue teams, and the Police should be involved in those highly dangerous activities. Nine further victims died from the further eruptions of Mount Merapi at Dr Sardjito hospital in Yogyakata on Monday 9 November bringing the total number of deaths recorded there to 97, with 103 victims still being treated at that hospital.

The death toll was reported to be over 153 by 9 November with at least 320,000 people reported to have been evacuated to emergency shelters. One hospital recorded 12 more bodies brought to its morgue on 9 November, including seven pulled from a destroyed village. Another five people who were being treated for burns died.

The National Disaster Management Agency announced on 11 November that the death toll since the first eruption on 26 October had climbed to 194, three-quarters of those from searing heat blasts during the biggest eruptions and included deaths from respiratory problems, heart attacks and other illnesses related to the eruptions.

The number of people killed by the ongoing eruptions had risen to 275 by 18 November. The National Disaster Management Agency announced the death toll had climbed after more than a dozen victims succumbed to their injuries, the majority of those being from severe burns. Most of the 275 people were reported as being killed by searing gas clouds and from respiratory complications, burns and other illnesses related to the eruptions. Some victims died in road and other accidents during the panicked exodus from the mountain. By 22 November, the death toll had risen to 304 and by 24 November the toll had risen to 324. Syamsul Maarif, head of the National Disaster Mitigation Agency (BNPB) explained that the death toll had risen after a number of victims succumbed to severe burns and more bodies were found on the volcano's slopes.

== Civil impacts ==
President Susilo Bambang Yudhoyono arrived in Yogyakarta on the night Friday, 5 November and had set up his command post at Gedung Agung. Yudhoyono said he had also assigned Agung Laksono, coordinating minister for people's welfare, to coordinate aid from the central government. The military mobilised a brigade to build makeshift hospitals and public kitchens to serve the growing number of displaced. The President also announced that the coordination of disaster mitigation for the eruption had been tasked to Syamsul Maarif, the head of the National Disaster Mitigation Agency (BNPB). "Looking at the scale and the continuity of the disaster, I decided that the command is now in the hand of the BNPB head with the help of the Yogyakarta and Central Java governors, the Diponegoro military commander and the heads of the police of Central Java and Yogyakarta," he said, adding that the decision was effective as of Friday.

The alert level for the volcano remained at level 4. On 6 November the official exclusion zone was at radius 20 km (12 mi) from the summit of Mount Merapi. Refugee camps that were previously located within a radius of 15 km (9.3 mi) were re-located to secure locations placing an added burden upon logistics and the delivery of basic needs to the people displaced by the evacuations.

By 7 November due to the eruptions and ash falls in the surrounding area of Central Java, the price of a number of vegetables, such as potatoes and water spinach were reported as increasing. Schools were reported closed up to 120 km (75 mi) west of Yogyakarta.

On 8 November upon a directive from both the President and the Prime Minister of the United Arab Emirates the UAE Red Crescent Authority (Red Cross) responded to appeals by Indonesian officials to assist the Yogyakarta population and is providing a field hospital. According to head of medical services at the UAE Interior Ministry Brig. Salem Al-Junaibi is to be staffed by medical and administrative workers and will be set up within the 'safe zone' more than 20 km from the mountain.

Acute respiratory infection, hypertension, and headache were affecting Mount Merapi eruption survivors. "The displaced people are so vulnerable to these diseases," an official of the Health Ministry Supriyantoro stated on Sunday, 7 November. Refugees received medical treatment at clinics set up inside the refugee shelters with serious cases despatched to local hospitals, the Mount Merapi refugees were not required to pay for medical treatment. 45 hospitals and more than 100 health centers were serving Mount Merapi eruption victims in the districts of Sleman, Klaten, Magelang and Boyolali, he said. "But we (health workers) have difficulties in taking care of the refugees' health problems because many moved from one refugee shelter to another." Asked about the medical supplies for the refugees, especially those with serious burns, he said the supplies were not sufficient, but situation could still be handled and overcome.

On Tuesday, 9 November, Indonesian Red Cross chairman Jusuf Kalla encouraged the development of a disaster preparedness curriculum to assist in dealing with natural disasters ("Harus ada kurikulum kebencanaan") through an ongoing training and education.

320,000 people were reported to have been evacuated to emergency shelters by 9 November following the widening of the evacuation zone the previous week. A number of children remained separated from their parents due to the chaos surrounding the mass exodus of refugees fleeing from the mountain slopes and the refugees were living in cramped temporary shelters after being ordered to evacuate from a 20-kilometre "danger zone" around Mount Merapi. "We are concerned about children who are yet to be united with their parents," said Makbul Mubarak, a coordinator for volunteers who are trying to reunite separated families.

A Merapi Response Radio 100.2 FM "talk show" presented the Yogyakarta Governor, Sri Sultan Hamengkubuwono X, the head of the BNPB, Dr. Syamsul Maarif, and chief of the PVMBG, Dr. Surono on evening of 11 November. A media center and a call center were also established to attempt to assist in bridging an information gap related to information on current conditions and the management of victims of Merapi. BNPB stated that multiple issues and news reports in the media and are misleading and a number of irresponsible SMS's were circulating. by that time more than 350,000 people had been evacuated to cramped emergency shelters. Thousands of evacuees were in limbo in refugee camps, posing a real threat to their mental health. Supriyantoro, the Health Ministry's director general for medical services, said his office had noted that a number of the evacuees were beginning to exhibit symptoms of mild mental health problems, which he said was not surprising, given the current situation. Preliminary findings at the time showed at least eight people were suffering from serious depression and anxiety, while one man had committed suicide, reportedly due to stress.

On Thursday, 18 November the Australian Government's Department of Foreign Affairs and Trade issued a second update to their 11 November travel advisory bulletin acknowledging the announcement by Indonesian authorities on 15 November scaling back the 20 kilometre exclusion zone in some of the regions around Mount Merapi. The exclusion zone had been reduced to 15 km (9.3 mi) in the District (Kabupaten) of Magelang and to 10 km (6.2 mi) in the Districts of Klaten and Boyolali. The exclusion zone in the District of Sleman, towards the city of Yogyakarta, remained at 20 km (12 mi). The exclusion zone did not include the metropolitan areas of Yogyakarta or Adisucipto International Airport However the Indonesian Government advised that Adisucipto International Airport would be closed until at least 20 November. Other airports in Java had been subject to periodic closure due to volcanic activity at Mount Merapi. The travel bulletin further advised that eruptions or any widening of the Indonesian Government's exclusion zone would likely cause major disruption to services in Yogyakarta and surrounding areas. At the time the advisory was issued residents of Yogyakarta were still able to leave the city by road and rail, however any possible widening of the exclusion zone was considered to have the potential to affect the availability of departure options. It was noted that there had been a deterioration in air quality in Yogyakarta from ash falling on the city. It was cautioned that volcanic ash could cause breathing difficulties, particularly for people with chronic respiratory ailments such as asthma, emphysema, or bronchitis.

The Indonesian Social Welfare Minister, Salim Segaf Al-Jufri announced on 19 November that the government planned to end the emergency response period for the Mount Merapi eruption disaster on 24 November. "We will maintain the emergency response period until 24 November. Whether the period will be extended or not will depend on the situation." Speaking to newsmen in Magelang district, he said the Mt Merapi evacuees could return home after the volcano's "beware" status had been lowered. The social welfare ministry had distributed relief aid packages containing staple food and blankets during the emergency response period. After the end of the emergency response period, the National Disaster Management Agency (BNPB) planned to begin implementing the reconstruction and rehabilitation programs for Mt Merapi victims. By mid November the eruptions had damaged 867 hectares of forest land on the volcano's slopes in Sleman District, Yogyakarta, with material losses estimated at Rp33 billion. The damaged areas included the Merapi National Park, community forests and the farms and plantations of the local people. Magelang's district administration decided to extend the emergency period, scheduled to end on 24 November, for a further period of 2 weeks until 9 December as Merapi's alert status still remained at the highest level in late November 2010. Heri Prawoto, the head of the district's Disaster Management Office was reported as saying that "there is still the possibility that some areas in Magelang will be impacted by volcanic debris".

Yogyakarta's Disaster Management Agency reported in late November that there were about 500 reported cases of eruption survivors in Sleman district suffering from minor to severe psychological problems, and about 300 cases in Magelang.

== Volcanic ash plume ==
=== Air travel disruption ===
The eruptions and subsequent volcanic ash plumes caused extensive disruption to aviation movements across central and western Java in early November. Some flights to and from Bandung, Jakarta and Solo were affected and multiple international and domestic airlines suspended operations to and from those cities. Yogyakarta's Adisucipto International Airport was closed on multiple occasions in early November due to limited visibility and ash falls upon the runway, taxiway and terminal aprons. Adisucipto International Airport is the third busiest airport on the island of Java and lies approximately 13.5 nmi (15.5 mi; 25.0 km) to the south of Merapi. An Airbus A330-300 flight operated for Garuda Indonesia as a Hajj pilgrimage from Solo's Adisumarmo International Airport 19 nmi (22 mi; 35 km) east of Merapi and travelling to Batam en route to Jeddah (Saudi Arabia) was reported to have suffered from ash related engine damage on 28 October. It was however later reported to have suffered from blade tip rubbing and was not apparently damaged by volcanic ash ingestion.

On 3 November Garuda Indonesia diverted its embarkation point for Hajj pilgrims from Solo to Surabaya to keep flights from being delayed by volcanic ash from the erupting Mount Merapi.

On 4 November Herry Bakti Gumay, Director General of air transportation, stated that the warning released to all airlines operating flights into Yogyakarta would not withdraw warning until conditions returned to normal. Transportation Minister Freddy Numberi, speaking in Jakarta, said he had instructed airlines to direct all flights crossing Java to the north or south to avoid Merapi. "We have already prepared alternative routes for all flights," he said. "It may cost more and use up more fuel, but safety comes first."

On 5 November at 05:27 (UTC) the Australian government Bureau of Meteorology (VAAC) issued an ongoing code red Aviation Volcanic Ash Advisory and reported satellite image (MTSAT-2) derived information indicating a volcanic ash plume to FL550 OBS extending 190 nmi (350 km) to the west and southwest of the mountain. Yogyakarta's Adisucipto International Airport (JOG) was closed and flights were diverted to Solo's Adisumarmo International Airport (SOC) to the east of Mount Merapi.

On 6 November at 11:07(UTC) the Australian government Bureau of Meteorology (VAAC) issued an ongoing code red Aviation Volcanic Ash Advisory and reported satellite image (MTSAT-2) derived information indicating a volcanic ash plume to FL550 OBS extending 190 nautical miles to the west of the mountain. At Jakarta's Soekarno-Hatta Airport (CGK) airlines cancelled 36 flights on 6 November over concerns about volcanic ash. The Indonesian Disaster Management Office reported that volcanic ash from Merapi was falling in Jakarta and some nearby areas such as Bogor and Puncak on Saturday the night of 6 November but only in light falls.

By 7 November the Aviation Volcanic Ash Advisory issued from Darwin Australia reported the volcanic ash plume "to FL250 OBS extending 100 nmi [190 km] to the west". Fights to cities close to Merapi including Yogyakarta, Solo and Bandung were affected by concerns of ash in the air around the mountain and of that blowing from the mountains ash plume toward the west and south west of Merapi. The closure of smaller airports near the volcano delayed the arrival of burn cream and ventilators for those whose skin and lungs have been damaged by the ash, heat and volcanic gases. The VAAC code red status was issued again for that day describing an ash plume extending westward to 120 nmi (220 km), the last observations being made at 08:30 (UTC) 14:30 local time at Yogyakarta.

At Jakarta's Soekarno-Hatta Airport (CGK) airlines canceled 50 flights on Sunday, 7 November in addition to 36 flights cancelled on 6 November over concerns about volcanic ash. A number of international airlines halted flights to the capital however some carriers resumed some flights on Sunday 7 November. Jakarta's Soekarno-Hatta airport normally handles around 900 flights per day and a spokesman for Soekarno-Hatta Airport, confirmed that the capital's airport remained fully open. Flag-carrier Garuda Indonesia and Lion Air still operated international flights out of Jakarta's Soekarno-Hatta airport. Garuda Indonesia spokesman Pujobroto told news portal kompas.com, "There has been no notice to airman so far from the aviation authorities which says the airport is affected by the volcanic ash. Therefore Garuda continues its activities."
Domestic flights to and from Yogyakarta were cancelled by Garuda Indonesia: 15 flights (8 departure / 7 arrival), Lion Air: 4 flights (3 departure / 1 arrival), Batavia Air: 2 flights (1 departure / 1 arrival). AirAsia (Malaysia) had previously suspended flights into Yogyakarta and Solo and SilkAir (Singapore) had suspended their operations into Solo. Airport operations at Yogyakarta's Adisucipto airport had already been closed or suspended on a number of occasions due to concerns from ash fall and limited visibility. Garuda and Sriwijaya Air canceled all flights to Yogyakarta until 9 November due to the ash plume. Pujobroto, vice president of corporate communications, Garuda Indonesia announced that with flight conditions between Yogyakarta and Solo also still uncertain, flights from Yogyakarta will not be diverted to Solo and reiterated that there had not been any official declaration that Soekarno Hatta airport had been affected by Merapi's volcanic ashes and nor was it closed down. "Garuda will still continue its services for domestic and international flights to and from Soekarno Hatta airport."

Department of Air Transport's Director General Herry Bakti announced on 8 November that flights in and out of Soekarno-Hatta International Airport in Jakarta had returned to normal.

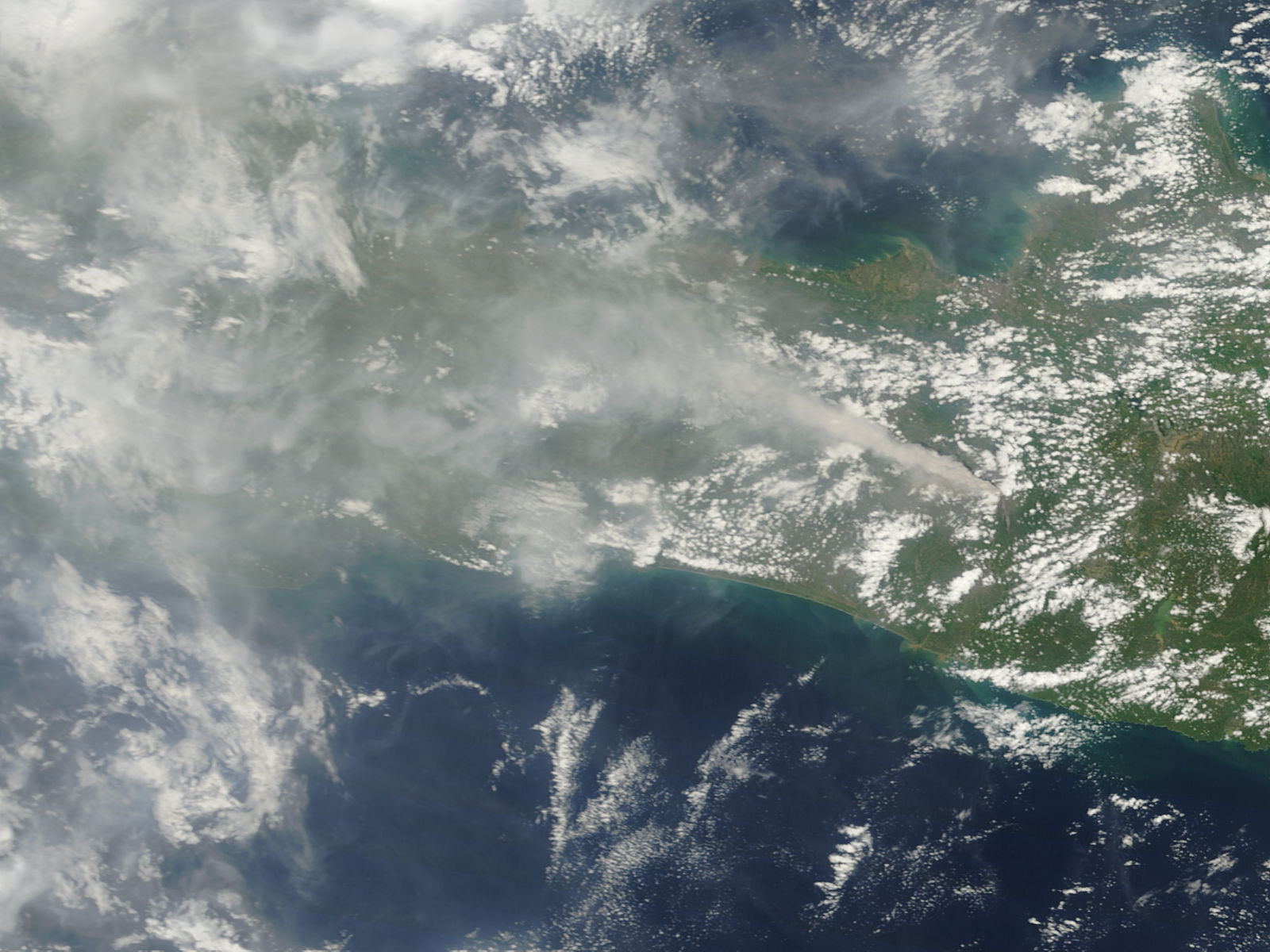
The Moderate Resolution Imaging Spectroradiometer (MODIS) on NASA's Terra satellite captured this image of the Merapi ash plume heading west on 10 November 2010. The dark brown streak down the southern face of the volcano is ash and other volcanic material deposited by a pyroclastic flow or lahar.

On Thursday 11 November, ash continued to spread over western Java and was falling just short of Jakarta, according to the Volcanic Ash Advisory Center in Darwin, Australia. Flight activity at Jakarta's airport was normal, and Yogyakarta's airport was closed until Monday 15 November. On the morning of 11 November, the volcano was ejecting ash 1,000 m (3,300 ft) into the air. High-level clouds were observed over the Indian Ocean and were thought to be volcanic ash-bearing. A code-red aviation alert was continued, and at 16:41 a volcanic ash plume was seen to be extending to 25,000 ft (7,600 m), FL250 extending to 150 nmi (280 km) to the west. It had been observed earlier that day travelling 150 nautical miles to the north west as it had the day prior. The volcano was observed on 4–8 November by the Ozone Monitoring Instrument (OMI) on NASA's Aura spacecraft and imagery indicated that a sulfur dioxide plume had been released into the upper troposphere. Sulfur dioxide is a colorless gas that can harm human health and cool earth's climate. Besides elevating the risk of acid rain, the ions can also react to form particles that reflect sunlight. On 9 November 2010, the Volcanic Ash Advisory Centre in Darwin, Australia, also reported a sulfur-dioxide cloud over the Indian Ocean between 12,000 and 15,000 m (39,000 and 49,000 ft), in the upper troposphere.

An Australian Government Department of Foreign Affairs travel advisory bulletin issued on 18 November noted that the exclusion zone in place at that time did not include the metropolitan areas of Yogyakarta or Adisucipto International Airport. The Indonesian Government had advised that Adisucipto International Airport would be closed until at least 20 November whilst other airports in Java had been subject to periodic closure due to volcanic activity at Mount Merapi. It was further noted that there had been a deterioration in air quality in Yogyakarta from ash falling on the city. It was cautioned that volcanic ash could cause breathing difficulties, particularly for people with chronic respiratory ailments such as asthma, emphysema, or bronchitis with a further caution that volcanic activity at Mount Merapi was continuing and could lead to further disruptions to international and domestic flights to locations throughout Indonesia. Acting upon information derived from MSTAT imagery on 19 November VAAC, Darwin notified of an ash plume observed at a height of 15,000 ft( 4,600 m- F150), extending 40 nmi (74 km) to the west of the mountain. The (VAAC) Aviation Volcanic Ash Advisory warning of code red was applied in the 10:50 (UTC) advisory, elevated from a code orange issued earlier at 06:36 (UTC).

=== Effect on Borobudur ===
Borobudur, an 8th-century Buddhist temple and one of the world's largest Buddhist monuments, was heavily affected by the eruption in early November 2010. Volcanic ash from Mount Merapi fell on the temple complex, which is approximately 28 km (17 mi) west-southwest of the crater. A layer of ash up to 2.5 cm (1 in) thick fell on the temple statues during the eruption of 3–5 November, also killing nearby vegetation, with experts fearing that the acidic ash might damage the historic site. The temple complex was closed from 5 November to the 9th to clean up the ashfall.

Borobudur was again "temporarily closed for tourists" from the morning of 10 November, due to the continuing fall of volcanic ash.

== International reactions ==
On 29 October the Ministry of Foreign Affairs said that it was not accepting foreign aid as an assessment of needs was still being made. On Friday 30 October, Teuku Faizasyah, a presidential spokesman, announced; "If they (foreign donors) want to provide help, then the government will facilitate the channelling of those funds," He said the government had not yet confirmed how the foreign aid could be transferred. "We appreciate their statements of willingness to provide assistance".

On the same date the European Commission announced that it was offering 1.5 million euros to help the victims of the Mount Merapi volcano and the earthquake and tsunami that struck the remote Mentawai islands off the coast of Indonesian Sumatra on Monday 25 October 2010. The funds were to be provided to assist the 65,000 people in Mentawai and at least 22,000 people in Yogyakarta in Central Java. "Humanitarian partners will use these funds to provide water and sanitation to victims; access to primary health care and disease control; food and nonfood items; emergency telecommunications, emergency shelter; psychological support; logistics and will mainstream disaster preparedness" according to a European Commission announcement.

The Australian government made announcements in Jakarta pledging almost $1 million in aid. Paul Robilliard, charge d'affaires at the Australian Embassy in Jakarta, said his government was also prepared to offer more support if needed, the money being intended primarily for the relief effort in the Mentawai Islands. Parts of the Australian funding is to be in the form of donations to Nahdlatul Ulama and Muhammadiyah, Indonesia's biggest Islamic organizations, as well as the Indonesian Red Cross (PMI). All three organizations are involved in relief efforts in the Mentawai Islands and around Merapi. On 2 November the Australian government announced additional funding of $1.1 million assistance. This was to include support for health and psycho-social programs for affected communities as well as longer term emergency preparedness activities and assistance to the Indonesian community organisations Muhammadiyah and Nahdlatul Ulama to help local communities recover following the eruption and the Indonesian Red Cross for humanitarian assistance in the Mentawai Islands and the Mount Merapi area. An AusAID officer was posted to work with local assessment teams near Mount Merapi. The additional aid was for humanitarian assistance in both the Mentawai Islands and the Mount Merapi area and the Australian government stated it stood ready to assist further if Indonesia required more support. In response. The Government of Indonesia accepted the offer from the Australian Government.

The US ambassador Scot Marciel announced his governments desire to grant US$2 million toward the humanitarian relief efforts in Indonesia. President Barack Obama said in a statement: "Michelle and I are deeply saddened by the loss of life, injuries, and damage that have occurred as a result of the recent earthquake and tsunami in West Sumatra. At the same time, I am heartened and encouraged by the remarkable resiliency of the Indonesian people and the commitment of their Government to rapidly assist the victims. As a friend of Indonesia, the United States stands ready to help in any way. Meanwhile, our thoughts and prayers are with the Indonesian people and all those affected by this tragedy." Taiwan donated US$300,000 to finance reconstruction efforts in disaster-hit regions in Indonesia. The funds, along with 1,000 blankets, 7,000 clothes, 25,255 pairs of shoes, and 10,000 pairs of footwear was to be distributed among victims of natural disasters in stages, the Taipei Economic and Trade Office (TETO) announced in a press release on Monday 15 November 2010. The donation was to be channeled through the Indonesian natural disaster mitigation board. The United Arab Emirates President Sheikh Khalifa bin Zayed Al Nahyan, Vice President, Prime Minister of UAE and Emir of Dubai Sheikh Mohammed bin Rashid Al Maktoum, Sheikh Hamdan Bin Zayed Al-Nahyan, the Ruler's Representative in the Western Region and Chairman of the Red Crescent Authority announced the provision of a Field hospital to be provided with medical and administrative staff to assist the victims of the Merapi eruptions.

Other countries, including Canada, Japan, Pakistan, Portugal offered condolences.

Philippine Foreign Affairs Secretary Alberto G. Romulo, who was in Hanoi, Vietnam to attend the 17th ASEAN Summit, directed his department to get ready to provide Indonesia with assistance. The embassy in Jakarta said that "The (Philippines) Embassy...stands ready to provide assistance, if needed," and adding all Filipinos in Indonesia are safe. No aid was ever sent.

Malaysian Prime Minister Datuk Seri Najib Tun Abdul Razak made a personal contribution worth Rp1 billion (RM347,000) to help alleviate the suffering of victims of the Merapi volcano disaster. The aid included infant milk, biscuits, blankets and sarongs and personal hygiene items. When handing over the contribution to the Sultan of Yogyakarta, Defence Minister Datuk Seri Dr Ahmad Zahid Hamidi said PM Najib sympathised with the plight of the victims of the disaster.

== See also ==
- List of volcanoes in Indonesia
- List of volcanic eruptions by death toll
