= Maridjan =

Maridjan is a name. Notable people with the name include:

- Mbah Maridjan (1927?–2010), spiritual guardian of the Indonesian volcano Mount Merapi
- Sekarmadji Maridjan Kartosoewirjo (1905–1962), Indonesian Islamic mystic
