= Surono =

Indonesian volcanologist

- Born: July 8, 1955 (age 71); Indonesia
- Other name: Mbah Rono
- Education: Bandung Institute of Technology, Grenoble University, University of Savoy
- Known for: Volcanic hazard mitigation and monitoring in Indonesia
- Awards: Satyalancana Kebaktian Sosial, Bintang Jasa Utama

Surono (born July 8, 1955) also known as Mbah Rono (Javanese for Grandfather Rono), is an Indonesian geophysicist and volcanologist. In 2005 he became the Head of the Indonesian Center of Volcanology and Geological Hazard Mitigation ("Pusat Vulkanologi dan Mitigasi Bencana Geologi"). He also used to be the Head of the Indonesian Geological Agency of the Ministry of Energy and Mineral Resources.

After graduating from the Bandung Institute of Technology in 1982 with a bachelor's degree in physics, he studied at Grenoble University in France. He graduated from the University of Savoy, Chambéry in 1993 with a doctorate degree in geophysics.

He became the Head of Physical Volcanology at the Volcano Analysis Division Volcanological Survey in Indonesia in 1993. In 2001, he became the head of the Geological Hazard Mitigation Division Volcanology and Geological Hazard Mitigation. In 2005, he was appointed as the director of the Centre for Volcanology and Geological Hazard Mitigation (PVMBG), and in 2014, he became the Head of the Indonesian Geological Agency.

== International Publications ==
- Lesage, P., Surono, 1995. Seismic precursors of the February 10, 1990 eruption of Kelut volcano, Java. Journal of Volcanology and Geothermal Research, 65(135-146).
- Surono, Jousset, P., Pallister, J., Boichu, M., Buongiorno, M.F., Budisantoso, A., Costa, F., Andreastuti, S., Prata, F., Schneider, D., Clarisse, L., Humaida, H., Sumarti, S., Bignami, C., Griswold, J., Carn, S., Oppenheimer, C., Lavigne, F., 2012. The 2010 explosive eruption of Java's Merapi volcano—A ‘100-year’ event. Journal of Volcanology and Geothermal Research, 241-242(121-135).
- Syahbana, D. K., Caudron, C., Jousset, P., Lecocq, T., Camelbeeck, T., Bernard, A., Surono, 2014. Fluid dynamics inside a “wet” volcano inferred from the complex frequencies of long-period (LP) events: An example from Papandayan volcano, West Java, Indonesia, during the 2011 seismic unrest. Journal of Volcanology and Geothermal Research, 280(76-89).
