= Mbah Maridjan =

Indonesian spiritual guardian (1927–2010)

- Born: 5 February 1927; Dukuh Kinahrejo, Umbulharjo Village, Cangkringan, Sleman, Yogyakarta Sultanate, Dutch East Indies
- Died: 26 October 2010 (aged 83); Sleman, Special Region of Yogyakarta, Indonesia
- Cause of death: Killed by the 2010 eruption of Mount Merapi
- Occupation: Juru kunci (gatekeeper) of Mount Merapi
- Title: Mas Penewu Surakso Hargo

Mas Penewu Surakso Hargo, better known as Mbah Maridjan ("Grandfather Maridjan") (5 February 1927? – 26 October 2010) was the spiritual guardian or "gatekeeper" of the Indonesian volcano Mount Merapi. His birthplace was in the mountainside hamlet (Javanese language-dukuh) of Kinahrejo, Umbulharjo Village, Cangkringan District, of the Sleman Regency, on the island of Java in Indonesia.

He was killed at the age of 83 by a pyroclastic flow that destroyed his home in the village of Kinahrejo during the 2010 eruption of Mount Merapi.

== Life ==
Maridjan was the son of the previous guardian, Mbah Hargo. He was appointed to the palace staff of the Sultan of Yogyakarta, Sri Sultan Hamengkubuwono IX, in 1970 and was given the title of Raden Ngabehi Surokso Hargo. He replaced his father as guardian in 1982.

The spiritual guardian of the mountain is believed by local people to have the power to speak to the spirits of Mount Merapi, which the Javanese consider to be a sacred mountain. Maridjan led ceremonies to appease the spirits of the volcano by presenting them with offerings of rice and flowers in and around the crater. One of his most important duties was the performance of the annual Labuhan sacrificial ceremony dedicated to the spirits of Mount Merapi. A procession from the royal palace on Yogjakarta led by the guardian sacrifices to the volcano spirits a set of ritual offerings including textiles, perfume, incense, money, and, every eight years, a horse saddle. He described his job, for which he was paid $1 a month, as being "to stop lava from flowing down. Let the volcano breathe, but not cough."

Maridjan was known for his dedication and loyalty to the king and became an Indonesian icon. He lived only about 5 kilometres (3.1 mi) from the peak in his home village of Kinahrejo. Many villagers believed that he would be warned in a vision if an eruption was imminent. In May 2006, he refused to leave his village despite a mandatory evacuation order after scientists warned of an imminent eruption. He went with fifty other men to the village mosque when the volcano began to erupt. Following his example, a hundred other families also refused to evacuate. He was badly burned in a subsequent blast and spent five months in hospital after being rescued from his collapsed house. He became a popular hero because he refused to leave his village and his insistence that it was his duty to discharge his responsibility for the welfare of the people. He said that "the people of Kinahrejo feel that it was their destiny to be born to be a fortress to protect the welfare of the kraton (royal palace) and the people of Mataram (central Java)." During an interview in 2006, he said, "Everybody has their duty. Reporter, soldier, police, they have their duty. I also must stand here".

== 2010 Merapi eruption and death ==
Maridjan again refused to evacuate before the 26 October eruption in 2010, telling a friend that he could not leave because he had a responsibility, and that because "my time to die in this place has almost come, I can't leave." Thirteen other people, who were in his home trying to persuade him to leave, were killed along with him when his house was hit by a pyroclastic flow. Only the mosque in his village was left standing. Maridjan's body was found in a praying position; he was thought to have been killed instantly by the 1,000-degree-Celsius (1,830 °F) cloud of gas and ash.

The Yogyakarta Palace subsequently confirmed his death. Gusti Prabukusumo, the brother of Sultan Hamengkubuwono X, said that they had "known long before it happened that Mbah Maridjan would be taken by Merapi. Now that he's gone, we have to choose a new gatekeeper soon". Maridjan was survived by his wife and five children.

In 2012, Maridjan's son Asih Lurah Surakso Sihono was assigned as the new gatekeeper.

== Sources ==
- Casimir, Michael J. (2009). Culture and the Changing Environment: Uncertainty, Cognition, and Risk Management in Cross-Cultural Perspective. Berghahn Books. ISBN 978-1-84545-683-2.
