= Opak River =

Coordinates: 8°01′S 110°17′E

Opak River Sungai Opak, Kali Opak
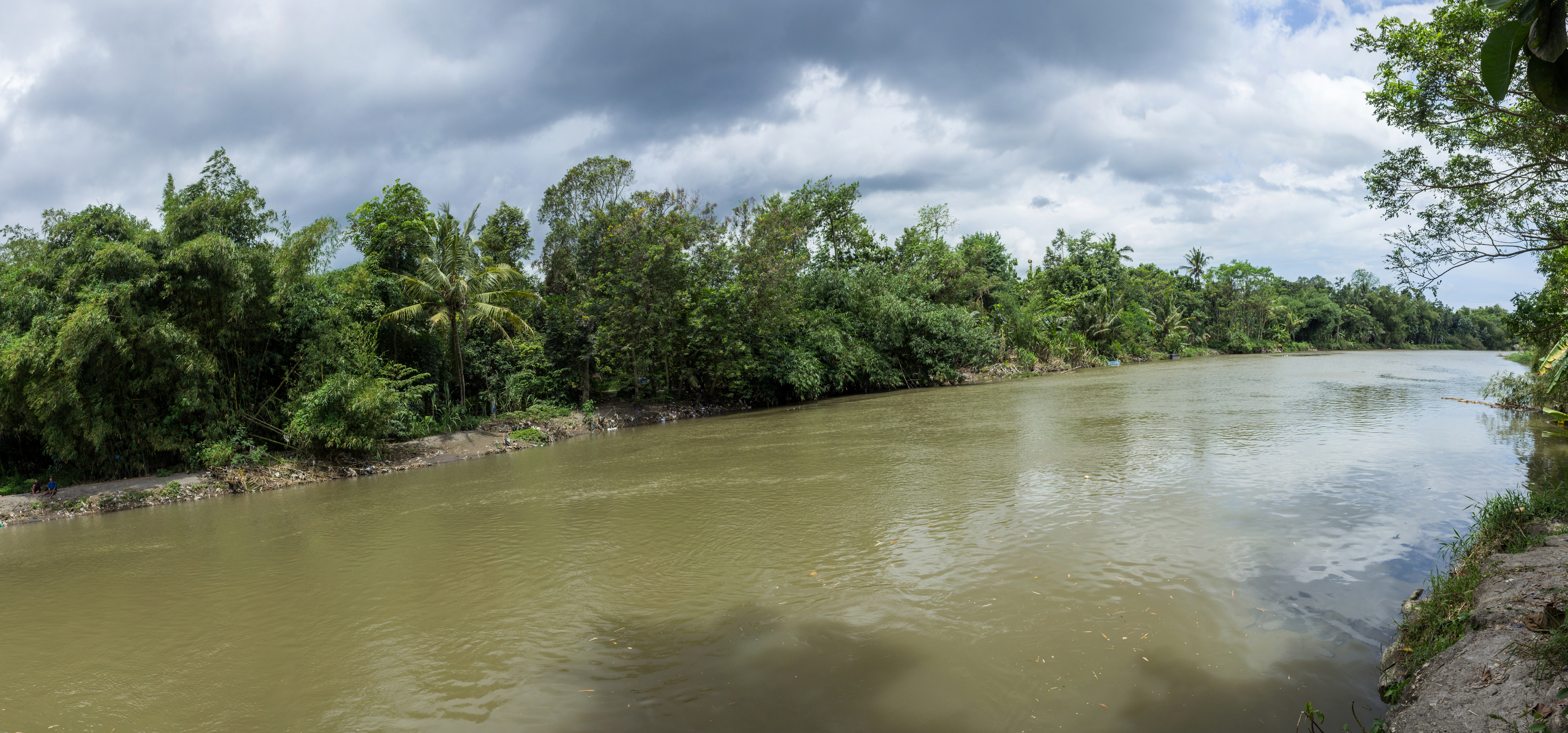
- Opak River as viewed from Jetis, Bantul

- Location of river mouth Opak River (Indonesia)

Location
- Country: Indonesia
- State: Yogyakarta
- Region: Bantul Regency, Sleman Regency

Physical characteristics
- Source: Mount Merapi
- Mouth
  - location: Indian Ocean
- Length: 65 km (40 mi)
- Basin size: 638.89 km^{2} (246.68 sq mi)

Opak River is a river in central south area of Java island, Indonesia.

== Hydrology ==
It flows from its source on the slopes of Mount Merapi in the north, heading southward and passes the west side of 9th-century Prambanan temple compound, located to the east of Yogyakarta and southeast of Kota Gede.

It also passes the historical locations of Plered, Karta, and Imogiri before draining into the Indian Ocean in the southern part of Bantul.

The river runs upon Opak tectonic fault, a major tectonic fault in southern Central Java responsible for major earthquakes in the region..

The river basin that it lies in is significant as the aquifer is in a heavily populated part of Java One of the tributaries is Oyo River.

== Geography ==
The river flows in the southwest area of Java with predominantly tropical monsoon climate (designated as Am in the Köppen-Geiger climate classification). The annual average temperature in the area is 22 °C. The warmest month is October, when the average temperature is around 26 °C, and the coldest is January, at 18 °C. The average annual rainfall is 2970 mm. The wettest month is January, with an average of 537 mm rainfall, and the driest is September, with 22 mm rainfall.

== Gallery ==
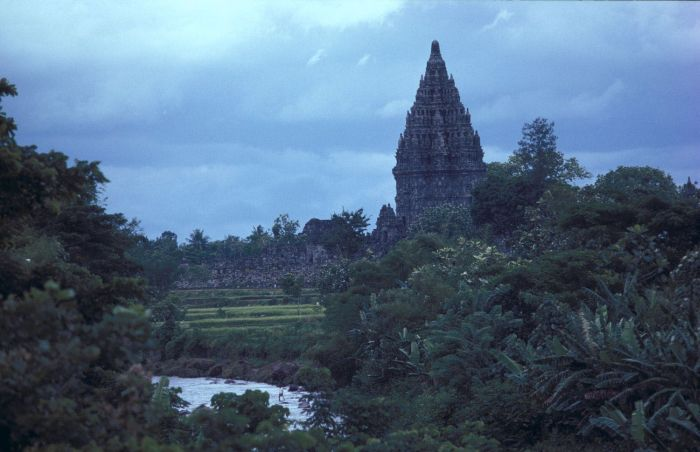
Prambanan temple on the east bank of Opak river.

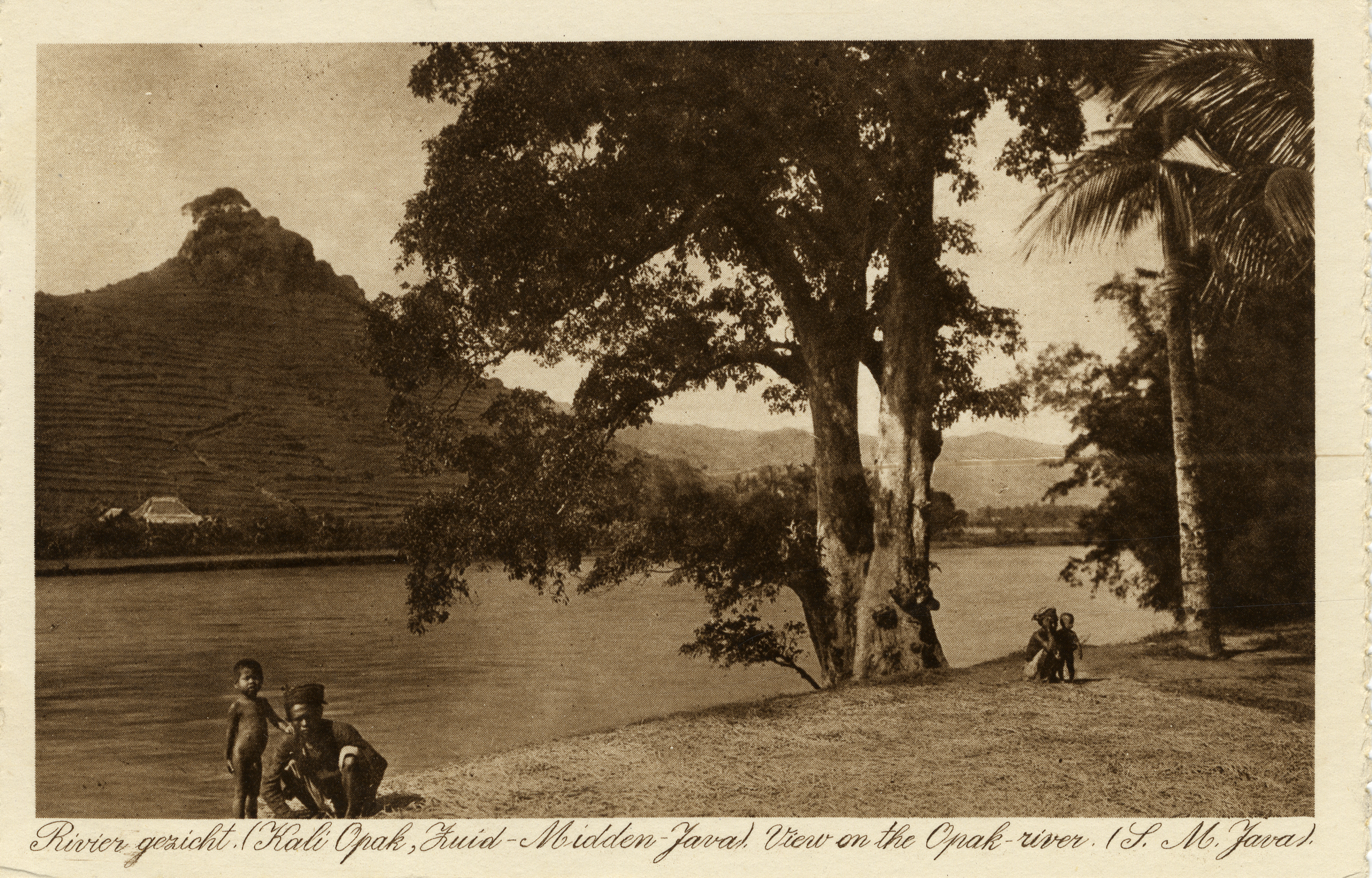
View on the Opak River. S.M. Java.

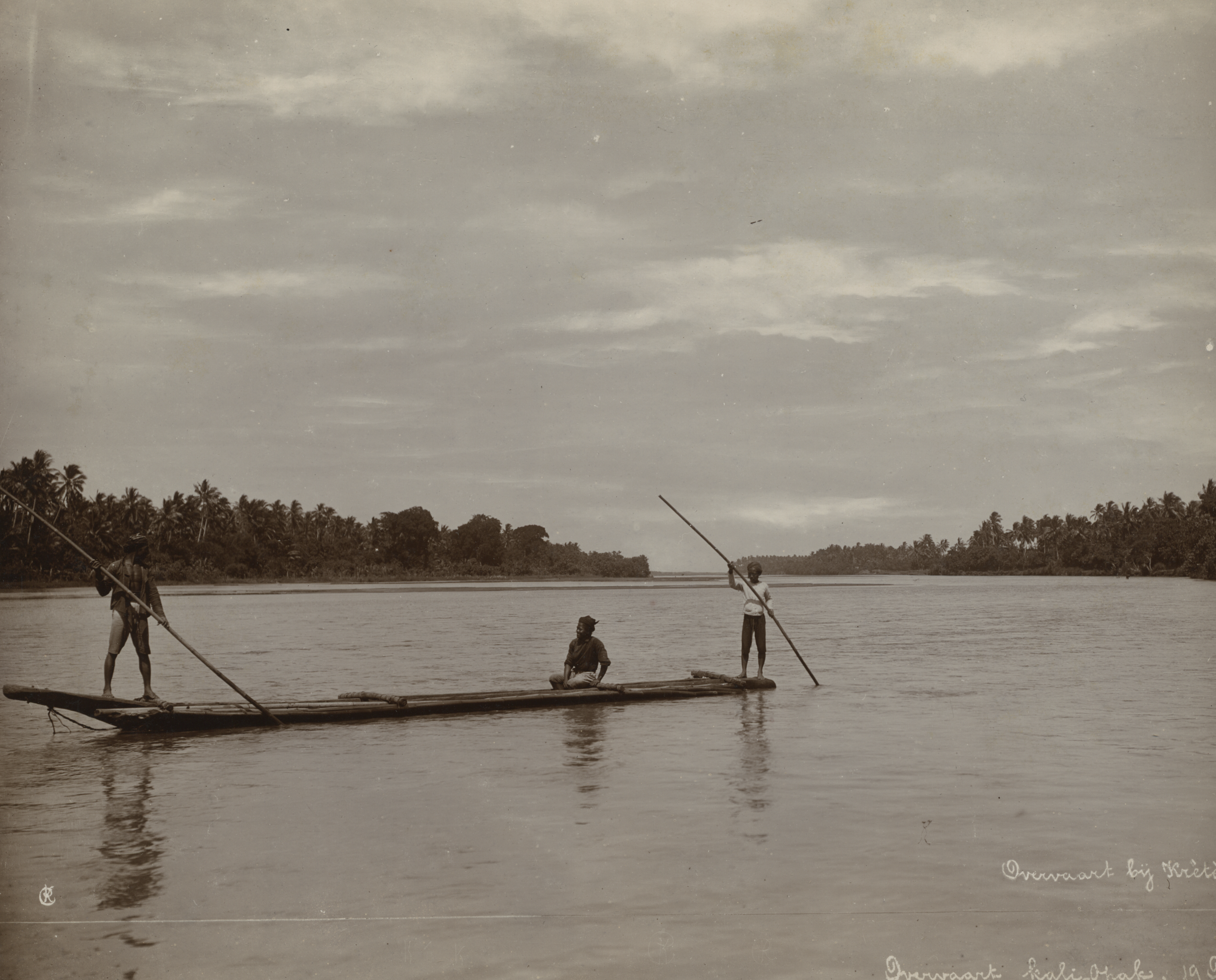
A boat crossing the Opak River.

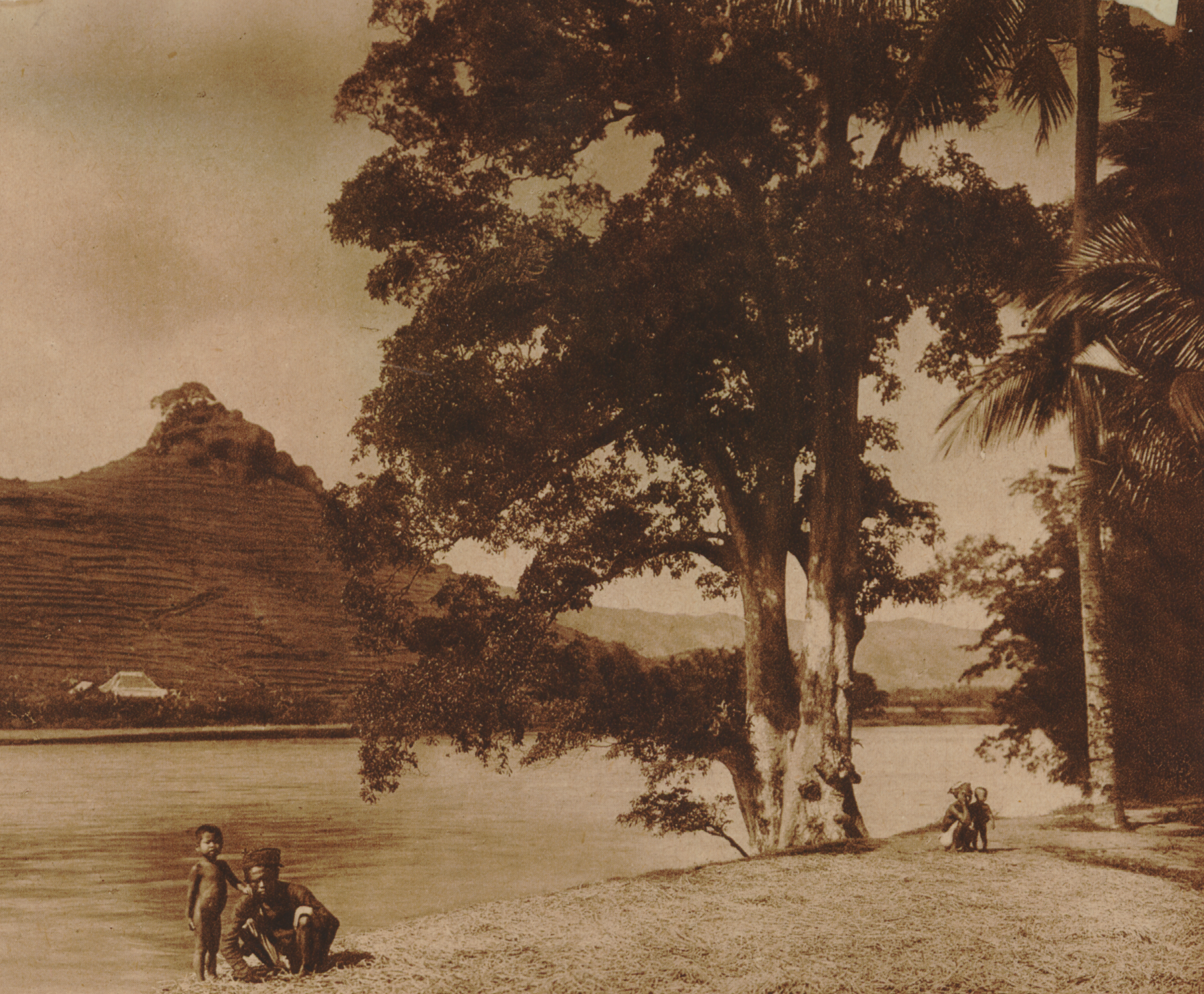
Opak River's bank.

== See also ==
- List of drainage basins of Indonesia
- List of rivers of Java
- List of rivers of Indonesia
