= List of rivers of Aceh =

Rivers in Indonesia

Major rivers of Aceh on Northern Sumatra

This is a list of rivers in Aceh, Indonesia.

== In alphabetical order ==
- Aceh River
- Alas River
- Jamboaye River
- Kluet River
- Krueng Cunda River
- Peureulak River
- Peusangan River
- Renun River
- Simpang-kanan River
- Tamiang River
- Teunom River
- Tripa River
- Woyla River

== See also ==
- Drainage basins of Sumatra
- List of drainage basins of Indonesia
- List of rivers of Indonesia
- List of rivers of Sumatra
