= List of rivers of Riau =

Major rivers of Riau

List of rivers flowing in the province of Riau, Indonesia:

== In alphabetical order ==
- Kampar
  - Kampar Kanan River
  - Kampar Kiri River
- Indragiri River
  - Ombilin River
- Rokan River
  - Kumu River
  - Rokan-kanan River
  - Rokan-kiri River
- Siak River
  - Mandau River
- Simpang-kiri River

== See also ==
- Drainage basins of Sumatra
- List of drainage basins of Indonesia
- List of rivers of Indonesia
- List of rivers of Sumatra

== Sources ==
- W. van Gelder. Dari Tanah Hindia berkoeliling boemi: kitab pengadjaran ilmoe boemi bagi sekola anak negeri di Hindia-Nederland. J.B. Wolters, 1897.Original from National Library of the Netherlands (original from Leiden University Libraries). Digitized: Nov 5, 2017.
- Wetenschappelijke voordrachten gehouden te Amsterdam in 1883, ter gelegenheid der Koloniale Tentoonstelling. Amsterdam (Netherlands). Koloniale Tentoonstelling, 1883. Uitgegeven door de Vijfde Afdeeling van het Tentoonstellings-bestuur, E. J. Brill, 1884. Cornell University. Digitized: May 22, 2014.
