= List of rivers of North Sumatra =

Major rivers of North Sumatra province on Sumatra island

List of rivers flowing in the province of North Sumatra, Indonesia:

== In alphabetical order ==
- Asahan River
  - Silau River
- Barumun River
  - Bila River
- Deli River
- Gadis River
- Kualu River
- Renun River
- Simpang-kanan River
- Toru River
- Wampu River
  - Bingai River
  - Bohorok River

== See also ==
- Drainage basins of Sumatra
- List of drainage basins of Indonesia
- List of rivers of Indonesia
- List of rivers of Sumatra

== Sources ==
- W. van Gelder. Dari Tanah Hindia berkoeliling boemi: kitab pengadjaran ilmoe boemi bagi sekola anak negeri di Hindia-Nederland. J.B. Wolters, 1897.Original from National Library of the Netherlands (original from Leiden University Libraries). Digitized: Nov 5, 2017.
- Wetenschappelijke voordrachten gehouden te Amsterdam in 1883, ter gelegenheid der Koloniale Tentoonstelling. Amsterdam (Netherlands). Koloniale Tentoonstelling, 1883. Uitgegeven door de Vijfde Afdeeling van het Tentoonstellings-bestuur, E. J. Brill, 1884. Cornell University. Digitized: May 22, 2014.
