= List of rivers of South Sumatra =

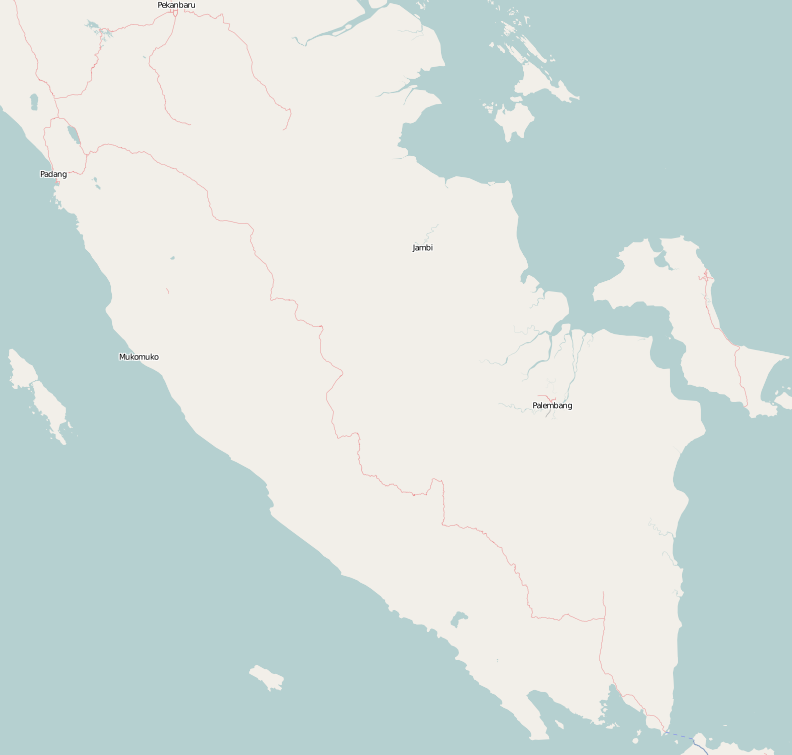
Major rivers of South Sumatra province on Sumatra island

List of rivers flowing in the province of South Sumatra, Indonesia:

== In alphabetical order ==
- Banyuasin River
- Komering River
- Musi River
- Ogan River
- Rawas River
- Simpang-kanan River

== See also ==
- Drainage basins of Sumatra
- List of drainage basins of Indonesia
- List of rivers of Indonesia
- List of rivers of Sumatra

== Sources ==
- W. van Gelder. Dari Tanah Hindia berkoeliling boemi: kitab pengadjaran ilmoe boemi bagi sekola anak negeri di Hindia-Nederland. J.B. Wolters, 1897.Original from National Library of the Netherlands (original from Leiden University Libraries). Digitized: Nov 5, 2017.
- Wetenschappelijke voordrachten gehouden te Amsterdam in 1883, ter gelegenheid der Koloniale Tentoonstelling. Amsterdam (Netherlands). Koloniale Tentoonstelling, 1883. Uitgegeven door de Vijfde Afdeeling van het Tentoonstellings-bestuur, E. J. Brill, 1884. Cornell University. Digitized: May 22, 2014.
