= Simpang-kanan River =

Simpang-kanan River (Indonesian: Sungai Simpangkanan, means: Right Junction River) is the name of several Indonesian rivers:

Some Simpang-kanan Rivers in Indonesia.
1. Simpang-kanan River (North Sumatra), 2.3483°N 97.8591°E
2. Simpang-kanan River, Riau, 1.97489°N 100.60044°E
3. Simpang-kanan River, Riau, 0.167°N 103.2554°E
4. Simpang-kanan River (South Sumatra), 2.7242°S 102.2128°E
