= Bauxite mining in Indonesia =

Bauxite has been mined in Indonesia since the Dutch colonial era. It is primarily mined in the Riau Islands area with smaller production in nearby provinces. The mined ore was largely exported, but Chinese investment in the 2020s have resulted in increased domestic processing.

== History ==
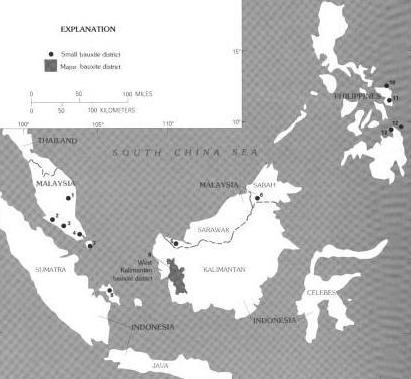
Bauxite deposits in Indonesia, Malaysia and the Philippines, 1986 USGS map

Bauxite was first discovered in modern Indonesia in the Riau Islands in 1924, under the Dutch East Indies administration. Production commenced in the 1930s, with the volume of ore mined between 1936 and 1960 being between 100 and 400 thousand tonnes, rising to 900,000 tonnes by 1967 and averaging over 1 million tonnes in the 1970s. During this time, most production was centered in the island of Bintan, with some mining operations in the smaller surrounding islands. Most ores in this period were exported to Japan, with smaller quantities being sold to Europe and North America. There were also no alumina plants in Indonesia, though there were proposals to construct one in Bintan and another in the then newly discovered bauxite deposits in West Kalimantan. Additionally, an aluminium smelter was proposed, which was to utilize hydroelectric power from the Asahan River.

In 2014, the Indonesian government banned the export of raw bauxite among other ores, intended to stimulate the development of aluminium smelters in the country. However, the ban failed to meet its objectives, with bauxite importers purchasing more ore from neighboring Malaysia. Another ban was imposed in 2023, with more successful results as Chinese metal companies invested in alumina smelters.

== Production ==
Indonesia produced an estimated 5.69 million metric tons of bauxite in 2018, compared to 1.29 million metric tons in 2017.

As of March 2024, there are four active bauxite smelters across the country.

== Ores ==
Most of Indonesia's known reserves of bauxite are located in the Riau Islands (namely Bintan), the Bangka Belitung Islands, and West Kalimantan. The reserves are in form of laterite ores, and the United States Geological Survey gave a figure of 1.2 billion tonnes of bauxite in Indonesia's reserves.
