= List of rivers of Sumatra =

Major rivers of Sumatra

This is a list of rivers flowing in the island of Sumatra, Indonesia.

== In alphabetical order ==
- Aceh
- Asahan
- Banyuasin
- Barumun
- Batang Hari
- Bila
- Bohorok
- Gadis
- Indragiri
- Jamboaye
- Kampar Kanan
- Kampar
- Kluet
- Komering
- Kualu
- Kumu
- Mandau
- Merangin
- Mesuji
- Musi
- Ogan
- Ombilin
- Peureulak
- Peusangen
- Rawas
- Renun
- Rokan
- Rokan-kanan
- Rokan-kiri
- Sekampung
- Seputih
- Siak
- Silau
- Simpang-kanan
- Simpang-kiri
- Sinamar
- Tamiang
- Tembesi
- Teunom
- Toru
- Tripa
- Tulangbawang
- Tungkal
- Wampu
- Woyla

== Mouth location ==
=== North coast ===
- Aceh River
- Peusangan River
- Krueng Cunda River
- Jamboaye River

=== Northeast coast ===
- Peureulak River
- Tamiang River
- Wampu River
  - Bingai River
  - Bohorok River
- Asahan River
  - Silau River
- Kualuh River
- Barumun River
  - Bila River (Indonesia)

=== Northwest coast ===
- Teunom River
- Woyla River
- Tripa River
- Kluet River
- Alas River
- Simpang-kanan River

=== West coast ===
- Toru River
- Gadis River

=== East coast ===
- Rokan River
  - Kumu River
  - Rokan-kiri River
  - Rokan-kanan River
- Siak River
  - Mandau River
- Kampar River
  - Kampar Kanan River
- Indragiri River
  - Ombilin River
  - Sinamar River
- Tungkal River
- Batang Hari River
  - Tembesi River
    - Merangin River

=== Southeast coast ===
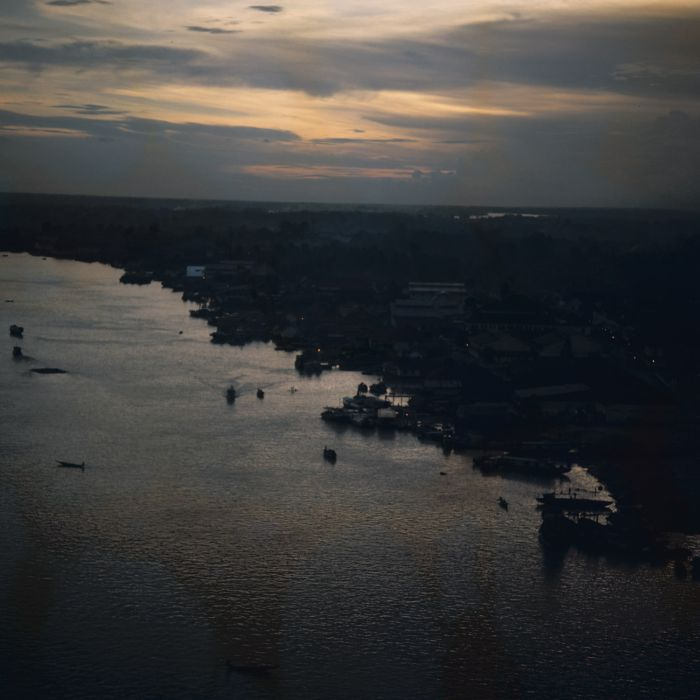
View over the Musi River at night

- Banyuasin River
- Toru River
- Musi River (Indonesia)
  - Belida River
  - Komering River
  - Ogan River
  - Rawas River
    - Simpang-kanan River
- Mesuji River
- Tulang Bawang River
- Seputih River
- Sekampung River

== By Province ==
=== Aceh ===
- Aceh River
- Alas River
- Jamboaye River
- Kluet River
- Krueng Cunda River
- Peureulak River
- Peusangan River
- Renun River
- Simpang-kanan River
- Tamiang River
- Teunom River
- Tripa River
- Woyla River

=== Jambi ===
- Batang Hari River
- Merangin River
- Tembesi River
- Tungkal River

=== Lampung ===
- Mesuji River
- Sekampung River
- Seputih River
- Tulangbawang River

=== North Sumatra ===
- Asahan River
  - Silau River
- Barumun River
  - Bila River
- Deli River
- Gadis River
- Kualu River
- Renun River
- Simpang-kanan River
- Toru River
- Wampu River
  - Bingai River
  - Bohorok River

=== Riau ===
- Kampar
  - Kampar Kanan River
  - Kampar Kiri River
- Indragiri River
  - Ombilin River
- Rokan River
  - Kumu River
  - Rokan-kanan River
  - Rokan-kiri River
- Siak River
  - Mandau River
- Simpang-kiri River

=== South Sumatra ===
- Banyuasin River
- Komering River
- Musi River
- Ogan River
- Rawas River
- Simpang-kanan River

=== West Sumatra ===
- Batang Hari
- Kampar
  - Kampar Kanan
- Ombilin/Indragiri
  - Sinamar

== See also ==
- Drainage basins of Sumatra
- List of drainage basins of Indonesia
- List of rivers of Indonesia

== Sources ==
- W. van Gelder. Dari Tanah Hindia berkoeliling boemi: kitab pengadjaran ilmoe boemi bagi sekola anak negeri di Hindia-Nederland. J.B. Wolters, 1897.Original from National Library of the Netherlands (original from Leiden University Libraries). Digitized: Nov 5, 2017.
- Wetenschappelijke voordrachten gehouden te Amsterdam in 1883, ter gelegenheid der Koloniale Tentoonstelling. Amsterdam (Netherlands). Koloniale Tentoonstelling, 1883. Uitgegeven door de Vijfde Afdeeling van het Tentoonstellings-bestuur, E. J. Brill, 1884. Cornell University. Digitized: May 22, 2014.
