= Hari River =

Hari River may refer to:

- Hari River (Afghanistan), one of the three major rivers of Afghanistan
- Batang Hari River, the longest river in Sumatra, Indonesia
