= Asahan =

Asahan may refer to:

== Indonesia ==
- Asahan Regency, an administrative division of North Sumatra, Indonesia
- Asahan River, a river in Sumatra, Indonesia
- Asahan Sultanate, a Malay sultanate which reigned in what is now Asahan Regency until 1946

== Malaysia ==
- Asahan (town), a town in Malacca, Malaysia
- Asahan (state constituency), a constituency represented in the Malacca State Legislative Assembly
