= Tembesi River =

Coordinates: 1°43′S 103°06′E

Tembesi River Batang Tembesi, Sungai Tembesi
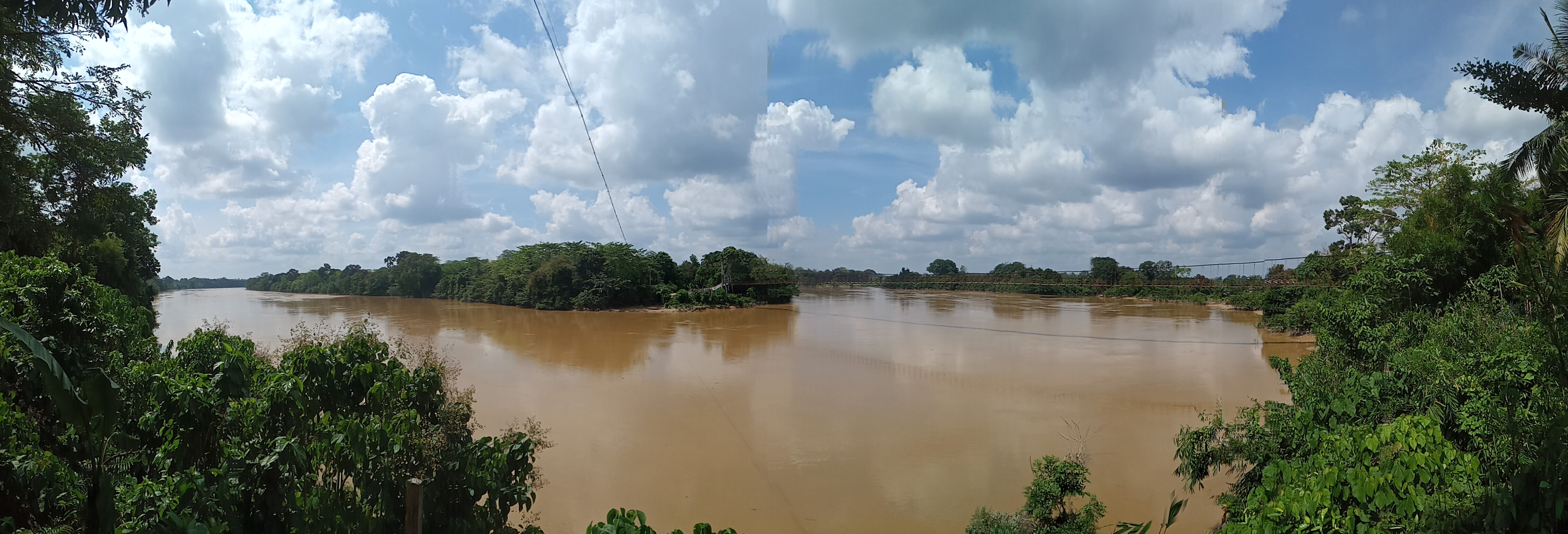

- Location of river mouth Tembesi River (Indonesia)

Location
- Country: Indonesia
- Province: Jambi

Physical characteristics
- Source
  - location: Sumatra
- Mouth: Batang Hari River

Tembesi River is a river in Jambi province, Sumatra island, Indonesia, about 600 km northwest of the capital Jakarta. It is a tributary of the Batang Hari River. Tributaries include the Merangin River.

== Geography ==
The river flows in the central area of Sumatra with predominantly tropical rainforest climate (designated as Af in the Köppen-Geiger climate classification). The annual average temperature in the area is 23 °C. The warmest month is October, when the average temperature is around 24 °C, and the coldest is January, at 22 °C. The average annual rainfall is 2893 mm. The wettest month is December, with an average of 346 mm rainfall, and the driest is June, with 101 mm rainfall.

== See also ==
- List of drainage basins of Indonesia
- List of rivers of Indonesia
- List of rivers of Sumatra
