= Merangin River =

Merangin River Batang Merangin, Sungai Merangin
- Location of river mouth Merangin River (Indonesia)

Location
- Country: Indonesia
- Province: Jambi

Physical characteristics
- Source: Lake Kerinci
  - location: Kerinci Regency
- Mouth: Batang Hari
  - location: Bungo Regency
  - coordinates: 2.1484°S 102.7841°E

The Merangin River is a river in Jambi province, Sumatra island, Indonesia, about 600 km northwest of the capital Jakarta. It is a tributary of the Batang Hari River, through Tembesi River.

== Geography ==
The river flows in the central area of Sumatra, which has a predominantly tropical rainforest climate (designated as Af in the Köppen-Geiger climate classification). The annual average temperature in the area is 23 °C. The warmest month is May, when the average temperature is around 24 °C, and the coldest is December, at 22 °C. The average annual rainfall is 3509 mm. The wettest month is December, with an average of 477 mm rainfall, and the driest is June, with 115 mm rainfall.

== Uses ==
Hydroelectric Power Plant Merangin is built on the Merangin with a capacity of 4 x 87.5 MW (megawatt). Energy produced per year is 1,280 Giga Watt hour (GWh). The plant operates commercially (COD) in 2025 to supply electricity to the Central South Section system which is regulated by the PLN Sumatra Load Control Center.

== See also ==
- List of drainage basins of Indonesia
- List of rivers of Indonesia
- List of rivers of Sumatra
