= Lematang River =

Coordinates: 3°01′58″S 104°15′29″E

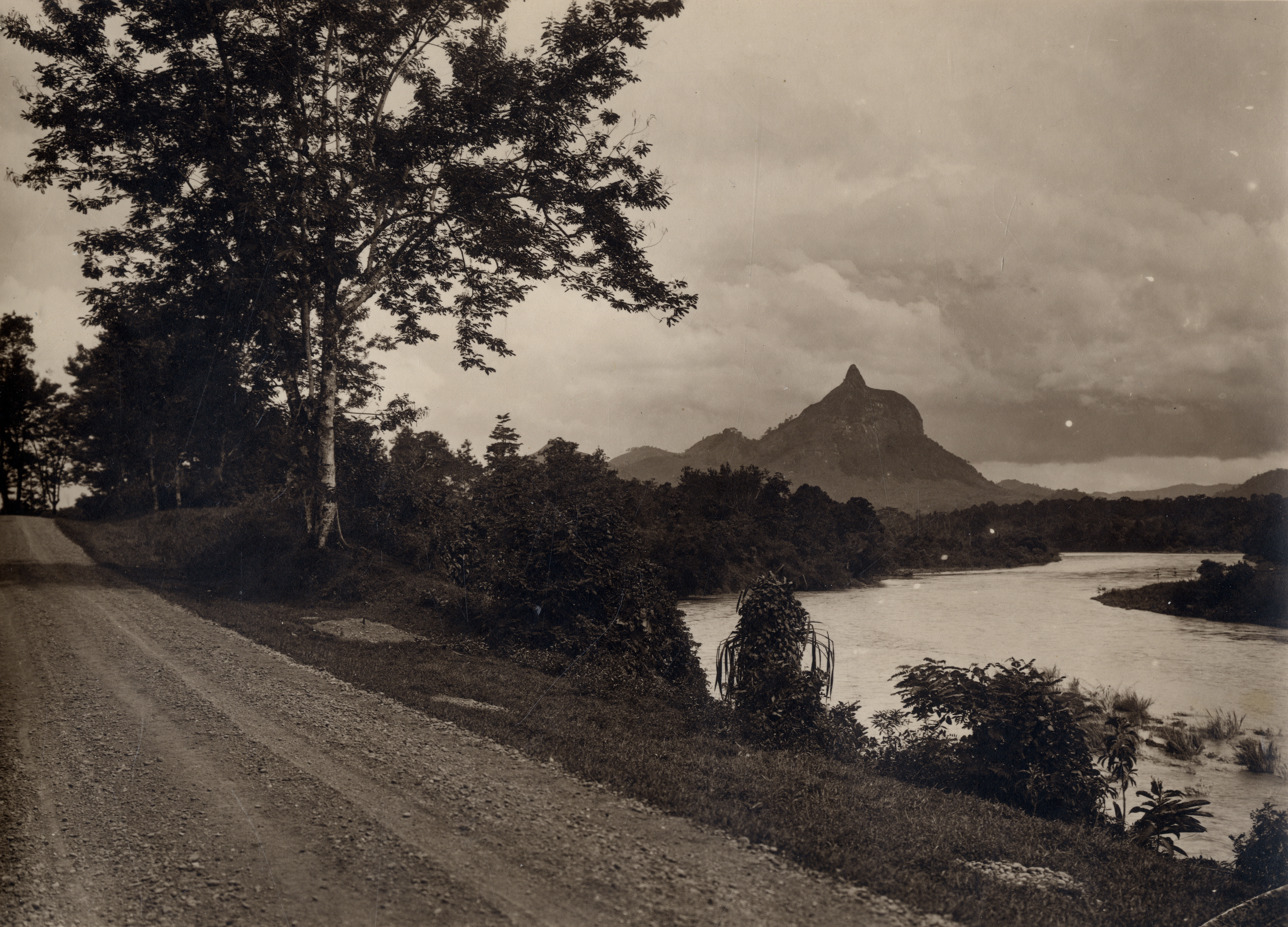
- Native name: Sungai Lematang (Indonesian)

Location
- Country: Indonesia
- Province: South Sumatra

Physical characteristics
- Mouth: Muara Lematang, Musi River (Indonesia)
  - location: Tebing Abang, Banyuasin Regency
- Depth
  - minimum: 0.5 m (1 ft 8 in)
  - maximum: 30 m (98 ft)

Basin features
- River system: Musi basin

The Lematang River is a river located in South Sumatra, Indonesia. It has a depth of 0.5 to 30 m (1 ft 8 in to 98 ft 5 in) Lematang people live along the river.

== See also ==
- List of drainage basins of Indonesia
