= Bingai River =

Bingai River Soengai Bindjai, Soengai Bingai, Lao Bingai, Sei Bingei
- Location of the mouth Bingai River (Indonesia)
- Native name: Sungai Bingai (Indonesian)

Location
- Country: Indonesia
- State: North Sumatra

Physical characteristics
- Mouth: Wampu River
  - coordinates: 3°42′26″N 98°23′23″E

Bingai river (Indonesian: Sungai Bingai) is a river in the province of North Sumatra of Sumatra island, Indonesia, flowing into Wampu River, about 1400 km to the northwest of the capital Jakarta. The river passes through the City of Binjai, with a length of 15 km and the drainage basin area of 150 km^{2} in North Binjai area.

== Geography ==
The river flows along the northeast area of Sumatra with predominantly tropical rainforest climate (designated as Af in the Köppen-Geiger climate classification). The annual average temperature in the area is 25 °C. The warmest month is March, when the average temperature is around 26 °C, and the coldest is January, at 23 °C. The average annual rainfall is 3495 mm. The wettest month is October, with an average of 460 mm rainfall, and the driest is March, with 192 mm rainfall.

== Natural resources ==
The state water company, PDAM Tirtasari, works together with PT Sumut Tirta Resource Lien Cheng, and the mayor of Binjai City to form a purchase agreement of processed water with a build operate and transfer (BOT) scheme for 25 years, that PT Sumut Tirta Resource builds and operates the water treatment plant to process raw water from Bingai river, then the processed water is bought by PDAM Tirtasari in the amount of 25,488 cubic meter/day to supply household customers.

== Ecology ==
Periphyton Community Structure research in 2015 discovered 34 genus of organism in 3 families: Bacillariophyceae (23 genus), Chlorophyceae (8 genus), and Cyanophyceae (3 genus), at 3 stations. Periphyton Diversity (H´) ranged from 2.38 to 2.70. Abundance ranged from 10,136 to 30,216 ind/cm^{2}. Acidity (pH) ranged from 7,35 − 7,45, dissolved oxygen (DO) ranged from 4.65 to 4.75 mg/L, brightness ranged from 42.5 to 60 cm, current ranged from 0.15 to 0.21 m/sec, nitrates ranged from 2.1 to 2.55 mg/L, phosphates ranged from 0.18 to 0.25 mg/L.

== Tourist attraction ==
Rafting activities has been established in the river, which is also called "Sungai Bingei" or "Sei Bingei" by the local people, especially in the village of Sei Bingei, Binjai, Langkat Regency. Traveling from the starting point of Binjai (Binjai Super Mall) to the Sei Bingei or Namu Sira sira takes about 30 minutes through scenic road, until reaching the sign "RapidPlus Arung Jeram Sei Bingei" which denotes the destination. Rafting in Bingai river has the difficulty level of 2–3 in the international classification, still within the safe category for beginners, with a distance of 6 km to be covered in about 2 hours.

== See also ==
- List of drainage basins of Indonesia
- List of rivers of Indonesia
- List of rivers in Sumatra
