= Sinamar River =

Coordinates: 0.58333°S 100.86667°E

Sinamar River Batang Sinamar, Sungai Sinamar
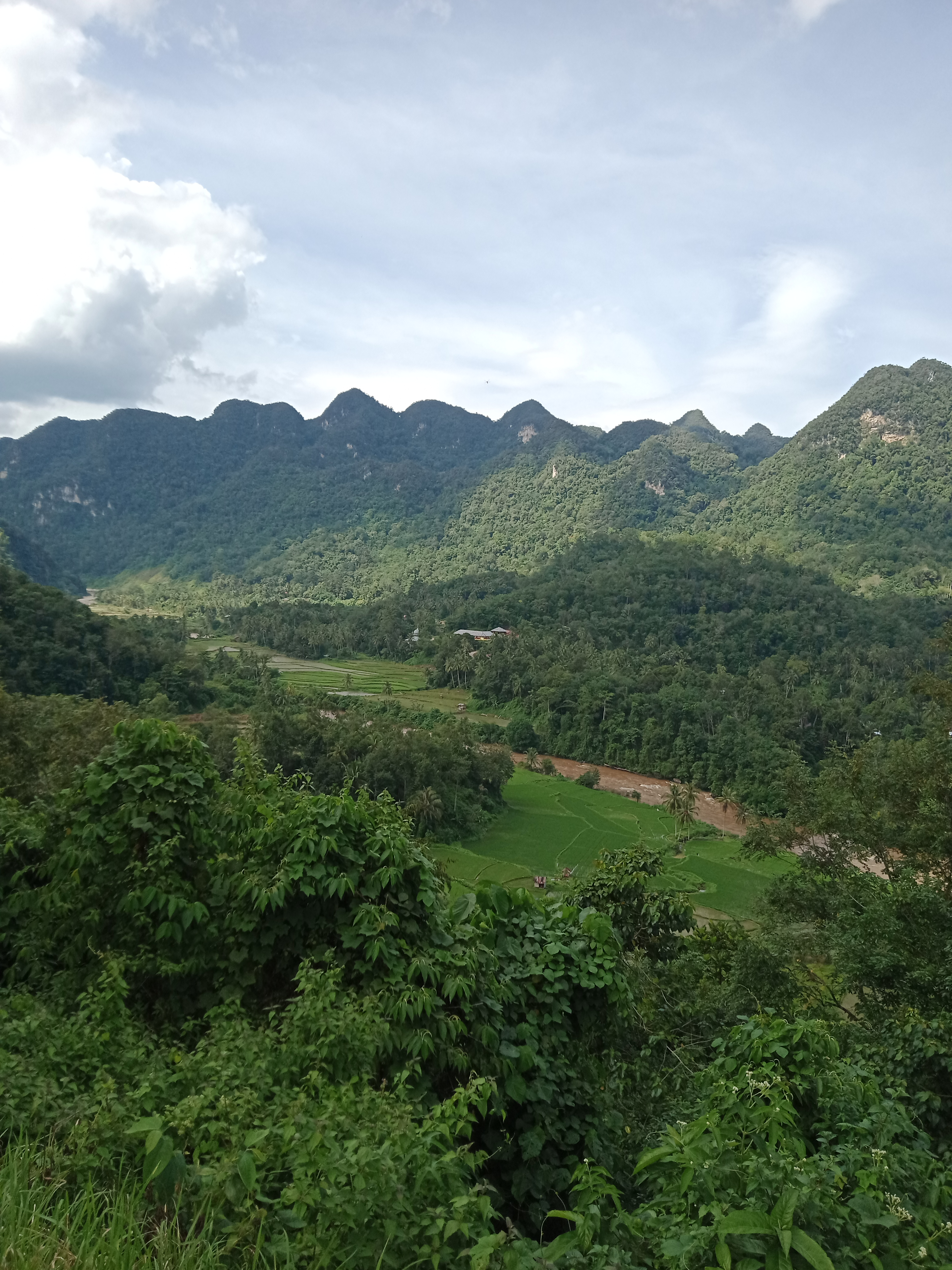

- Location of river mouth Sinamar River (Indonesia)

Location
- Country: Indonesia

Physical characteristics
- Source
  - location: West Sumatra
- Mouth: Ombilin River

The Sinamar River is a river in West Sumatra province, in the central part of Sumatra island, Indonesia, about 900 km northwest of the capital Jakarta. It is a tributary of the rivers Ombilin or Indragiri.

== Geography ==
The river flows in the central area of Sumatra with predominantly tropical rainforest climate (designated as Af in the Köppen–Geiger climate classification). The annual average temperature in the area is 23 °C. The warmest month is September, when the average temperature is around 24 °C, and the coldest is January, at 21 °C. The average annual rainfall is 3023 mm. The wettest month is November, with an average of 444 mm rainfall, and the driest is June, with 124 mm rainfall.

== See also ==
- List of drainage basins of Indonesia
- List of rivers of Indonesia
- List of rivers of Sumatra
