= Teunom River =

Teunom River Krueng Teunom, Sungai Teunom, Tönom
- Mouth location of Krueng Teunom (blue) and its sources (green)

Location
- Country: Indonesia
- Province: Aceh

Physical characteristics
- Source: Mount Hulumasen
  - location: Sumatra
  - coordinates: 5.0456°N 95.6319°E
  - elevation: 2,280 m (7,480 ft)
- 2nd source: Mount Peuët Sagoë (Barisan Mountains)
  - location: Geumpang (Pidie)
  - elevation: 2,500 m (8,200 ft)
- 3rd source: Tangse valley
  - location: Tangse (Pidie)
  - elevation: 1,000 m (3,300 ft)
- Mouth: Indian Ocean
  - location: Teunom
  - coordinates: 4.44324°N 95.80509°E
- Basin size: 2,550 km^{2} (980 mi^{2})

Basin features
- River system: Teunom basin

Teunom River is a river in northern Sumatra, in the province of Aceh, Indonesia, about 136 kilometres (85 miles) southeast of Banda Aceh.

== Geography ==
The river flows along the northern area of Sumatra with predominantly tropical rainforest climate (designated as Af in the Köppen-Geiger climate classification). The annual average temperature in the area is 23 °C. The warmest month is February, when the average temperature is around 26 °C, and the coldest is January, at 22 °C. The average annual rainfall is 4059 mm. The wettest month is November, with an average of 536 mm rainfall, and the driest is July, with 205 mm rainfall.

== See also ==
- List of drainage basins of Indonesia
- List of rivers of Aceh
- List of rivers of Indonesia
- List of rivers of Sumatra
