= Belida River =

Belida River may refer to a number of rivers in Sumatra, Indonesia and in Malaysia. It is known locally as Sungai Belida ("sungai" in Indonesian or Malaysian language means "river").

== Indonesia ==
- Sungai Belida, Riau: a tributary of Indragiri River, province of Riau, and is nearby to Transmigration Block C 0 Unit I Lumu, Tanjungputat and Transmigration Block B Unit I Lumu 0.4658°S 102.65642°E, elevation: 11 m (36 feet).
- Sungai Belida, North Sumatra: an irrigation ditch within North Sumatra province and is nearby to Kebon Kelapa, Kampung Pinang and Sungaiular, 3.877°N 98.477°E, elevation: 6 m (20 feet).
- Sungai Belida, South Sumatra: a tributary of Musi River, South Sumatra, passing the city of Prabumulih.

== Malaysia ==
- Sungai Belida, Kelantan (lat 5,87, long 102,42), 5.86667°N 102.41667°E
- Sungai Belida, Kedah, 5.78432°N 100.36758°E
- Sungai Belida, Pahang (lat 4,29, long 101,76), 4.2914°N 101.7604°E
- Sungai Belida, Pahang (lat 4,19, long 102,08), 4.1897°N 102.0753°E
- Sungai Belida, Sarawak, 1.76667°N 111.3°E
- Sungai Belida, Kelantan (lat 4,88, long 102,48), 4.8803°N 102.477°E
