= Gadis River =

Coordinates: 1.0483°N 98.9292°E

Gadis River Sungai Batang Gadis, Sungai Gadis, Batang Gadis, Aek Batanggadis
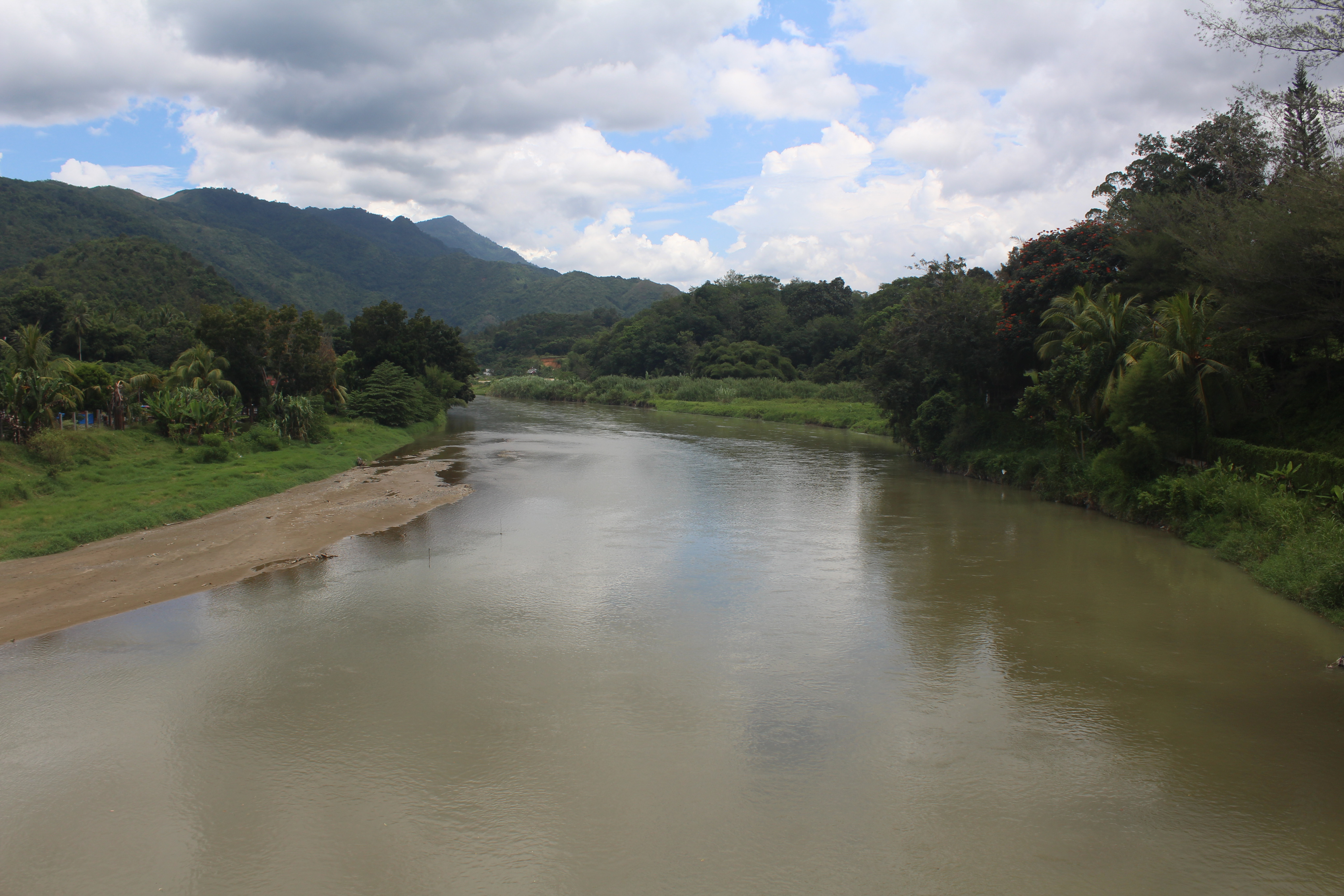

- Location of the mouth Gadis River (Indonesia)

Location
- Country: Indonesia

Physical characteristics
- Source: Barisan Mountains
  - location: Pakantan, Mandailing Natal Regency
- Mouth: Pacific Ocean
  - location: Muara Batang Gadis, Mandailing Natal Regency
- Length: 137.50 km (85.44 mi)
- Basin size: 4,840 km^{2} (1,870 sq mi)

Basin features
- River system: Batang Gadis basin

Gadis River (Indonesian: Batang Gadis, means: Virgin River) is a river in northern Sumatra, Indonesia.

== Geography ==
The river flows along the northwest area of Sumatra, which has a predominantly tropical rainforest climate (designated as Af in the Köppen-Geiger climate classification). The annual average temperature in the area is 25 °C. The warmest month is March, when the average temperature is around 26 °C, and the coldest is January, at 23 °C. The average annual rainfall is 3953 mm. The wettest month is November, with an average of 588 mm rainfall, and the driest is June, with 175 mm rainfall.

== See also ==
- List of drainage basins of Indonesia
- List of rivers of Indonesia
- List of rivers in Sumatra
