= Peureulak River =

Coordinates: 4.8875°N 97.8937°E

Peureulak River Sungai Peureulak, Krueng Peureula, Sungai Peureula, Air Peureulak
- Location of river mouth Peureulak River (Sumatra) Peureulak River (Indonesia)
- Native name: Krueng Peureulak (Indonesian)

Location
- Country: Indonesia

Physical characteristics
- Source
  - location: Aceh, Sumatra
- Mouth: Malacca Strait

Peureulak River (Krueng Peurelak) is a river in the province of Aceh, northern Sumatra, Indonesia, about 1,600 km northwest of the capital Jakarta.

== Geography ==
The river flows in the northern area of Sumatra, which has predominantly tropical rainforest climate (designated as Af in the Köppen-Geiger climate classification). The annual average temperature in the area is 26 °C. The warmest month is February, when the average temperature is around 27 °C, and the coldest is March, at 24 °C. The average annual rainfall is 2996 mm. The wettest month is December, with an average of 526 mm rainfall, and the driest is March, with 156 mm rainfall.

== See also ==
- List of drainage basins of Indonesia
- List of rivers of Indonesia
- List of rivers of Sumatra
