= Sekampung River =

Coordinates: 5.5767°S 105.81456°E

Sekampung River Sungai Sekampung, Wai Sekampung, Wai Sekampoeng
- Location of river mouth Sekampung River (Indonesia)

Location
- Country: Indonesia

Physical characteristics
- Source
  - location: Lampung, Sumatra
- Mouth: Java Sea

Sekampung River is a river in Lampung province, southern Sumatra, Indonesia, about 130 km northwest of the capital Jakarta.

== Geography ==
The river flows in the southeast area of Sumatra with predominantly tropical rainforest climate (designated as Af in the Köppen-Geiger climate classification). The annual average temperature in the area is 26 °C. The warmest month is October, when the average temperature is around 28 °C, and the coldest is March, at 25 °C. The average annual rainfall is 2932 mm. The wettest month is January, with an average of 433 mm rainfall, and the driest is September, with 63 mm rainfall.

== See also ==
- List of drainage basins of Indonesia
- List of rivers of Indonesia
- List of rivers of Sumatra
