= Krueng Cunda River =

Coordinates: 5.2166°N 97.118°E

- Location of river mouth Krueng Cunda River (Sumatra) Krueng Cunda River (Indonesia)

Location
- Country: Indonesia
- Province: Aceh

Physical characteristics
- Source: Mount Bur ni Geureudong
  - location: Djambo
- Mouth: Malacca Strait
  - location: Lhokseumawe
- Basin size: 535 km^{2} (207 sq mi)

Basin features
- River system: Geukuh basin
- Cities: Keudekarieng

Krueng Cunda River is a river in Aceh on Sumatra island, in Indonesia, about 1700 km northwest of the capital Jakarta. It forms a strait separating the main part of Lhokseumawe from the island of Sumatra.

== Geography ==
The river flows in the northern area of Sumatra with predominantly tropical rainforest climate (designated as Af in the Köppen-Geiger climate classification). The annual average temperature in the area is 25 °C. The warmest month is August, when the average temperature is around 26 °C, and the coldest is December, at 22 °C. The average annual rainfall is 2568 mm. The wettest month is December, with an average of 572 mm rainfall, and the driest is March, with 114 mm rainfall.

== See also ==
- List of drainage basins of Indonesia
- List of rivers of Indonesia
- List of rivers of Sumatra
