= Bohorok River =

Coordinates: 3.5047°N 98.1863°E

Bohorok River Sungai Bohorok, Sungai Bahorok
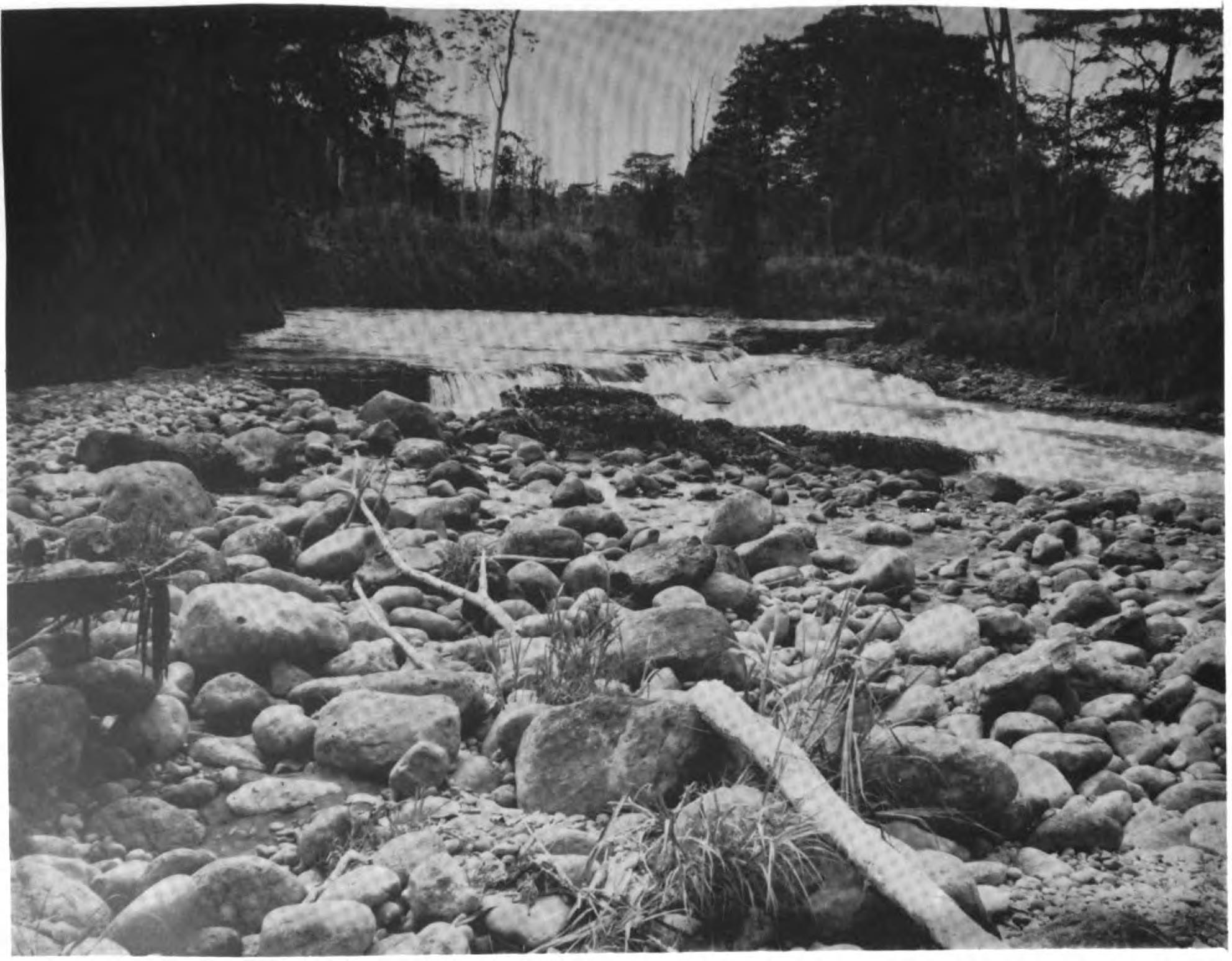

- Location of river mouth Bohorok River (Sumatra) Bohorok River (Indonesia)

Location
- Country: Indonesia
- Province: North Sumatra
- Regency: Langkat

Physical characteristics
- Mouth: Wampu River
  - location: Langkat Regency

The Bohorok River is a river of the Langkat Regency in North Sumatra province, Indonesia, about 1,400 km northwest of the capital Jakarta. It is a tributary of Wampu River.

== Events ==
In October 2003, a large-scale flash flood in the Bohorok killed 242 persons.

== Geography ==
The river flows in the northern area of Sumatra with predominantly tropical rainforest climate (designated as Af in the Köppen-Geiger climate classification). The annual average temperature in the area is 23 °C. The warmest month is February, when the average temperature is around 24 °C, and the coldest is December, at 22 °C. The average annual rainfall is 2918 mm. The wettest month is December, with an average of 352 mm rainfall, and the driest is June, with 125 mm rainfall.

== See also ==
- List of drainage basins of Indonesia
- List of rivers of Indonesia
- List of rivers of Sumatra
