= Simpang-kiri River =

Coordinates: 0.1658°N 103.2555°E

Simpang-kiri River Sungai Simpangkiri, Sungai Simpang Kiri
- Location of river mouth Simpang-kiri River (Indonesia)

Location
- Country: Indonesia
- Province: Riau

Physical characteristics
- Source
  - location: Sumatra
- Mouth: Kateman River
  - location: Riau

Simpang-kiri River (Indonesian: Sungai Simpangkiri, means: Left Junction River) is a river in Riau province, central-eastern Sumatra, Indonesia, about 800 km northwest of the capital Jakarta.

== Geography ==
The river flows in the central area of Sumatra with predominantly tropical rainforest climate (designated as Af in the Köppen-Geiger climate classification). The annual average temperature in the area is 24 °C. The warmest month is March, when the average temperature is around 26 °C, and the coldest is January, at 23 °C. The average annual rainfall is 2667 mm. The wettest month is November, with an average of 402 mm rainfall, and the driest is June, with 104 mm rainfall.

Simpang-kiri River

Climate chart (precipitation, max. and min. temperature)
J	F	M	A	M	J	J	A	S	O	N	D
112 25 21	261 27 21	225 29 22	276 26 22	244 26 23	104 26 22	217 26 22	149 26 23	173 26 21	208 27 21	402 26 22	297 27 21
- █ Average max. and min. temperatures in °C
- █ Precipitation totals in mm
Imperial conversion
J	F	M	A	M	J	J	A	S	O	N	D
4.4 77 70	10 81 70	8.9 84 72	11 79 72	9.6 79 73	4.1 79 72	8.5 79 72	5.9 79 73	6.8 79 70	8.2 81 70	16 79 72	12 81 70
- █ Average max. and min. temperatures in °F
- █ Precipitation totals in inches

== See also ==
- List of drainage basins of Indonesia
- List of rivers of Indonesia
- List of rivers of Sumatra
