= Simpang-kanan River (South Sumatra) =

River in southern Sumatra, Indonesia

Coordinates: 2.7242°S 102.2128°E

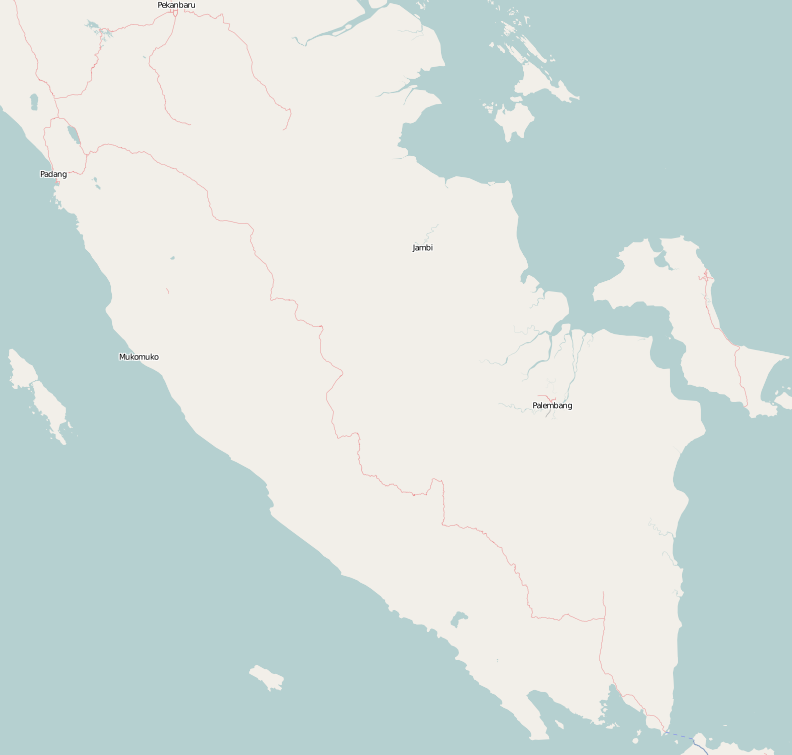
- Location of river mouth Simpang-kanan River (South Sumatra) (Sumatra) Simpang-kanan River (South Sumatra) (Indonesia)

Location
- Country: Indonesia

Physical characteristics
- Source: Mount Bujang
  - location: South Sumatra
  - elevation: 1,951 m (6,401 ft)
- Mouth: Rawas River
  - location: Hulu Simpang Kiri Hill, South Sumatra
  - elevation: 1,003 m (3,291 ft)

The Simpang-kanan River (Indonesian: Sungai Simpangkanan, lit. 'Right Junction River') is a river in southern Sumatra, Indonesia, about 600 km northwest of the capital Jakarta. It is a tributary of the Rawas River.

== Hydrology ==
The Simpang-kanan River rises up on Mount Bujang (1951 meter), converging with the Simpang-kiri River, which springs from Lumut Hill (1500 meter), northwest of Hulu Simpang Kiri Hill (1003 meter) and changing name into the Rawas River, a tributary of the Musi River.

== Geography ==
The river flows in the southern area of Sumatra with predominantly tropical rainforest climate (designated as Af in the Köppen–Geiger climate classification). The annual average temperature in the area is 23 °C. The warmest month is October, when the average temperature is around 24 °C, and the coldest is June, at 22 °C. The average annual rainfall is 3546 mm. The wettest month is December, with an average of 482 mm rainfall, and the driest is June, with 115 mm rainfall.

== See also ==
- List of drainage basins of Indonesia
- List of rivers of Indonesia
- List of rivers of Sumatra
