= Alas River =

Coordinates: 2.9899°N 97.9362°E

Alas River Lae Alas, Lawe Alas, Sungai Alas
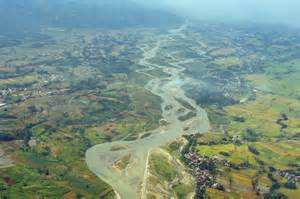
- Aerial photo of the Alas River

- Location of river mouth Alas River (Sumatra) Alas River (Indonesia)

Location
- Country: Indonesia
- Province: Aceh

Alas River is a river in Aceh in northeastern Sumatra, Indonesia, about 1400 km northwest of the capital Jakarta. It is known for its white water rafting. The banks of the rivers are inhabited by the Alas people.

== Geography ==
The river flows in the northern area of Sumatra with predominantly tropical rainforest climate (designated as Af in the Köppen-Geiger climate classification). The annual average temperature in the area is 22 °C. The warmest month is March, when the average temperature is around 23 °C, and the coldest is June, at 21 °C. The average annual rainfall is 2943 mm. The wettest month is December, with an average of 370 mm rainfall, and the driest is June, with 82 mm rainfall.

== See also ==
- List of drainage basins of Indonesia
- List of rivers of Indonesia
- List of rivers of Sumatra
- Alas people
