= Tungkal River =

Coordinates: 0.7962°S 103.4877°E

Tungkal River Sungai Tungkal, Soengai Toengkal, Toengkal River, Soengai Toengkat
- Location of river mouth Tungkal River (Indonesia)

Location
- Country: Indonesia
- Province: Jambi

Physical characteristics
- Source
  - location: Sumatra
- Mouth: Malacca Strait

Tungkal River is a river in Jambi province, Sumatra island, Indonesia, about 700 km northwest of the capital Jakarta.

== Geography ==
The river flows in the southwest area of Java with predominantly tropical rainforest climate (designated as Af in the Köppen-Geiger climate classification). The annual average temperature in the area is 24 °C. The warmest month is September, when the average temperature is around 26 °C, and the coldest is December, at 22 °C. The average annual rainfall is 2907 mm. The wettest month is December, with an average of 410 mm rainfall, and the driest is June, with 137 mm rainfall.

Tungkal River

Climate chart (precipitation, max. and min. temperature)
J	F	M	A	M	J	J	A	S	O	N	D
144 24 20	232 26 22	254 23 21	323 25 23	278 24 24	137 26 22	245 27 23	150 27 23	183 29 22	247 27 22	303 25 23	410 23 20
- █ Average max. and min. temperatures in °C
- █ Precipitation totals in mm
Imperial conversion
J	F	M	A	M	J	J	A	S	O	N	D
5.7 75 68	9.1 79 72	10 73 70	13 77 73	11 75 75	5.4 79 72	9.6 81 73	5.9 81 73	7.2 84 72	9.7 81 72	12 77 73	16 73 68
- █ Average max. and min. temperatures in °F
- █ Precipitation totals in inches

== See also ==
- List of drainage basins of Indonesia
- List of rivers of Indonesia
- List of rivers of Sumatra
