= Seputih River =

River in Indonesia

Coordinates: 4.68146°S 105.87396°E

Seputih River Way Seputih, Sepoeti Rivier, Seputi, Wai Sepoetih

Location
- Country: Indonesia
- Province: Lampung

Physical characteristics
- Source: Mount Tangkit Tebak
  - location: North Lampung Regency, Sumatra
- Mouth: Java Sea
- Length: 190 km (120 mi)
- Basin size: 7,516 km^{2} (2,902 sq mi)

Basin features
- River system: Seputih basin
- Way Seputih (blue-M) and its source (green)

Seputih River is a river in Lampung province, southern Sumatra, Indonesia, about 200 km northwest of the capital Jakarta.

== Geography ==
The river flows in the southeast area of Sumatra with predominantly tropical rainforest climate (designated as Af in the Köppen-Geiger climate classification). The annual average temperature in the area is 25 °C. The warmest month is September, when the average temperature is around 27 °C, and the coldest is February, at 24 °C. The average annual rainfall is 3176 mm. The wettest month is December, with an average of 501 mm rainfall, and the driest is September, with 33 mm rainfall.

== See also ==
- List of drainage basins of Indonesia
- List of rivers of Indonesia
- List of rivers of Sumatra
