= Tripa River =

River in Indonesia

Coordinates: 3.8936°N 96.3556°E

Tripa River Krueng Tripa, Sungai Tripa, Tripa-rivier, Tripo, Krueng Teripa
- Location of river mouth Tripa River (Sumatra) Tripa River (Indonesia)

Location
- Country: Indonesia

Physical characteristics
- Source
  - location: Aceh, Sumatra

Tripa River is a river in the province of Aceh, northern Sumatra island, Indonesia, about 1,600 km northwest of the capital Jakarta.

== Geography ==
The river flows in the northern area of Sumatra which has a predominantly tropical rainforest climate (designated as Af in the Köppen-Geiger climate classification). The annual average temperature in the area is 23 °C. The warmest month is January, when the average temperature is around 24 °C, and the coldest is August, at 22 °C. The average annual rainfall is 4124 mm. The wettest month is November, with an average of 541 mm rainfall, and the driest is July, with 193 mm rainfall.

== See also ==
- List of drainage basins of Indonesia
- List of rivers of Indonesia
- List of rivers of Sumatra
