= Kluet River =

Coordinates: 3.0547°N 97.3164°E

Kluet River Krueng Kluet, Sungai Kluet, Kloeët-rivier, Kluat, Kroeëng Kloeët
- Location of river mouth Kluet River (Sumatra) Kluet River (Indonesia)

Location
- Country: Indonesia

Physical characteristics
- Source
  - location: Aceh, Sumatra

Kluet River is a river in the province of Aceh, in northern Sumatra, Indonesia, about 1,500 km northwest of the capital Jakarta.

== Geography ==
The river flows in the northern area of Sumatra, which has a predominantly tropical rainforest climate (designated as Af in the Köppen-Geiger climate classification). The annual average temperature in the area is 23 °C. The warmest month is February, when the average temperature is around 24 °C, and the coldest is July, at 21 °C. The average annual rainfall is 3153 mm. The wettest month is December, with an average of 381 mm rainfall, and the driest is June, with 126 mm rainfall.

== See also ==
- List of drainage basins of Indonesia
- List of rivers of Indonesia
- List of rivers of Sumatra
