= Kualuh River =

Coordinates: 2.75°N 100.0°E

Kualuh River Sungai Kualuh, Air Kualuh, Soengai Koealoe
- Location of river mouth Kualuh River (Indonesia)

Location
- Country: Indonesia

Physical characteristics
- Source
  - location: North Sumatra
- Mouth: Malacca Strait
- Basin size: 4,278 km^{2} (1,652 sq mi)

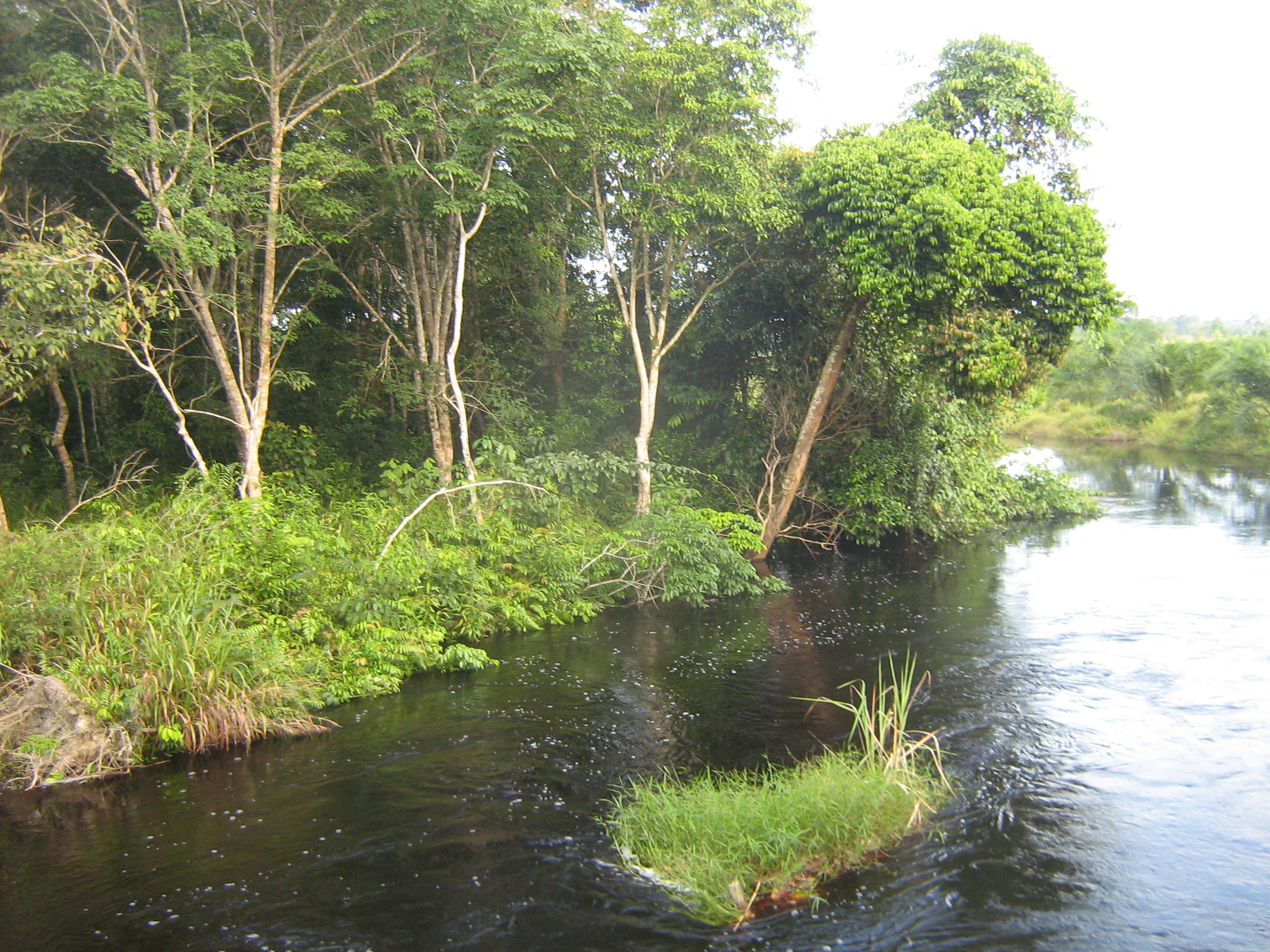
Kualuh River.

The Kualuh River is a river in northern Sumatra, Indonesia, about 1600 km northwest of the national capital Jakarta. The drainage area of 4,278 km^{2} is mostly situated in North Labuhanbatu Regency of North Sumatra Province.

== Geography ==
The river flows in the northern area of Sumatra with predominantly tropical rainforest climate (designated as Af in the Köppen-Geiger climate classification). The annual average temperature in the area is 21 °C. The warmest month is March, when the average temperature is around 26 °C, and the coldest is October, at 20 °C. The average annual rainfall is 3,730 mm. October is the wettest month with an average of 491 mm rainfall, and March is the driest, with 136 mm rain on average.

== See also ==
- List of drainage basins of Indonesia
- List of rivers of Indonesia
- List of rivers of Sumatra
