= Musi River (Indonesia) =

River in Sumatra, Indonesia

Musi River Sungai Musi, Air Musi, Musi River, Palembang River, Sungai Palembang, Air Moesi, Kali Musi
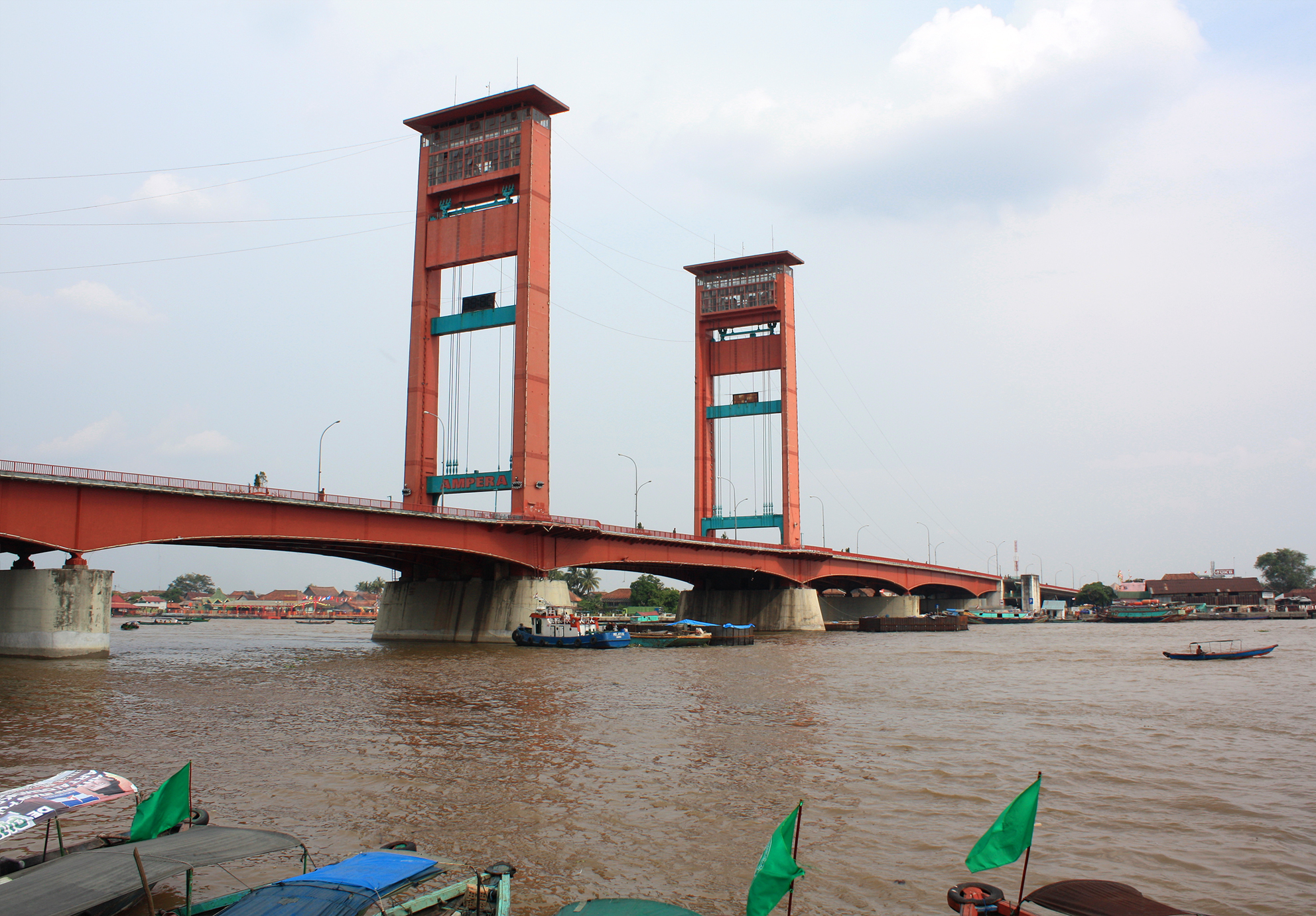
- Ampera Bridge over the Musi River

- Location of river mouth Musi River (Indonesia) (Indonesia)

Location
- Country: South Sumatra, Indonesia

Physical characteristics
- Source
  - location: Barisan Mountains, Kepahiang, Bengkulu
  - coordinates: 3°24′21.528″S 102°35′53.1204″E
  - elevation: 1,300 m (4,300 ft)
- Mouth
  - location: Bangka Strait, South China Sea, South Sumatra
  - coordinates: 2°19′51.7224″S 104°55′19.9668″E
  - elevation: 0 m (0 ft)
- Length: 759 km (472 mi)
- Basin size: 56,931 km^{2} (21,981 mi^{2}) 59,942 km^{2} (23,144 mi^{2})
- Width
  - minimum: 250 m (820 ft) (Palembang)
  - average: 540 m (1,770 ft) (Palembang)
  - maximum: 1,350 m (4,430 ft) (Palembang)
- Depth
  - average: 8 m (26 ft)(Palembang)
- Discharge
  - location: Musi Delta, Bangka Strait
  - average: (Period: 1992–2016)3,054 m^{3}/s (107,900 cu ft/s) (Period: 2016–2020)3,066 m^{3}/s (108,300 cu ft/s) (Period: 1971–2000)3,211.2 m^{3}/s (113,400 cu ft/s) (Period: 2009–2013)3,961 m^{3}/s (139,900 cu ft/s)
- Discharge
  - location: Palembang, (Confluence of Komering, 78 km upstream of mouth; Basin size: 53,500 km^{2} (20,700 sq mi)
  - average: (Period: 1971–2000)2,953.7 m^{3}/s (104,310 cu ft/s) 2,700 m^{3}/s (95,000 cu ft/s)
  - minimum: 1,400 m^{3}/s (49,000 cu ft/s)
  - maximum: 4,200 m^{3}/s (150,000 cu ft/s)
- Discharge
  - location: Sekayu (Basin size: 21,146.3 km^{2} (8,164.6 sq mi))
  - average: (Period: 1971–2000)1,205.4 m^{3}/s (42,570 cu ft/s)
- Discharge
  - location: Tebing Tinggi (Basin size: 3,329.7 km^{2} (1,285.6 sq mi)
  - average: (Period: 1971–2000)183.6 m^{3}/s (6,480 cu ft/s)

Basin features
- Progression: South China Sea
- River system: Musi River
- Tributaries
  - left: Kungku, Klingi, Lakitan, Rawas, Harileko, Sebalik
  - right: Keru, Nibung, Lintang, Kikim, Semangus, Keruh, Langgaran, Medak, Simpang, Dua, Penukal, Lematang, Belida, Kramasan, Ogan, Komering

The Musi River (Indonesian: Sungai Musi) is a river in Southern Sumatra, Indonesia. It flows from south-west to north-east, from the Barisan Mountains range that form the backbone of Sumatra, in Kepahiang Regency, Bengkulu Province, to the Bangka Strait that forms an extension of the South China Sea. The Musi is about 750 kilometers long, and drains most of South Sumatra province. After flowing through Palembang, the provincial capital, it joins with several other rivers, including the Banyuasin River, to form a delta near the town of Sungsang. The river, dredged to a depth of about 8 meters, is navigable by large ships as far as Palembang, which is the site of major port facilities used primarily for the export of petroleum, rubber and palm oil.

This river system, especially around the city of Palembang, was the heart of eponymous 7th to 13th century Srivijayan empire. The river mouth was the site of the SilkAir Flight 185 plane crash which killed all 104 passengers and crew on board in 1997.

== Geography ==
The river flows in the southern area of Sumatra, which has a predominantly tropical rainforest climate (designated as Af in the Köppen-Geiger climate classification). The annual average temperature in the area is 24 °C. The warmest month is July, when the average temperature is around 26 °C, and the coldest is February, at 22 °C. The average annual rainfall is 2579 mm. The wettest month is April, with an average of 344 mm rainfall, and the driest is September, with 99 mm of rain.

== Tributaries ==
The main tributaries from the mouth:

Left tributary	Right tributary	Length (km)	Basin size (km^{2})	Average discharge (m^{3}/s)
Musi		759	59,942	3,211.2
Sebalik			282.6	14.6
	Komering	328	9,908	458.7
	Ogan	313	8,233	432.9
	Kramasan		241.6	11.6
	Belida		462.7	23.1
	Lematang	348	7,340	396.1
	Penukal		959.5	52.8
Harileko		334	3,746	186.7
	Dua		317	17.5
	Simpang		368	20.7
	Medak	72	395.3	25.7
	Langgaran		226	12.8
	Keruh		554.2	31.9
Rawas		208	5,841	333.9
Lakitan		140	2,763	161.2
	Semangus	183	1,933	125.3
Kelingi		98	1,898	126.9
Kungku			667.1	38.6
	Kikim		1,524.1	86.8
	Lintang		572	31.9
	Keru		315.3	18.1

== Gallery ==
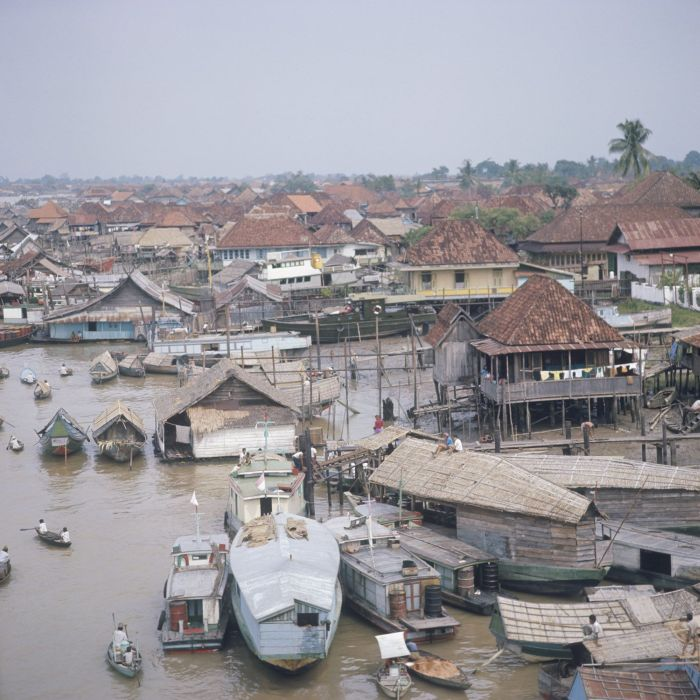
The Musi River and Palembang

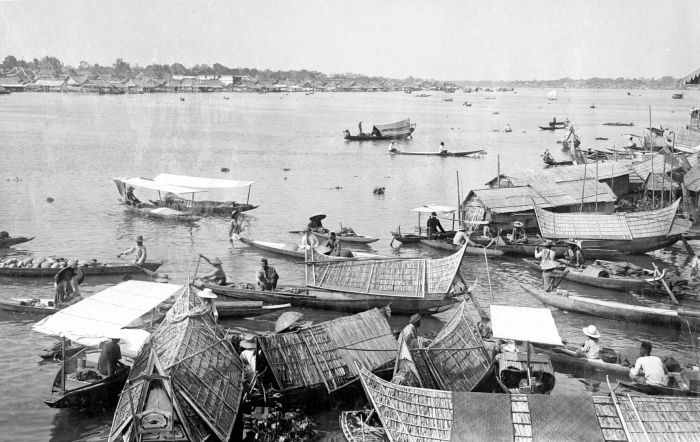
The Musi River by Palembang

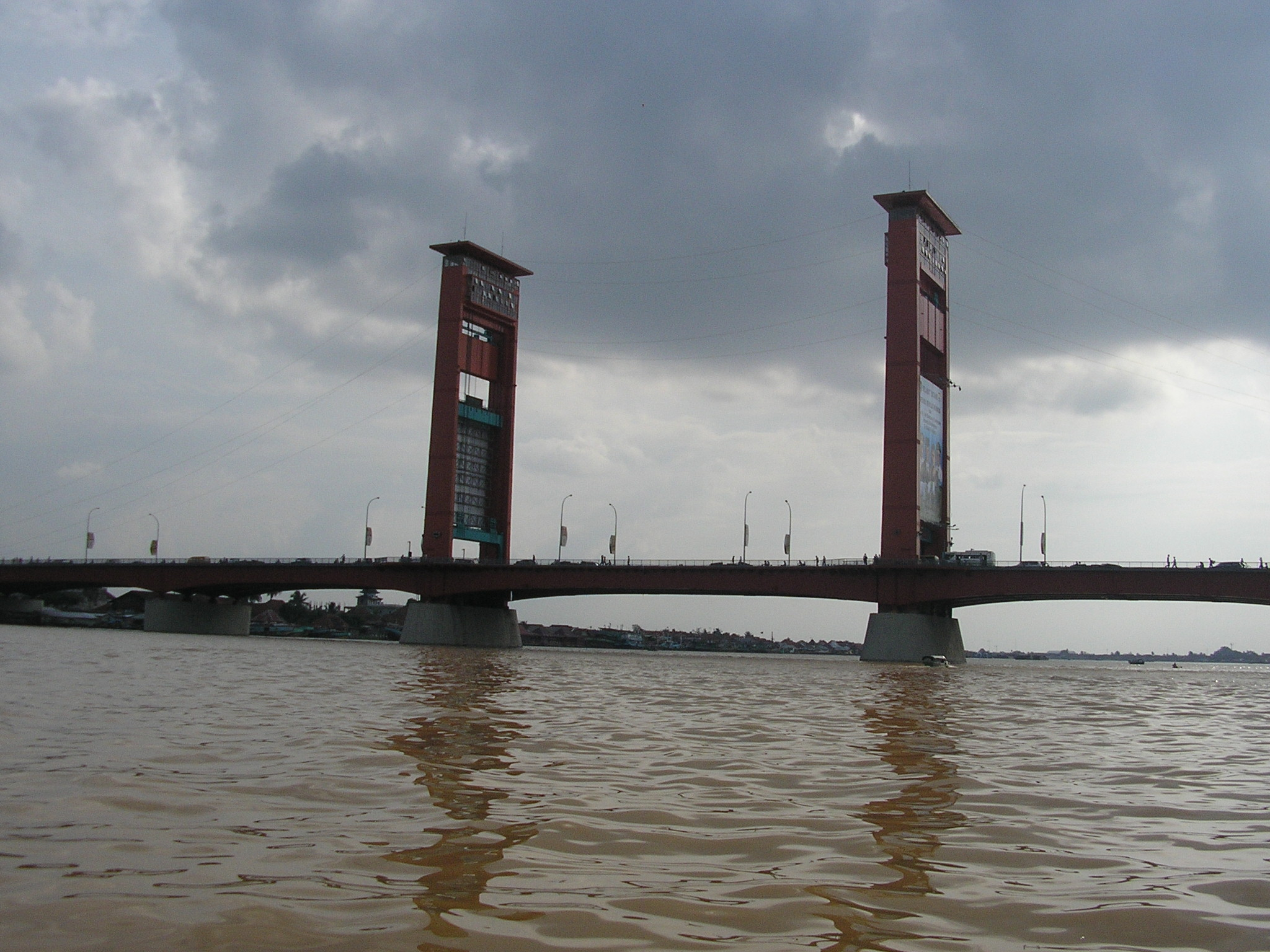
The Ampera Bridge on Musi River, Palembang

watershed of the Musi River

== See also ==
- List of drainage basins of Indonesia
- List of rivers of Indonesia
- List of rivers of Sumatra
