= Kumu River =

Coordinates: 0.9142°N 100.2852°E

Kumu River Sungai Kumu
- Location of river mouth Kumu River (Indonesia)

Location
- Country: Indonesia
- Province: Riau

Physical characteristics
- Source: Bukit Barisan
  - location: Koto Nopan, Pasaman Regency
  - elevation: 450 m (1,480 ft)
- Mouth: Rokan River

Basin features
- River system: Rokan basin

Kumu River is a river in Riau province, central-eastern Sumatra, Indonesia, about 1,100 km northwest of the capital Jakarta. It is a tributary of the Rokan River.

== Geography ==
The river flows in the central area of Sumatra which has a predominantly tropical rainforest climate (designated as Af in the Köppen-Geiger climate classification). The annual average temperature in the area is 23 °C. The warmest month is March, when the average temperature is around 24 °C, and the coldest is January, at 22 °C. The average annual rainfall is 3766 mm. The wettest month is November, with an average of 336 mm rainfall, and the driest is July, with 113 mm rainfall.

== See also ==
- List of drainage basins of Indonesia
- List of rivers of Indonesia
- List of rivers of Sumatra
