= Mandau River (Indonesia) =

Coordinates: 0.8°N 101.78333°E

Mandau River Sungai Mandau
- Location of river mouth Mandau River (Indonesia) (Indonesia)

Location
- Country: Indonesia

Physical characteristics
- Source
  - location: Sumatra
- Mouth: Siak River

Mandau River is a river in Riau province of central Sumatra island, Indonesia, about 1,000 km northwest of the capital Jakarta. It is a tributary of the Siak River.

== Geography ==
The river flows in the central area of Sumatra which has a predominantly tropical rainforest climate (designated as Af in the Köppen-Geiger climate classification). The annual average temperature in the area is 23 °C. The warmest month is August, when the average temperature is around 24 °C, and the coldest is January, at 22 °C. The average annual rainfall is 2899 mm. The wettest month is November, with an average of 403 mm rainfall, and the driest is June, with 115 mm of rain.

== See also ==
- List of drainage basins of Indonesia
- List of rivers of Indonesia
- List of rivers of Sumatra
