= Ogan River =

Ogan River Sungai Ogan, Air Ogan, Aek Ogan
- Location of river mouth Ogan River (Indonesia)

Location
- Country: Indonesia

Physical characteristics
- Source: Lake Ranau, Barisan Mountains
  - location: South Ogan Komering Ulu Regency
  - coordinates: 4.8674°S 103.93226°E
  - elevation: 550 m (1,800 ft)
- Mouth: Musi River (Indonesia)
  - location: Kertapati, Palembang
  - coordinates: 3.013011°S 104.750270°E

Basin features
- River system: Musi basin

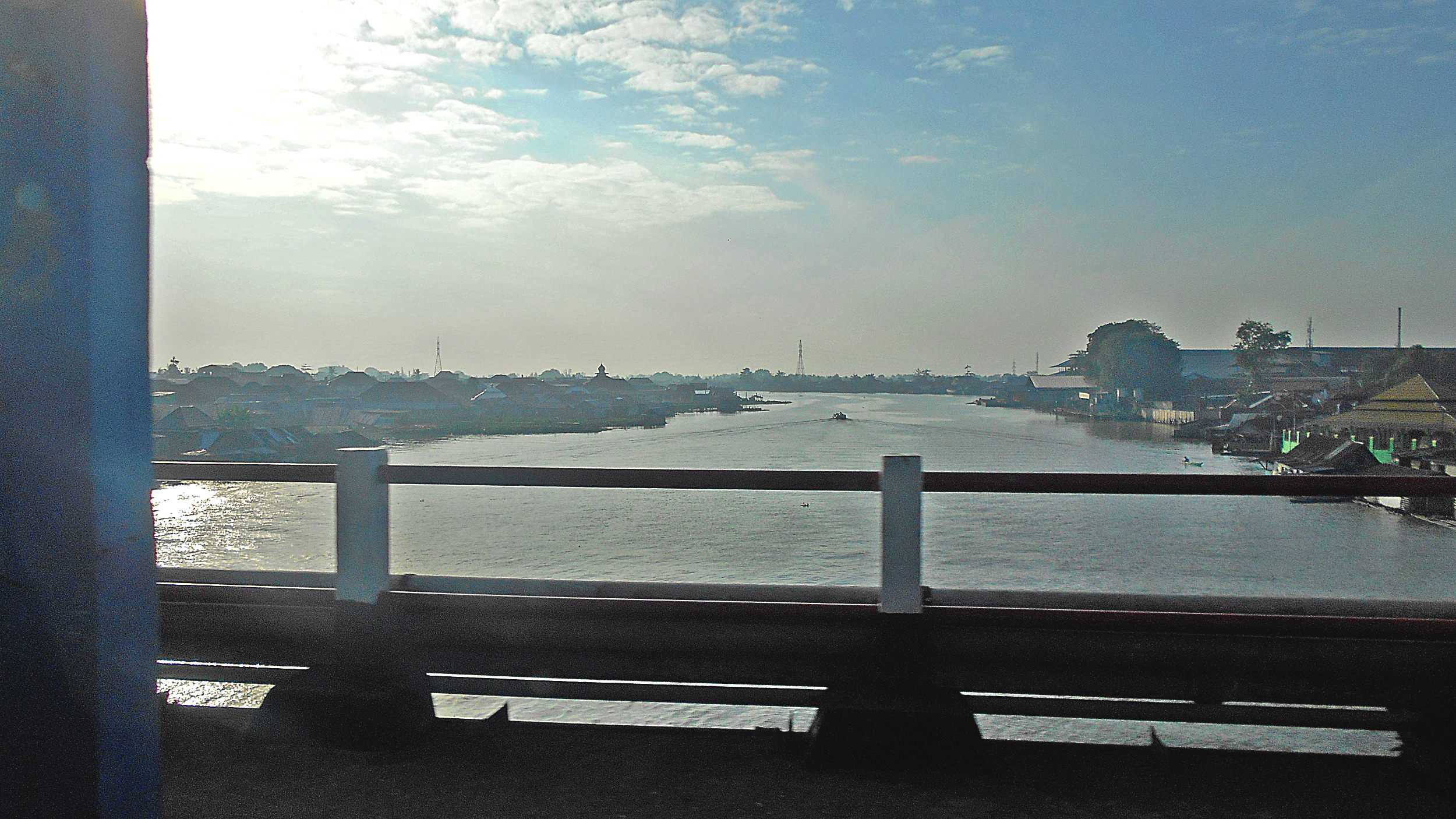

The Ogan River is a river in South Sumatra, Indonesia. It is a tributary of the Musi River in Southern Sumatra. Flowing entirely in the South Sumatra province, it rises in Barisan Mountains (Bukit Barisan) and meanders slowly eastwards to join the Musi at Kertapati, Palembang. The Ogan ranks as the third longest river in South Sumatra (behind Musi and Komering). The river either borders or flows through the regencies of South OKU, OKU, OKI, and Ogan Ilir.

The Ogan and Pegagan tribes lived along the Ogan and its tributaries. Most were peasant or merchant. The river served first as vital transportation artery and communications link. Formed from thick layers of this river's silt deposits, the Ogan River Valley is one of the most fertile agricultural regions of the province.

== Geography ==
The river flows in the southern area of Sumatra with predominantly tropical rainforest climate (designated as Af in the Köppen–Geiger climate classification). The annual average temperature in the area is 24 °C. The warmest month is October, when the average temperature is around 26 °C, and the coldest is January, at 22 °C. The average annual rainfall is 2902 mm. The wettest month is November, with an average of 435 mm rainfall, and the driest is August, with 83 mm rainfall.

Ogan River

Climate chart (precipitation, max. and min. temperature)
J	F	M	A	M	J	J	A	S	O	N	D
341 25 20	275 25 21	326 26 21	363 26 22	161 26 21	128 27 22	146 26 21	83 26 21	83 29 20	171 31 21	435 29 21	389 26 22
- █ Average max. and min. temperatures in °C
- █ Precipitation totals in mm
Imperial conversion
J	F	M	A	M	J	J	A	S	O	N	D
13 77 68	11 77 70	13 79 70	14 79 72	6.3 79 70	5 81 72	5.7 79 70	3.3 79 70	3.3 84 68	6.7 88 70	17 84 70	15 79 72
- █ Average max. and min. temperatures in °F
- █ Precipitation totals in inches

== See also ==
- List of drainage basins of Indonesia
- List of rivers of Indonesia
- List of rivers of Sumatra
