= Rokan-kanan River =

Coordinates: 1.39662°N 100.93419°E

Rokan-kanan River Sungai Rokan Kanan
- Location of river mouth Rokan-kanan River (Indonesia)

Location
- Country: Indonesia

Physical characteristics
- Source
  - location: Sumatra
- Mouth: Rokan River

Rokan-kanan River is a river in Riau province, in central part of Sumatra island, Indonesia, about 1,100 km northwest of the capital Jakarta. It is a tributary of the Rokan River.

== Geography ==
The river flows in the central area of Sumatra, which is a predominantly tropical rainforest climate (designated as Af in the Köppen-Geiger climate classification). The annual average temperature in the area is 23 °C. The warmest month is August, when the average temperature is around 24 °C, and the coldest is January, at 22 °C. The average annual rainfall is 2742 mm. The wettest month is November, with an average of 401 mm rainfall, and the driest is June, with 85 mm rainfall.

== See also ==
- List of drainage basins of Indonesia
- List of rivers of Indonesia
- List of rivers of Sumatra
