= Peusangan River =

River in Indonesia

Coordinates: 5.26333°N 96.85528°E

Peusangan River Krueng Peusangan, Sungai Peusangan, Kroeng Tingkeuem, Krueng Peusaguan
- Location of river mouth Peusangan River (Sumatra) Peusangan River (Indonesia)

Location
- Country: Indonesia

Physical characteristics
- Source
  - location: Aceh, Sumatra

Peusangan River is a river in Sumatra, in the western part of Indonesia, about 1,700 km northwest of the capital Jakarta.

== Geography ==
The river flows in the northern area of Sumatra which has a predominantly tropical rainforest climate (designated as Af in the Köppen-Geiger climate classification). The annual average temperature in the area is 25 °C. The warmest month is July, when the average temperature is around 27 °C, and the coldest is January, at 24 °C. The average annual rainfall is 2,431 mm. The wettest month is December, with an average of 415 mm rainfall, and the driest is July, with 106 mm rainfall.

== See also ==
- List of drainage basins of Indonesia
- List of rivers of Indonesia
- List of rivers of Sumatra
