= Rawas River =

Coordinates: 2.7063°S 103.3999°E

Rawas River Sungai Rawas, Air Rawas, Batang Air Rawas
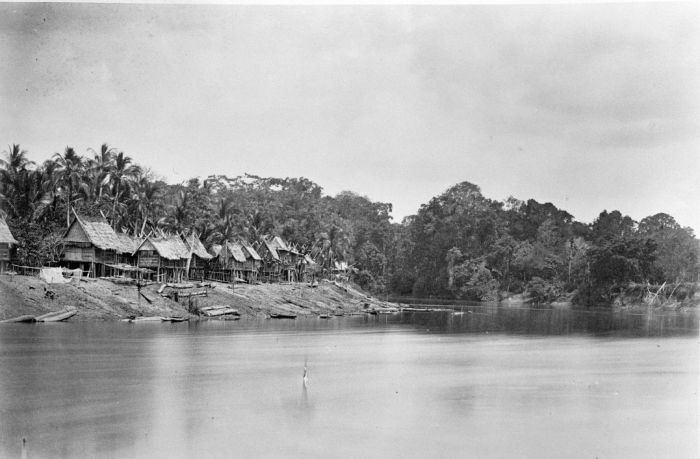
- The Rawas River at Bien Gien Telok, Rawas district, Sumatra

- Location of river mouth Rawas River (Indonesia)

Location
- Country: Indonesia

Physical characteristics
- Source
  - location: Sumatra
- Mouth: Musi River

Basin features
- Tributaries
  - left: Simpang-kanan River

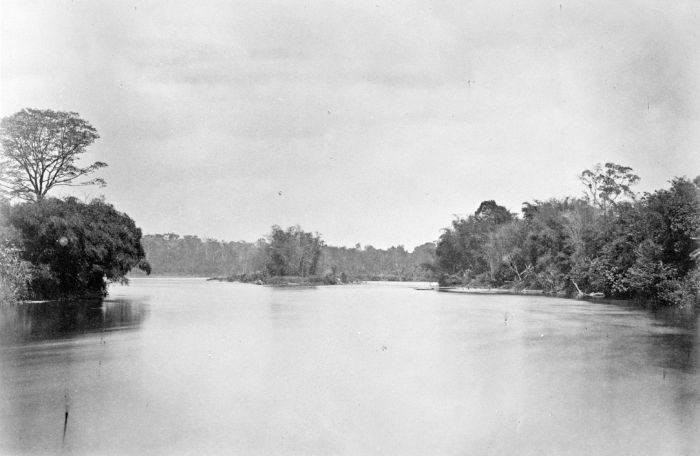
Batang River in the Soeroelangoen district, Rawas, Sumatra

The Rawas River is a river in northern Sumatra, Indonesia, about 500 km (300 mi) northwest of the capital Jakarta It is a tributary of the Musi River.

== Geography ==
The river flows in the southern area of Sumatra which has a predominantly tropical rainforest climate (designated as Af in the Köppen–Geiger climate classification). The annual average temperature in the area is 23 °C (73 °F). The warmest month is October, when the average temperature is around 24 °C (75 °F), and the coldest is June, at 22 °C (72 °F). The average annual rainfall is 3,546 mm (139.6 in). The wettest month is December, with an average of 482 mm (19.0 in) rainfall, and the driest is June, with 115 mm (4.5 in) of rain.

== See also ==
- List of drainage basins of Indonesia
- List of rivers of Indonesia
- List of rivers of Sumatra
