= Jamboaye River =

Jamboaye River Krueng Jamboaye, Sungai Jamboaye, Krueng Jambuaye, Krueng Djamboaje
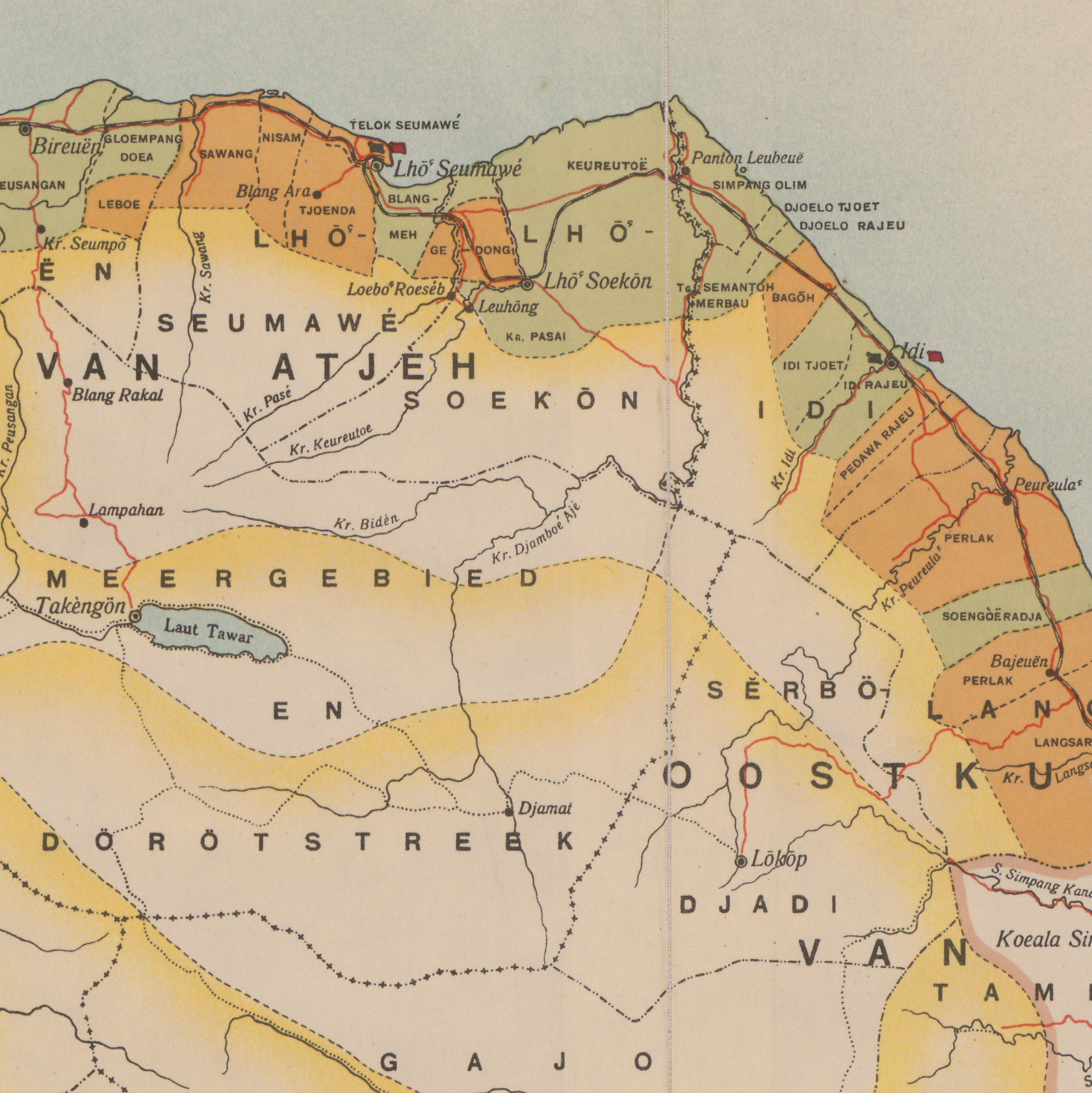
- Krueng Jamboaye on the 1917 map of Aceh

Location
- Country: Indonesia

Physical characteristics
- Source
  - location: Aceh, Sumatra
- Mouth: Malacca Strait
  - coordinates: 5.24310°N 97.48358°E
- Basin size: 4,640 km^{2} (1,790 sq mi)

Basin features
- River system: DAS Jambo Aye
- Bridges: Teupin Bate bridge; Ara Kundo bridge
- Mouth of Krueng JamboAye

The Jamboaye River is a river in the province of Aceh in northern Sumatra, Indonesia, about 1,600 km northwest of the capital Jakarta.

Krueng Jambo Aye is a major river of the Jambo Aye River Basin, covering an area of approximately 4,640 km^{2} (1,790 sq mi) with a perimeter of 539 km (335 mi). It spans parts of Aceh Tengah Regency, Bener Meriah Regency, Aceh Timur Regency, and Aceh Utara Regency. The topography of the Jambo Aye River Basin is predominantly mountainous with steep slopes, particularly in the upper and middle regions, which are located in Aceh Tengah Regency and Bener Meriah Regency.

== Geography ==
The river flows in the northern area of Sumatra which has a predominantly tropical rainforest climate (designated as Af in the Köppen-Geiger climate classification). The annual average temperature in the area is 24 °C. The warmest month is April, when the average temperature is around 26 °C, and the coldest is December, at 22 °C. The average annual rainfall is 3766 mm. The wettest month is December, with an average of 651 mm rainfall, and the driest is June, with 137 mm rainfall.

== See also ==
- List of drainage basins of Indonesia
- List of rivers of Indonesia
- List of rivers of Sumatra
