= Kampar Kiri River =

Coordinates: 0.2702°N 101.6787°E

Kampar Kiri River Sungai Kampar Kiri, Sungai Kamparkiri, Sungai Subayang, Sungai Gunung Sahilan, Kamparkiri
- Location of river mouth Kampar Kiri River (Indonesia)

Location
- Country: Indonesia
- Province: West Sumatra, Riau

Physical characteristics
- Source
  - location: Sumatra

The Kampar Kiri River is a river in central Sumatra, Indonesia, about 900 km northwest of the capital Jakarta. It is a tributary of the Kampar River.

== Hydrology ==
The upstream of the Kampar Kiri River is known as the "Subayang River", which is the largest water body in the district of Kampar Kiri, Kampar Regency, province of Riau. The Subayang River rises in the province of West Sumatra, collecting water from smaller rivers, such as the Bio River and others. The downstream part is called the Kampar Kiri River and also Gunung Sahilan River.

During wet seasons, the high rainfall causes the Kampar Kiri River to flood the surrounding area, especially with the addition of high discharge from the Subayang River in its upstream.

== Geography ==
The river flows in the central area of Sumatra with predominantly tropical rainforest climate (designated as Af in the Köppen–Geiger climate classification). The annual average temperature in the area is 23 °C. The warmest month is May, when the average temperature is around 24 °C, and the coldest is January, at 22 °C. The average annual rainfall is 3007 mm. The wettest month is November, with an average of 443 mm rainfall, and the driest is June, with 137 mm rainfall.

== See also ==
- List of drainage basins of Indonesia
- List of rivers of Indonesia
- List of rivers of Sumatra
