= Komering River =

Coordinates: 2.988°S 104.8321°E

Komering River Sungai Komering, Air Komering
- Location of river mouth Komering River (Indonesia)

Location
- Country: Indonesia

Physical characteristics
- Source
  - location: South Sumatra
- Mouth: Musi River (Indonesia)
  - location: Palembang

Basin features
- River system: Musi basin

The Komering River is a river in South Sumatra, Indonesia. It is a tributary of the Musi River.

== Geography ==
The river flows in the southern area of Sumatra which has a predominantly tropical rainforest climate (designated as Af in the Köppen–Geiger climate classification). The annual average temperature in the area is 24 °C. The warmest month is October, with the average temperature of 26 °C, and the coldest is January, at 22 °C. The average annual rainfall is 2,902 mm. The wettest month is November, with an average of 435 mm rainfall, and the driest is August, with 83 mm rainfall.

Komering River

Climate chart (precipitation, max. and min. temperature)
J	F	M	A	M	J	J	A	S	O	N	D
341 25 20	275 25 21	326 26 21	363 26 22	161 26 21	128 27 22	146 26 21	83 26 21	83 29 20	171 31 21	435 29 21	389 26 22
- █ Average max. and min. temperatures in °C
- █ Precipitation totals in mm
Imperial conversion
J	F	M	A	M	J	J	A	S	O	N	D
13 77 68	11 77 70	13 79 70	14 79 72	6.3 79 70	5 81 72	5.7 79 70	3.3 79 70	3.3 84 68	6.7 88 70	17 84 70	15 79 72
- █ Average max. and min. temperatures in °F
- █ Precipitation totals in inches

== See also ==
- List of drainage basins of Indonesia
- List of rivers of Indonesia
- List of rivers of Sumatra
