= Tamiang River =

River in Indonesia

Coordinates: 4.41667°N 98.26667°E

Tamiang River Sungai Tamiang, Tamiang Rivier
- Location of river mouth Tamiang River (Sumatra) Tamiang River (Indonesia)

Location
- Country: Indonesia

Physical characteristics
- Source
  - location: Aceh, Sumatra

Tamiang River is a river in the province of Aceh, northern Sumatra, Indonesia,

== Geography ==
The river flows in the northern area of Sumatra with predominantly tropical rainforest climate (designated as Af in the Köppen-Geiger climate classification). The annual average temperature in the area is 23 °C. The warmest month is June, when the average temperature is around 27 °C, and the coldest is October, at 22 °C. The average annual rainfall is 3483 mm. The wettest month is December, with an average of 522 mm rainfall, and the driest is March, with 178 mm rainfall.

== See also ==
- List of drainage basins of Indonesia
- List of rivers of Indonesia
- List of rivers of Sumatra
