= Mesuji River =

Coordinates: 4.15853°S 105.82139°E

- Location of river mouth Mesuji River (Indonesia)

Location
- Country: Indonesia

Physical characteristics
- Source
  - location: Lampung, Sumatra
- Mouth: Java Sea

Mesuji River is a river in Lampung province, Sumatra island, Indonesia, about 250 km northwest of the capital Jakarta.

== Geography ==
The river flows in the southeast area of Sumatra, which has a predominantly tropical rainforest climate (designated as Af in the Köppen-Geiger climate classification). The annual average temperature in the area is 26 °C. The warmest month is August, when the average temperature is around 28 °C, and the coldest is May, at 25 °C. The average annual rainfall is 3,248 mm. The wettest month being December, with an average of 547 mm rainfall, and the driest is September, with 40 mm of rain.

== See also ==
- List of drainage basins of Indonesia
- List of rivers of Indonesia
- List of rivers of Sumatra
