= Woyla River =

Coordinates: 4°16′16″N 95°58′01″E

Woyla River Sungai Woyla, Krueng Wolya, Kroeeng Wolja, Kroeëng Wovla, Krueng Wayla, Krueng Wojla, Krueng Woyla
- Location of river mouth Woyla River (Sumatra) Woyla River (Indonesia)

Location
- Country: Indonesia

Physical characteristics
- Source
  - location: Aceh

The Woyla River is a river in West Aceh Regency in northwestern Sumatra, Indonesia, about 1700 km northwest of the capital, Jakarta.

== Hydrology ==
Located on the western shore of Sumatra, the Woyla River was strongly affected by the 2004 Indian Ocean earthquake and tsunami. Its smaller, northern outlet, a closed outlet before the tsunami, was re-opened in April 2005 to be closed again in June 2006. The larger, southern outlet, which existed before the tsunami and has been widened by it, is migrating north, since its northern bank is being eroded while sediments are being deposited along its southern bank.

== Ecology ==
Fish diversity is low in the Woyla River, but the genus Tor or Keureling, a popular fish in Aceh locally known as the "king of the river", is represented by T. tambroides in the lower streams of the river.

== Geography ==
The river flows in the northern area of Sumatra with a predominantly tropical rainforest climate (designated as Af in the Köppen-Geiger climate classification). The annual average temperature in the area is 23 °C. The warmest month is February, when the average temperature is around 24 °C, and the coldest is June, at 22 °C. The average annual rainfall is 3355 mm. The wettest month is November, with an average of 431 mm rainfall, and the driest is July, with 133 mm rainfall.

== See also ==
- List of drainage basins of Indonesia
- Barisan Mountains
- List of rivers of Indonesia
- List of rivers of Sumatra
