= Silau River =

Coordinates: 2.96667°N 99.8°E

Silau River Sungai Silau, Aek Silau, Air Silau
- Location of river mouth Silau River (Indonesia)

Location
- Country: Indonesia

Physical characteristics
- Source
  - location: Sumatra
- Mouth: Asahan River
  - location: Tanjung Balai, North Sumatra

Silau River is a river in northern Sumatra, Indonesia, about 1300 km northwest of the capital Jakarta. It is a tributary of Asahan River.

== Geography ==
The river flows in the northern area of Sumatra with predominantly tropical rainforest climate (designated as Af in the Köppen-Geiger climate classification). The annual average temperature in the area is 24 °C. The warmest month is June, when the average temperature is around 26 °C, and the coldest is January, at 23 °C. The average annual rainfall is 2950 mm. The wettest month is November, with an average of 381 mm rainfall, and the driest is June, with 117 mm rainfall.

== See also ==
- List of drainage basins of Indonesia
- List of rivers of Indonesia
- List of rivers of Sumatra
