= Kampar River =

Kampar River Sungai Kampar
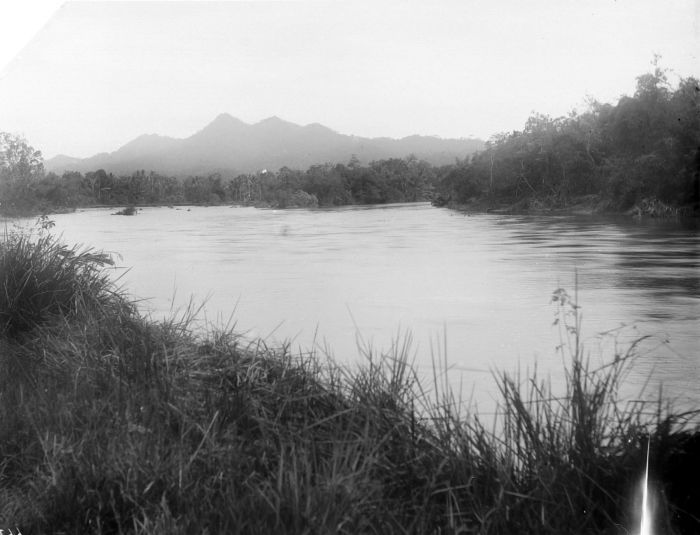
- The Kampar River near Muara Takus, a historical Buddhist temple complex thought to belong to the Sriwijaya empire

- Location of river mouth Kampar River (Indonesia)
- Native name: Batang Kampar (Indonesian)

Location
- Country: Indonesia
- Province: Riau, West Sumatra
- District: Pelalawan Regency, Kampar Regency, Kuantan Singingi Regency, Lima Puluh Kota, Sijunjung Regency

Physical characteristics
- Source
  - location: Lima Puluh Kota and Sijunjung Regency, West Sumatra
- Mouth
  - location: Kuala Kampar, Pelalawan Regency, Riau
  - coordinates: 0.469°N 103.145°E
- Length: 413.5 km (256.9 mi)
- Basin size: 26,038 km^{2} (10,053 mi^{2})
- Discharge
  - location: Kampar Delta, Malacca Strait
  - average: 1,351 m^{3}/s (47,700 cu ft/s) (Period of data: 2009–2013)2,063 m^{3}/s (72,900 cu ft/s)

Basin features
- Tributaries
  - left: Kampar Kiri River
  - right: Kampar Kanan River

The Kampar River is on the island of Sumatra in Indonesia, about 800 km northwest of the capital Jakarta. It is a well-known river surfing destination because of its tidal bore, known as Bono.

== Course ==
The river originates in the Barisan Mountains of West Sumatra and flows to the island's eastern coast, emptying into the Malacca Strait, directly opposite Singapore. It is the confluence of two tributaries of almost equal size: the Kampar Kanan River (or Right Kampar) and the Kampar Kiri River (or Left Kampar). The Kampar Kanan River passes through Lima Puluh Kota Regency and Kampar Regency, while the Kampar Kiri River through Sijunjung Regency, Kuantan Singingi Regency, and Kampar Regency. The tributaries meet in the Langgam District of Pelalawan Regency before flowing into the Malacca Strait as the Kampar River.

Koto Panjang, an artificial lake upstream of the river, is the reservoir for a hydroelectric generating plant with a capacity of 114 MW.

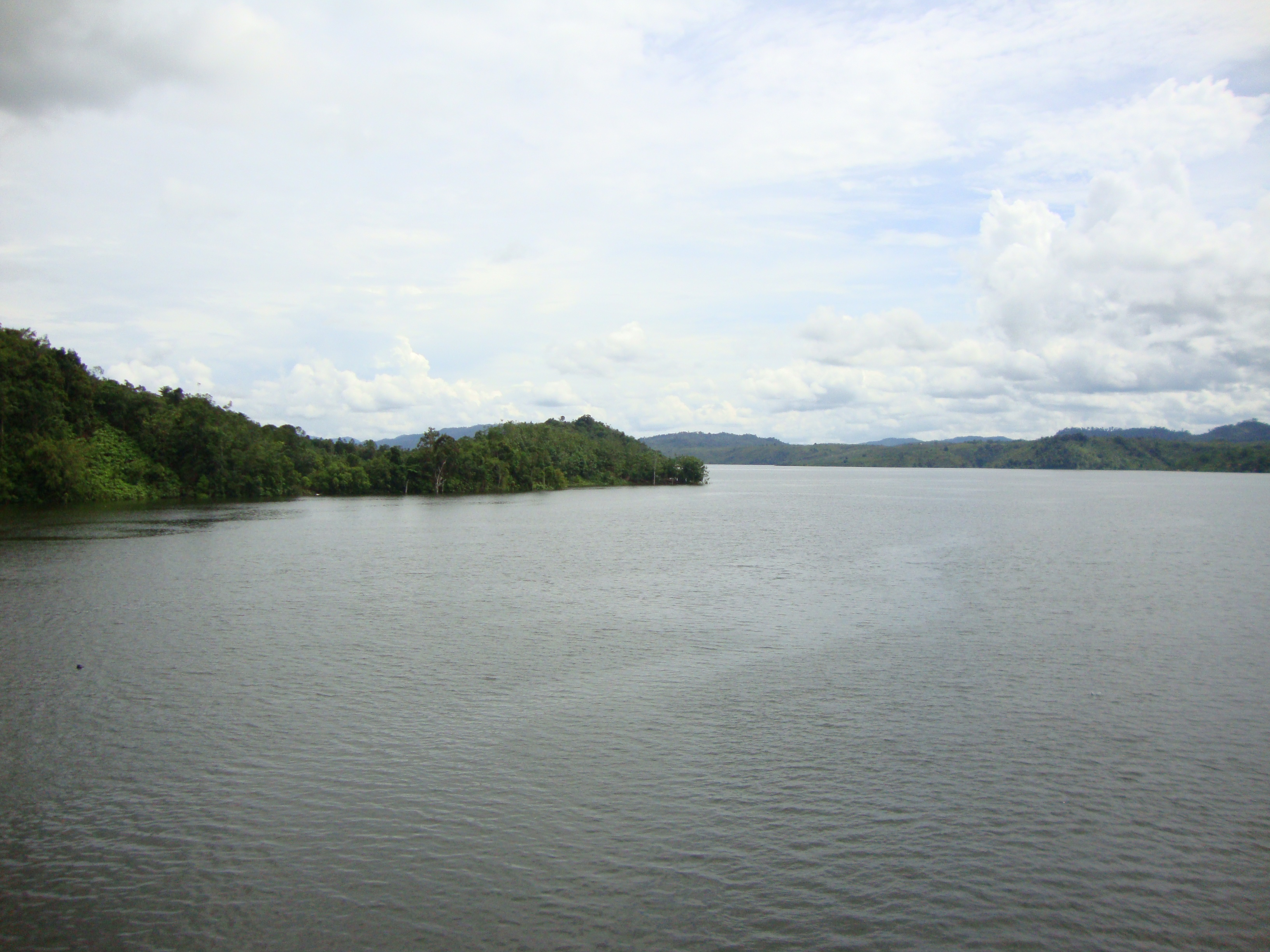
The hydropower lake of Koto Panjang

== Tidal bore ==
A large tidal bore that can include breaking waves occurs on the river. It is known as Bono, which means true.

The river widens as it approaches the sea, and its water volume increases as it is joined by tributaries. During the rainy season, normally November to December, the volume is greatly increased, and the shallow estuary becomes even wider. Upstream the river's cross-section changes suddenly, becoming much narrower. The bore is caused by sea water from a high tide flowing upstream from the wide, shallow estuary into the rapidly narrowing channel, meeting the river water flowing downstream.

The waves can travel from the sea at speeds of up to 40 kilometres per hour (25 mph), and when sea water at full tide combines with heavy rain upstream they can reach a height of 4–6 metres (13–20 ft), accompanied by a loud roaring sound and strong winds. Bono waves can persist for four hours or more, and travel as far upstream as Tanjung Pungai, Meranti, Pelalawan Regency, 60 kilometres (37 mi) inland. Bono is not just one wave but a series of many, sometimes on the left and right river banks and at other times in the middle of the river.

The large number of ships sunk in the Kampar River's estuary has been attributed to the Bono waves, called by locals as "Seven Ghosts", considered to be the incarnation of the seven evil spirits. Although they still used the river as the ground for boating agility tests.

The bore is used for river surfing. Surfing the Bono waves is difficult, owing to the quantity of mud in the river. The river is inhabited by crocodiles, so surfers are usually escorted by rescue boats for their safety.

The Bono wave can be seen at a number of places on the river, such as Tanjung Sebayang, Pulau Muda, Teluk Meranti and Tanjung Pungai, all in Pelalawan Regency. The area can be reached from Pangkalan Kerinci within 4 hours by car, or 3 hours by speedboat. Pangkalan Kerinci can be reached within 90 minutes by car from Pekanbaru or Pekanbaru international airport. The river can also be reached from nearby Singapore.

The Bono area is not far from Tesso Nilo National Park and Kerumutan Natural Reserve and local government planned to extend the Bono tourist attraction with ecotourism.

== Geography ==
The river flows in the central area of Sumatra with predominantly tropical rainforest climate (designated as Af in the Köppen-Geiger climate classification). The annual average temperature in the area is 24 °C. The warmest month is October, when the average temperature is around 26 °C, and the coldest is November, at 22 °C. The average annual rainfall is 2667 mm. The wettest month is November, with an average of 402 mm rainfall, and the driest is June, with 104 mm rainfall.

Kampar River

Climate chart (precipitation, max. and min. temperature)
J	F	M	A	M	J	J	A	S	O	N	D
112 25 22	261 26 22	225 27 22	276 25 21	244 25 22	104 26 22	217 26 22	149 26 21	173 28 21	208 29 22	402 24 21	297 26 22
- █ Average max. and min. temperatures in °C
- █ Precipitation totals in mm
Imperial conversion
J	F	M	A	M	J	J	A	S	O	N	D
4.4 77 72	10 79 72	8.9 81 72	11 77 70	9.6 77 72	4.1 79 72	8.5 79 72	5.9 79 70	6.8 82 70	8.2 84 72	16 75 70	12 79 72
- █ Average max. and min. temperatures in °F
- █ Precipitation totals in inches

== See also ==
- List of drainage basins of Indonesia
- List of rivers of Indonesia
- List of rivers of Sumatra
