= Renun River =

Coordinates: 3.0816°N 97.9142°E

Renun River Lae Renun, Lawe Renun, Sungai Renun, Lao Renoen, Lae Renoen, Lau Renun
- Location of river mouth Renun River (Sumatra) Renun River (Indonesia)

Location
- Country: Indonesia

Physical characteristics
- Source
  - location: North Sumatra
- Mouth
  - location: Aceh

Renun River is a river in northern Sumatra, Indonesia, about 1,400 km northwest of the capital Jakarta.

== Geography ==
The river flows in the northern area of Sumatra which has a predominantly tropical rainforest climate (designated as Af in the Köppen-Geiger climate classification). The annual average temperature in the area is 22 °C. March is the warmest month with the average temperature around 23 °C, and the coldest is June, at 21 °C. The average annual rainfall is 3119 mm. The wettest month is December, with an average of 373 mm rainfall, and the driest is July, with 131 mm rainfall.

== Uses ==
The Renun hydroelectric power plant was built in Lae Rias Tor Nauli, one of 14 hamlets in Pegagan Julu IV Village, Sumbul District, Dairi Regency, North Sumatra Province, about 3.5 hours drive from Medan City. This project utilizes the water of the Renun River and eleven other rivers located in the Lae Pondom Protected Forest Area.

The 25-meter Lae Renun Bridge was built on the Renun River and became an important artery connecting Medan City to Sidikalang, Pakpak Bharat, and Nangroe Aceh Darussalam (NAD). The bridge that connects Sumbul and Sitinjo sub-districts in Dairi regency is very vulnerable during the rainy season, because the bridge is flooded with water up to 10 cm to 15 cm on the shoulder, so that passing vehicles do not have the choice but to pass the puddle on the bridge.

== Events ==
Floods are often caused by the Lae Renun River, for example in Renun Village, Tanah Pinem District, Dairi Regency, around 14.00 WIB, which immersing 25 housing units and mosques, in addition to breaking a suspension bridge connecting Renun Village and Lau Njuhar Village as well as damaging 30 hectares of corn field belonging to the residents.

== See also ==
- List of drainage basins of Indonesia
- List of rivers of Indonesia
- List of rivers of Sumatra
