= Kampar Kanan River =

Coordinates: 0.2698°N 101.6797°E

Kampar Kanan River Batang Kampar Kanan, Sungai Kampar Kanan
- Location of river mouth Kampar Kanan River (Indonesia)

Location
- Country: Indonesia

Physical characteristics
- Source
  - location: West Sumatra
- Mouth: Kampar River
  - location: Pelalawan Regency, Riau

The Kampar Kanan River is a river in Riau province, Sumatra island, Indonesia. It is a tributary of the Kampar River.

== Hydrology ==
The river springs out of Mount Gadang. It flows first to the north, and then turning to east meets its tributaries Batang Kapur Nan Gadang and Batang Mahat. It runs across the Lima Puluh Kota and Kampar regencies, then meets the Kampar Kiri River, which is almost equal in size, in the area of Langgam (Pelalawan Regency). After the confluence, it is called the Kampar River until discharging into the Malacca Strait.

== Geography ==
The river flows in the central area of Sumatra with predominantly tropical rainforest climate (designated as Af in the Köppen-Geiger climate classification). The annual average temperature in the area is 24 °C. The warmest month is October, when the average temperature is around 26 °C, and the coldest is November, at 22 °C. The average annual rainfall is 2667 mm. The wettest month is November, with an average of 402 mm rainfall, and the driest is June, with 104 mm rainfall.

== Ecology ==
Researchers found in the Kampar Kanan River the abundance of bivalves, such as Anadonta woodiana (11/m^{2}), Corbicula moltkiana (33/m^{2}), Hyriopsis sp (4/m^{2}), Pilsbryconcha exilis (10/m^{2}) and Rectidens sp (3/m2), as well as gastropods, such as Melanoides granifera (20/m^{2}), Melanoides tubercullata (120/m^{2}), Bellamya sp (45/m^{2}), Brothia sp (28/m^{2}), Pila ampullacea (25/m^{2}) and Thiara scabra (4/m^{2}).

== See also ==
- List of drainage basins of Indonesia
- List of rivers of Indonesia
- List of rivers of Sumatra
