= Wampu River =

Coordinates: 3.8178°N 98.4736°E

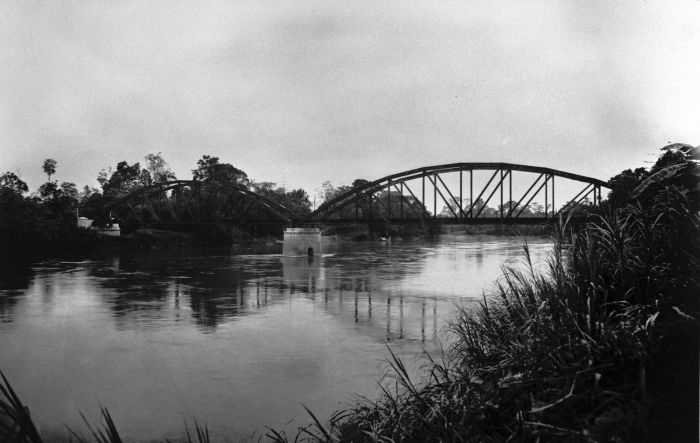
- Railway bridge over the River Wampu around 1920

- Location of river mouth Wampu River (Indonesia)

Location
- Country: Indonesia
- State: North Sumatra
- Region: Karo Regency, Langkat Regency

Physical characteristics
- Source: Lau Biang
  - location: Siberaya
- Mouth: Strait of Malacca

The Wampu River is a river in North Sumatra, Indonesia, about 1500 km northwest of the capital Jakarta.

== Hydrology ==
It rises as the Lau Biang River in Karo Regency near Siberaya, flowing past Kabanjahe, Perbesi, Kuta Buluh, Marike, and onto Bohorok in Langkat Regency, where the river is known as the Wampu. It flows past Stabat and Tanjung Langkat before emptying into the Strait of Malacca. The Bohorok River is a tributary of the Wampu.

Much of the river valley was once fertile rainforest, but most has now been destroyed for logging and oil palm plantations.

== Geography ==
The river flows in the northern area of Sumatra with a predominantly tropical rainforest climate (designated as Af in the Köppen-Geiger climate classification). The annual average temperature in the area is 25 °C. The warmest month is August, when the average temperature is around 26 °C, and the coldest is December, at 24 °C. The average annual rainfall is 2862 mm. The wettest month is October, with an average of 446 mm of rainfall, and the driest is June, with 129 mm of rainfall.

== See also ==
- List of drainage basins of Indonesia
- List of rivers of Indonesia
- List of rivers of Sumatra
