= Banyuasin River =

Coordinates: 2.2849°S 104.8289°E

Banyuasin River Sungai Banyuasin, Air Banyuasin, Air Banjoeasin, Banyu Asin, Air Banjoesit, Air Banjuasin
- Location of river mouth Banyuasin River (Indonesia)

Location
- Country: Indonesia

Physical characteristics
- Source
  - location: South Sumatra

The Banyuasin River (Indonesian: Sungai Banyuasin, lit. 'Salty Water River') is a river in southern Sumatra, Indonesia, about 500 km northwest of the capital Jakarta.

== Geography ==
The river flows in South Sumatra province with predominantly tropical rainforest climate (designated as Af in the Köppen–Geiger climate classification). The annual average temperature in the area is 23 °C. The warmest month is July, when the average temperature is around 24 °C, and the coldest is March, at 22 °C. The average annual rainfall is 2579 mm. The wettest month is April, with an average of 344 mm rainfall, and the driest September, with 99 mm rainfall.

== See also ==
- List of drainage basins of Indonesia
- List of rivers of Indonesia
- List of rivers of Sumatra
