= Indragiri River =

Coordinates: 0°22′S 103°26′E

Indragiri River Kuantan River, Batang Indragiri, Sungai Indragiri, Soengai Inderagiri, Batang Inderagiri, Batang Kuantan, Batang Koeantan, Sungai Kuatan, Koentan, Sungai Batangkuantan
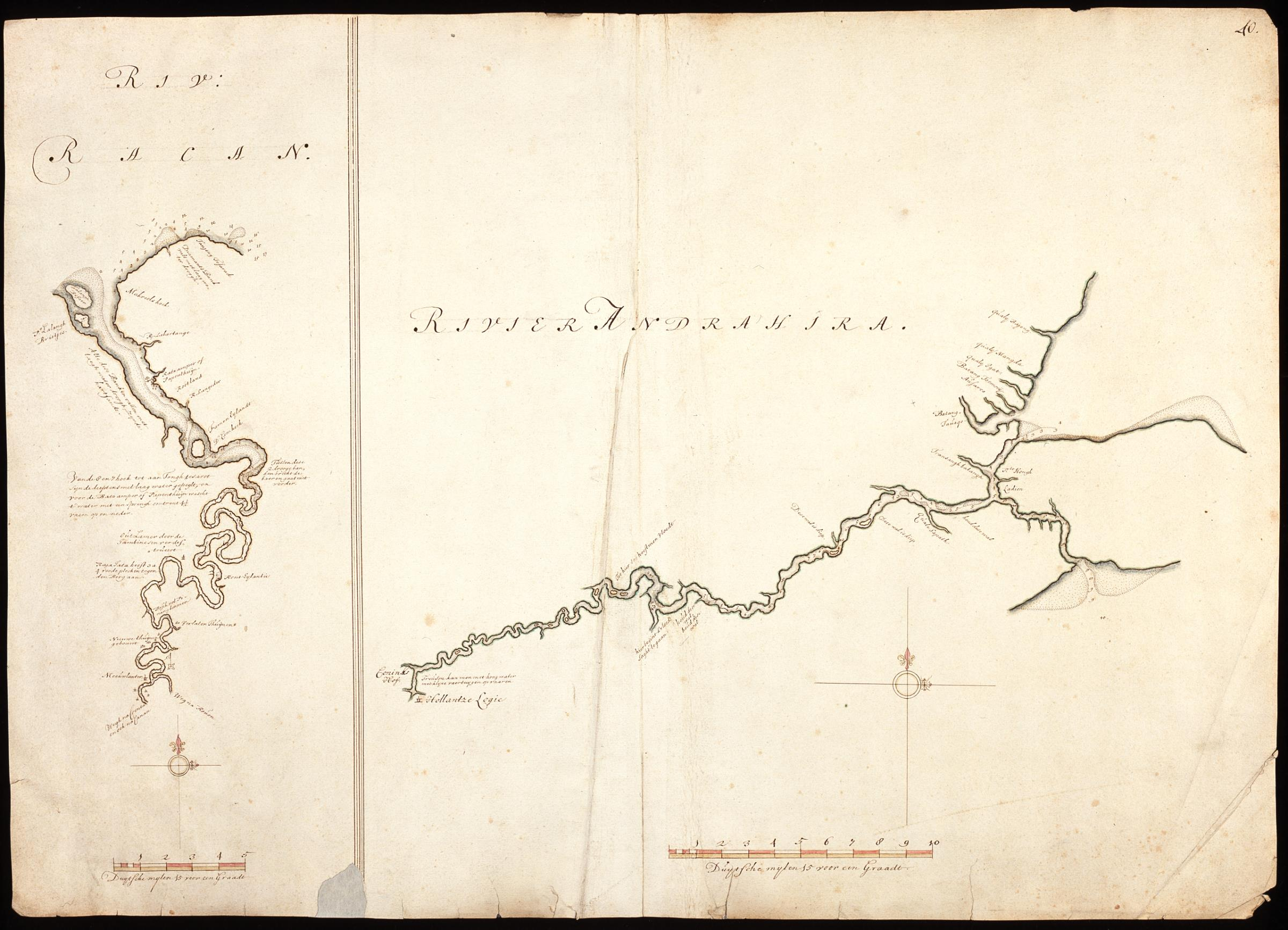
- Map of the Rokan and Indragiri (right) rivers by Isaak de Graaf, circa 1690–1743.

- Location of river mouth Indragiri River (Indonesia)

Location
- Country: Indonesia

Physical characteristics
- Source: Ombilin River, Sinamar River
  - location: West Sumatra
- Mouth: Strait of Malacca
  - location: Riau
- Length: 500 km (310 mi)
- Basin size: 17,968 km^{2} (6,937 mi^{2})
- Discharge
  - location: Indragiri Delta, Malacca Strait
  - average: (Period of data: 2009–2013)1,339 m^{3}/s (47,300 cu ft/s)

The Indragiri River is a river in Sumatra, in the Indonesian province of Riau, about 800 km northwest of the capital Jakarta. Formed by the union of the Ombilin River and the Sinamar River, the Indragiri empties into the Strait of Malacca. The middle part that flows in the Kuantan Singingi and Indragiri Hulu is called Batang Kuantan (Kuantan River).

== Geography ==
The river flows in the eastern area of Sumatra with predominantly tropical rainforest climate (designated as Af in the Köppen-Geiger climate classification). The annual average temperature in the area is 23 °C. The warmest month is February, when the average temperature is around 24 °C, and the coldest is August, at 22 °C. The average annual rainfall is 2757 mm. The wettest month is November, with an average of 345 mm rainfall, and the driest is January, with 107 mm rainfall.

== See also ==
- List of drainage basins of Indonesia
- List of rivers of Indonesia
- List of rivers of Sumatra
