= Asahan River =

River in North Sumatra, Indonesia

Asahan River: Aek Toba; Aek Asahan; Sei Asahan; Sungai Asahan
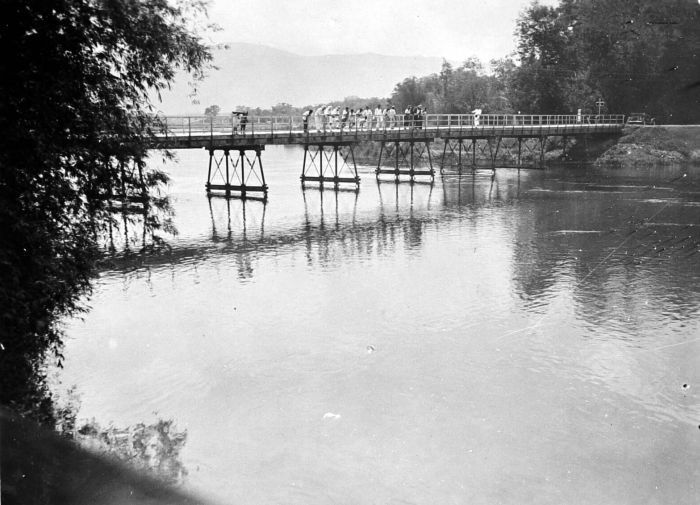
- Spring of the Asahan River at Porsea, Toba Samosir (1929)

- Location within Sumatra Location within Indonesia

Location
- Country: Indonesia

Physical characteristics
- Source
  - location: Lake Toba, Porsea, Toba Samosir, North Sumatra
  - coordinates: 2.434866, 99.147690
  - elevation: 950 m (3,120 ft)
- Mouth
  - location: Strait of Malacca
  - coordinates: 3.03333°N 99.866667°E
  - elevation: 0 m
- Length: 147 km (91 mi)
- Basin size: 7,225.45 km^{2} (2,789.76 mi^{2})
- Discharge
  - location: Near mouth
  - average: (Period: 1971–2000)265.7 m^{3}/s (9,380 cu ft/s)

The Asahan River (Indonesian: Sungai Asahan) is one of the principal rivers in North Sumatra, Indonesia, that begins in Porsea, Toba Regency near the southeast corner of Lake Toba.

== Hydrology ==
The river flows in a north-easterly direction, cutting through the upper course of the deep valley in the Barisan Mountains in Toba Regency, then flows through the Asahan Regency and eventually empties into the Strait of Malacca

The largest city on the Asahan is Tanjungbalai, Asahan with a population of more than 180,000 people. The river houses the Sigura-gura Dam, which supplies power to the North Sumatran Province.

Tributaries of the Asahan include the Silang, Silau, Nantalu, Masihi, Lauran, and Baru River.

== Geography ==
The river flows along the northeast area of Sumatra with predominantly tropical rainforest climate (designated as Af in the Köppen-Geiger climate classification). The annual average temperature in the area is 23 °C. The warmest month is March, when the average temperature is around 25 °C, and the coldest is May, at 23 °C. The average annual rainfall is 2950 mm. The wettest month is November, with an average of 381 mm rainfall, and the driest is June, with 117 mm rainfall.

== See also ==
- List of drainage basins of Indonesia
- List of rivers of Sumatra
- List of rivers of Indonesia
