= Ombilin River =

Coordinates: 0.2964°S 103.2515°E

Ombilin River Batang Ombilin, Batang Umbilin, Batang Oembilin, Batang Kuantan
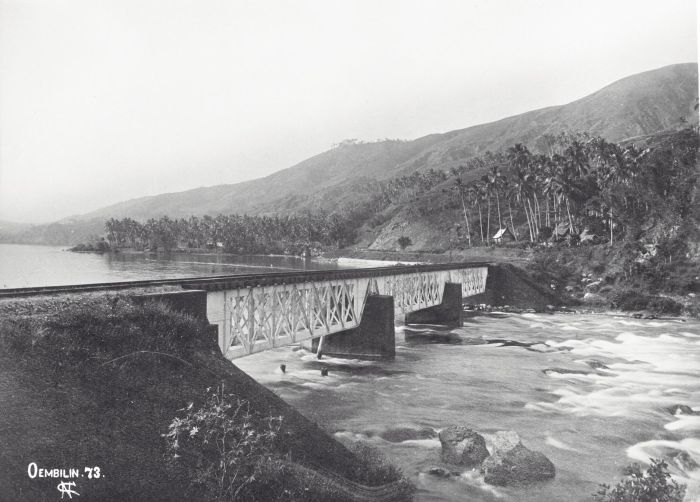

- Location of river mouth Ombilin River (Indonesia)

Location
- Country: Indonesia

Physical characteristics
- Source: Lake Singkarak, Bukit Barisan
  - location: Tanah Datar Regency & Solok Regency, West Sumatra
  - elevation: 400 m (1,300 ft)
- Mouth: Indragiri River (Batang Kuantan)

Basin features
- River system: Indragiri basin

The Ombilin River is a river in West Sumatra, Indonesia, about 900 km northwest of the capital Jakarta.

== Hydrology ==
The river flows from Lake Singkarak in West Sumatra eastward to the east coast of Sumatra. It is called Batang Kuantan (Kuantan River) in the Kuantan Singingi Regency and downstream until the river mouth at the Strait of Malacca is called Batang Indragiri (Indragiri River).

== Geography ==
The river flows in the central area of Sumatra with predominantly tropical rainforest climate (designated as Af in the Köppen–Geiger climate classification). The annual average temperature in the area is 22 °C. The warmest month is May, when the average temperature is around 24 °C, and the coldest is January, at 20 °C. The average annual rainfall is 3023 mm. The wettest month is November, with an average of 444 mm rainfall, and the driest is June, with 124 mm rainfall.

== See also ==
- List of drainage basins of Indonesia
- List of rivers of Indonesia
- List of rivers of Sumatra
