= Simpang-kanan River (North Sumatra) =

Coordinates: 2.3483°N 97.8591°E

Simpang-kanan River Sungai Simpangkanan, Sungai Simpang Kanan, Lae Tjinendang, Lae Cinendang, Aek Simpangkanan
- Location of river mouth Simpang-kanan River (North Sumatra) (Sumatra) Simpang-kanan River (North Sumatra) (Indonesia)

Location
- Country: Indonesia

Physical characteristics
- Source
  - location: North Sumatra
- Mouth
  - location: Aceh

Simpang-kanan River (Indonesian: Sungai Simpangkanan, means: Right Junction River) is a river in northern Sumatra, Indonesia, about 1400 km northwest of the capital Jakarta.

== Geography ==
The river flows in the northern area of Sumatra with predominantly tropical rainforest climate (designated as Af in the Köppen-Geiger climate classification). The annual average temperature in the area is 23 °C. The warmest month is February, when the average temperature is around 25 °C, and the coldest is April, at 22 °C. The average annual rainfall is 3355 mm. The wettest month is December, with an average of 463 mm rainfall, and the driest is June, with 125 mm rainfall.

== See also ==
- List of drainage basins of Indonesia
- List of rivers of Indonesia
- List of rivers of Sumatra
