= Batang Hari River =

Coordinates: 1°03′43″S 104°12′25″E

Batang Hari River Batang Hari, Sungai Batanghari, Djambi-rivier
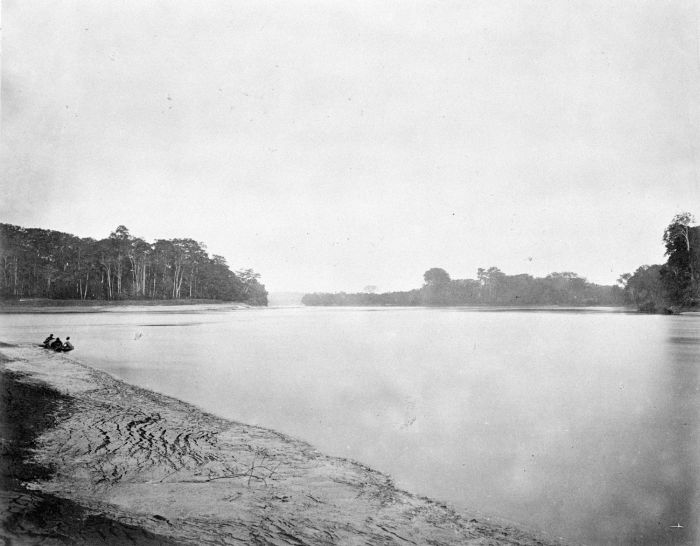
- The Batang Hari photographed during the 1877–79 Sumatra Expedition

- Location of river mouth Batang Hari River (Indonesia)

Location
- Country: Indonesia
- Province: West Sumatra, Jambi
- Regency: Solok Regency, South Solok Regency, Dharmasraya Regency, Bungo Regency, Tebo Regency, Batang Hari Regency, Muaro Jambi Regency, East Tanjung Jabung Regency, Jambi City

Physical characteristics
- Source: Mount Rasan
  - location: Solok Regency, West Sumatra
- Mouth: South China Sea
  - location: East Tanjung Jabung Regency, Jambi
- Length: 800 km (500 mi)
- Basin size: 44,890 km^{2} (17,330 mi^{2}) 46,504 km^{2} (17,955 mi^{2})
- Discharge
  - location: Batang Hari Delta, Berhala Strait
  - average: (Period of data: 1992–2016)2,556 m^{3}/s (90,300 cu ft/s) (Period of data: 2016–2020)2,819 m^{3}/s (99,600 cu ft/s) 2,643 m^{3}/s (93,300 cu ft/s)

The Batang Hari (Indonesian: Sungai Batanghari) is the longest river in Sumatra island, Indonesia, about 600 kilometres (370 mi) northwest of the capital Jakarta.

== Hydrology ==
The river originates in West Sumatra Province, in the Minangkabau Highlands, home of the Minangkabau people, and flows through Jambi Province to the east coast of Sumatra, reaching the sea in Nipah Panjang District of East Tanjung Jabung Regency. The Trans-Sumatran Highway (AH25) crosses the river at the city of Jambi which is located at some distance from the mouth of the river. The Batang Hari is used by the local population for fishing, transportation, mining, and personal hygiene.

== Geography ==
The river flows in the central area of Sumatra with a predominantly tropical rainforest climate (designated as Af in the Köppen–Geiger climate classification). The annual average temperature in the area is 23 °C (73 °F). The warmest month is April, when the average temperature is around 24 °C (75 °F), and the coldest is January, at 22 °C (72 °F). The average annual rainfall is 2383–3183 mm. The wettest month is December, with an average of 344 mm (13.5 in) rainfall, and the driest is August, with 90 mm rainfall.

== See also ==
- List of drainage basins in Indonesia
- List of rivers of Indonesia
- List of rivers of Sumatra
