= List of regencies and cities in North Sumatra =

This is a list of regencies and cities in North Sumatra province. As of October 2019, there were 25 regencies and 8 cities.

| # | Regency/ City | Capital | Regent/ Mayor | Area (km^{2}) | Population (2019) | District | Kelurahan (urban village)/ Desa (village) | Logo | Location map |
|---|---|---|---|---|---|---|---|---|---|
| 1 | Asahan Regency | Kisaran | Surya | 3,702.21 | 782,250 | 25 | 27/177 | | |
| 2 | Batubara Regency | Limapuluh | Zahir | 922.20 | 365,515 | 7 | 10/141 | | |
| 3 | Dairi Regency | Sidikalang | Eddy Keleng Ate Berutu | 1,927.80 | 315,330 | 15 | 8/161 | | |
| 4 | Deli Serdang Regency | Lubuk Pakam | Ashari Tambunan | 2,241.68 | 1,815,357 | 22 | 14/380 | | |
| 5 | Humbang Hasundutan Regency | Dolok Sanggul | Dosmar Banjarnahor | 2,335.33 | 199,424 | 10 | 1/153 | | |
| 6 | Karo Regency | Kabanjahe | Terkelin Brahmana | 2,127.00 | 405,162 | 17 | 10/259 | | |
| 7 | Labuhanbatu Regency | Rantau Prapat | Andi Suhaimi Dalimunthe | 2,156.02 | 501,388 | 9 | 23/75 | | |
| 8 | Labuhanbatu Selatan Regency | Kota Pinang | Wildan Aswan Tanjung | 3,596 | 321,374 | 5 | 2/52 | | |
| 9 | Labuhanbatu Utara Regency | Aek Kanopan | Khairuddin Syah Sitorus | 3,570.98 | 391,729 | 8 | 8/82 | | |
| 10 | Langkat Regency | Stabat | Terbit Rencana Perangin Angin | 6,262.00 | 1,043,249 | 23 | 37/240 | | |
| 11 | Mandailing Natal Regency | Panyabungan | Dahlan Hasan Nasution | 6,134.00 | 484,787 | 23 | 27/380 | | |
| 12 | Nias Regency | Gido | Sokhiatulo Laoli | 1,842.51 | 153,417 | 10 | -/170 | | |
| 13 | Nias Barat Regency | Lahomi | Faduhusi Daely | 473.73 | 95,330 | 8 | -/105 | | |
| 14 | Nias Selatan Regency | Teluk Dalam | Hilarius Duha | 1,825.20 | 364,606 | 35 | 3/457 | | |
| 15 | Nias Utara Regency | Lotu | Marselinus Ingati Nazara | 1,202.78 | 150,387 | 11 | 1/112 | | |
| 16 | Padang Lawas Regency | Sibuhuan | Ali Sutan Harahap | 3,892.74 | 260,406 | 12 | 1/303 | | |
| 17 | Padang Lawas Utara Regency | Gunung Tua | Andar Amin Harahap | 3,918.05 | 266,864 | 9 | 2/386 | | |
| 18 | Pakpak Bharat Regency | Salak | Asren Nasution | 1,218.30 | 53,832 | 8 | -/52 | | |
| 19 | Samosir Regency | Pangururan | Rapidin Simbolon | 2,069.05 | 142,812 | 9 | 6/128 | | |
| 20 | Serdang Bedagai Regency | Sei Rempah | Soekirman | 1,900.22 | 656,419 | 17 | 6/237 | | |
| 21 | Simalungun Regency | Raya | Jopinus Ramli Saragih | 4,386.60 | 1,030,832 | 31 | 27/386 | | |
| 22 | Tapanuli Selatan Regency | Sipirok | Syahrul M Pasaribu | 6,030.47 | 310,274 | 14 | 36/212 | | |
| 23 | Tapanuli Tengah Regency | Pandan | Bakhtiar Ahmad Sibarani | 2,188.00 | 362,001 | 20 | 56/159 | | |
| 24 | Tapanuli Utara Regency | Tarutung | Nikson Nababan | 3,791.64 | 315,947 | 15 | 11/241 | | |
| 25 | Toba Regency | Balige | Darwin Siagian | 2,328.89 | 211,042 | 16 | 13/231 | | |
| 26 | Binjai | - | Muhammad Idaham | 59.19 | 282,597 | 5 | 37/- | | |
| 27 | Gunungsitoli | - | Lakhomizaro Zebua | 280.78 | 139,545 | 6 | 3/98 | | |
| 28 | Medan | - | Akhyar Nasution | 265.10 | 2,502,092 | 21 | 151/- | | |
| 29 | Padangsidempuan | - | Irsan Efendi Nasution | 114.66 | 225,535 | 6 | 37/42 | | |
| 30 | Pematangsiantar | - | Hefriansyah Noor | 55.66 | 284,628 | 8 | 53/- | | |
| 31 | Sibolga | - | Syarfi Hutahuruk | 41.31 | 94,376 | 4 | 17/- | | |
| 32 | Tanjungbalai | - | M Syahrial | 107.83 | 174,829 | 6 | 31/- | | |
| 33 | Tebing Tinggi | - | Umar Zunaidi Hasibuan | 31.00 | 171,553 | 5 | 35/- | | |
