= Padang Lawas =

Padang Lawas may refer to:

- Padang Lawas Regency, North Sumatra, Indonesia
- Padang Lawas archaeological site, Indonesia
