= National Strategic Projects =

Indonesian infrastructure projects

National Strategic Project
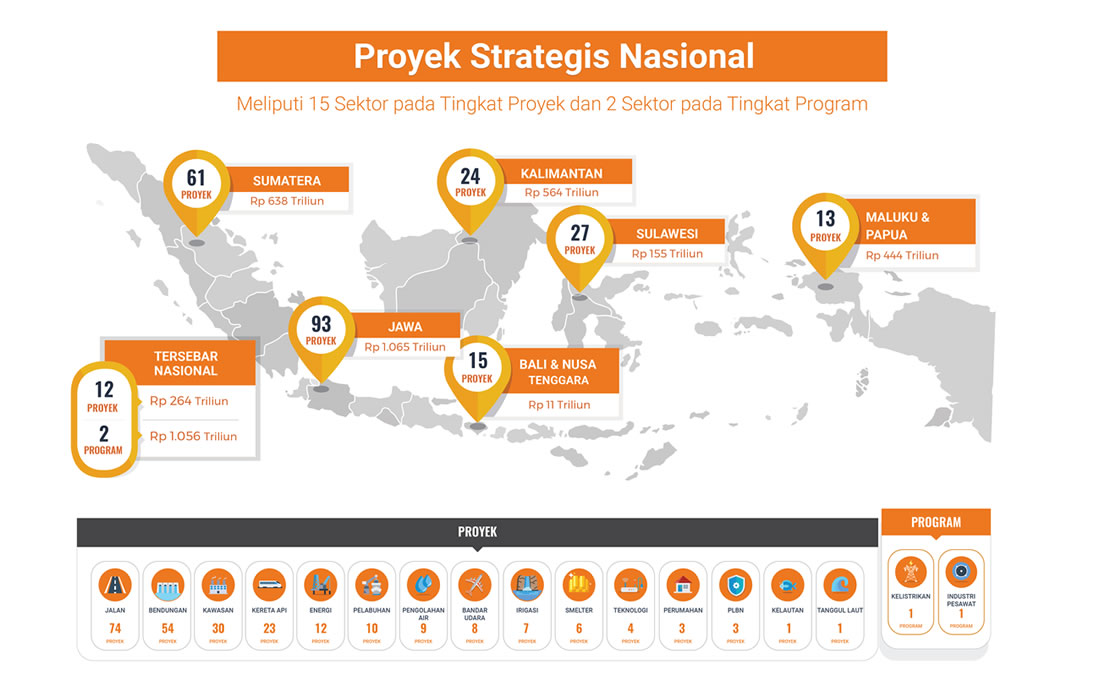
- Map of PSN-designated projects
- Location: Sumatra: 61 projects, Rp 638 trillion; Kalimantan: 24 projects, Rp 564 trillion; Java: 93 projects, Rp 1,065 trillion; Sulawesi: 27 projects, Rp 155 trillion; Maluku and Papua: 13 projects, Rp 444 trillion; Bali, dan Lesser Sunda Islands: 15 projects, Rp 11 trillion
- Country: Indonesia
- Ministry: Ministry of National Development Planning; Ministry of Public Works and Housing; Coordinating Ministry for Economic Affairs; Ministry of Transportation; Ministry of Agrarian Affairs and Spatial Planning; Ministry of Marine Affairs and Fisheries; Ministry of Energy and Mineral Resources
- Key people: President Joko Widodo
- Launched: 8 January 2016; 10 years ago
- Status: 2016: 20 finished projects worth Rp 33,3 trillion; 2017: 10 finished projects worth Rp 61,3 trillion; 2018: 32 finished projects worth Rp 207,4 trillion; 2019: 30 finished projects worth Rp 165,3 trillion
- Website: https://kppip.go.id

National Strategic Projects (Indonesian: Proyek Strategis Nasional, abbreviated PSN) are Indonesian infrastructure projects which are designated as strategic in increasing economic growth, equitable development, community welfare and regional development. It was established during the administration of President Joko Widodo. PSN is regulated through a presidential regulation, while project implementation is carried out directly by the central government, regional government, and/or business entities as well as Government-Enterprise Cooperation, prioritizing the use of domestic components.

PSNs are required to fulfill elements of basic, strategic, and operational criteria. The basic criteria is such that the project conforms with the National/Regional Medium Term Development Plan along with the strategic plan for the infrastructure sector, as well as conforming with the Spatial and Regional Plan as long as it does not disrupt green open spaces. Strategic criteria refers to the benefits of the project for the economy, social welfare, defense, national security, as well as connectivity and distribution diversity between islands. Since its launch in 2016, 92 National Strategic Projects have been completed with an investment value of Rp 467.4 trillion. The number of completed projects is equivalent to 41% of the total 223 projects contained in Presidential Regulation No. 56 of 2018. In terms of investment value, the contribution reached 11.4% of the total project investment of Rp 4,092 trillion. On the other hand, the National Strategic Project has also received various criticisms, such as negative cash flows experienced by state-owned enterprises (BUMN) due to assignments by the government and environmental issues. Apart from that, PSN also faces obstacles in terms of land acquisition, planning and preparation, funding, licensing and construction implementation.

== Background ==
Due to the 1998 economic crisis, Indonesia has seen the absence of large-scale infrastructure development, as can be seen from the infrastructure budget which fell from 9% of GDP in the mid-1990s to 2% in 2001. In 1998, Indonesia's infrastructure availability reached 49% of Gross Domestic Product, then shrank to 32% in 2012, then in 2015 to 35% and managed to increase again to 43% in early 2019. Minister of National Development Planning of Indonesia/Head of the Development Planning Agency Nationally(Bappenas) for the 2016-2019 period, Bambang Brodjonegoro assessed that Indonesia needs to catch up with the average standard of infrastructure availability in developed countries which reaches 70%, such as China and India whose infrastructure stock has reached 76% and 57%, including catching up with South Africa which has domestic products. Its gross is below Indonesia, but its infrastructure availability has reached 87%.

According to Bappenas, to improve Indonesia's lagging infrastructure capacity, the country needs large amounts of investment in this sector, namely Rp4,796.2 trillion during the 2015-2019 period. 41.3% or Rp1,978.6 trillion was contributed by the State Revenue and Expenditure Budget (APBN) and Regional Revenue and Expenditure Budget (APBD), then 22.2% or Rp1,066.2 trillion came from State-Owned Enterprises (BUMN), and the remaining 36.5% or Rp1,751.5 trillion came from the private sector. The need for investment funds is projected to increase again to Rp 6,445 trillion for the 2019-2024 period, with the largest contribution expected to come from the private sector, namely 42%, followed by the APBN at 37%, and BUMN by 21%.

The National Strategic Project aims to quickly improve the quality and availability (stock) of Indonesia's infrastructure, so as to increase the efficiency and productivity of the national economy. In the 2015-2019 National Medium Term Development Plan, one of the main problems and challenges facing the Indonesian economy is the limited availability of infrastructure to support increased economic progress. Limited infrastructure stock also creates obstacles in increasing investment, expensive logistics costs, and creates disparities between regions. The World Bank estimates that poor quality infrastructure has contributed to reduced economic growth by 1% since 2014. The National Strategic Project is also directed and adapted to the National Medium Term Development Plan 2015-2019 which emphasizes the objectives of improving infrastructure to increase national connectivity, providing basic infrastructure such as drinking water and sanitation, electricity infrastructure, ensuring water, food and energy security and developing urban mass transportation system.

== Legal basis ==
=== Initiation ===
PSNs were first established by the president Joko Widodo on 8 January 2016 through Presidential Regulation of the Republic of Indonesia No. 3 of 2016 concerning the Acceleration of Implementation of National Strategic Projects. The complexity of licensing and non-licensing issues in the development of infrastructure projects is attempted to be resolved through this presidential decree, through the One-Stop Integrated Service (PTSP) that was coordinated by Investment Coordinating Board (BKPM) where the licensing in the central will be handled at the Central One-Stop Integrated Service, while in the regions it is handled by provincial, district or city PTSP.

To support its establishment, the regulation is backed by Presidential Instruction Number 1 of 2016, which instructs government bodies and ministries to support the acceleration of the implementation of the PSN. Though the regulation was published on 2016, the criteria for eligibility of the project is already decided in coordinated meeting on 10 September 2015. The criteria is consisted of three criteria such as basic criteria, operational criteria and strategical criteria. The basic criteria further include compliance with the National and Regional Mid-Term Development Plans, strategic plans for the infrastructure sector, and compliance with the Spatial Planning and Zoning Plan (Rencana Tata Ruang dan Wilayah) as long as it does not alter the Green Open Space. On the other hand, strategic criteria consist of having a strategic role in the economy, social welfare, and national defense and security (measured by contributions to GDP/GRDP, labor absorption, socio-economic impacts, and environmental effects); demonstrating strong linkages across infrastructure sectors and between regions, creating complementary effects; and promoting balanced development across islands, specifically addressing the balance between the western and eastern regions of Indonesia. At the last, operational criteria consist of that the new proposed projects must have a Pre-Feasibility Study and the project investment needs to have value exceeds IDR 100 billion or plays a strategic role in boosting regional economic growth.

=== Implementation ===
A principle permit from the BKPM is required to be issued within one day after being submitted. Then BKPM through PTSP is also obliged to process and complete licensing and non-licensing processes no later than 5 days, such as location permits, building construction permits, except for environmental permits (60 days), forest area borrow-to-use permits (30 days), and fiscal facilities and non-fiscal (28 days). Business Entities are also not required to obtain location permits if they have obtained land rights and permits to borrow forest areas. The designation of National Strategic Projects can be altered based on studies conducted by the Committee for the Acceleration of Priority Infrastructure Provision (KPPIP).

A new project proposal, intended to be a part of the National Strategic Projects (PSN), is submitted to the Committee for the Acceleration of Priority Infrastructure Provision. The committee will filter the proposals based on several criteria, including project requirements, benefits, the connection between the proposed project and existing completed infrastructure, and the project's deadline. The results of this filtering process are then discussed in a limited meeting with the Coordinating Minister for Economic Affairs. Finally, the project is implemented after the issuance of a Presidential Regulation.

=== Legal issues ===
However, this regulation received criticisms, since if there are deviations or abuse of authority in the implementation of National Strategic Projects, resolution is carried out by prioritizing government administration processes. If an examination by the Government Internal Supervisory Apparatus (APIP) found that there is an administrative error that is not a state loss, the resolution is carried out by improving the administration within a maximum of 10 days, then if there is an administrative error that causes a loss to the state, the resolution is in the form of improving the administration and refunding the state loss within a maximum of 10 working days. and if there is a criminal act that is not administrative in nature, the head of the ministry/institution, governor, or regent/mayor submits it to the Attorney General's Office or the Indonesian National Police no later than five working days for legal regulations to be followed up.

== Regulation ==
- Government Decree No. 42 of 2021 concerning Facilitation of National Strategic Projects
- Presidential Decree No. 82 of 2015 concerning Central Government Guarantees for Infrastructure Financing through Direct Loans from International Financial Institutions to State-Owned Enterprises
- Presidential Decree No. 38 of 2015 concerning Government Cooperation with Business Entities in Providing Infrastructure
- Presidential Decree No. 30 of 2015 concerning Land Acquisition for Development in the Public Interest
- Presidential Decree No. 117 of 2015 concerning Amendments to Presidential Regulation No. 100 of 2014 concerning the Acceleration of Toll Road Development in Sumatra
- Presidential Decree No. 146 of 2015 concerning the Implementation of Domestic Oil Refinery Construction and Expansion.
- Presidential Decree No 82 of 2015 concerning Central Government Guarantees for Infrastructure Financing through Direct Loans from International Financial Institutions to BUMN
- Presidential Decree No. 56 of 2017 concerning Handling Social Impacts in the Context of Providing Land for National Strategic Projects
- Presidential Decree No. 66 of 2020 concerning Funding for Land Acquisition for Development in the Public Interest in the Context of Implementing National Strategic Projects
- Minister of Finance Decree No 232/PMK.06/2015 concerning Implementation of the Transfer of Government Investment in the Government Investment Center to State Capital Participation in PT Sarana Multi Infrastruktur
- Minister of Finance Decree No 189/PMK.08/2015 concerning Procedures for Providing and Implementing Government Guarantees for Infrastructure Financing through Direct Loans from International Financial Institutions
- Minister of Finance Decree No 190/PMK.08/2015 concerning Payments for Service Availability in the Context of Government Cooperation with Business Entities in Providing Infrastructure

== Projects ==
The number of PSNs recorded every year continues to change, either because the previous year's projects have been completed, projects have been removed from the list, or new projects have been added. Since it was first included in Presidential Regulation of the Republic of Indonesia No. 3 of 2016 concerning the Acceleration of Implementation of National Strategic Projects, the number of National Strategic Projects has reached 225 projects and 1 program.[6]

Then in Presidential Regulation of the Republic of Indonesia No. 58 of 2017, the number of projects increased to 245 PSNs and 3 Programs. In this Presidential Decree, there are 55 new projects and one aircraft industry program. Meanwhile, in 2018 there were 223 PSNs and 3 National Programs, as stated in the Presidential Regulation of the Republic of Indonesia No. 56 of 2018, which was signed on 20 July 2018.[19]

In nominal terms, a total of 245 PSNs and 2 programs with total investment reached US$ 327.2 billion or Rp. 4,417 trillion. Meanwhile, the total value of National Strategic Projects for 2018 reached IDR 4,183 trillion. All National Strategic Projects are divided into 15 sectors and 2 programs.[35]

== Criticism ==
Massive infrastructure development and the incessant acceleration of development of National Strategic Projects have resulted in the 2017 Revised State Revenue and Expenditure Budget (APBN) experiencing a deficit of 2.9% of Gross Domestic Product. On the one hand, there are 32 National Strategic Projects worth Rp. 207,4 trillion which were completed in 2018, but on the other hand there is a crowding out effect, namely a situation where there is a struggle for funds in the market due to the high need for liquidity attracted by the government through the issuance of government debt securities. with banking and over-investment, namely a situation where fiscal expansion has no impact on increasing productivity and economic output.

Unika Atmajaya Chancellor Agustinus Prasetyantoko assessed that the crowding out effect could occur due to massive infrastructure development, although it has not yet led to over-investment. One of the risks of infrastructure development is increasing the burden on the economy in the short term, but in the long term it can have a double effect as long as the short term risks can be managed well.

Apart from that, several groups and economists are concerned about the increasing foreign debt of state-owned enterprises. The cash flow of state-owned enterprises (BUMN) assigned to build infrastructure is said by Agus Pambagio, a public policy observer, to be yellow and some to be red. According to A Prasetyantoko, the risk management aspect of several National Strategic Projects is also a little loose, with a lack of robust feasibility studies as seen in the Jakarta-Bandung high-speed train project, and the construction of the Light Rail Transit (LRT) which still creates funding scheme problems even though the project is already underway.

Vice President Jusuf Kalla has been recorded criticizing several National Strategic Projects, such as the Jabodebek LRT, Trans Sulawesi Railway and Kertajati Airport, West Java. Jusuf Kalla assessed that the construction of the Jabodebek elevated LRT (the building structure above) caused expensive costs and meant that the toll road could not be widened any further. Until 2020, the Palembang LRT which has been operating is still quiet and is only a place for local tourists to try things out. Jusuf Kalla assessed that the project had caused losses to the regional government, due to the lack of economic and technical studies of the project. The construction of the Trans Sulawesi train from Manado to Makassar is expected to be empty of transporting goods and passengers. Kertajati Airport, which was built at a cost of Rp. 2,6 trillion at the initiative of the Governor of West Java, is still quiet now, because it is located far from Jakarta and far from Bandung (100 kilometers from the city of Bandung).

The construction work on several National Strategic Projects has also received attention regarding project risk management and caution following several incidents of project construction collapses, such as the Depok–Antasari Toll Road which experienced two construction collapses in 2018 and October 2019. Two cranes weighing 70 tons and 80 tons for the LRT project in Palembang, South Sumatra, August 2017, fell onto residents' houses, the collapse of the toll bridge crossing for people on the Bogor–Ciawi–Sukabumi Toll Road project in September 2017, formwork head of the Road project The Bekasi–Cawang–Kampung Melayu Toll Road collapsed, the construction of the Pasuruan–Probolinggo Toll Road collapsed, and others so on.

Chairman of the Construction and Infrastructure Division of the Indonesian Chamber of Commerce and Industry, Erwin Aksa, assessed that the large number of construction accidents was caused by assignments to build new infrastructure projects to too many State-Owned Enterprises (BUMN) without taking into account their capabilities, thus causing the level of accuracy and prudential management to become fragmented. Due to the various construction accidents above, the Minister of Public Works and Public Housing, Basuki Hadimuljono, formed a Construction Safety Committee in January 2018. From the results of evaluations and audits from February 20-28, 2018, the Construction Safety Committee concluded that 38 out of 40 construction projects received recommendations that construction could continue, with details of 10 projects being able to continue with notes and 28 other construction projects continuing without notes.

In July 2019, the Construction Safety Committee also issued a recommendation to PT PP to replace the general manager of the Bogor Outer Ring Road construction project and the leader of the construction management consultant team of PT Indec, the project's operational cooperation partner, following the collapse of a support pole.

Regarding environmental aspects, the implementation of the National Strategic Project is considered to have not implemented the principles of sustainable development by implementing green construction which has just been implemented in building construction. Assessment of emissions and environmental impacts is necessary because the National Strategic Project construction development process is dominated by five jobs, namely concrete work (75%), earthwork (66.67%), steel work (51.17%), masonry work (41.67%) and wood work (29.17%).

The Indonesian Forum for the Environment (Walhi) criticized the National Strategic Project for cutting environmental permits or Environmental Impact Analysis to under 60 days. Meanwhile, West Kalimantan branch of Walhi believes that there is a need for a Strategic Environmental Study (KLHS) to become the main prerequisite for the construction of the Kijing International Port project, in West Kalimantan, which requires an investment of Rp. 14 trillion. Local fishermen feel that their fishing sea area is becoming narrow and decreasing.

In Bekasi, the Vice Governor of West Java, Uu Ruzhanul Ulum, assessed that the floods that hit Bekasi City in February 2020 occurred due to rising river levels, the construction of the Bekasi–Cawang–Kampung Melayu Toll Road project, the construction of the Light Rail Transit, and the Jakarta–Bandung highspeed rail line project. Meanwhile, Head of the Tangerang City Public Works and Housing Department, Decky Priambodo, assessed that the damage to the 2.2 kilometer Perancis Road in Tangerang City was caused by the large number of large-tonnage trucks passing by which were working on the Cengkareng–Batuceper Toll Road project.

== Obstacles ==
=== Funding ===
To address funding, the government has formed PT Sarana Multi Infrastruktur and increased its capital capacity by Rp. 20,4 trillion in December 2015, so that PT Sarana Multi Infrastruktur's capital is above Rp. 22 trillion, then PT Indonesia Infrastructure Finance which was founded on January 15, 2010, PT Penjaminan Infrastruktur Indonesia which was formed on May 11, 2010 and the scope of its guarantee was expanded to State-Owned Enterprises, including BUMN which received assignments from government, availability payment services, namely the PJPK's periodic payment facilities to business entities for the availability of infrastructure services, as well as the State Asset Management Institute whose task is to ensure timely availability of land for the development of National Strategic Projects. As of December 2019, the State Asset Management Institute had realized land acquisition payments of Rp. 45,09 trillion.

Long before that, the government had also provided Viability Gap Fund funding facilities or feasibility support funds through Minister of Finance Decree No 223/PMK.011/2012 concerning Providing Feasibility Support for Part of Construction Costs in Government Collaboration Projects with Business Entities in Providing Infrastructure. Feasibility Support Funds are provided in cash amounting to a maximum of 49% of the total value of the project being collaborated. The background is that the investment burden in the form of expensive construction has not been able to be fully recovered by infrastructure service rates due to people's purchasing power.

Various breakthroughs related to funding barriers to finance infrastructure projects have also been made. One of the latest breakthroughs regarding this funding is a new financing scheme called Limited Concession Scheme.

The aim of the Limited Concession Scheme is that the government can monetize infrastructure assets that are already operating and running commercially. In this scheme, the government remains the owner of the assets, but the optimization of existing infrastructure assets is carried out in collaboration with business entities. Asset optimization includes asset development, use of new technology, and operational improvements.

According to the Committee for the Acceleration and Provision of Priority Infrastructure, the Limited Concession Scheme will be regulated through a presidential regulation, the draft of which is currently in the process of harmonization. Apart from that, Presidential Regulation No. 27 of 2014 concerning Management of State/Regional Property needs to be revised.

In the capital market, since 2017, Financial Services Authority Regulation No 52/POJK.4/2017 concerning Collective Investment Contracts for Infrastructure Investment Funds or in layman's language is infrastructure mutual funds. These are issued by the investment manager and offered to public investors (both institutional and retail investors) with a minimum purchase of Rp. 100,000.

With several alternative sources of funding, several National Strategic Projects with the Government-Enterprise Cooperation scheme can run, such as the Balikpapan-Samarinda Toll Road, Manado-Bitung Toll Road, Panimbang-Serang Toll Road, and Yogyakarta-Bawen Toll Road. Apart from that, the Umbulan Drinking Water Supply System, The Palapa Ring National Strategic Project also uses an availability payment scheme.

=== Citizen's opposition ===
Apart from the technical aspects of project preparation, obstacles to the development of the National Strategic Project came from resistance and demonstrations from local residents, especially because residents objected to land compensation. Rejection and demonstrations from residents occurred for several National Strategic Projects, such as Rokan Kiri Dam (Rokan Hulu Regency, Riau), Way Apu Dam (Maluku), Balongo Ulu Dam (Gorontalo), and Padang–Pekanbaru Toll Road. Residents around the Rokan Kiri Dam location are worried that their village will sink and will not receive compensation, so they refuse to build the dam, which will require an investment of Rp. 2,6 trillion and can irrigate 4,000 hectares of rice fields. In Maluku, students demonstrated against the progress of the construction of the Way Apu Dam in Maluku, worth Rp. 1,66 trillion, because it was considered that the project work was haphazard.

The people of Nagari Kasang, Batang Anai District, Padang Pariaman Regency, demonstrated to demand adequate land compensation for the Padang–Pekanbaru Toll Road project. Residents assess that the compensation offered for 109 plots of land is still below the sales value of the tax object. Apart from that, residents asked for uninterrupted access between villages, so PT Hutama Karya as the contractor plans to build an underground crossing as a solution. The construction of the Balongo Ulu Dam was also demonstrated by local residents regarding the issue of land compensation. In Pleret, Pasuruan, residents are taking issue with the Umbulan Drinking Water Supply System project, related to environmental impact assessment issues and concerns about the commercialization of drinking water supply. A different thing happened to the residents of South Tapanuli who actually supported the construction of the Batang Toru hydroelectric power plant with a capacity of 510 MW. Residents even opposed non-governmental organizations that wanted to cancel one of the National Strategic Projects.

The issue of the acquisition of customary land has also become a factor inhibiting the development of National Strategic Projects. All local residents must be relocated, even though only part of the customary land is affected by project development. The tribal chief must be persuaded, there is a ceremony to release customary rights, and compensation changes must also be transparent, involving the local government.
