= North Labuhanbatu Regency =

Regency in North Sumatra, Indonesia

Coordinates: 2.3333°N 99.6375°E

North Labuhanbatu Regency Kabupaten Labuhanbatu Utara
- Regency

Other transcription(s)
  - Jawi: لابوهن باتو اوتارا
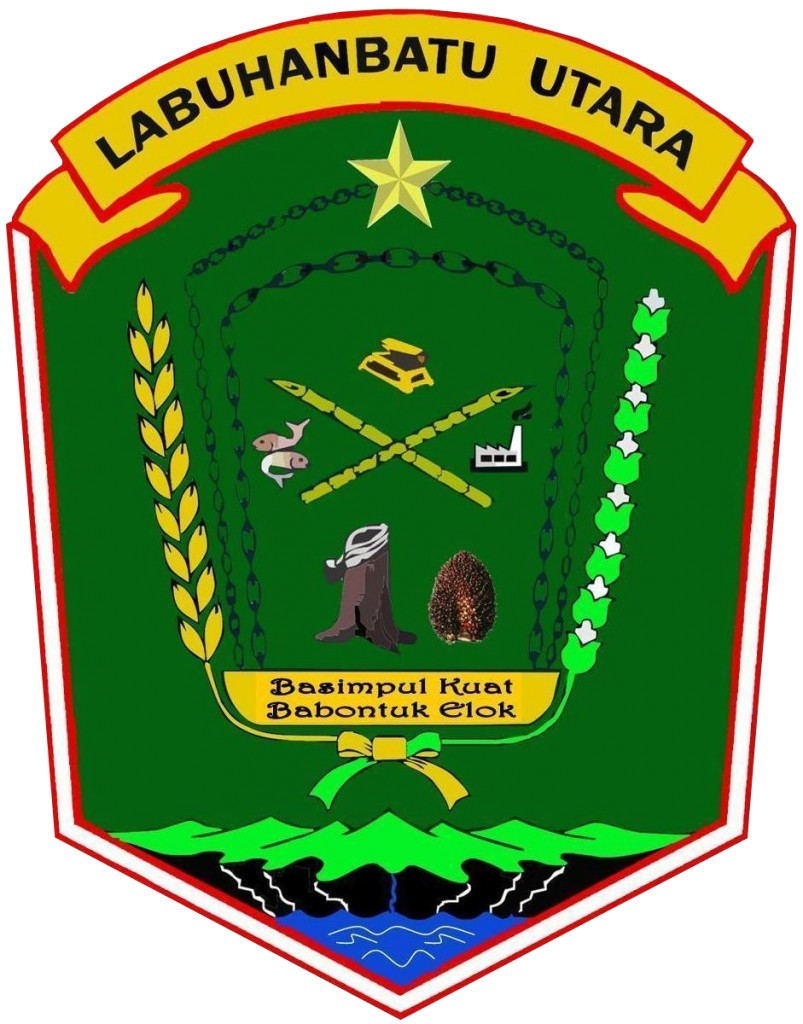
- Coat of arms
- Motto: Basimpul Kuat Babontuk Elok ("Strongly knotted, beautifully formed")
- Country: Indonesia
- Province: North Sumatra
- Regency seat: Aek Kanopan

Government
  - Regent: Hendri Yanto Sitorus
  - Vice Regent: Samsul Tanjung
  - Chairman of Council of Representatives: Ali Tambunan (Golkar)
  - Vice Chairmen of Council of Representatives: Amran Pasaribu (People's Conscience Party) and Yusrial Suprianto (National Awakening Party)

Area
  - Total: 3,545.8 km^{2} (1,369.0 sq mi)

Population (mid 2025 estimate)
  - Total: 402,860
  - Density: 113.62/km^{2} (294.26/sq mi)
- Time zone: UTC+7 (WIB)
- Website: www.labura.go.id

North Labuhanbatu Regency (Kabupaten Labuhanbatu Utara, alternatively Kabupaten Labuhan Batu Utara) is a regency of North Sumatra, Indonesia, created on 21 July 2008 (in accordance with Law No. 23 of 24 June 2008) by being carved out of the north-western districts of the existing Labuhanbatu Regency, which until 2008 covered an area of 9,703 square kilometres and had a population of 840,382 according to the 2000 census. 60.99% of the regency is forested. The new North Labuhanbatu Regency covers 3,545.8 square kilometres and had a population of 331,660 at the 2010 Census, rising to 381,994 at the 2020 Census; the official estimate as of mid 2025 was 402,860 (comprising 203,578 males and 199,282 females). The Kualuh River is located in this regency. The administrative centre of the regency is at the town of Aek Kanopan.

North Labuhanbatu Regency is bordered by Asahan Regency to the northwest, Toba Regency to the west, by three regencies to the south (Garoga District of North Tapanuli Regency, Aek Bilah District of South Tapanuli Regency, and Dolok Sigompulon District of North Padang Lawas Regency), and by Labuhanbatu Regency to the east. To the northeast it has a short coastline along the Strait of Malacca.

== Administrative districts ==
The regency is divided administratively into eight districts (kecamatan), tabulated below with their areas and their populations at the 2010 Census and 2020 Census, together with the official estimates as of mid 2025. The table also includes the locations of the district centres, the number of administrative villages in each district (totaling 82 rural desa and 8 urban kelurahan), and its post code.

Kode Wilayah	Name of District (kecamatan)	Area in km^{2}	Pop'n Census 2010	Pop'n Census 2020	Pop'n Estimate mid 2025	Admin centre	No. of villages	Post code
12.23.06	Na IX-X	554.00	49,690	57,633	61,400	Aek Kota Baru	13 ^{(a)}	21454
12.23.05	Marbau	355.90	38,195	42,315	44,835	Marbau	18 ^{(b)}	21452
12.23.04	Aek Kuo	250.20	28,900	35,691	33,412	Aek Korsik	8	21455
12.23.07	Aek Natas	678.00	33,341	38,171	40,580	Bandar Durian	12 ^{(c)}	21456
12.23.08	Kualuh Selatan (South Kualuh)	344.51	55,914	64,431	70,322	Damuli Pekan	12 ^{(d)}	21458
12.23.03	Kualuh Hilir (Lower Kualuh)	385.48	31,604	34,742	35,675	Kampung Mesjid	7 ^{(e)}	21474
12.23.01	Kualuh Hulu (Upper Kualuh)	637.39	64,600	74,334	80,048	Aek Kanopan	13 ^{(f)}	21457
12.23.02	Kualuh Leidong	340.32	28,457	34,677	36,478	Tanjung Leidong	7 ^{(g)}	21475
	Totals	3,545.80	330,701	381,994	402,860	Aek Kanopan	90	

Note: (a) including the kelurahan of Aek Kota Batu, with 7,093 inhabitants as at mid 2024.
(b) including the kelurahan of Marbau, with 2,726 inhabitants as at mid 2024.
(c) including the kelurahan of Bandar Durian, with 7,085 inhabitants as at mid 2024.
(d) including the kelurahan of Gunting Saga, with 8,548 inhabitants as at mid 2024.
(e) including the kelurahan of Kampung Mesjid, with 5,033 inhabitants as at mid 2024.
(f) including the two kelurahan of Aek Kanopan and Aek Kanopan Timur, with 18,514 and 9,010 inhabitants respectively as at mid 2024.
(g) including the kelurahan of Tanjung Leidong, with 9,640 inhabitants as at mid 2024.
