= Sibuhuan =

Coordinates: 1°04′N 99°42′E

Sibuhuan is a town (kelurahan), officially Pasar Sibuhuan (lit. Sibuhuan Market), within Barumun District (kecamatan) of Padang Lawas Regency, in North Sumatra Province of Indonesia. It is bordered by two rural villages (desa) of Sibuhuan Jae and Sibuhuan Julu. It contains the administrative capital of Padang Lawas Regency (which until 2007 was a part of South Tapanuli Regency). The town, which had 22,136 inhabitants as at mid 2023, has a website: http://sibuhuan.id and https://itsibuhuan.blogspot.com/
