= Batang Toru hydropower project =

Batang Toru Hydropower Project
- Location within Indonesia
- Official name: Batang Toru Hydropower Project
- Country: Indonesia
- Location: Sipirok, Marancar, Batang Toru Batang Toru
- Coordinates: 1°34′49.4″N 99°10′07.8″E
- Purpose: Water storage and Power generation
- Status: Under construction
- Construction began: December 21, 2015
- Opening date: 2022
- Owner: PT North Sumatera Hydro Energy

Dam and spillways
- Impounds: Batang Toru River

Power Station
- Turbines: 4 x 127.5 MW
- Installed capacity: 510 MW
- Annual generation: 2,124 GWh

Batang Toru hydropower plant is an under-construction hydropower plant project located in Batang Toru River in South Tapanuli District of North Sumatra Province in Indonesia. The power plant is scheduled to be operational in 2022 and designed to be 4x127.5 MW in capacity. Batang Toru hydropower plant is developed by PT North Sumatra Hydro Energy (PT NSHE), a company founded in 2008. The pre-construction phase of the power plant has been started after the Purchasing Power Agreement (PPA) contract with the National Electricity Company (PLN) was signed on December 21, 2015.

According to the Indonesian newspaper, Investor Daily, the Batang Toru hydropower plant would reduce carbon emissions by around 1.6 million tonnes of CO_{2} per year, or the equivalent of planting 12.3 million trees.

Batang Toru hydropower plant is meant to contribute to 15% of North Sumatra peak load electricity needs. The project is a part of Indonesian National Strategic Program to build a number power plants with the total capacity of 35,000 MW. The project is also a part of the national effort in reducing global warming through reduction of carbon emissions, an implementation of the Paris Agreement ratified by the Indonesian Government in Law No.16/2016. Batang Toru hydropower plant is set to contribute to carbon emission reduction at 1.6-2.2 MTon per year or 4% of the national target from the energy sector which equal to carbon absorption by 12.3 million trees.

The plant's construction was delayed in 2020 following funding concerns related to the environment (see Controversies below) and COVID-19. Due to this, state-owned electricity company PLN requested to push the facility's launch of commercial operations back from 2022 to 2025. As of 2022, PLN, along with Indonesian private companies, is still planning to build a hydroelectric plant on the area.

== Batang Toru Region ==
Batang Toru is a sub-district spread over three regencies: North Tapanuli, Central Tapanuli, and South Tapanuli in the North Sumatera Province, Indonesia. The area that spans some 163,000 hectares is rich in natural resources and biodiversity including:

- Protection Forest
- Conservation Forest
- Production Forest
- Areas for other purpose, allocated by the government for residentials, agriculture, mining etc.

Batang Toru area is currently being used for various purposes, including the Batang Toru Hydropower Plant which occupied area mainly covered by rubber plantation.

There are several land utilisations that dispersed the wildlife:

- Plantation
- Mining
- Roads
- Residential and Urban Area

Batang Toru River is the main river in the area, flowing from Tarutung, Humbang Hasundutan Regency, down to the Indian Ocean. Heavy erosion has been building up along its watershed for quite some time.

== Construction and operation ==
The Batang Toru hydropower plant project uses 122 hectares of land or about 0.07% of the Batang Toru ecosystem. The ecosystem also has protection forests, conservation forests, and production forests as well area for other non-forest-related purposes. The land being used in the project is designated as 'land allocated for other purposes' (also called APL in Indonesia) according to the Regional Spatial Plan and sits in the 163,000 hectares of Batang Toru region,

Land Allocation
| Land Uses | Land Area (Hectare) | Percentage |
|---|---|---|
| Protected Forest | 151,373 | 47.10 |
| Mining | 130,300 | 40.43 |
| Nature Reserve | 18,979 | 5.89 |
| Forest Concession | 17,000 | 5.27 |
| Community Plantation | 2,948 | 0.92 |
| Plantation Corporation | 1,325 | 0.41 |
| Geothermal | 130 | 0.04 |
| Batang Toru HEPP | 122 | 0.037 |
| Total | 322,177 | 100 |

The hydropower plant employs the run-of-river hydro model that does not require dams. Batang Toru Hydropower Plant utilizes daily ponds with water body area of 66.7 hectares.

Comparison between Capacity, Body of Water Area, and Population Relocation
| Hydropower plant | Capacity (MW) | Body of Water Area (Ha) | Population Relocation |
|---|---|---|---|
| Batangtoru | 510.00 | 66.7 | 0 |
| Jatiluhur | 187.50 | 8,300.00 | 5,002 |
| Saguling | 797.36 | 5,300.00 | 10,000 |
| Cirata | 1,008.00 | 6,200.00 | 10,000 |

Batang Toru Hydropower Plant doesn't drill deep, as the deepest tunnel is 300m under the ground. Tunnel construction does not require the opening of surface land and the soil from drilling will be collected in 185 hectares disposal areas which land is acquired from local resident. Therefore, it will not hoard the forests or cause fragmentation.

The natural flow rate of Batang Toru river is between 41.9 – 484 m^{^{3}}/s, with the lowest rate in July–August of 84 m^{^{3}}/s. It varies from day to day. On 23 September 2018, the flow rate can go as high as 514 m^{^{3}}/s and some villages in the downstream may be impacted.

Upon operation, the hydropower plant will regulate the water flow to maintain the ecological function of the river and for power generator. In rainy season, water will be released from the daily pondage through the control gate at 2.5 m^{^{3}}/s along with additional flow from tributaries between the pondage and the power house. With 4 turbines in full operations, the water will flow from the turbine at the rate of 207m^{^{3}}/s and will not cause flood. Looking at the flow rate of Batang Toru River, the chance for the hydropower plant to operate around the clock is very high and hence the water will flow at normal rate uninterrupted.

Road and other facilities are built in the area that is not old-growth forest. Of the 669 hectares licensed for this project, 122 hectares will be used for permanent building structures, 100 hectares for support function, and the remaining 446 hectares will be replanted and restored. Land clearing will only be performed along the riverbank. Arboreal bridges for the animals will be built in case the road constructions fragment the orangutans from the river.

The habitat of orangutan is spread across forests in 163,000 hectares of Batang Toru ecosystem (TFCA, 2018) – an area the size of London and larger than Jakarta. Orangutan continues to move, travels around 800-3,000 hectares of area. Survey of Kuswanda and Fitri (2017, 2018) indicates the density of nests around the project area is 0.41 per km, or one orangutan in 250 hectares. The Batang Toru Hydropower Plant occupied land of 122 hectares, smaller than the minimum area needed for a single orangutan.

== Controversies ==
The planned hydropower plant was announced in 2012, and is scheduled to be completed in 2022. It is expected to generate 510 megawatts of power, occupy 2.5 square miles, and cost US$1.6 billion to build. The Asian Development Bank and the World Bank's International Finance Corporation declined to fund the project due to environmental concerns. However, the Bank of China stepped in to fund it, and it will be built by Sinohydro, as part of China's ambitious "Belt and Road Initiative".

Scientists and environmentalists say that, in addition to impacting 10% of the critically endangered Tapanuli orangutan's already dwindling habitat, infrastructure for the dam (roads and high-voltage power lines) will fragment the orangutan population below viable levels by degrading important wildlife corridors, and increase the likelihood of even further development. The area is also home to other critically endangered animals, including the Sumatran tiger, Sumatran orangutan and Sunda pangolin. Between 70 and 100 square kilometers (27 and 39 square miles) could be cleared for the dam and reservoir. However, a spokesman for the developer, PT North Sumatra Hydro Energy, said that less than 6 square kilometres would be cleared and they would voluntarily abide by international standards for environmental and social impact assessment.

Although many indigenous community members have sold their land to the developers, some are vowing to fight the project. They have held local demonstrations, and even flew to Jakarta to protest in front of the presidential palace. The proposed dam will affect the livelihood of some 100,000 people who live downstream.

The project lies near a fault line, and there is a risk of earthquakes, but this was not mentioned in the environmental assessment for the project. On this and other bases, the Indonesian environmental group WALHI is planning a lawsuit to halt construction.
