= Arse, Indonesia =

Arse
- District
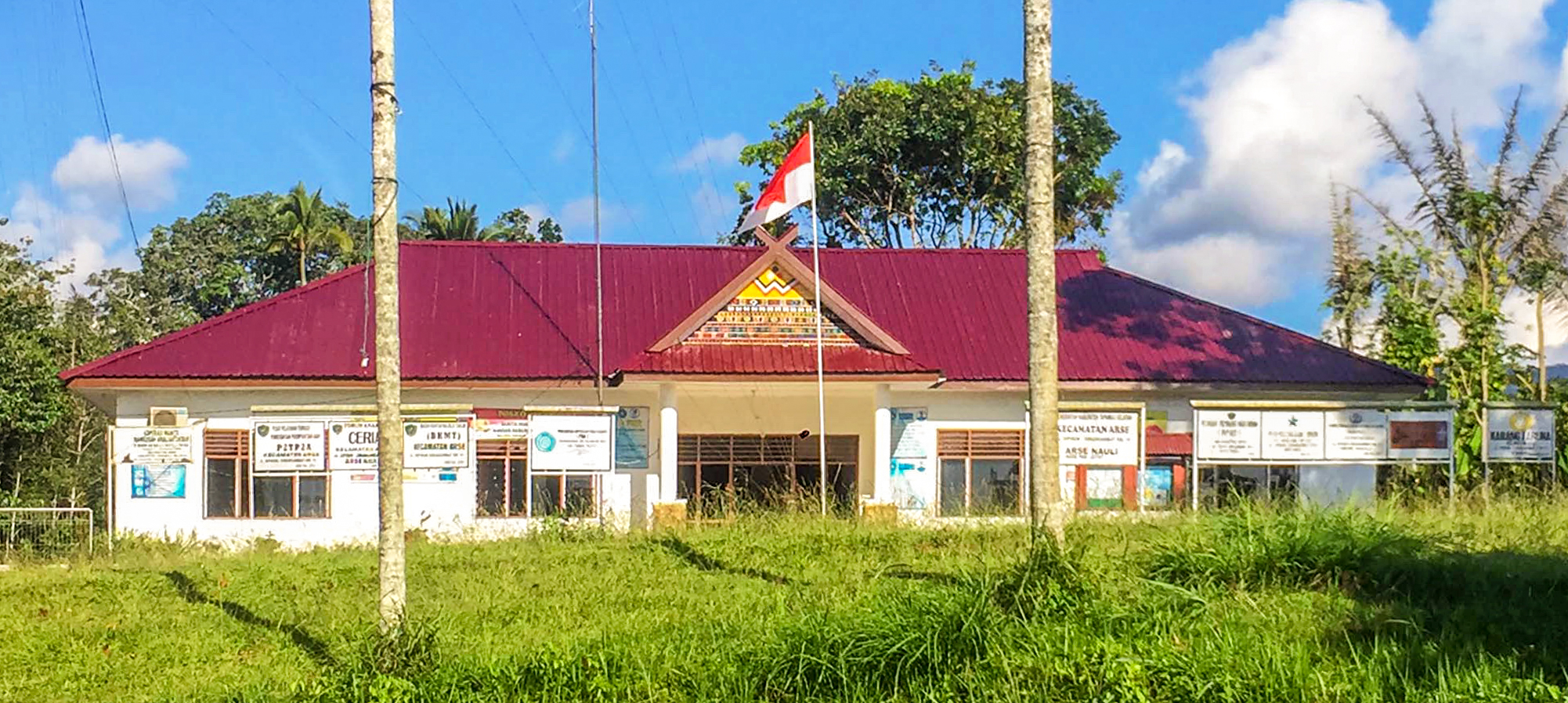
- District Office of Arse

- Map Location of the District of Arse in South Tapanuli
- Coordinates: 1.6949267°N 99.2934205°E
- Country: Indonesia
- Province: North Sumatra
- Regency: South Tapanuli
- District: Arse
- District Capital: Arse Nauli

Area
  - Total: 265.90 km^{2} (102.66 sq mi)
- Time zone: Indonesia Western Time
- Website: www.tapselkab.go.id

Arse is a district in the South Tapanuli Regency, North Sumatra province of Sumatra, Indonesia. It is located in the northern part of the island of Sumatra, around 220 kilometres (140 mi) south-east of the city of Medan. The district of Arse lies to the south of Saipar Dolok Hole.

The nearest airport to Arse is Ferdinand Lumban Tobing Airport, near the city of Sibolga, approximately 60 kilometres (37 mi) west of the district.

The Arse district is divided into ten communities: Sipogu, Lancat, Natambang Roncitan, Nanggar Jati, Nanggar Jati Huta Padang, Aek Haminjon, Pardomuan, Dalihan Natolu, and the capital town Arse Nauli. As of the 2020 census, the population of Arse was 8,677. The population is mostly Muslim, with a small number of Protestant Christians.

Map showing the subdivisions of Arse, with the community of Arse Nauli highlighted

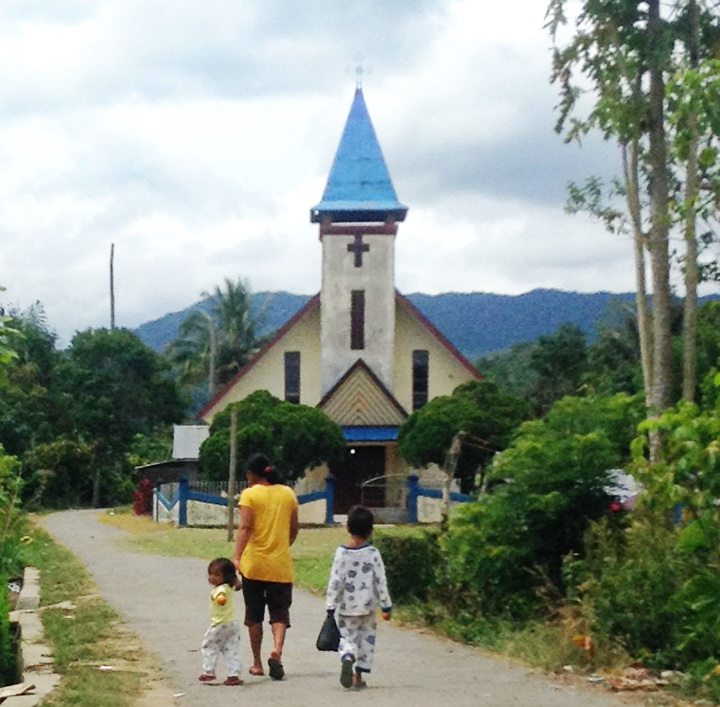
Church in Arse
