= Saipar Dolok Hole =

Coordinates: 1°49′N 99°26′E

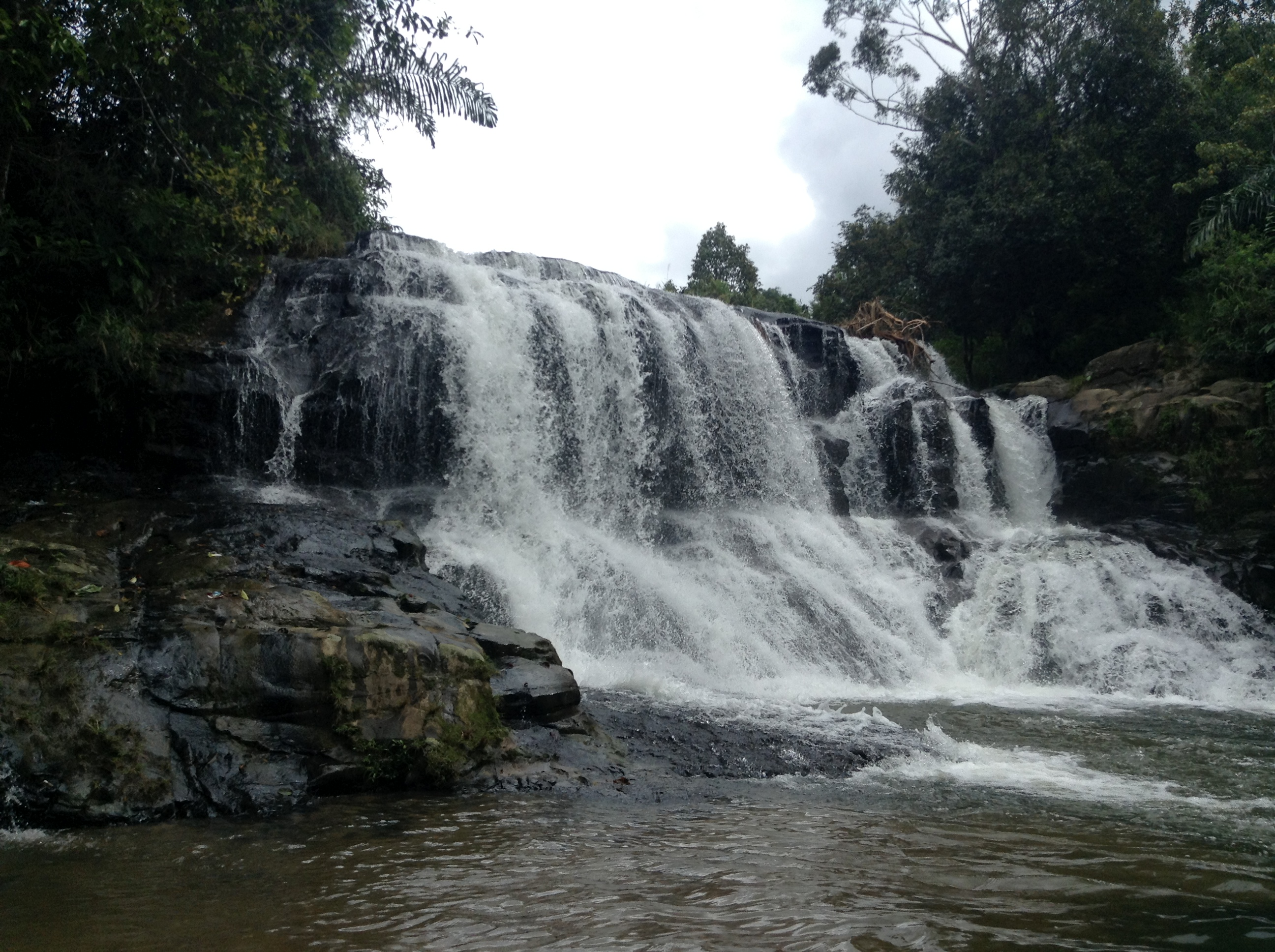
Waterfall in Damparan Hauntas, Saipar Dolok Hole, South Tapanuli Regency

Saipar Dolok Hole is a district in South Tapanuli Regency in North Sumatra province, Sumatra, Indonesia. The village of Sipagimbar is the capital of the district. Saipar Dolok Hole is bordered to the south by the district of Arse.

According to the 2020 census, the population of Sapar Dolok Hole was 13,940. Sights include the Sampuran waterfall in the village of Damparan Hauntas.
