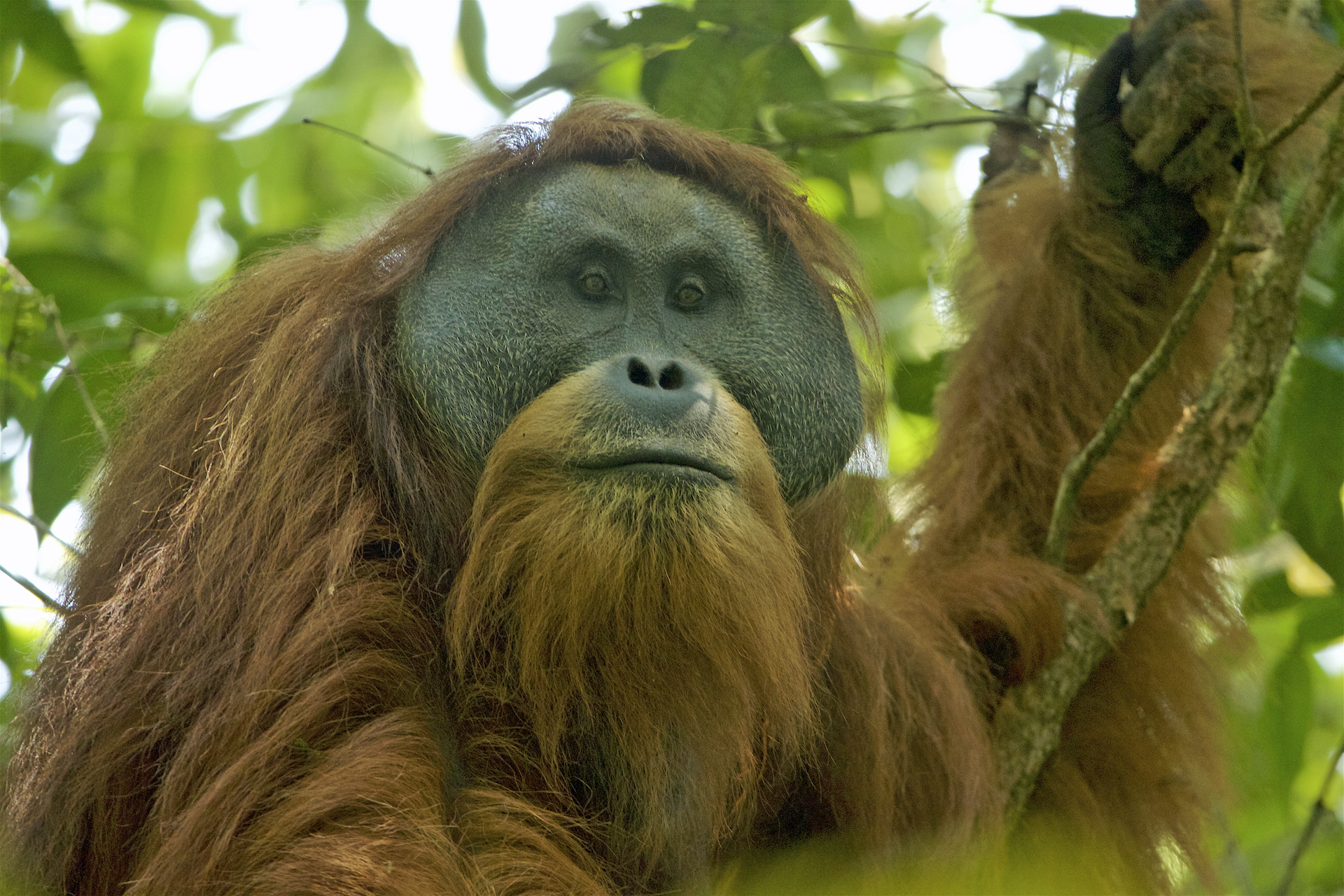
- Adult male
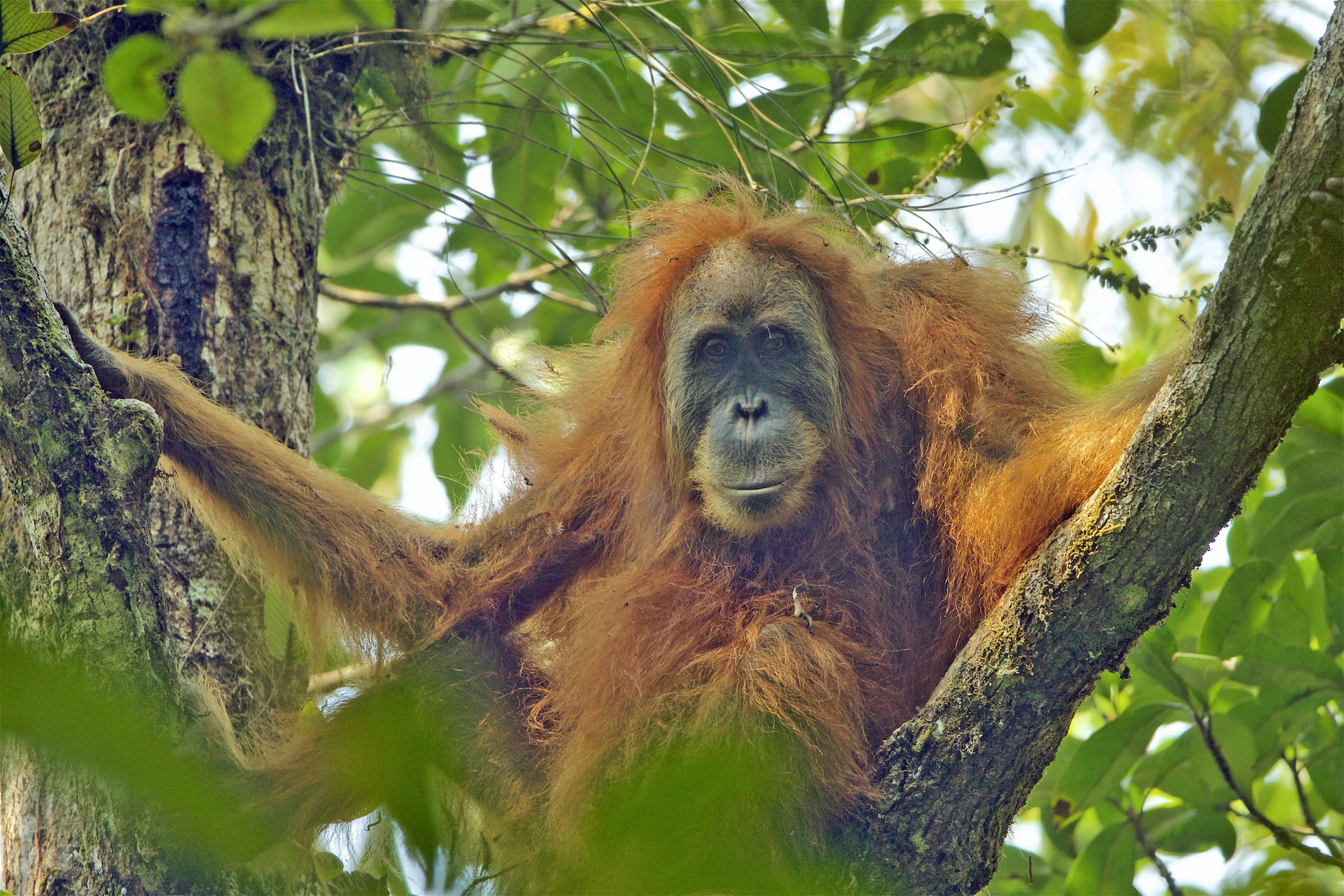
- Adult female Both near Lake Toba

Conservation status
- Critically Endangered (IUCN 3.1)
- CITES Appendix I

Scientific classification
- Kingdom: Animalia
- Phylum: Chordata
- Class: Mammalia
- Order: Primates
- Superfamily: Hominoidea
- Family: Hominidae
- Genus: Pongo
- Species: P. tapanuliensis

Binomial name
- Pongo tapanuliensis Nurcahyo, Meijaard, Nowak, Fredriksson & Groves, 2017 (Note: The description of the Tapanuli orangutan was a collaboration between 37 scientists from institutions around the world, but its binomial name (scientific name) was provided by the five scientists cited here.)
- Approximate location in Sumatra

= Tapanuli orangutan =

Species of ape

The Tapanuli orangutan (Pongo tapanuliensis) is a species of orangutan restricted to South Tapanuli in the island of Sumatra in Indonesia. It is one of three known living species of orangutan, alongside the Sumatran orangutan (P. abelii), found farther northwest on the island, and the Bornean orangutan (P. pygmaeus). It was described as a distinct species in 2017. As of 2018, there are roughly 800 individuals of this species and it is currently on the critically endangered species list.

== Taxonomy ==
=== Discovery and naming ===
An isolated population of orangutans in the Batang Toru area of South Tapanuli was reported in 1939. The population was rediscovered by an expedition to the area in 1997, but it was not recognized as a distinct species then. Pongo tapanuliensis was identified as a distinct species, following a detailed phylogenetic study in 2017. The study analyzed the genetic samples of 37 wild orangutans from populations across Sumatra and Borneo and conducted a morphological analysis of the skeletons of 34 adult males. The holotype of the species is the complete skeleton of an adult male from Batang Toru who died after being wounded by locals in November 2013. The holotype is stored in the Zoological Museum of Bogor. The skull and teeth of the Batang Toru male differ significantly from those of the other two orangutan species. Comparisons of the genomes of all 37 orangutans using principal component analysis and population genetic models also indicated that the Batang Toru population is a separate species.

The specific name, tapanuliensis, as well as the common name, Tapanuli orangutan, refer to Tapanuli, the hilly region in North Sumatra where the species lives.

=== Phylogeny ===
Genetic comparisons show that Tapanuli orangutans diverged from Sumatran orangutans about 3.4 million years ago, and became more isolated after the Lake Toba eruption that occurred about 75,000 years ago. They had continued sporadic contact that stopped between 10,000 and 20,000 years ago. Tapanuli orangutans diverged from Bornean orangutans about 674,000 years ago. Orangutans were able to travel from Sumatra to Borneo because the islands were connected by land bridges as parts of Sundaland during recent glacial periods when sea levels were much lower. The present range of Tapanuli orangutans is thought to be close to the area where ancestral orangutans first entered what is now Indonesia from mainland Asia.

== Description ==
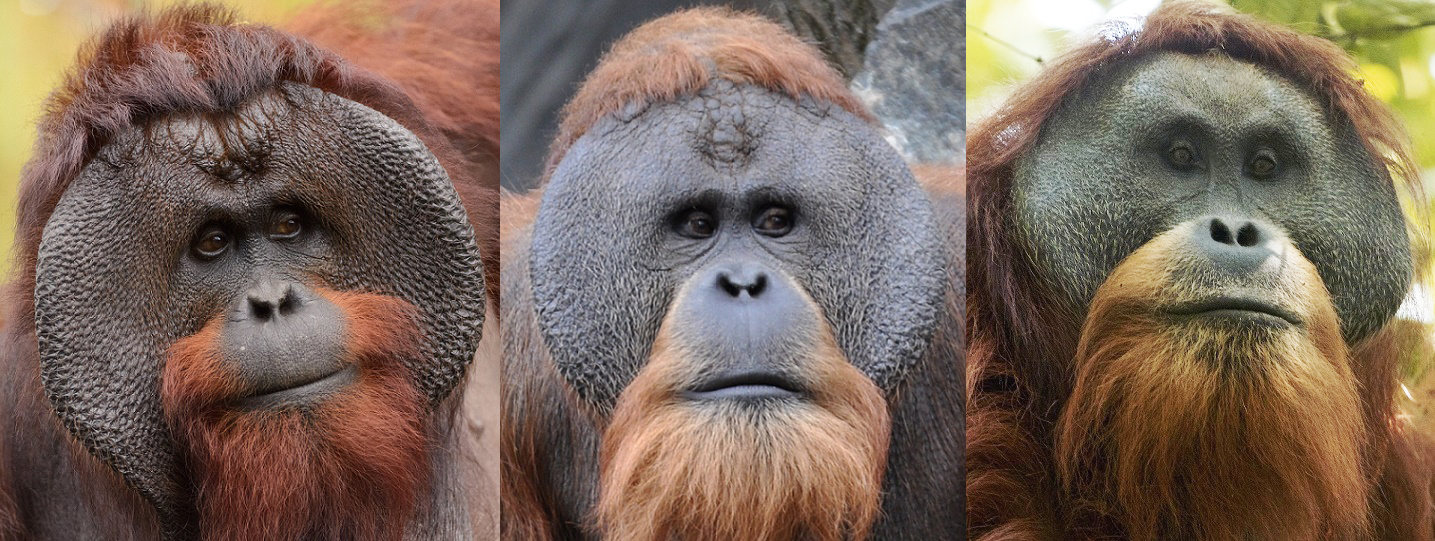
Males of each orangutan species (from left to right): Bornean, Sumatran, Tapanuli

Tapanuli orangutans resemble Sumatran orangutans more than Bornean orangutans in body build and fur color. However, they have frizzier hair, smaller heads, and flatter and wide faces. Dominant male Tapanuli orangutans have prominent moustaches and large flat cheek pads, known as flanges, covered in downy hair. The Tapanuli orangutan differs from the other two existing orangutan species in several specific features:

- their upper canines are larger;
- they have a shallower face depth;
- their pharyngotympanic tube is shorter;
- they have a shorter mandibular joint;
- they have a narrower maxillary incisor row;
- the distance across the palate at the first molars are narrower;
- there is a smaller horizontal length between the mandibular symphysis;
- they have a smaller inferior torus; and
- the width of the ascending ramus located in the mandible.

As with other two orangutan species, males are larger than females; males are 137 cm (54 in) in height and 70–90 kg (150–200 lb) in weight, females are 110 cm (43 in) in height and 40–50 kg (88–110 lb) in weight. When comparing the Tapanuli orangutan with the Pongo abelii, the Tapanuli orangutan has a deeper suborbital fossa, a triangular pyriform aperture, and a facial profile that is more angled.

== Behavior ==
The loud, long-distance call or 'long call' of male Tapanuli orangutans has a higher maximum frequency than that of Sumatran orangutans, and lasts much longer and has more pulses than that of Bornean orangutans. Their diet is also unique, containing unusual items like caterpillars and conifer cones. Tapanuli orangutans are thought to be exclusively arboreal as scientists have not seen them descend to the ground in over 3,000 hours of observation. This is probably due to the presence of Sumatran tigers in the area. Their other main predators are Sunda clouded leopards, Sumatran dholes and saltwater crocodiles. Tapanuli orangutans have slow reproductive rates, causing a problem in increasing population.

== Habitat and distribution ==
Tapanuli orangutans live in tropical and subtropical moist broadleaf forests located south of Lake Toba in Sumatra. The entirety of the species is found in an area of about 1,000 km^{2} (390 sq mi) at elevations from 300 to 1,300 m (980 to 4,300 ft). Tapanuli orangutans are separated from the island's other species of orangutan, the Sumatran orangutan, by just 100 km (62 mi).

== Conservation ==
With fewer than 800 individuals restricted to an area of about 1,000 km^{2} (390 sq mi), the Tapanuli orangutan is the rarest great ape. It is listed as critically endangered by the International Union for Conservation of Nature (IUCN) because of hunting, conflict with humans, the illegal wildlife trade, rampant habitat destruction for small scale agriculture, mining and a proposed hydroelectric dam, the Batang Toru hydropower project, in the area with the highest density of orangutans, which could impact up to 10% of its already dwindling habitat and degrade important wildlife corridors. Conservationists predict an 83% decline in three generations (75 years) if the necessary conservation measures and practices are not implemented. Inbreeding depression is likely due to the small population size and fragmented range. This is supported by the genomes of the two Tapanuli orangutan individuals, which show signs of inbreeding. In August 2019 Swiss environmental group PanEco, which is a partner in the Sumatran Orangutan Conservation Programme, dropped its previous opposition to the dam, several months after firing several researchers who opposed the new strategy.

In December 2025, following Cyclone Senyar that affected the northern part of Sumatra, it was estimated that between 6.2% to 10.5% out of the fewer than 800 remaining Tapanuli orangutans were killed by the floods and landslides.
