= Gunung Tua =

Town and district in North Sumatra, Indonesia

Coordinates: 2°10′N 98°32′E

Gunung Tua is a town (kelurahan) in Padang Bolak administrative district (kecamatan) in the North Sumatra province of Indonesia. The town is the seat (capital) of North Padang Lawas Regency. Until 2007 Gunung Tua town and Padang Bolak district were part of South Tapanuli Regency, but on 17 July 2007, Gunung Tua was made the capital of the newly created North Padang Lawas Regency. The town had 14,460 inhabitants in mid 2023.

== Climate ==
Gunung Tua has a tropical rainforest climate (Af) with moderate rainfall from June to August and heavy rainfall in the remaining months.

Climate data for Gunung Tua
Month	Jan	Feb	Mar	Apr	May	Jun	Jul	Aug	Sep	Oct	Nov	Dec	Year
Mean daily maximum °C (°F)	31.3 (88.3)	31.6 (88.9)	31.7 (89.1)	31.6 (88.9)	31.8 (89.2)	31.5 (88.7)	31.2 (88.2)	31.0 (87.8)	30.6 (87.1)	30.5 (86.9)	30.5 (86.9)	30.7 (87.3)	31.2 (88.1)
Daily mean °C (°F)	26.0 (78.8)	26.2 (79.2)	26.5 (79.7)	26.6 (79.9)	26.8 (80.2)	26.4 (79.5)	26.0 (78.8)	26.0 (78.8)	25.8 (78.4)	25.9 (78.6)	25.9 (78.6)	25.9 (78.6)	26.2 (79.1)
Mean daily minimum °C (°F)	20.8 (69.4)	20.8 (69.4)	21.3 (70.3)	21.7 (71.1)	21.8 (71.2)	21.3 (70.3)	20.9 (69.6)	21.0 (69.8)	21.1 (70.0)	21.3 (70.3)	21.3 (70.3)	21.1 (70.0)	21.2 (70.1)
Average rainfall mm (inches)	278 (10.9)	199 (7.8)	231 (9.1)	215 (8.5)	161 (6.3)	91 (3.6)	66 (2.6)	129 (5.1)	177 (7.0)	229 (9.0)	241 (9.5)	266 (10.5)	2,283 (89.9)
Source: Climate-Data.org
