= Toru River =

River in Indonesia

Coordinates: 1.431°N 98.7821°E

Toru River Sungai Toru, Batang Toru, Air Batang Toru, Air Batang Toroe, Batang Toroe
- Location of river mouth Toru River (Sumatra) Toru River (Indonesia)

Location
- Country: Indonesia

Physical characteristics
- Source
  - location: North Sumatra

The Toru River or Batang Toru is a river in northern Sumatra, Indonesia, about 1200 km northwest of the capital Jakarta.

== Geography ==
The river flows in the northern area of Sumatra with predominantly tropical rainforest climate (designated as Af in the Köppen-Geiger climate classification). The annual average temperature in the area is 24 °C. The warmest month is February, when the average temperature is around 26 °C, and the coldest is May, at 22 °C. The average annual rainfall is 3379 mm. The wettest month is November, with an average of 520 mm rainfall, and the driest is July, with 156 mm rainfall. The area of the river is located on the Great Sumatran Fault Zone, providing the area with an abundance of geothermal energy sources and hot water springs, while also increasing the frequency of large earthquakes.

== Ecology ==
The river flows at the heart of the area where the Tapanuli orangutan lives, a kind of orangutan which was identified as a separate species in 2017.

== Uses ==
The Batang Toru hydropower project has started work on a dam and tunnel, financed by China, which is meant to provide electric power during 6 hours a day. As of 2022, Indonesian state-owned electronic distribution company Perusahaan Listrik Negara has also started to work with Indonesian private companies to establish a hydropower on the river.

== See also ==
- List of drainage basins of Indonesia
- List of rivers of Indonesia
- List of rivers of Sumatra
