= Terbit Rencana Perangin Angin =

Indonesian politician (born 1972)

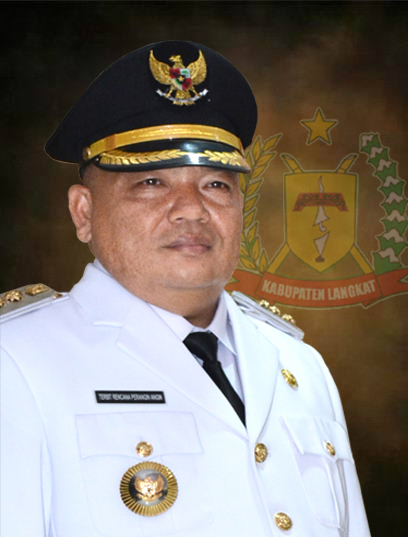

10th Regent of Langkat
- In office 20 February 2019 – 19 January 2022 (suspended)
- President: Joko Widodo
- Governor: Edy Rahmayadi
- Deputy: Syah Afandin
- Preceded by: Ngogesa Sitepu
- Succeeded by: Syah Afandin (acting)

Leader of Langkat Regional People's Representative Council
- In office 2014–2018
- President: Joko Widodo
- Governor: Gatot Pujo Nugroho; Tengku Erry Nuradi
- Regent: Ngogesa Sitepu

Personal details
- Born: 24 June 1972 (age 53) Raja Tengah, Kuala, Langkat, North Sumatra, Indonesia
- Party: Golkar

Terbit Rencana Perangin Angin (born 24 June 1972) is an Indonesian politician who served as the regent of Langkat from 2019 until his suspension in 2022. He was previously the leader of Langkat Regional People's Representative Council from 2014 to 2018.

He was elected as Bupati in 2018, and began serving his five-year term on 20 February 2019, until his suspension on 19 January 2022 on suspicion of corruption. Further revelations included accusations of slavery, torture, and wildlife crimes.

== Background ==
Terbit was born in Langkat, and went to primary school and junior high school near his home of Raja Tengah, Kuala district, Langkat, followed by high school in the nearby city of Medan, and then studied management in the other nearby local city, Binjai.

Terbit was elected leader of the Langkat branch of the Pancasila Youth, a paramilitary organization in 1997, and re-elected every 4 years subsequently until his arrest. In 2002 he became Langkat leader of FSPTI/SPSI, a transport workers' union.

In 2014 Terbit was elected as head of the DPRD (local regional parliament) for Langkat, as head of the largest party, Golkar, for the 2015–2020 period.

== Corruption investigation ==
Terbit was arrested as part of a corruption investigation by the KPK (Corruption Eradication Commission), in January 2022.

Subsequently, further revelations gave him international notoriety: a cage was found with people in it, said to be used for modern slavery, and protected wildlife was discovered on his property, including an orangutan and 2 Bali starlings.

=== Corruption ===
A total of six people were arrested in connection with corruption in government contracts, and 2.1 billion rupiah (around US$150,000) in Indonesian and foreign cash was recovered. The others arrested:

- Iskandar Perangin-angin, Terbit's older brother, and elected administrative village head ('kepala desa') for the neighboring village of Balai Kasih.
- Marcos Surya Abdi, Shuhandra Citra, and Isfi Syahfitra, three contractors accused of receiving bribes
- Muara Perangin-angin, as contractor accused of paying a bribe.

=== Slavery and torture accusations, deaths ===
A cage containing human occupants was found on Terbit's property. It was said that the inmates were used for slave labour on Terbit's palm oil plantation. The inmates were found with bruises when the cage was discovered by investigators.

The wife of one of the inmates said that she sent her husband there for drug treatment. However, after it was disclosed that Terbit had no permit to run a drug treatment facility, he said that the cage did not constitute drug 'rehabilitation' but merely 'training' for drug addicts, and had been operating informally for many years under the auspices of the Pemuda Pancasila, with the knowledge of local authorities.

A video posted on Terbit's wife Tiorita's YouTube channel in March 2021, stated that Terbit and Tiorita ran a 'drug guidance' facility at their home. They stated that as a mother, it was Tiorita who responsible for providing food for the patients, as being a mother she would understand this well.

The police said they had received three reports of deaths of the inmates, in 2015 and 2021, and that they had found graves on the site. Investigators stated that certain code words ('2½ buttons', 'mos' and 'das') were used when torturing inmates to indicate the type of punishment, and that this torture resulted in the deaths of inmates. Terbit acknowledged that there had been deaths of inmates. Terbit's son Dewa Rencana Perangin-angin was convicted in November 2022 of torturing an inmate to death and received a prison sentence.

Terbit stood trial in 2024 for human trafficking in connection with the slavery allegations. He was acquitted by a three-judge panel on 9 July. Four months later, the Supreme Court of Indonesia overturned the verdict and pronounced Terbit guilty, sentencing him to imprisonment for four years on November 15.

=== Wildlife crimes ===
Seven protected animals were found on Terbit's property.

- a Celebes crested macaque
- a Sumatran orangutan
- a Changeable hawk-eagle
- 2 Bali starlings
- a Common hill myna
