= Soekirman =

Indonesian diplomat (died 1982)

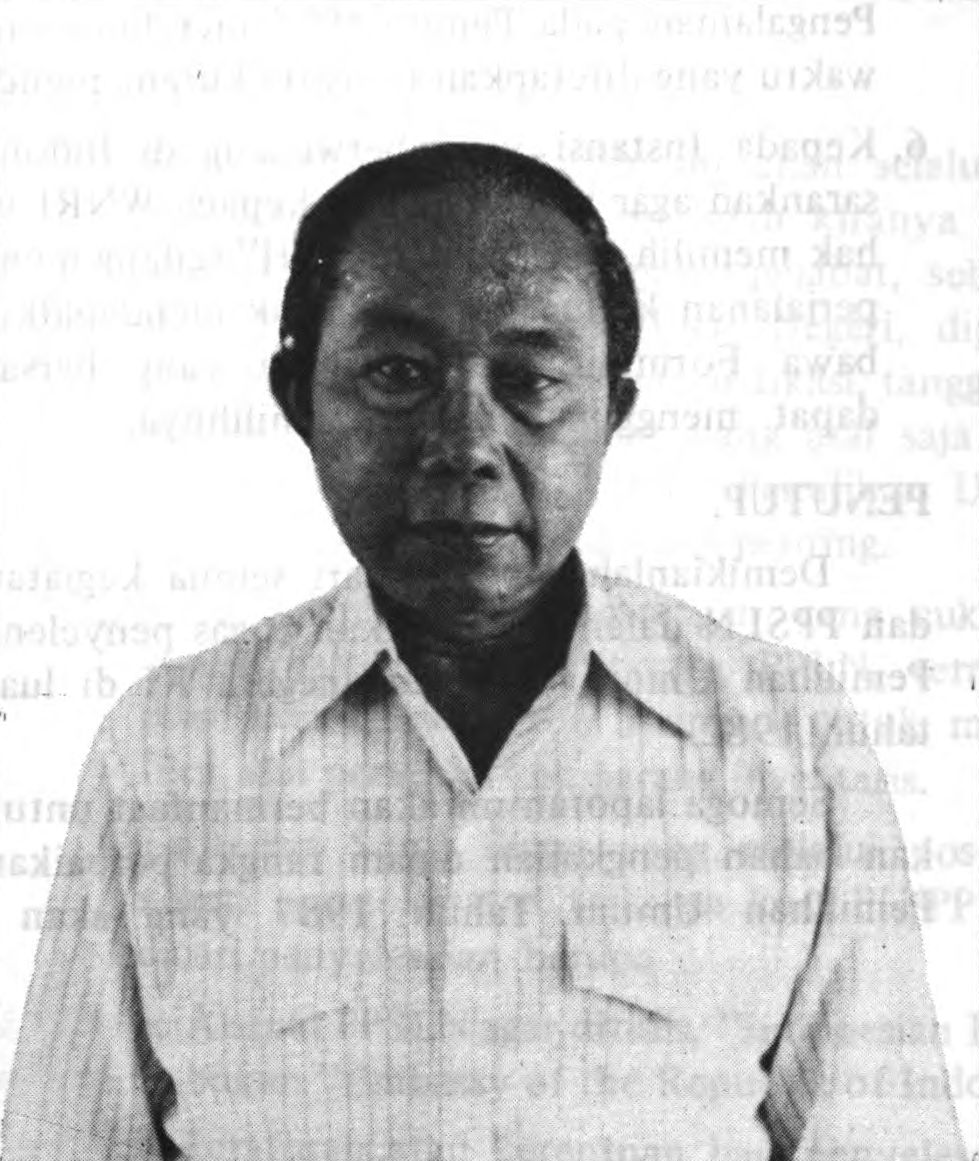

Ambassador of Indonesia to Sri Lanka
- In office 1972–1976
- Preceded by: Abdul Hamid
- Succeeded by: Adlinsyah Jenie

Personal details
- Died: 12 June 1982

Raden Soekirman (died 12 June 1982) was an Indonesian career diplomat who was Indonesia's ambassador to Sri Lanka, with residence in Colombo, from 1972 to 1976. Prior to his ambassadorial posting, he was stationed at Indonesia's consulate general in Tokyo and at the embassy in Washington D.C. He was the deputy chair of the overseas election committee for the 1982 Indonesian legislative election at the time of his death.

== Diplomatic career ==
Soekirman was commercial consul at the consulate general in Tokyo in the mid-1950s, serving for a few months as acting consul general before the consulate general was upgraded to an embassy. By the start of the 1960s, was the commercial counsellor at the embassy in Washington D.C. He served in the bilateral economic cooperation directorate of foreign department, where he took part in the consultative meeting for the Colombo Plan in 1968. By the turn of the 1970s Soekirman was appointed to the embassy in Tokyo with the rank of minister, second only to ambassador Ashari Danudirdjo.

On 17 June 1972, Soekirman was installed as ambassador to Sri Lanka. As ambassador, Soekirman led Indonesia's delegation in Colombo Plan consultative meetings until the end of his ambassadorial term in 1976. At the 127th session of the Colombo Plan Council in 1975, Soekirman nominated Malaysian ambassador Mustapha bin Dato Mahmud, which was elected unanimously for a one-year term from May 1975 to June 1976. Soekirman retired from the foreign service thereafter.

In the lead-up to the 1982 Indonesian legislative election, on 16 January 1981 Soekirman was appointed as the deputy chairman of the central overseas election committee, and was inducted into office on 4 March 1981. Soekirman was responsible for briefing Indonesian diplomatic missions in the Asia-Pacific region on matters pertraining to the election. Soekirman died on 12 June 1982, shortly after the conclusion of the 1982 election.
