= Gido =

Gido is a given name. Notable people with the name include:

- Gido Babilonia (1966–2007), Filipino basketball player
- Gido Kokars (1921–2017), Latvian conductor
- Gidō Shūshin (1325–1388), Japanese Zen monk

== See also ==
- Gino (given name)
