= Aek Kanopan =

Town and district in North Labuhan Batu Regency, North Sumatra Province of Indonesia

Coordinates: 2°34′N 99°39′E

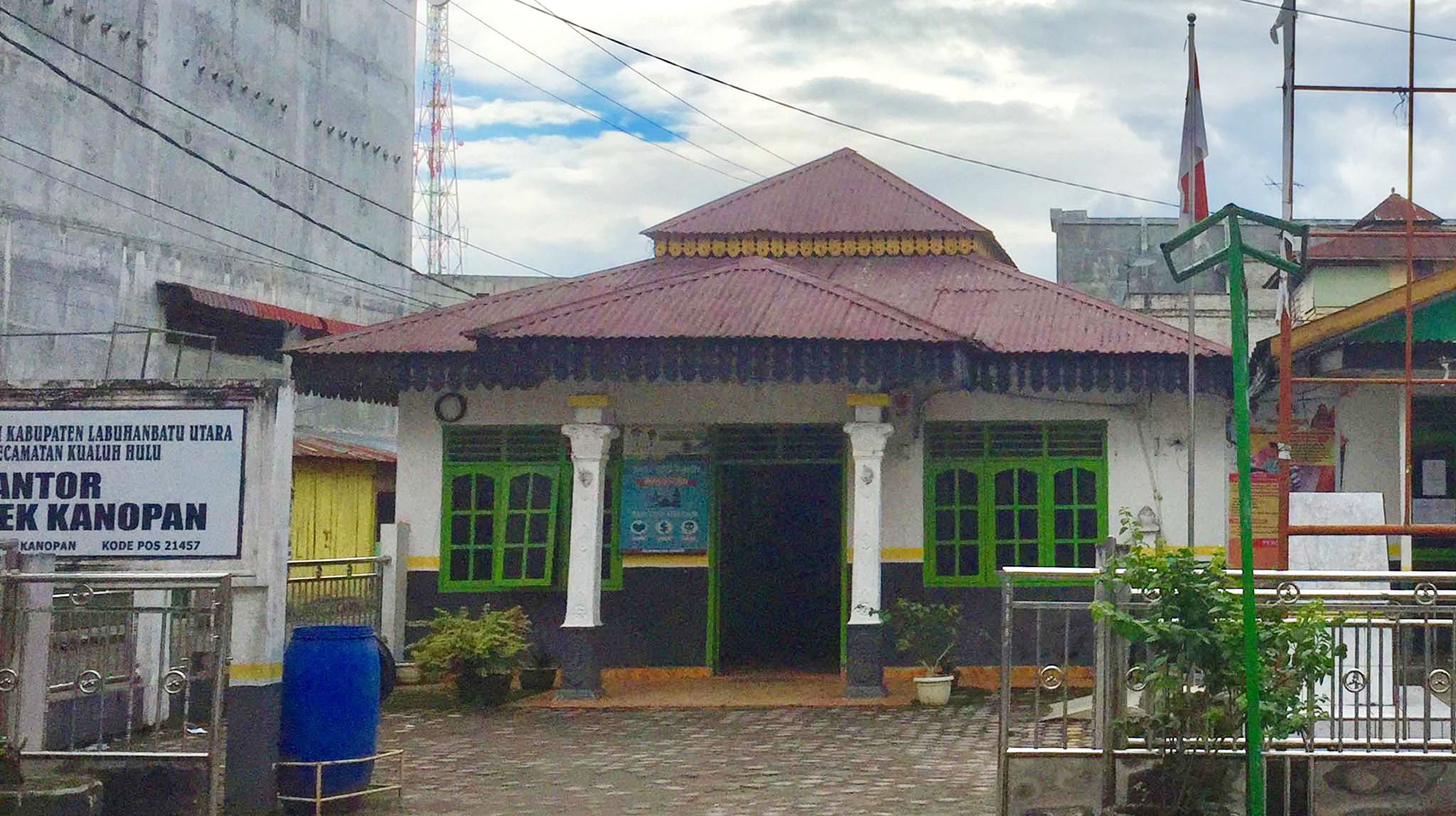
Aek Kanopan in 2019

Aek Kanopan is a town and district (kecamatan) in North Labuhan Batu Regency, North Sumatra Province of Indonesia, and it is the seat of North Labuhan Batu Regency.

== Climate ==
Aek Kanopan has a tropical rainforest climate (Af) with heavy to very heavy rainfall year-round.

Climate data for Aek Kanopan
Month	Jan	Feb	Mar	Apr	May	Jun	Jul	Aug	Sep	Oct	Nov	Dec	Year
Mean daily maximum °C (°F)	31.3 (88.3)	31.5 (88.7)	31.9 (89.4)	31.9 (89.4)	32.1 (89.8)	31.9 (89.4)	31.7 (89.1)	31.4 (88.5)	31.1 (88.0)	30.8 (87.4)	30.6 (87.1)	30.7 (87.3)	31.4 (88.5)
Daily mean °C (°F)	26.4 (79.5)	26.4 (79.5)	26.8 (80.2)	27.0 (80.6)	27.3 (81.1)	27.0 (80.6)	26.8 (80.2)	26.6 (79.9)	26.6 (79.9)	26.4 (79.5)	26.2 (79.2)	26.2 (79.2)	26.6 (80.0)
Mean daily minimum °C (°F)	21.5 (70.7)	21.4 (70.5)	21.8 (71.2)	22.2 (72.0)	22.5 (72.5)	22.1 (71.8)	21.9 (71.4)	21.8 (71.2)	22.1 (71.8)	22.1 (71.8)	21.9 (71.4)	21.7 (71.1)	21.9 (71.5)
Average rainfall mm (inches)	178 (7.0)	117 (4.6)	153 (6.0)	165 (6.5)	183 (7.2)	154 (6.1)	150 (5.9)	188 (7.4)	270 (10.6)	310 (12.2)	254 (10.0)	237 (9.3)	2,359 (92.8)
Source: Climate-Data.org
