= North Padang Lawas Regency =

Regency in North Sumatra, Indonesia

Coordinates: 1.4601°N 99.6735°E

North Padang Lawas Regency Kabupaten Padang Lawas Utara
- Regency
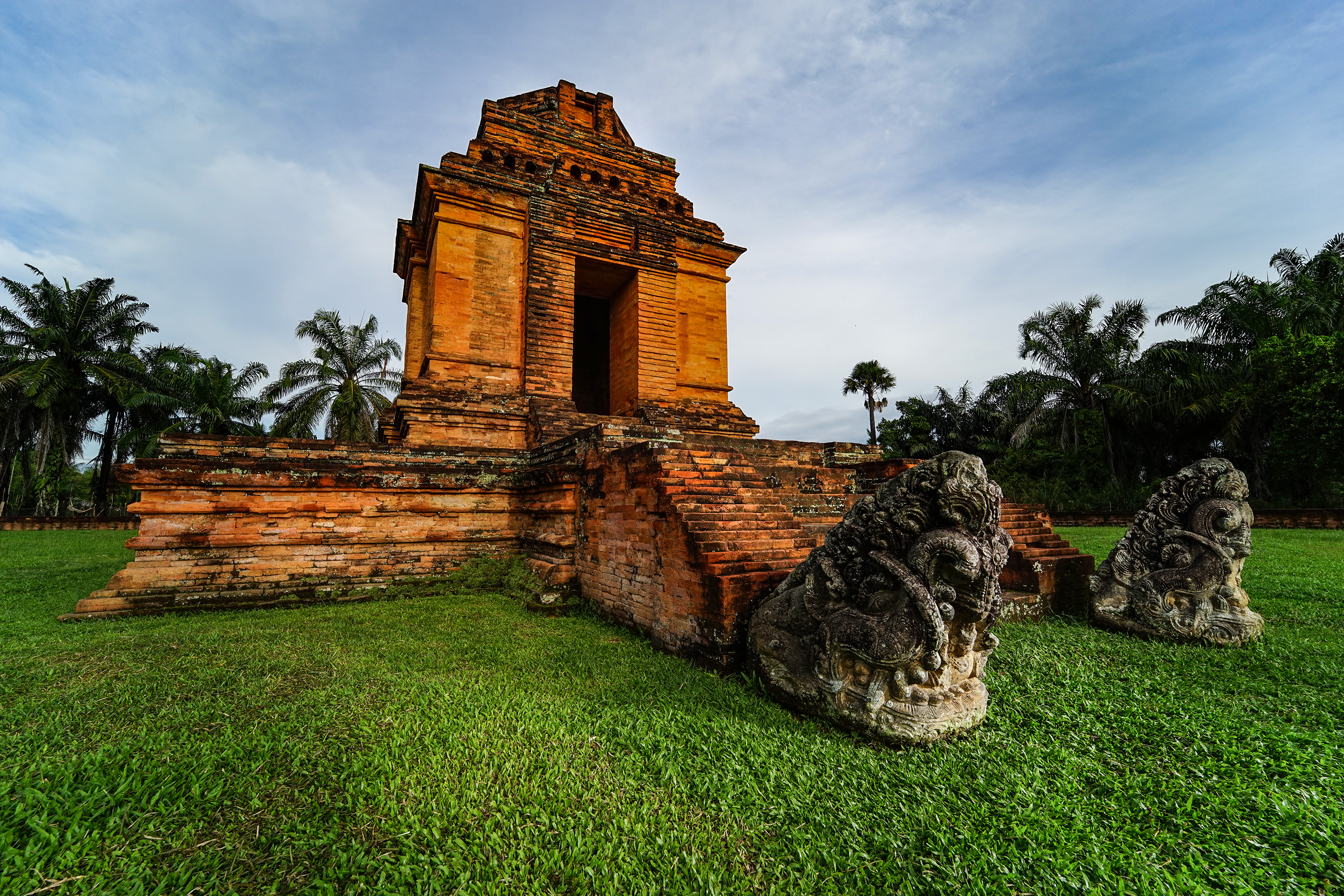
- Bahal temple in Portibi

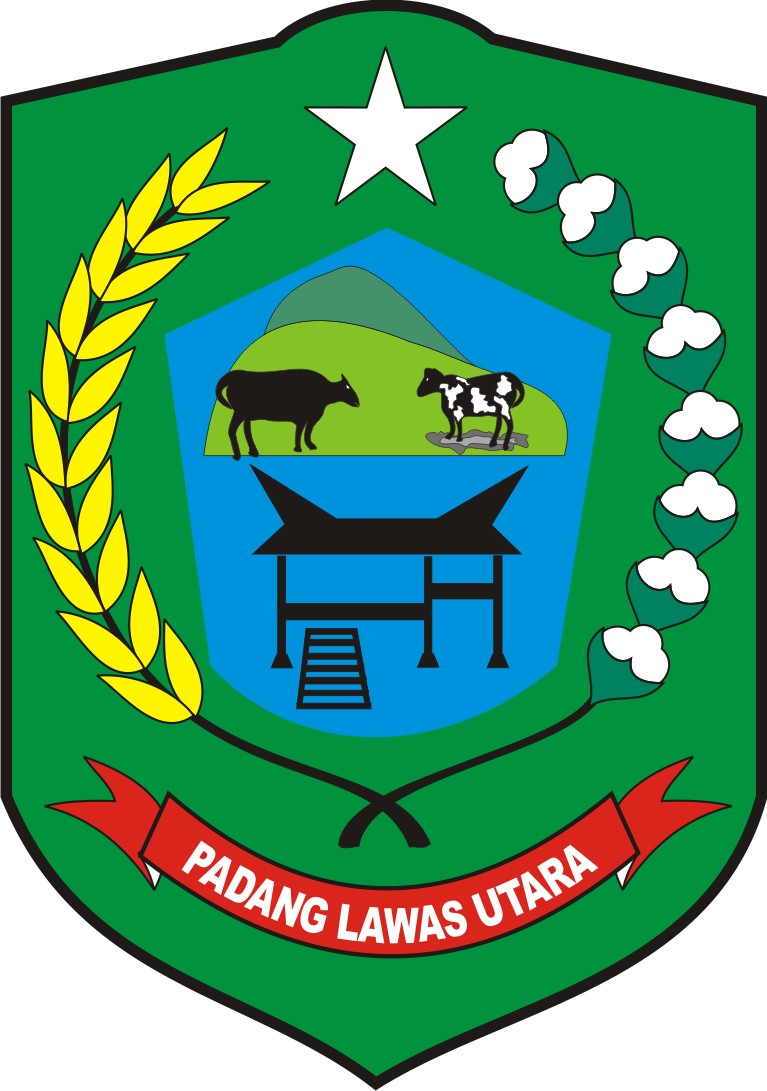
- Coat of arms

- Country: Indonesia
- Province: North Sumatra
- Regency seat: Gunung Tua

Government
  - Regent: Reski Basyah Harahap
  - Vice Regent: Basri Harahap
  - Chairman of Council of Representatives: Mukhlis Harahap (Golkar)
  - Vice Chairmen of Council of Representatives: Abdul Gafur Simanjuntak (Gerindra) and Basri Harahap (Partai Demokrat)

Area
  - Total: 3,945.56 km^{2} (1,523.39 sq mi)

Population (mid 2025 estimate)
  - Total: 285,659
  - Density: 72.4001/km^{2} (187.515/sq mi)
- Time zone: UTC+7 (WIB)
- Website: padanglawasutarakab.go.id

North Padang Lawas (Padang Lawas Utara, abbreviated as Paluta) is a landlocked regency in the North Sumatra province of Indonesia. It has an area of 3,945.56 km^{2}, and had a population of 223,049 at the 2010 census and 260,720 at the 2020 census; the official estimate as of mid 2025 was 285,659 - and projected to rise to 290,671 by mid 2026. North Padang Lawas Regency was created on 17 July 2007 (along with a separate Padang Lawas Regency to the south) from the eastern parts of the South Tapanuli Regency. Its administrative seat is the town of Gunung Tua.

== Demographics ==
=== Population ===
The population of North Padang Lawas in the 2010 census results was 223,049 people with a density of 57 per square kilometre, which in 2020 increased to 260,720 people with annual population growth averaging around 2.18%. The official estimate as of mid 2025 was 285,659 (comprising 145,530 males and 140,130 females).

=== Ethnic ===
The population of North Padang Lawas district is quite ethnically diverse. Overall, the majority of the population comes from the Batak Angkola people, including various Angkola Batak clans, such as Harahap, Lubis, Siregar, Nasution, Hasibuan, Daulay, Dalimunte, Hutasuhut, Batubara. In addition, Batak Toba, Nias, and Javanese are also quite numerous in North Padang Lawas.

=== Religion ===
Followers of religion Islam amounted to 90.40%, then Protestantism 9.21%, Catholicism at 0.38% and Buddhism around 0.01%. The Batak people of Angkola, Mandailing, Minangkabau, and Javanese, generally embrace Islam. Meanwhile, the ethnic Batak Toba, Karo, Simalungun, and Nias people, mostly embrace Christianity. Meanwhile, there are 593 mosques, 34 Protestant churches, and 1 Catholic church.

== Administrative districts ==
At the 2010 census, the regency was divided into nine districts (kecamatan). Subsequently, three additional districts (Padang Bolak Tenggara, Ujung Batu, and Halongonan Timur) have been created by the division of existing districts. The districts are tabulated below with their areas and their populations at the 2010 census and the 2020 census, together with the official estimates as of mid 2025. The table also includes the locations of the district administrative centres, the number of villages in each district (totaling 386 rural desa and 2 urban kelurahan), and its postcode.

Kode Wilayah	Name of District (kecamatan)	Area in km^{2}	Pop'n census 2010	Pop'n census 2020	Pop'n estimate mid 2025	Admin centre	No. of villages	Post code
12.20.07	Batang Onang	295.82	12,790	13,770	14,499	Pasar Matanggor	32 ^{(a)}	22762
12.20.05	Padang Bolak Julu	230.93	9,972	11,542	12,594	Batu Gana	23	22753
12.20.06	Portibi	191.98	23,228	27,425	30,654	Portibi Jae	36	22741
12.20.04	Padang Bolak	616.46	58,560	53,998	61,247	Pasar Gunung Tua	62 ^{(b)}	22754
12.20.10	Padang Bolak Tenggara (Southeast Padang Bolak)	117.55	^{(c)}	11,743	12,960	Naga Saribu	14	22751
12.20.08	Simangambat	917.26	46,769	41,167	44,132	Langkimat	21	22747
12.20.12	Ujung Batu	151.98	^{(d)}	11,764	12,830	Ujung Batu Jae	13	22746
12.20.03	Halongonan	332.41	29,058	20,891	22,846	Hutaimbaru	33	22753
12.20.11	Halongonan Timur (East Halongonan)	291.46	^{(e)}	22,532	25,869	Siancimun	14	22752
12.20.02	Dolok	367.37	22,573	24,755	26,299	Pasar Sipiongot	86	22756
12.20.01	Dolok Sigompulon	360.11	15,610	16,192	16,582	Pasar Simundol	44	22757
12.20.09	Hulu Sihapas	72.24	4,683	4,941	5,147	Aek Godang	10	22740
	Totals	3,945.56	223,531	260,720	285,659	Pasar Gunung Tua	388	

Notes: (a) including the kelurahan of Pasar Matanggor (Matanggor Market) with 1,413 inhabitants in mid 2023.
(b) including the kelurahan of Pasar Gunung Tua (Gunung Tua Market), with 14,460 inhabitants in mid 2023.
(c) The 2010 population of Padang Bolak Tenggara District is included in the figure for Padang Bolak District, from which it was split.
(d) The 2010 population of Ujung Batu District is included in the figure for Simangambat District, from which it was split.
(e) The 2010 population of Halongonan Timur District is included in the figure for Halongonan District, from which it was split.

== Archaeology ==
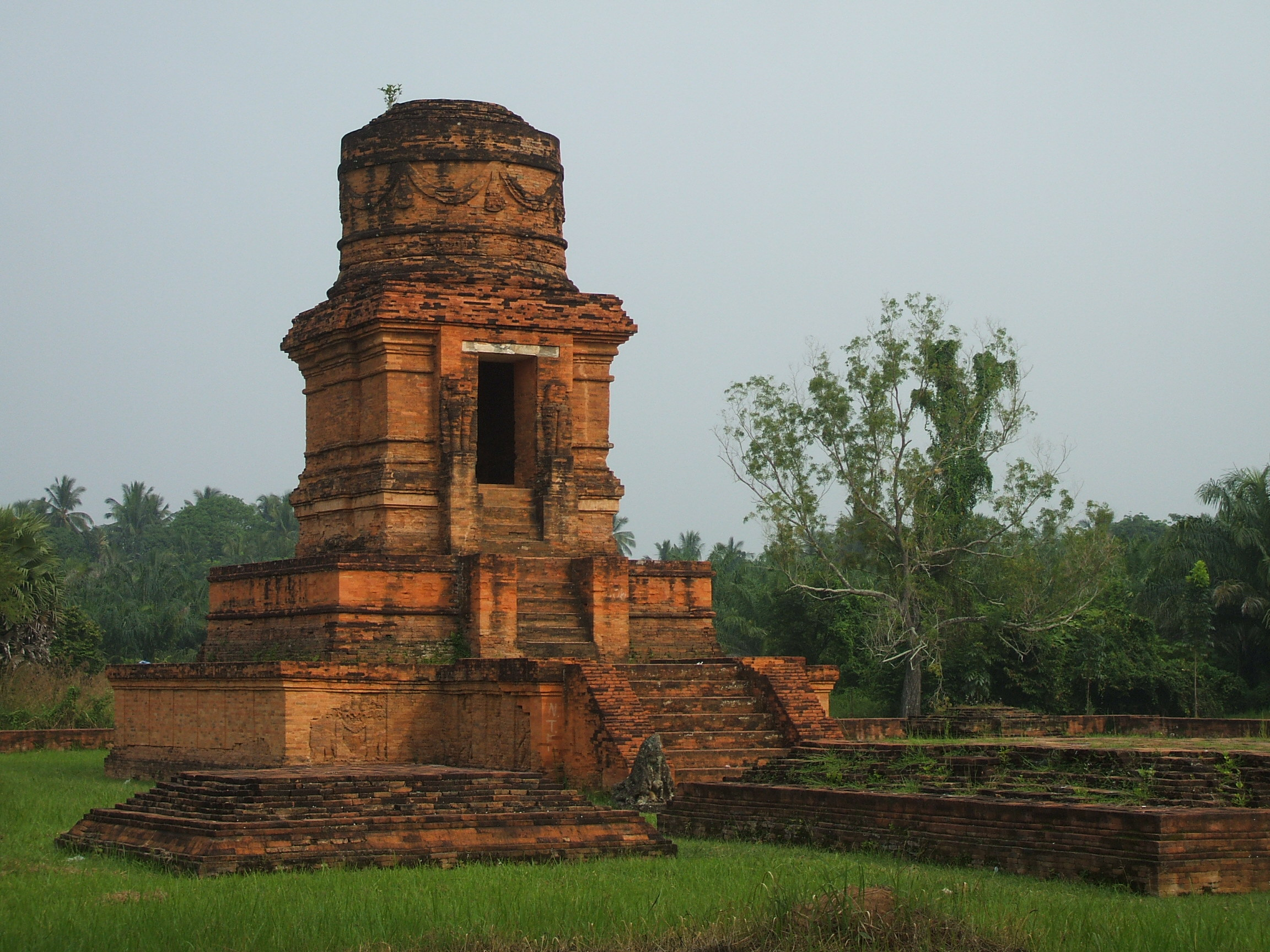
Bahal I temple at Bahal, Portibi district, North Padang Lawas

The Padang Lawas archaeological site is partly located in the regency. The site covers approximately 1,500 km^{2}, encompassing the kecamatan (districts) of Portibi and Padang Bolak in this regency, and Barumun and Barumun Tengah in the Padang Lawas Regency. Hindu-Buddhist remains are found on the site, including structures called biaro (from Sanskrit vihara, meaning "temple" or "monastery").

The village of Batu Gana in Padang Bolak Julu district is the location of a burial site consisting of a megalithic structure.

In the village of Padang Bujur in the same district, one can also find megalithic remains and what seems to be the base for a padmasana.

Other megalithic remains are found at Aek Korsik and Aek Tolong Huta, also in the Padang Bolak district.
