= Padang Lawas archaeological site =

Archaeological site in Sumatra

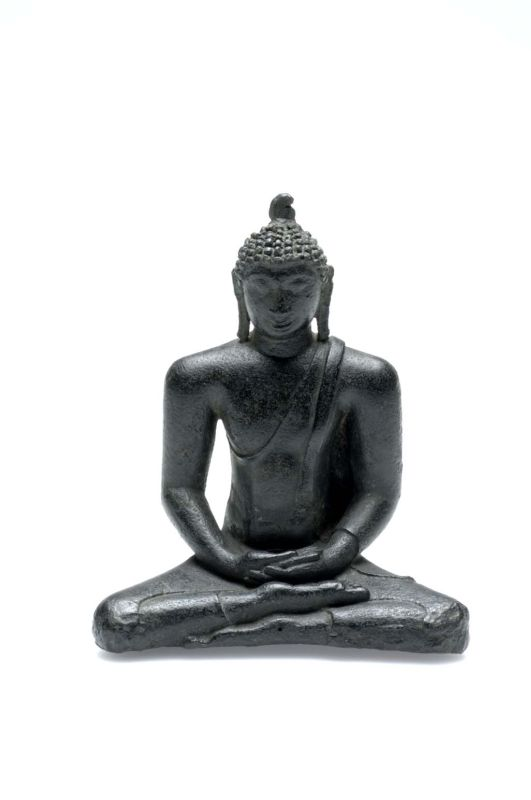
Buddha bronze statue found at Si Pamatung in Barumun Tengah district

Padang Lawas is an archaeological site in Indonesia in Padang Lawas Regency and North Padang Lawas Regency in North Sumatra.

== Description ==
The site features the remains of a Hindu-Buddhist temple complex. The most well-preserved temple is the Bahal temple complex. Most of the other temples on the site are in ruins.

== Status ==
There are no effective controls over the management of the remains of the numerous temples at the site. In 2011, a research worker from Medan State University expressed the view that up to half of the 16 temples in the area were at risk of being illegally excavated and noted that groups of thieves had been observed working at some of the temples.
