= Padang Lawas Regency =

Regency in North Sumatra, Indonesia

Coordinates: 1.126026°N 99.813309°E

Padang Lawas Regency Kabupaten Padang Lawas
- Regency
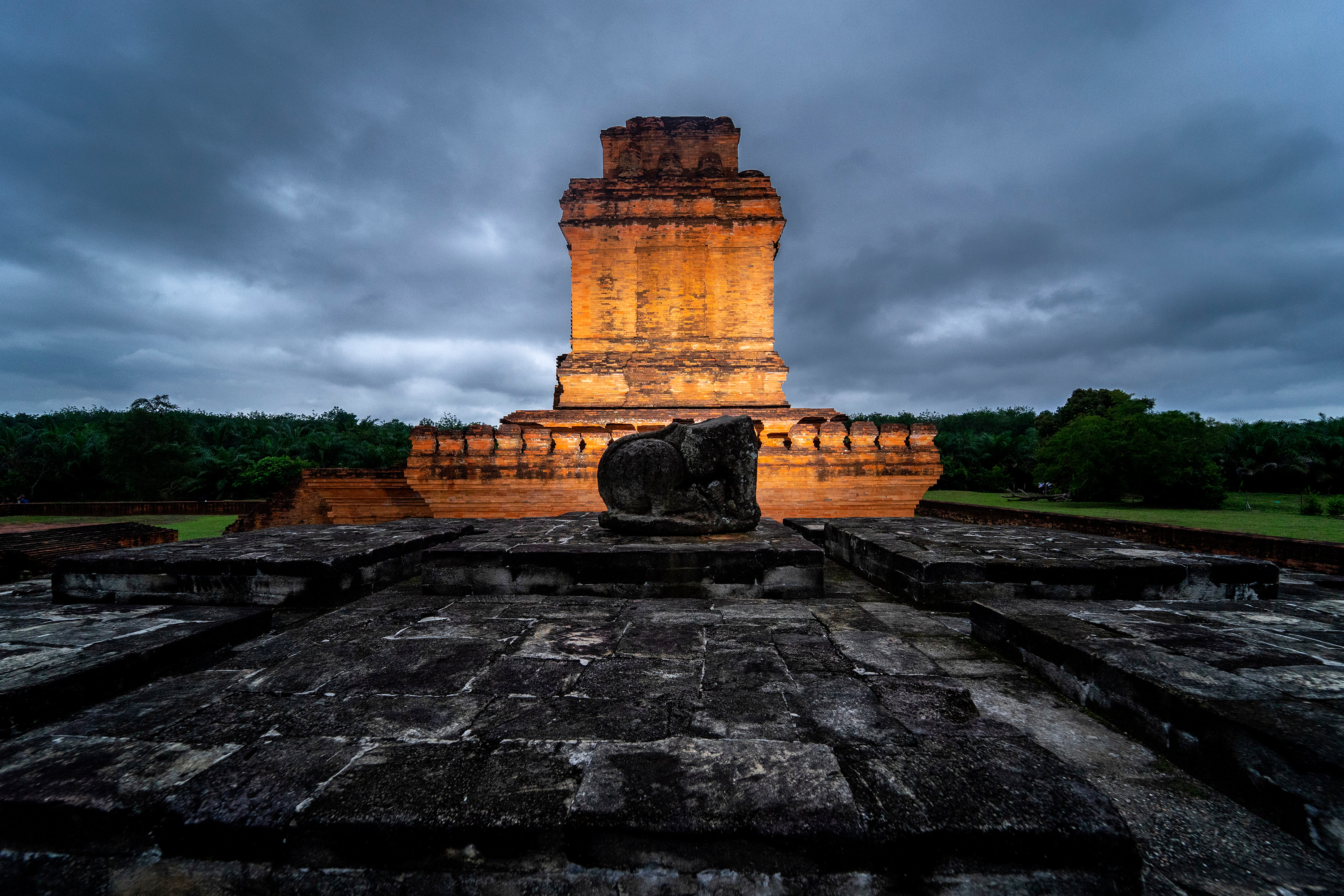
- Sipamutung temple in Barumun

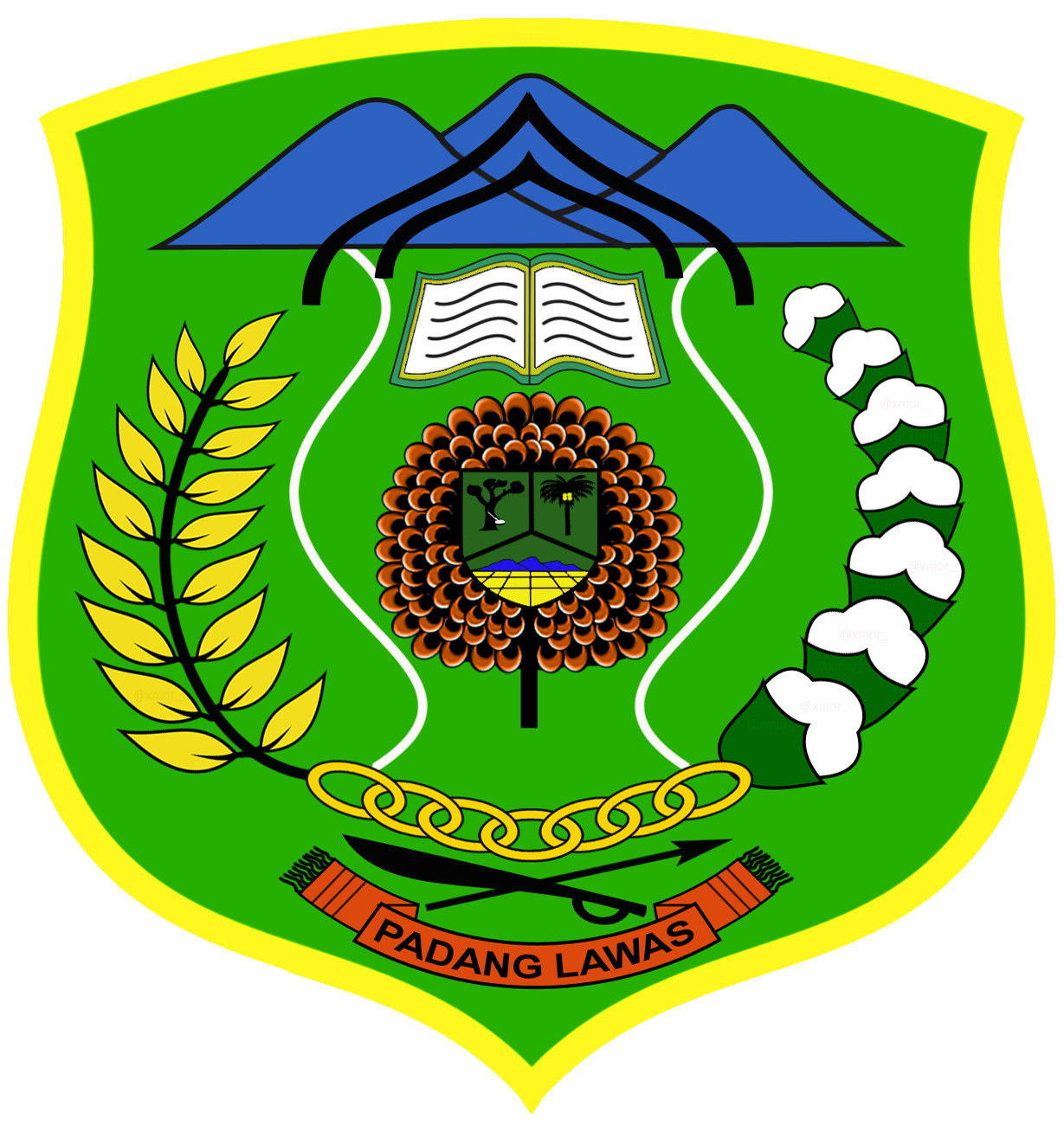
- Coat of arms
- Motto: BERCAHAYA (Beriman, Cerdas, Sehat, Sejahtera, Berbudaya)
- Country: Indonesia
- Province: North Sumatra
- Regency seat: Sibuhuan

Government
  - Regent: Putra Mahkota Alam Hasibuan
  - Vice Regent: Achmad Fauzan Nasution
  - Chairman of Council of Representatives: Amran Pikal Siregar (Golkar)
  - Vice Chairmen of Council of Representatives: Irsan Bangun Harahap (People's Conscience Party) and Sahrun Hasibuan (National Mandate Party)

Area
  - Total: 3,912.18 km^{2} (1,510.50 sq mi)

Population (mid 2025 estimate)
  - Total: 285,704
  - Density: 73.0294/km^{2} (189.145/sq mi)
- Time zone: UTC+7 (WIB)
- Website: padanglawaskab.go.id

Padang Lawas is a regency in the North Sumatra province of Indonesia. It covers an area of 3,912.18 km^{2}, and had a population of 226,807 at the 2010 Census and 261,011 at the 2020 Census; the official estimate as of mid 2025 was 285,704 (comprising 143,305 males and 142,399 females). Its administrative seat is the town of Sibuhuan in Barumun District. Padang Lawas Regency was created on 17 July 2007 (along with a separate North Padang Lawas Regency) from southeastern parts of the South Tapanuli Regency. It is the only regency in this province that borders two other provinces, West Sumatra and Riau.

== Administrative districts ==
At the 2010 Census, the regency was divided into nine districts (kecamatan). Subsequently, three additional districts were created by the division of existing districts (Barumun Selatan created from part of Barumun District; Aek Nabara Barumun, and Sihapas Barumun from parts of Barumun Tengah). In 2019 a further five districts were created, although the populations of these areas at the 2010 Census are still included in the districts from which they were cut. The districts are tabulated below with their areas and their populations at the 2010 Census and the 2020 Census, together with the official estimates as of mid 2025. The table also includes the locations of the district administrative centres, the number of administrative villages in each district (totaling 303 rural desa and a single urban kelurahan), and its postcode.

Kode Wilayah	Name of District (kecamatan)	Area in km^{2}	Pop'n Census 2010	Pop'n Census 2020	Pop'n Estimate mid 2025	Admin centre	No. of villages	Post code
12.21.01	Sosopan	435.18	9,186	10,389	11,207	Sosopan	12	22761
12.21.06	Ulu Barumun	207.43	14,024	16,700	18,471	Paringgonan	15	22767
12.21.07	Barumun	126.10	44,040	40,934	45,580	Pasar Sibuhuan	17 ^{(a)}	22763
12.21.13	Barumun Baru	13.73	^{(b)}	12,266	13,668	Hasahatan Julu	13	22763
12.21.10	Barumun Selatan (South Barumun)	109.87	6,780	7,954	8,734	Batang Bulu Lama	11	22764
12.21.04	Lubuk Barumun	289.58	16,201	20,024	22,550	Pasar Latong	24	22766
12.21.08	Sosa	283.52	31,765	19,487	22,183	Pasar Ujung Batu	16	22765
12.21.14	Ulu Sosa	211.67	^{(c)}	9,076	9,736	Hapung	11	22765
12.21.15	Sosa Julu	155.95	^{(c)}	10,295	11,663	Hurung Jilok	12	22765
12.21.09	Batang Lubu Sutam	184.75	11,990	8,113	8,530	Pinarik	20	22742
12.21.05	Huta Raja Tinggi	663.24	39,575	39,252	42,046	Huta Raja Tinggi	26	22776
12.21.17	Sosa Timur (East Sosa)	159.55	^{(d)}	8,623	8,907	Tanjung Ale	13	22742 & 22776
12.21.03	Huristak	523.59	19,794	18,652	19,366	Pasar Huristak	27	22743
12.21.02	Barumun Tengah (Central Barumun)	119.40	18,153	16,307	17,275	Padang Hasior	21	22755
12.21.11	Aek Nabara Barumun	329.36	10,725	13,107	14,679	Aek Nabara	25	22755
12.21.12	Sihapas Barumun	48.25	4,574	5,685	6,418	Padang Hasior	13	22755
12.21.16	Barumun Barat (West Barumun)	51.01	^{(e)}	4,147	4,791	Aek Nabara	10	22755
	Totals	3,912.18	226,807	261,011	285,704	Pasar Sibuhuan	304	

Notes: (a) including Pasar Sibuhuan (Sibuhuan Market), the sole town (kelurahan) in the regency, with 22,525 inhabitants (half of the Barumun District total) as at mid 2024.
(b) the 2010 Census population of the new Barumun Baru District is included in the figure for the Barumun District, from which it was cut out in 2019.
(c) the 2010 Census populations of the new Sosa Julu and Ulu Sosa Districts are included in the figure for the Sosa District, from which they were cut out in 2019.
(d) the 2010 Census populations of the new Sosa Timur District are included in the figures for the Batang Lubu Sutam and Hutaraja Tinggi Districts, from which it was cut out in 2019.
(e) the 2010 Census populations of the new Barumun Barut District are included in the figure for the Barumun Tengah District, from which it was cut out in 2019.

== Archaeology ==
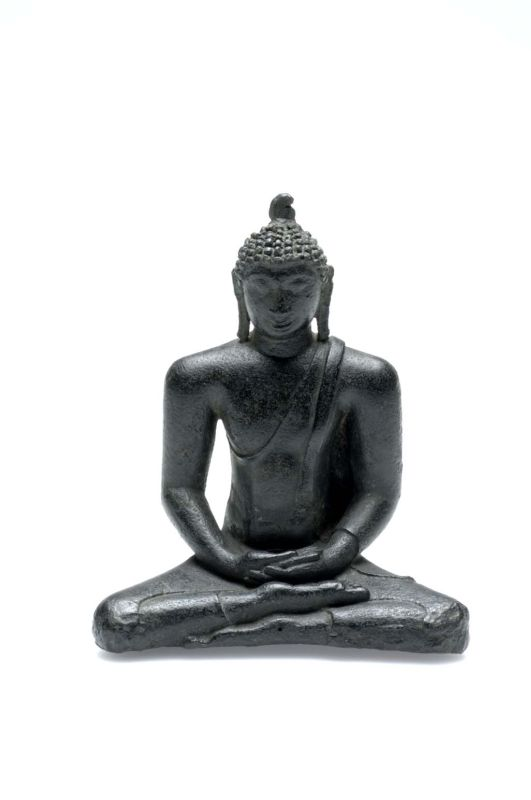
Buddha bronze statue found at Si Pamatung in Barumun Tengah district

The Padang Lawas archaeological site is partly located in the regency. Covering approximately 1,500 km² it spreads over the districts of Barumun and Barumun Tengah, and into South Tapanuli and North Padang Lawas regencies.
