= South Tapanuli Regency =

Regency in North Sumatra, Indonesia

South Tapanuli Regency Kabupaten Tapanuli Selatan
- Regency
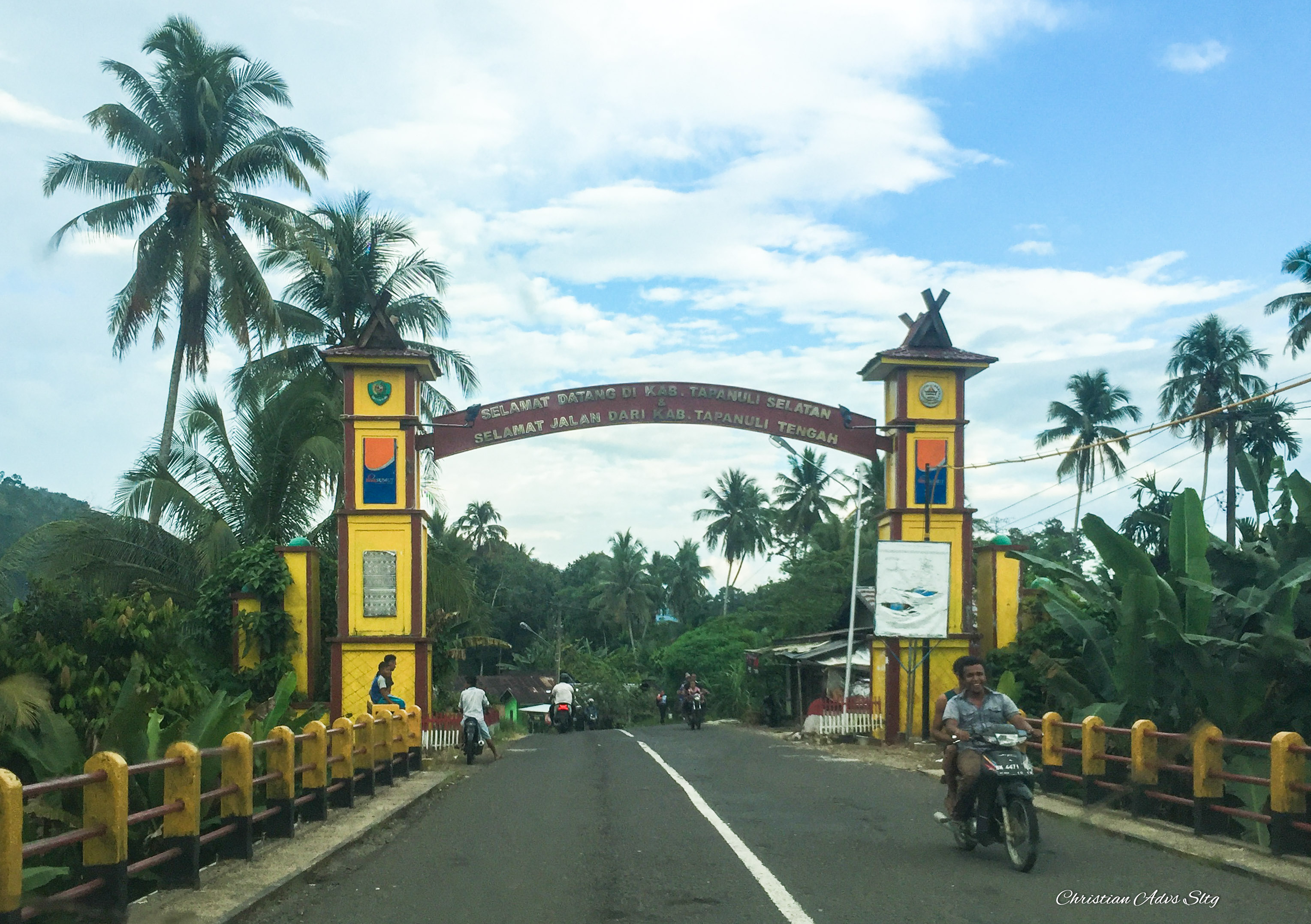
- Welcome gate to South Tapanuli Regency

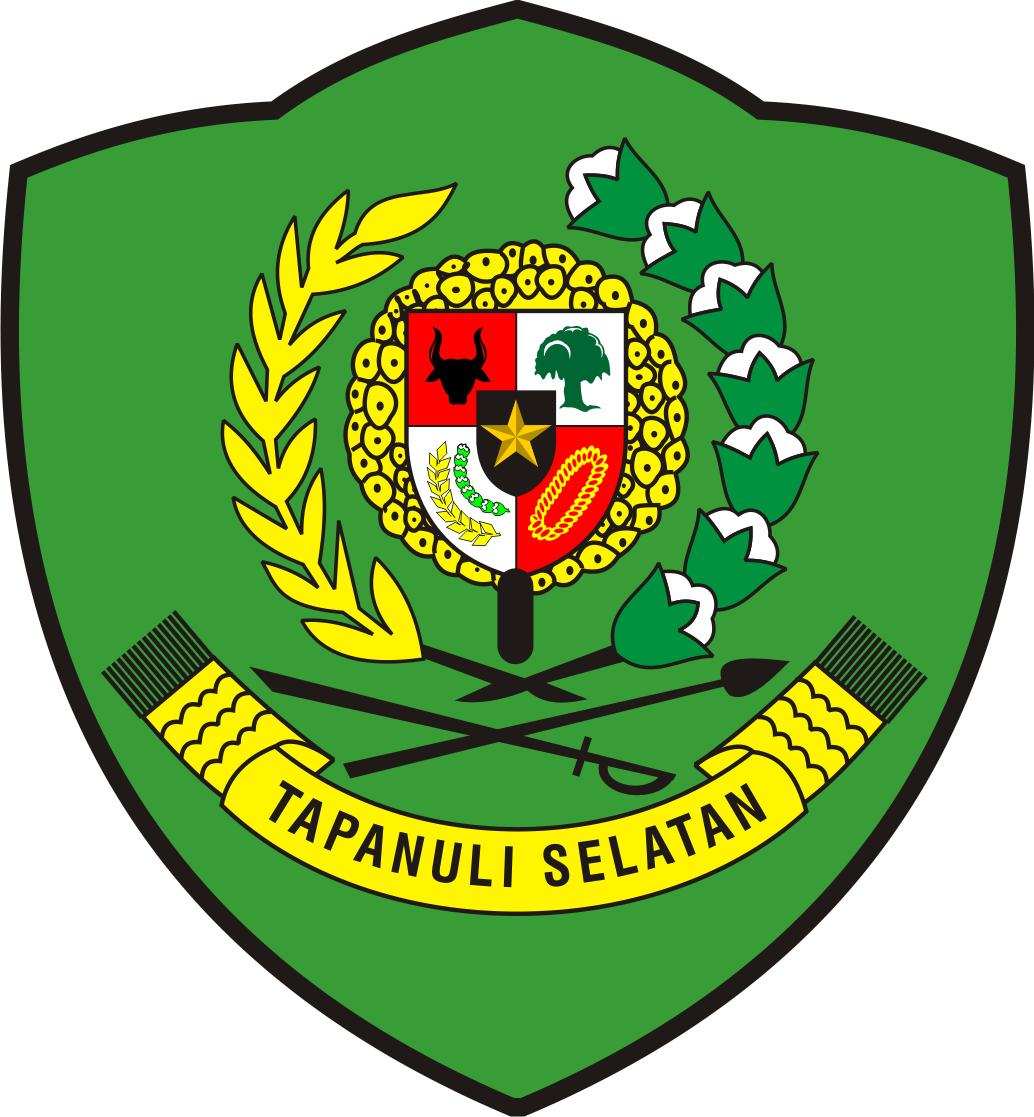
- Coat of arms

- Location of South Tapanuli in North Sumatra
- Country: Indonesia
- Province: North Sumatra
- Regency seat: Sipirok

Government
  - Regent: Gus Irawan Pasaribu
  - Vice Regent: Jafar Syahbuddin Ritonga
  - Chairman of Regency's Council of Representatives: Husin Sogot Simatupang (Gerindra)
  - Vice Chairmen of Regency's Council of Representatives: Rahmad Nasution (Golkar) and Borkat (National Mandate Party)

Area
  - Total: 4,355.35 km^{2} (1,681.61 sq mi)

Population (mid 2025 estimate)
  - Total: 328,964
  - Density: 75.5310/km^{2} (195.624/sq mi)
- Time zone: UTC+7 (WIB)
- Website: www.tapselkab.go.id

South Tapanuli (Tapanuli Selatan in Indonesian Language, abbreviated Tapsel) is a regency in North Sumatra, Indonesia. Its seat is the town of Sipirok. This regency was originally very large and contained hundreds of towns and villages, including the city of Padang Sidempuan. The areas that have separated from South Tapanuli Regency are the new regencies of Mandailing Natal (created on 23 November 1998), Padang Lawas Utara, and Padang Lawas (both created on 17 July 2007), all lying to the south-east of the residual South Tapanuli Regency, plus the city (kota) of Padang Sidempuan (created on 21 June 2001). After the division, the regency seat moved from Padang Sidempuan to Sipirok.

The regency covers an area of 4,355.35 square kilometres and had a population of 264,108 at the 2010 census and 300,911 at the 2020 Census; the official estimate as of mid 2025 was 328,964 (comprising 165,512 males and 163,452 females). These figures exclude the city of Padang Sidempuan, which is virtually surrounded by South Tananuli territory but is independently administered.

There are several attractions in the regency, including Lake Marsabut and Lake Siais. The language used by the people is the Angkola Batak language. The majority religion of the population is Islam. An airport is located at Aek Godang in Hulu Sihapas District, North Padang Lawas Regency.

== Administration ==
At the 2010 Census, the regency was divided into twelve districts (kecamatan). Subsequently, three additional districts (Tano Tombangan Angkola, Angkola Muara Tais, and Angkola Sangkunur) have been created by the division of existing districts. The districts are tabulated below with their areas and their populations at the 2010 Census and 2020 Census, together with the official estimates as of mid 2025. The table also includes the locations of the district administrative centres, the number of administrative villages in each district (totaling 211 rural desa and 37 urban kelurahan), and its postcode.

Kode Wilayah	Name of District (kecamatan)	Area in km^{2}	Pop'n Census 2010	Pop'n Census 2020	Pop'n Estimate mid 2025	Admin centre	No. of desa	No. of kelurahan	Post code
12.03.07	Batang Angkola	211.36	32,129	21,323	22,834	Pintu Padang	17	4 ^{(a)}	22773
12.03.21	Sayur Matinggi	295.11	37,655	26,014	27,991	Sayur Matinggi	18	1 ^{(b)}	22774
12.03.30	Tano Tombangan; Angkola	210.30	^{(c)}	15,993	16,472	Situmba	16	1 ^{(d)}	22775
12.03.32	Angkola Muara Tais	149.70	^{(e)}	13,766	15,164	Muara Tais	13	2 ^{(f)}	22733
12.03.03	Angkola Timur (East Angkola)	235.16	18,553	21,294	24,341	Pargarutan	13	2 ^{(g)}	22733
12.03.06	Angkola Selatan (South Angkola)	496.57	27,500	32,757	34,403	Simarpinggan	13	4 ^{(h)}	22732
12.03.01	Angkola Barat (West Angkola)	104.52	41,254	25,206	26,845	Sitinjak	12	2 ^{(j)}	22735
12.03.31	Angkola Sangkunur	254.77	^{(k)}	21,740	23,869	Simataniari	8	2 ^{(m)}	22734
12.03.02	Batang Toru	380.04	28,595	33,760	38,037	Batang Toru	19	4 ^{(n)}	22738
12.03.20	Marancar	89.11	9,351	10,359	11,419	Pasar Sempurna	11	1 ^{(b)}	22737
12.03.29	Muara Batang Toru	308.01	11,401	15,806	18,766	Huta Raja	6	3 ^{(p)}	22736
12.03.04	Sipirok	409.37	30,435	33,326	36,916	Sipirok	34	6 ^{(q)}	22739
12.03.14	Arse	265.90	7,872	8,677	9,211	Arse Nauli	8	2 ^{(r)}	22748
12.03.05	Saipar Dolok Hole	540.57	12,674	13,940	15,167	Sipagimbar	12	2 ^{(s)}	22759
12.03.22	Aek Bilah	404.85	6,396	7,395	7,529	Biru	12	-	22758
	Totals	4,355.35	263,815	300,911	328,964	Sipirok	211	37	

Notes: (a) comprising Bangun Purba, Pintu Padang Raya I, Pintu Padang Raya II and Sigalangan. (b) the district administrative centre, as named.
(c) the 2010 population of the new Tano Tombangan Angkola District is included in the figure for Sayur Matinggi District, from which it was split off. (d) Batu Horpak kelurahan.
(e) the 2010 population of the new Angkola Muara Tais District is included in the figure for Batang Angkola District, from which it was split off. (f) comprising Huta Tomga and Bintuju.
(g) comprising Batang Tura Sirumambe and Pasar Pargarutan. (h) comprising Napa, Pardomuan, Simarpinggan and Tapian Nauli. (j) comprising Sitinjak and Simatorkis Sisoma.
(k) the 2010 population of the new Angkola Sangkunur District is included in the figure for the Angkola Barat District, from which it was split off. (m) comprising Sangkunur and Rianiate.
(n) comprising Aek Pining, Perkebunan Batang Toru, Wek I and Wek II. (p) comprising Huta Raja, Muara Ampolu and Muara Manompas.
(q) comprising Baringin, Bunga Bondar, Huta Suhut, Parau Sorat, Pasar Sipirok and Sipirok Godang. (r) comprising Arse Nauli and Lancat. (s) comprising Sipaginbar and Aek Simotung.

== Geography ==
=== Location ===
To the north, the district is bordered by the Central Tapanuli Regency and North Tapanuli Regency. The regency borders the Padang Lawas Regency in the east, and to the north, the west, and the south it borders the Mandailing Natal Regency. In the middle of the South Tananuli Regency is Padang Sidimpuan City, which is surrounded by this Regency but separately administered.

== Sights ==
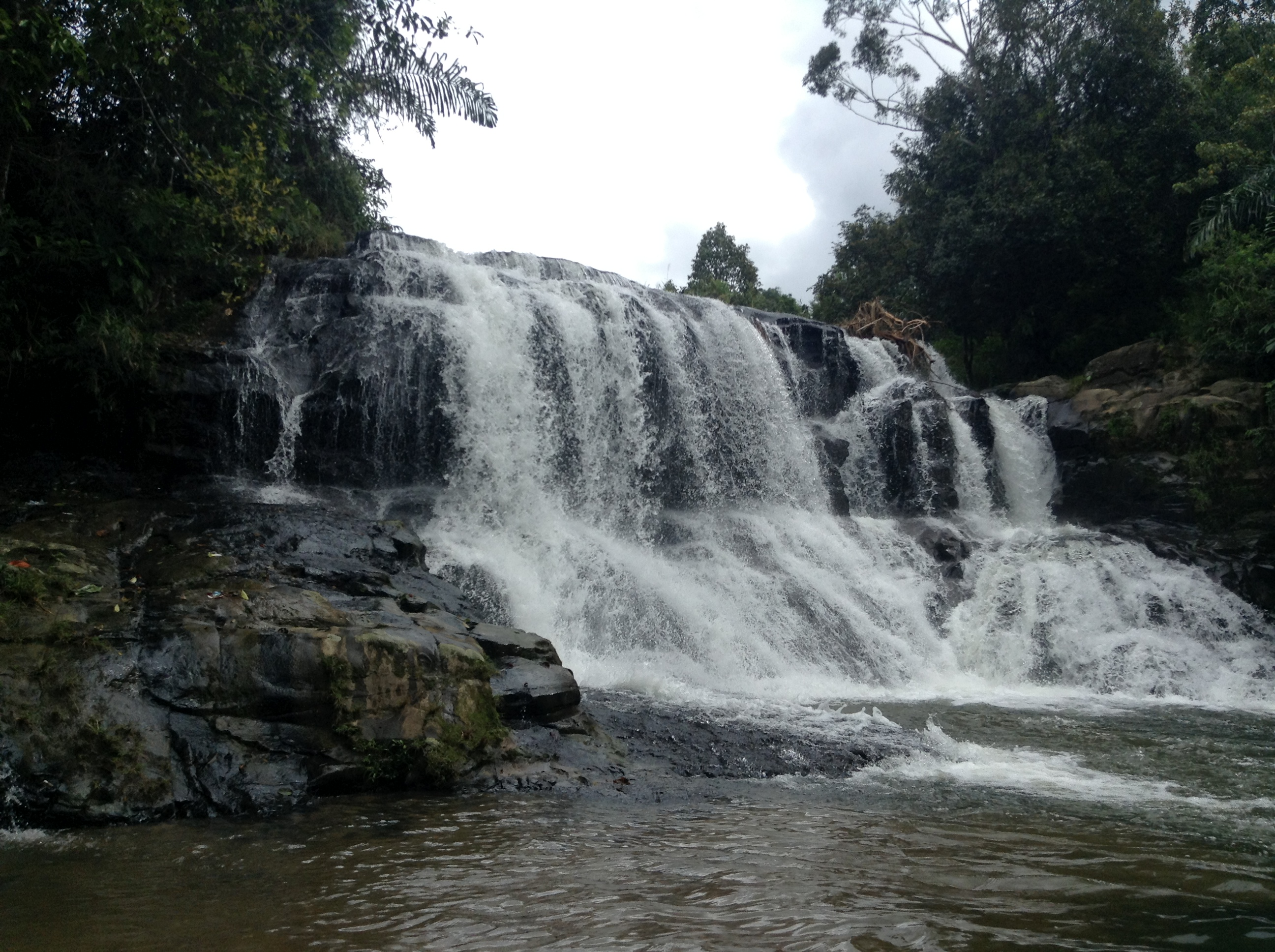
Sampuran waterfall in Damparan Hauntas, Saipar Dolok Hole, South Tapanuli Regency

Sights include a waterfall in Damparan Hauntas, in Saipar Dolok Hole District.

== Archaeology ==
The Padang Lawas archaeological site is partly located in the regency. The site covers approximately 1,500 km^{2} in this regency and in the Padang Lawas and North Padang Lawas regencies.

== Wildlife ==
The critically endangered Tapanuli orangutan lives in the region. It was described as a distinct species in 2017 and represents the first extant species of great ape to be described since the bonobo in 1929. Scientists have identified a new species of great ape, Pongo tapanuliensis or Tapanuli orangutan, but fear its survival is already in doubt as its habitat is under threat.

== Sources ==
- Simanjuntak, Truman, M. Hisyam, Bagyo Prasetyo, Titi Surti Nastiti (éds.), Archaeology: Indonesian perspective : R.P. Soejono's festschrift, LIPI, Jakarta, 2006, ISBN 979-26-2499-6
