= Barumun River =

Coordinates: 2.5°N 100.15°E

Barumun Sungai Barumun, Aek Baroemoen
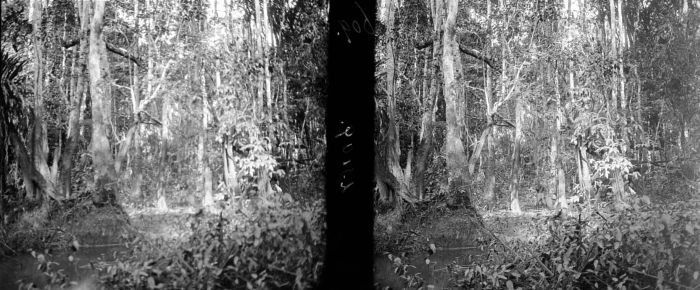

- Location of river mouth Barumun River (Indonesia)

Location
- Country: Indonesia

Physical characteristics
- Source
  - location: Siraisan, Padang Lawas, North Sumatra
  - elevation: 1,500 m (4,900 ft)
- Mouth
  - location: Malacca Strait
  - elevation: 0 m (0 ft)
- Length: 440 km (270 mi)
- Basin size: 13,383.86 km^{2} (5,167.54 mi^{2})
- Discharge
  - location: Near mouth
  - average: (Period: 2003–2015)544.1 m^{3}/s (19,210 cu ft/s) (Period: 2006–2010)824.45 m^{3}/s (29,115 cu ft/s)

Basin features
- River system: Barumun River

Barumun River is a Sumatran river that begins in Siraisan, Padang Lawas Regency in the southeastern North Sumatra, Indonesia, about 1,200 km northwest of the capital Jakarta.

== Hydrology ==
The river flows northward through North Padang Lawas, South and Labuhan Batu Regency before reaching Sumatra's east coast with its estuary in Malacca Strait.

The largest town on the Barumun is Kotapinang, the administrative capital of South Labuhan Batu Regency, with a population of 70,507 people in mid 2024, while the largest town in the Barumun River basin is Rantau Prapat (in Labuhan Batu Regency), which is located on the Bilah tributary with a population of 180,540 according to the official estimates as at mid 2024. It is the largest river in Sumatra with a length of about 440 km.

Tributaries include the Bilah, Kanan, Batang Pane, Sihapas and Aek Sangkilon. All tributaries of Barumun River are sourced from mountainous areas along Barisan Mountains.

== Geography ==
The river flows in the northern area of Sumatra with predominantly tropical rainforest climate (designated as Af in the Köppen-Geiger climate classification). The annual average temperature in the area is 23 °C. The warmest month is May, when the average temperature is around 25 °C, and the coldest is January, at 22 °C. The average annual rainfall is 2801 mm. The wettest month is November, with an average of 381 mm rainfall, and the driest is March, with 126 mm rainfall.

== See also ==
- List of drainage basins of Indonesia
- List of rivers of Indonesia
- List of rivers of Sumatra
