= Daya Labuhan Indah =

Indonesian palm oil company

PT Daya Labuhan Indah (DLI) is a company active in the palm oil business from Bilah Hilir, Labuhan Batu Regency, North Sumatra, Indonesia. It is a grower of palm fruits and has a mill and two estates in North Sumatra. Wilmar owns 95% of PT Daya Labuhan Indah. There was evidence of hazardous work of children working on plantations of Daya Labuhan Indah and of failure to pay workers a daily minimum wage if they do not meet targets set by the company or if it rains at a certain time of day. According to the company, there is no child/underage labor and targets are based on calibration. It also says there is no forced labor. PT Daya Labuhan Indah is certified by the Roundtable on Sustainable Palm Oil (RSPO).
