= Siborongborong =

Coordinates: 2°12′47″N 98°58′9″E

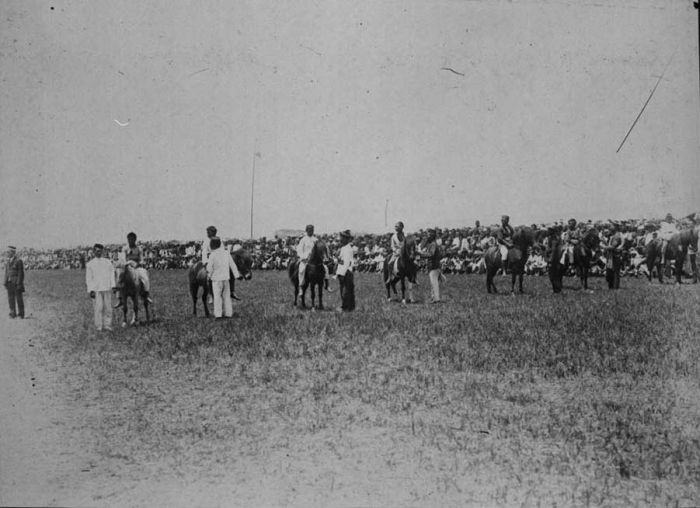
Start of a horse race at Siborong-Borong in 1917

Siborongborong is a district (kecamatan) in the North Tapanuli regency, North Sumatra province, Sumatra, Indonesia.

== Transportation ==
Siborong-Borong has an airport, Silangit Airport.
