= Rantau Prapat =

Coordinates: 2°20′N 100°03′E

Rantauprapat
- Town

Other transcription(s)
  - Chinese: 兰陶帕拉帕
  - Jawi: رنتاو ڤاراڤات
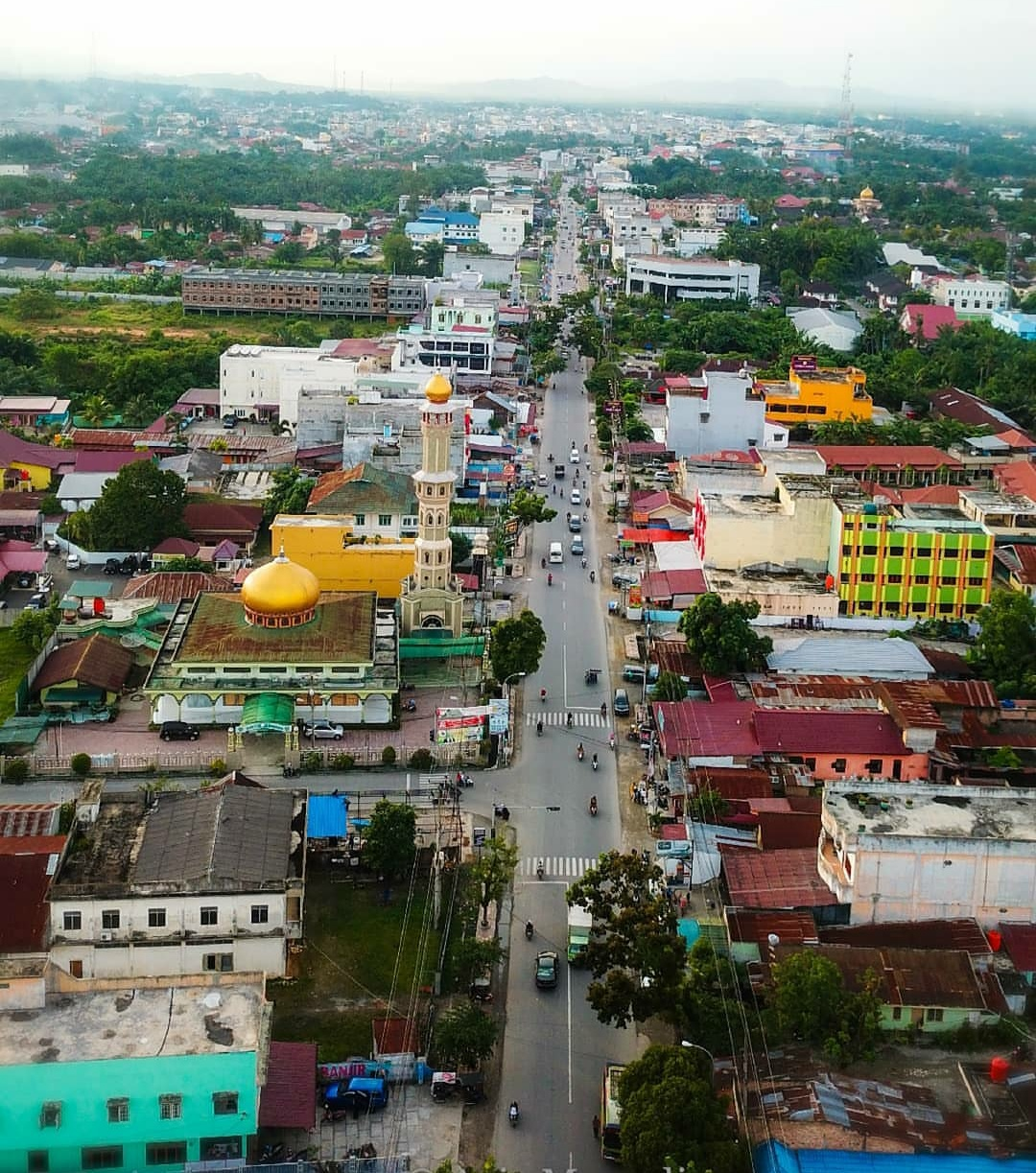
- Rantauprapat town, 2018
- Interactive map of Rantauprapat
- Country: Indonesia
- Province: North Sumatra

Population (mid 2025 estimate)
  - Total: 183,094
- Time zone: UTC+7 (WIB)

Rantauprapat is a large town (formerly a city) in North Sumatra province of Indonesia and it is the seat (capital) of Labuhan Batu Regency. Rantauprapat is also a name of a village within the district of Rantau Utara (North Rantau). It consists of 3 main roads. A number of citizens have moved to larger centres like Medan in search of more job opportunities and/or universities. A large river named the Bilah River (a tributary of the Barumun River) runs through the town, which had 140,778 inhabitants at the 2010 Census, 170,462 at the 2020 Census, and 183,094 according to the official estimates as at mid 2025.

== Administration ==
Rantauprapat was formerly an independent city situated within but administratively separate from Labuhan Batu Regency, but in 2003 its status of administrative city was erased as it did not fulfill the requirements for that status, and it was merged into the Regency, within which it now comprises two districts (North Rantau and South Rantau). These two districts (kecamatan) are tabulated below with their areas and their populations at the 2010 Census and 2020 Census, and the mid 2024 official estimates.

Name	Area in km^{2}	Population Census 2010	Population Census 2020	Population estimate mid 2025
Rantau Selatan (South Rantauprapat)	60.20	57,948	73,977	80,949
Rantau Utara (North Rantauprapat)	91.24	82,830	96,485	102,145

== Climate ==
Rantauprapat has a tropical rainforest climate (Af) with heavy to very heavy rainfall year-round.

Climate data for Rantauprapat
Month	Jan	Feb	Mar	Apr	May	Jun	Jul	Aug	Sep	Oct	Nov	Dec	Year
Mean daily maximum °C (°F)	30.9 (87.6)	31.2 (88.2)	31.5 (88.7)	31.3 (88.3)	31.4 (88.5)	31.2 (88.2)	31.0 (87.8)	30.7 (87.3)	30.5 (86.9)	30.3 (86.5)	30.2 (86.4)	30.3 (86.5)	30.9 (87.6)
Daily mean °C (°F)	25.8 (78.4)	26.0 (78.8)	26.4 (79.5)	26.4 (79.5)	26.5 (79.7)	26.3 (79.3)	26.0 (78.8)	25.9 (78.6)	25.9 (78.6)	25.8 (78.4)	25.7 (78.3)	25.7 (78.3)	26.0 (78.9)
Mean daily minimum °C (°F)	20.8 (69.4)	20.8 (69.4)	21.3 (70.3)	21.6 (70.9)	21.7 (71.1)	21.4 (70.5)	21.1 (70.0)	21.1 (70.0)	21.3 (70.3)	21.4 (70.5)	21.3 (70.3)	21.1 (70.0)	21.2 (70.2)
Average rainfall mm (inches)	246 (9.7)	157 (6.2)	195 (7.7)	194 (7.6)	191 (7.5)	159 (6.3)	142 (5.6)	185 (7.3)	262 (10.3)	291 (11.5)	274 (10.8)	271 (10.7)	2,567 (101.2)
Source: Climate-Data.org

== Urban villages ==
The two districts are sub-divided into 19 urban villages (kelurahan), listed below with their populations as at mid 2023.

Name	Area in km^{2}	Population estimate mid 2024
Lobusona	22.83	1,943
Sidorejo	1.00	5,281
Sigambal	3.51	7,215
Danau Bale	6.93	6,587
Pardamean	2.53	10,809
Ujung Bandar	2.82	6,215
Bakaran Batu	6.18	16,664
Urung Kompas	11.42	11,959
Sioldengan	2.98	11,770
Totals for South Rantau	60.20	78,443

Name	Area in km^{2}	Population estimate mid 2024
Sirandorung	9.67	14,744
Padang Bulan	2.39	16,692
Kartini	0.96	5,424
Rantauprapat	0.70	5,800
Cerdana	0.42	6,818
Binaraga	0.50	7,081
Siringo-Ringo	9.59	8,525
Aek Paing	3.60	8,942
Padang Matinggi	4.35	14,183
Pulo Padang ^{(a)}	59.06	10,016
Totals for North Rantau	91.24	98,225

Note: (a) Pulo Padang forms the northern 65% of the area of Rantauu Utara District.
