= List of districts of North Sumatra =

The province of North Sumatra in Indonesia is divided into regencies which in turn are divided administratively into districts (Indonesian: Kecamatan).

The districts of North Sumatra with the regency it falls into are as follows:

- Adiankoting, Tapanuli Utara
- Adman Dewi, Tapanuli Tengah
- Aek Bilah, Tapanuli Selatan
- Aek Kuasan, Asahan
- Aek Kuo, Labuhanbatu Utara
- Aek Ledong, Asahan
- Aek Natas, Labuhanbatu Utara
- Aek Songsongan, Asahan
- Afulu, Nias Utara
- Air Batu, Asahan
- Air Joman, Asahan
- Air Putih, Batubara
- Ajibata, Toba Samosir
- Alasa Talumuzoi, Nias Utara
- Alasa, Nias Utara
- Amandraya, Nias Selatan
- Arse, Tapanuli Selatan
- Babalan, Langkat
- Badiri, Tapanuli Tengah
- Bahorok, Langkat
- Baktiraja, Humbang Hasundutan
- Balige, Toba Samosir
- Bandar Huluan, Simalungun
- Bandar Khalipah, Serdang Bedagai
- Bandar Masilam, Simalungun
- Bandar Pasir Mandoge, Asahan
- Bandar Pulau, Asahan
- Bandar, Simalungun
- Bangun Purba, Deli Serdang
- Barumun Tengah, Padang Lawas
- Barumun, Padang Lawas
- Barus, Tapanuli Tengah
- Barusjahe, Karo
- Batahan, Mandailing Natal
- Batang Bulu Sutam, Padang Lawas
- Batang Kuis, Deli Serdang
- Batang Lubu Sutam, Padang Lawas
- Batang Natal, Mandailing Natal
- Batang Onang, Tapanuli Selatan
- Batang Serangan, Langkat
- Batang Toru, Tapanuli Selatan
- Bawolato, Nias
- Berampu, Dairi
- Beringin, Deli Serdang
- Besitang, Langkat
- Bilah Barat, Labuhan Batu
- Bilah Hilir, Labuhan Batu
- Bilah Hulu, Labuhan Batu
- Binjai, Langkat
- Biru-Biru, Deli Serdang
- Bor Bor, Toba Samosir
- Bosar Maligas, Simalungun
- Brandan Barat, Langkat
- Bukit Malintang, Mandailing Natal
- Buntu Pane, Asahan
- Datuk Bandar, Tanjung Balai
- Deli Tua, Deli Serdang
- Dolat Rakyat, Karo
- Dolok Batunanggar, Simalungun
- Dolok Masihul, Serdang Bedagai
- Dolok Merawan, Serdang Bedagai
- Dolok Panribuan, Simalungun
- Dolok Pardamean, Simalungun
- Dolok Sanggul, Humbang Hasundutan
- Dolok Sigompulon, Tapanuli Selatan
- Dolok Silau, Simalungun
- Dolok, Tapanuli Selatan
- Galang, Deli Serdang
- Garoga, Tapanuli Utara
- Gebang, Langkat
- Gido, Nias
- Girsang Sipangan Bolon, Simalungun
- Gomo, Nias Selatan
- Gunung Malela, Simalungun
- Gunung Maligas, Simalungun
- Gunung Meriah, Deli Serdang
- Gunung Sitember, Dairi
- Gunung Sitoli Alo'oa, Gunung Sitoli
- Gunung Sitoli Barat, Gunung Sitoli
- Gunung Sitoli Idanoi, Gunung Sitoli
- Gunung Sitoli Selatan, Gunung Sitoli
- Gunung Sitoli Utara, Gunung Sitoli
- Gunung Sitoli, Gunung Sitoli
- Gunung Tua, Padang Lawas Utara
- Habinsaran, Toba Samosir
- Halongonan, Tapanuli Selatan
- Haranggaol Horisan, Simalungun
- Harian, Samosir
- Hatonduhan, Simalungun
- Hibala, Nias Selatan
- Hili Serangkai, Nias
- Hiliduho, Nias
- Hinai, Langkat
- Huristak, Padang Lawas
- Huta Bargot, Mandailing Natal
- Huta Raja Tinggi, Padang Lawas
- Hutabayu Raja, Simalungun
- Idano Gawo, Nias
- Jawa Maraja Bah Jambi, Simalungun
- Jorlang Hataran, Simalungun
- Juhar, Karo
- Kabanjahe, Karo
- Kampung Rakyat, Labuhanbatu Selatan
- Kecamatan Sosopan
- Kerajaan, Pakpak Bharat
- Kisaran Barat, Asahan
- Kisaran Timur, Asahan
- Kolang, Tapanuli Tengah
- Kota Kisaran Barat, Asahan
- Kota Kisaran Timur, Asahan
- Kota Pinang, Labuhanbatu Selatan
- Kotanopan, Mandailing Natal
- Kotarih, Serdang Bedagai
- Kuala, Langkat
- Kualuh Hilir, Labuhanbatu Utara
- Kualuh Hulu, Labuhanbatu Utara
- Kualuh Leidong, Labuhanbatu Utara
- Kualuh Selatan, Labuhanbatu Utara
- Kuta Buluh, Karo
- Kutalimbaru, Deli Serdang
- Kutambaru, Langkat
- Labuhan Deli, Deli Serdang
- Lae Parira, Dairi
- Lagu Boti, Toba Samosir
- Lahewa Timur, Nias Utara
- Lahewa, Nias Utara
- Lahomi, Nias Barat
- Lahusa, Nias Selatan
- Laubaleng, Karo
- Lembah Sorik Merapi, Mandailing Natal
- Limapuluh, Batubara
- Lingga Bayu, Mandailing Natal
- Lintong Nihuta, Humbang Hasundutan
- Lolo Wa'u, Nias Selatan
- Lolofitu Moi, Nias Barat
- Lolomatua, Nias Selatan
- Lotu, Nias Utara
- Lubuk Barumun, Padang Lawas
- Lubuk Pakam, Deli Serdang
- Lumban Julu, Toba Samosir
- Lumut, Tapanuli Tengah
- Mandrehe Barat, Nias Barat
- Mandrehe Utara, Nias Barat
- Mandrehe, Nias Barat
- Manduamas, Tapanuli Tengah
- Marancar, Tapanuli Selatan
- Marbau, Labuhanbatu Utara
- Mardingding, Karo
- Medang Deras, Batubara
- Meranti, Asahan
- Merdeka, Karo
- Merek, Karo
- Moro'o, Nias Barat
- Muara Batang Gadis, Mandailing Natal
- Muara Sipongi, Mandailing Natal
- Muara, Tapanuli Utara
- Munthe, Karo
- Na IX-X, Labuhanbatu Utara
- Naga Juang, Mandailing Natal
- Nainggolan, Samosir
- Naman Teran, Karo
- Namo Rambe, Deli Serdang
- Namohalu Esiwa, Nias Utara
- Natal, Mandailing Natal
- Onan Ganjang, Humbang Hasundutan
- Onan Runggu, Samosir
- Padang Bolak Julu, Tapanuli Selatan
- Padang Bolak, Tapanuli Selatan
- Padang Hilir, Tebing Tinggi
- Padang Hulu, Tebing Tinggi
- Padang Sidempuan Barat, Tapanuli Selatan
- Padang Sidempuan Batu Nadua, Padang Sidempuan
- Padang Sidempuan Hutaimbaru, Padang Sidempuan
- Padang Sidempuan Selatan, Padang Sidempuan
- Padang Sidempuan Tenggara, Padang Sidempuan
- Padang Sidempuan Timur, Tapanuli Selatan
- Padang Sidempuan Utara, Padang Sidempuan
- Padang Tualang, Langkat
- Pagar Marbau, Deli Serdang
- Pagaran, Tapanuli Utara
- Pagindar, Pakpak Bharat
- Pahae Jae, Tapanuli Utara
- Pahae Julu, Tapanuli Utara
- Pakantan, Mandailing Natal
- Palipi, Samosir
- Panai Hilir, Labuhan Batu
- Panai Hulu, Labuhan Batu
- Panai Tengah, Labuhan Batu
- Pancur Batu, Deli Serdang
- Pane, Simalungun
- Pangaribuan, Tapanuli Utara
- Pangkalan Susu, Langkat
- Pangkatan, Labuhan Batu
- Pangururan, Samosir
- Panombeian Pane, Simalungun
- Pantai Cermin, Serdang Bedagai
- Pantai Labu, Deli Serdang
- Panyabungan Barat, Mandailing Natal
- Panyabungan Kota, Mandailing Natal
- Panyabungan Selatan, Mandailing Natal
- Panyabungan Timur, Mandailing Natal
- Panyabungan Utara, Mandailing Natal
- Paranginan, Humbang Hasundutan
- Parbuluan, Dairi
- Parlilitan, Humbang Hasundutan
- Parmonangan, Tapanuli Utara
- Payung, Karo
- Pegagan Hilir, Dairi
- Pematang Bandar, Simalungun
- Pematang Jaya, Langkat
- Pematang Sidamanik, Simalungun
- Percut Sei Tuan, Deli Serdang
- Pergetteng-getteng Sengkut, Pakpak Bharat
- Petumbak, Deli Serdang
- Pintu Pohan Meranti, Toba Samosir
- Pollung, Humbang Hasundutan
- Porsea, Toba Samosir
- Portibi, Tapanuli Selatan
- Pulau Rakyat, Asahan
- Pulau-Pulau Batu, Nias Selatan
- Pulo Bandring, Asahan
- Puncak Sorik Merapi, Mandailing Natal
- Purba, Simalungun
- Purbatua, Tapanuli Utara
- Rahuning, Asahan
- Rambutan, Tebing Tinggi
- Rantau Selatan, Labuhan Batu
- Rantau Utara, Labuhan Batu
- Ranto Baek, Mandailing Natal
- Rawang Panca Arga, Asahan
- Raya Kahean, Simalungun
- Raya, Simalungun
- Ronggur Nihuta, Samosir
- S. Tualang Raso, Tanjung Balai
- Saipar Dolok Hole, Tapanuli Selatan
- Salak, Pakpak Bharat
- Salapian, Langkat
- Sawit Seberang, Langkat
- Sawo, Nias Utara
- Sayur Matinggi, Tapanuli Selatan
- Secanggang, Langkat
- Sei Balai, Batubara
- Sei Bingei, Langkat
- Sei Dadap, Asahan
- Sei Kanan, Labuhanbatu Selatan
- Sei Kepayang Barat, Asahan
- Sei Kepayang Timur, Asahan
- Sei Kepayang, Asahan
- Sei Lepan, Langkat
- Sei Rampah, Serdang Bedagai
- Sei Suka, Batubara
- Selesai, Langkat
- Setia Janji, Asahan
- Siabu, Mandailing Natal
- Siais, Tapanuli Selatan
- Sianjur Mula Mula, Samosir
- Siantar Barat, Pematangsiantar
- Siantar Marihat, Pematangsiantar
- Siantar Martoba, Pematangsiantar
- Siantar Selatan, Pematangsiantar
- Siantar Timur, Pematangsiantar
- Siantar Utara, Pematangsiantar
- Siantar, Simalungun
- Siatas Barita, Tapanuli Utara
- Sibabangun, Tapanuli Tengah
- Sibolangit, Deli Serdang
- Sibolga Kota, Sibolga
- Sibolga Sambas, Sibolga
- Sibolga Selatan, Sibolga
- Sibolga Utara, Sibolga
- Sibolga, Tapanuli Tengah
- Siborong-Borong, Tapanuli Utara
- Sibuhuan, Padang Lawas
- Sidamanik, Simalungun
- Sidikalang, Dairi
- Siempat Nempu Hilir, Dairi
- Siempat Nempu Hulu, Dairi
- Siempat Nempu, Dairi
- Siempat Rube, Pakpak Bharat
- Sijama Polang, Humbang Hasundutan
- Silaen, Toba Samosir
- Silangkitang, Labuhanbatu Selatan
- Silau Kahean, Simalungun
- Silau Laut, Asahan
- Silima Pungga-Pungga, Dairi
- Silimakuta, Simalungun
- Simangambat, Tapanuli Selatan
- Simangumban, Tapanuli Utara
- Simanindo, Samosir
- Simpang Empat, Asahan
- Simpang Empat, Karo
- Sinembah Tanjungmuda Hilir, Deli Serdang
- Sinembah Tanjungmuda Hulu, Deli Serdang
- Sinunukan, Mandailing Natal
- Sipahutar, Tapanuli Utara
- Sipirok, Tapanuli Selatan
- Sipispis, Serdang Bedagai
- Sipoholon, Tapanuli Utara
- Sirandorung, Tapanuli Tengah
- Sirapit, Langkat
- Sirombu, Nias Barat
- Sitahuis, Tapanuli Tengah
- Sitellu Tali Urang Jehe, Pakpak Bharat
- Sitellu Tali Urang Julu, Pakpak Bharat
- Sitiotio, Samosir
- Sitolu Ori, Nias Utara
- Sorkam Barat, Tapanuli Tengah
- Sorkam, Tapanuli Tengah
- Sosa, Padang Lawas
- Sosor Gadong, Tapanuli Tengah
- Stabat, Langkat
- Sumbul, Dairi
- Sunggal, Deli Serdang
- Talawi, Batubara
- Tambangan, Mandailing Natal
- Tanah Jawa, Simalungun
- Tanah Pinem, Dairi
- Tanjung Balai Selatan, Tanjung Balai
- Tanjung Balai Utara, Tanjung Balai
- Tanjung Balai, Asahan
- Tanjung Beringin, Serdang Bedagai
- Tanjung Morawa, Deli Serdang
- Tanjung Pura, Langkat
- Tanjung Tiram, Batubara
- Tapian Dolok, Simalungun
- Tapian Nauli, Tapanuli Tengah
- Tarabintang, Humbang Hasundutan
- Tebingtinggi, Serdang Bedagai
- Teluk Dalam, Asahan
- Teluk Dalam, Nias Selatan
- Teluk Mengkudu, Serdang Bedagai
- Teluk Nibung, Tanjung Balai
- Tiga Binanga, Karo
- Tiga Lingga, Dairi
- Tiga Panah, Karo
- Tiganderket, Karo
- Tinada, Pakpak Bharat
- Tinggi Raja, Asahan
- Torgamba, Labuhanbatu Selatan
- Tugala Oyo, Nias Utara
- Tuhemberua, Nias Utara
- Tukka, Tapanuli Tengah
- Ujung Padang, Simalungun
- Ulu Barumun, Padang Lawas
- Ulu Moro'o, Nias Barat
- Ulu Pungkut, Mandailing Natal
- Uluan, Toba Samosir
- Wampu, Langkat
