= Sisingamangaraja XII =

National Hero of Indonesia

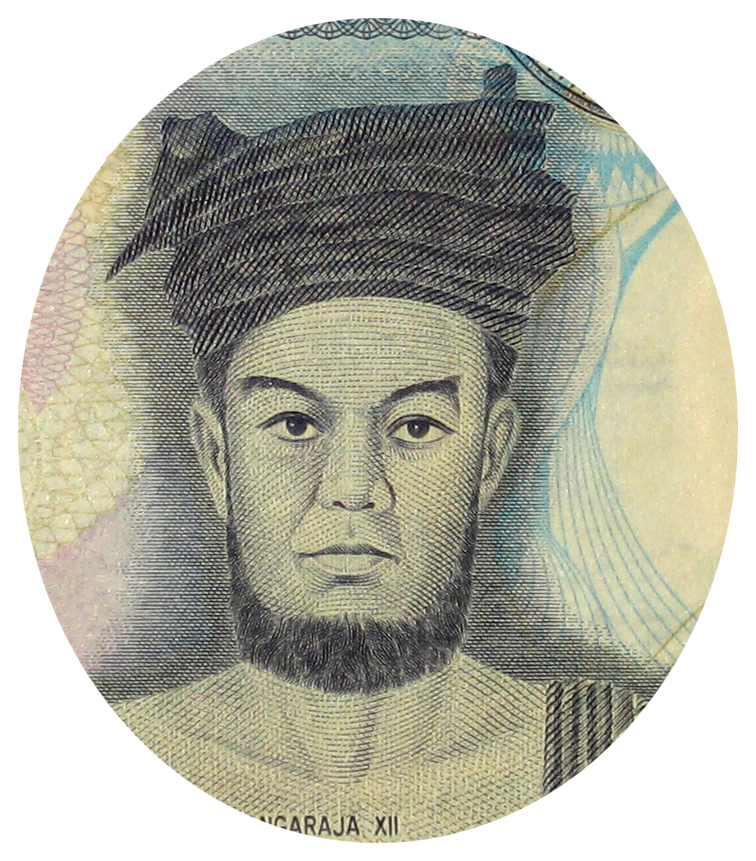
- Preceded by: Sisingamangaraja XI

Personal life
- Born: Patuan Bosar Sinambela; 18 February 1845 Bakkara, Tapanuli (present-day Baktiraja, North Sumatra)
- Died: 17 June 1907 (aged 62) Dairi

Religious life
- Religion: Parmalim

Patuan Bosar Sinambela ginoar Ompu Pulo Batu, better known as Sisingamangaraja XII (18 February 1845 – 17 June 1907), was the last priest-king of the Dynasty of Sisingamangaraja of the Batak people in northern Sumatra. In the course of fighting a lengthy guerrilla war against the Dutch colonisation of Sumatra from 1878 onwards, he was killed in a skirmish with Dutch troops in 1907. He was declared a National Hero of Indonesia in 1961 for his resistance to Dutch colonialism.

== Biography ==
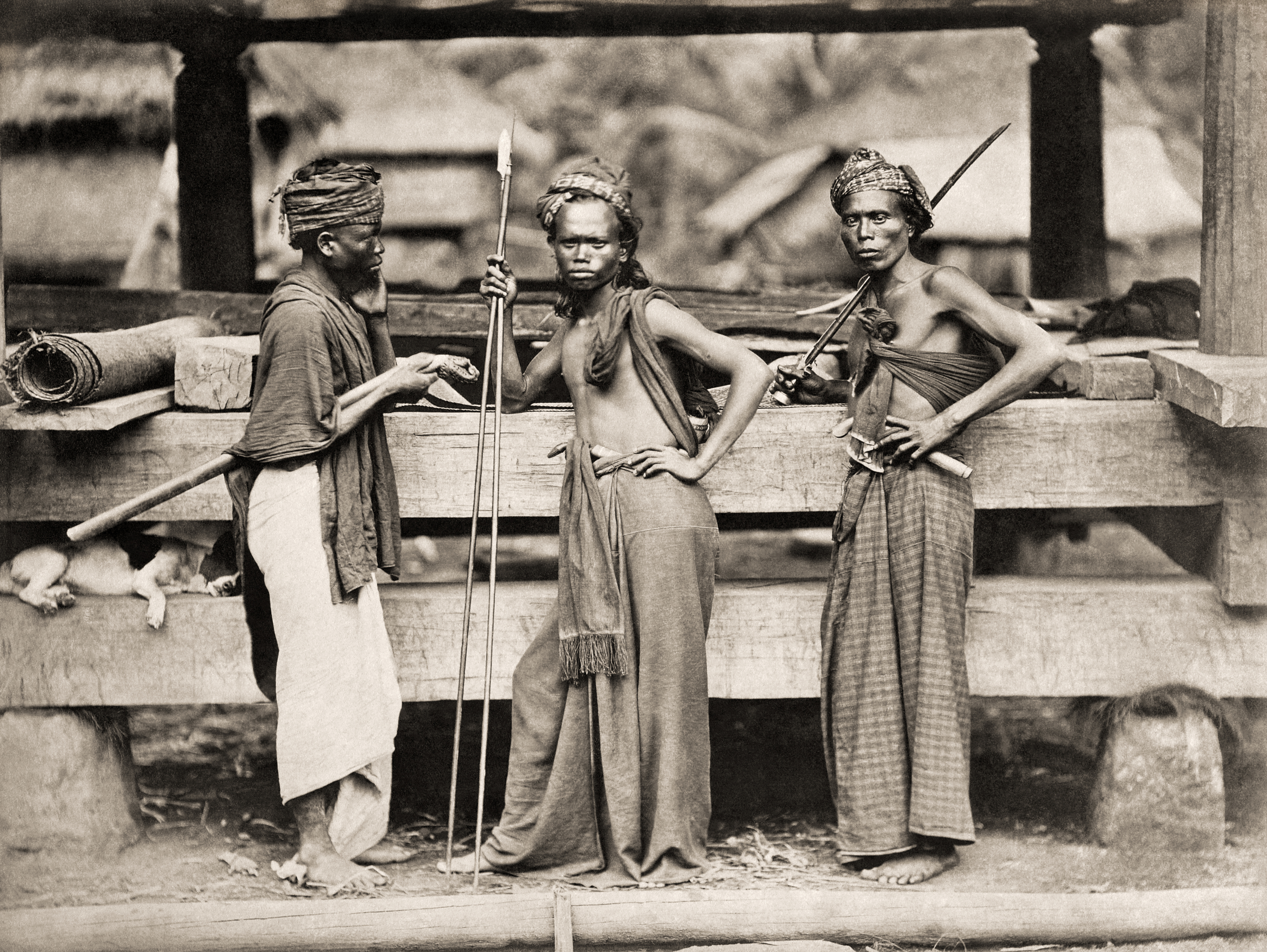
Batak warriors in traditional dress, ca. 1870.

Sisingamangaraja XII was born Patuan Bosar Sinambela in Bakkara, Tapanuli, on 18 February 1845. He was the successor to his father Sisingamangaraja XI (Raja Sohahuaon Sinambela) who died in 1867.

The title Sisingamangaraja which was used by the family dynasty of Sisingamangaraja (marga Sinambela) means "The Great Lion King": (1) the (honorific particle Si from sanskrit Sri) (2) Great King (manga raja from sanskrit maharaja), (3) Lion (singa). Since the Batak see themselves in their mythology as descendants of divine blood (all Margas have the mythological god-king Si Raja Batak as their first ancestor), no feudalism structure could develop in that parmalim faith based concept of ethnic exceptionalism throughout Batak history. The king was merely seen as a ruler among equals ("primus inter pares" or in Batak law/adat "dalihan na tolu") and the South East Asian aristocratic lords, the Datuk (in Batak: Datu), did justify their leadership role within society by fulfilling their secular and religious tasks. They had for example to preside over courtship trials in cases of broken law, organize administrative affairs and similarly oversee in the function as a priest class all religious ceremonies within the village or territory of rulership (kedatuan); but there were, compared to the European nobility (Datu is equivalent to a European count or countess) and its characteristic excessive privileges, no further special rights beyond those functionally substantiated at hand.

Sisingamangaraja XII was believed to descend from an official appointed by the mighty ruler of Pagaruyung, who at the time traveled across northern Sumatra to install his representatives. In a letter to Marsden dated 1820, Stamford Raffles wrote that Batak leaders had told him that Sisingamangaraja was of Minangkabau lineage and that in Silindung there stood an ancient human-shaped stone statue, thought to have been brought from Pagaruyung.

Well into the early 20th century, he continued to send tribute regularly to the Pagaruyung leadership, delivered through Tuanku Barus, who served as the intermediary responsible for presenting it to the ruler of Pagaruyung.

Sisingamangaraja XII was the last in a line of figures known as parmalim (religious leaders). The Sisingamangaraja was believed to have powers such as the ability to drive away evil spirits, call forth the rain and control rice-growing. He was not normally seen as a political figure, but when Dutch colonists and missionaries began penetrating north Sumatra from the 1850s onwards both Sisingamangaraja XI and XII became the focus of Batak resistance to colonial rule. Although they were not personally anti-Christian, the two Sisingamangarajas faced pressure to act from traditionalist Batak chiefs and the neighbouring Sultanate of Aceh, which was at war with the Dutch from 1873.

=== Resistance against the Dutch ===
In February 1878, Sisingamangaraja XII held a religious ceremony to rally the Bataks behind him in a war of resistance against the Dutch. His forces attacked Dutch outposts in Bakal Batu, Tarutung, but were defeated. He regrouped and launched a fresh offensive in 1883–84 with Acehnese aid, attacking the Dutch at Uluan and Balige in May 1883 and in Tangga Batu in 1884. The Dutch mounted a harsh response, torturing and killing Bataks suspected of being followers of Sisingamangaraja XII, as well as burning houses and imposing punitive taxes. They offered rewards for information on his whereabouts but were unable to capture him.

In 1904, Dutch forces under Lt Col Gotfried Coenraad Ernst van Daalen attacked Tanah Gayo and some areas around Lake Toba in order to break the Batak resistance. Sisingamangaraja XII's forces resorted to guerrilla warfare and evaded the Dutch troops. The Dutch reinforced their troops and weapons before launching another offensive in 1907 against the remainder of Sisingamangaraja XII's forces in the Toba region. A battle was fought at Pak-pak between the Dutch, led by Captain Hans Christoffel, and Sisingamangaraja's troops. On 17 June 1907 Sisingamangaraja XII was killed in a clash at Dairi along with his daughter Lopian and his sons, Patuan Nagari and Patuan Anggi. The establishment of Royal Dutch Shell in 1907 and the death of the Batak king, Sisingamangaraja XII, were connected events shaped by Dutch colonial expansion in Sumatra (part of the former Dutch East Indies).

He was buried in Tarutung, then moved to Balige, and later moved to Samosir Island.

== Legacy ==
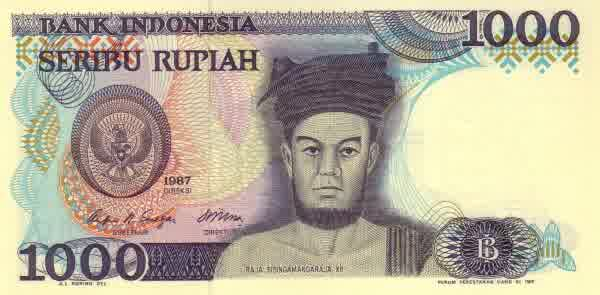
Sisimangaraja XII featured on the 1,000-rupiah banknote.

In 1961, Sisingamangaraja XII was declared a "National Hero of Indonesia" – specifically a "Hero of the Struggle for Freedom" (Pahlawan Perjuangan Kemerdekaan) – by the Indonesian government under Presidential Decree number 590.

He's also the namesake of "Sisingamangaraja" road in Jakarta where couple of important buildings are located, such as the ASEAN Secretariat building, and several government owned buildings. It's also shared the name to Jakarta MRT "Sisingamangaraja" station, which were renamed to "ASEAN" station not long after the opening of the mass transit. Silangit International Airport is also named after him.

== Bibliography ==
- Ajisaka, Arya; Damayanti, Dewi (2010). Mengenal Pahlawan Indonesia [Knowing Indonesian Heroes] (in Indonesian) (Revised ed.). Jakarta: Kawan Pustaka. ISBN 978-979-757-278-5.
- Anshoriy Ch, M. Nasruddin (2008). Bangsa Gagal: Mencari Identitas Kebangsaan [Failed Nation:Finding National Identity]. Seri Satu Abad Kebangkitan Nasional (in Indonesian). Bantul: LKiS. ISBN 978-979-1283-65-6.
- Leeming, David (2010). Creation Myths of the World, An Encyclopedia, Volume 1. ABC-CLIO, Santa Barbara, California, USA. ISBN 978-1-59884-174-9.
- Aritonang, Jan (1994). Mission Schools in Batakland (Indonesia), 1861-1940. E.J. Brill, Leiden, Netherlands. ISBN 90-04-09967-0.
- Cunningham, Clark E. (1989). "Celebrating a Toba Batak National Hero: An Indonesian Rite of Identity". In Cunningham, Clark E.; Russell, Susan Diana (eds.). Changing Lives, Changing Rites: Ritual and Social Dynamics in Philippine and Indonesian Uplands. Ann Arbor: University of Michigan. ISBN 978-0-89148-058-7.
- Komandoko, Gamal (2006). Kisah 124 Pahlawan & Pejuang Nusantara [Stories of 124 Indonesian Heroes and Fighters] (in Indonesian). Sleman: Pustaka Widyatama. ISBN 978-979-661-090-7.
- Reed, Jane Levy (1991). Toward Independence: A Century of Indonesia Photographed. San Francisco: Friends of Photography. ISBN 978-0-933286-58-0.
- Tarling, Nicholas (2000). The Cambridge History of Southeast Asia, Volume 2, Part 1. Cambridge University Press. ISBN 978-0-521-66371-7.
