= Labuhanbatu Regency =

Regency in North Sumatra, Indonesia

Labuhanbatu Regency Kabupaten Labuhanbatu
- Regency

Other transcription(s)
  - Jawi: لابوهن باتو
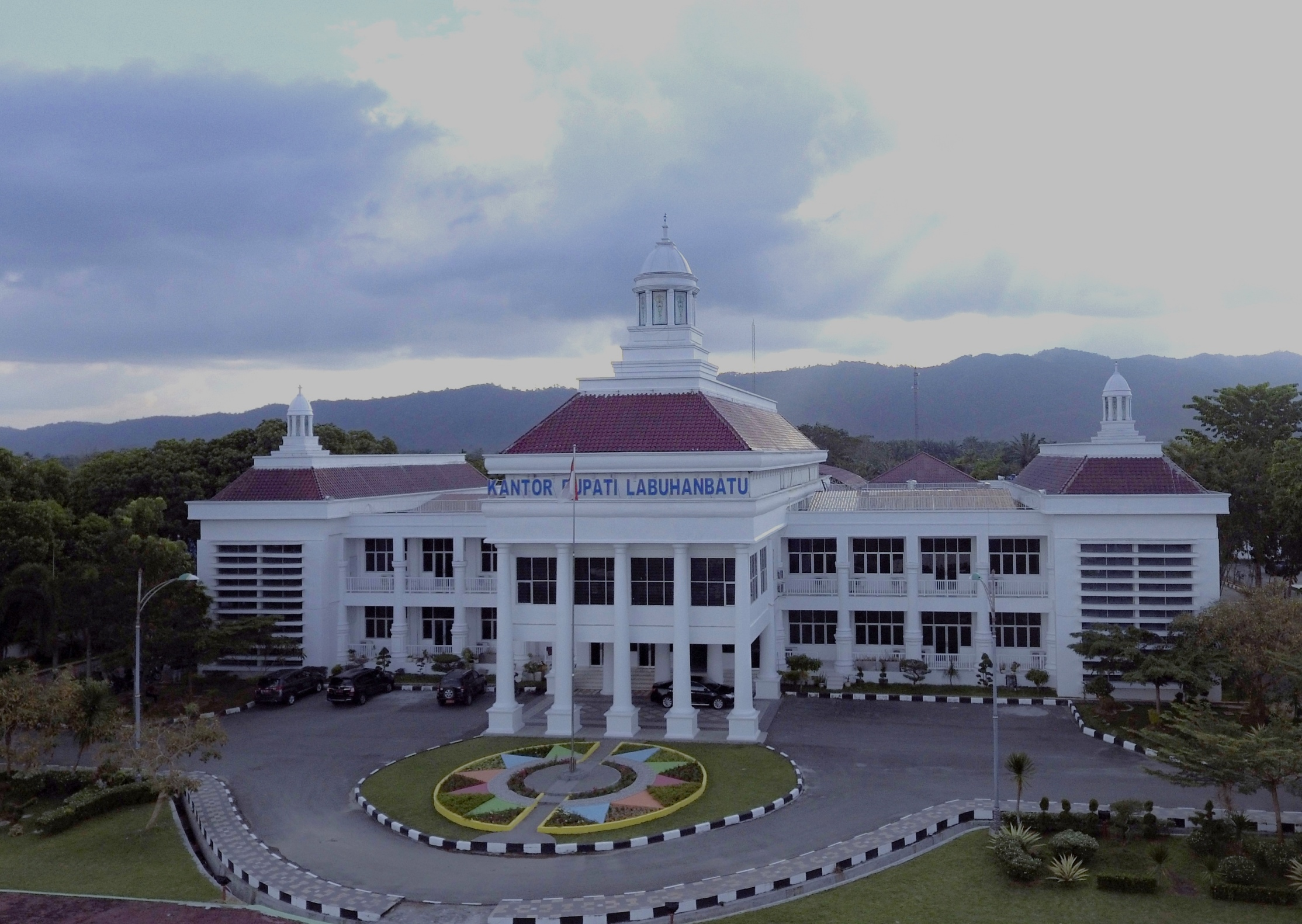
- Regent office of Labuhanbatu in Rantauprapat

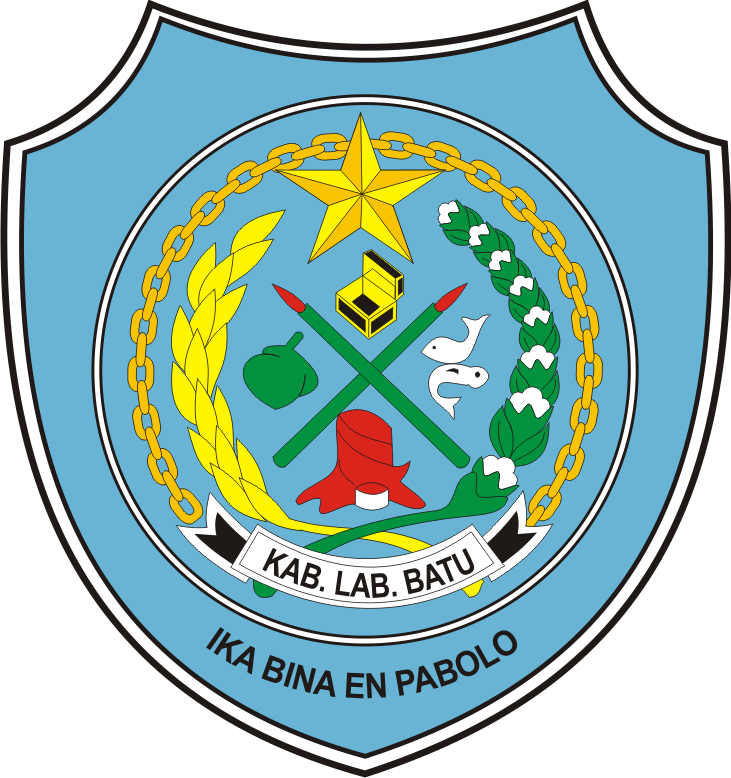
- Coat of arms
- Motto(s): Ika Bina En Pabolo (It's Built It's Repaired)
- Coordinates: 2.2667°N 100.1000°E
- Country: Indonesia
- Province: North Sumatra
- Regency seat: Rantau Prapat

Government
  - Regent: Maya Hasmita
  - Vice Regent: Jamri
  - Chairwoman of Council of Representatives: Meika Riyanti Siregar (Golkar)
  - Vice Chairpeople of Council of Representatives: Abdul Karim Hasibuan (Gerindra), Juraidah Harahap (People's Conscience Party) and M Rasyid Rangkuti (Nasdem)

Area
  - Total: 2,772.57 km^{2} (1,070.50 sq mi)

Population (mid 2025 estimate)
  - Total: 527,043
  - Density: 190.092/km^{2} (492.336/sq mi)
- Time zone: UTC+7 (WIB)
- Website: www.labuhanbatukab.go.id

Labuhanbatu Regency (Kabupaten Labuhanbatu, alternatively Kabupaten Labuhan Batu), alternatively written in space as Labuhan Batu Regency, is a regency of North Sumatra Province in Indonesia. Its administrative seat is Rantau Prapat. An original regency (formed on 7 November 1956) of the province, it had an area of 9,703 km^{2} as of early 2008, prior to the separation out of its southern and its north-western districts respectively to create the new South Labuhanbatu and North Labuhanbatu Regencies on 21 July 2008 (in accordance with Laws Nos. 22 and 23 respectively of that year).

Subsequently, the reduced regency has an area of 2,772.57 km^{2} and had a census population in 2010 of 415,248, which rose to 493,899 at the 2020 Census; the official estimate as of mid 2025 was 527,043 (comprising 267,450 males and 259,590 females).

The Panai Estuary, which consists of the Bilah River and Barumun River, is located in this regency, and it was the seat of the ancient Buddhist trading kingdom of Pannai, ca. 11th to 14th centuries, connected to the Bahal temple in North Padang Lawas Regency.

== Administrative districts ==
Following the separation off of thirteen districts (kecamatan) to form the new South Labuhanbatu and North Labuhanbatu Regencies on 21 July 2008 (in accordance with the enabling Laws enacted on 24 June 2008), the reduced regency is now divided administratively into nine districts, tabulated below with their areas and their populations at the 2010 Census and the 2020 Census, together with the official estimates as of mid 2025. The table also includes the locations of the district administrative centres, the number of administrative villages in each district (totaling 75 rural desa and 23 urban kelurahan - the latter chiefly in the town of Rantau Prapat), and its post code.

Kode Wilayah	Name of District (kecamatan)	Area in km^{2}	Pop'n Census 2010	Pop'n Census 2020	Pop'n Estimate mid 2025	Admin centre	No. of villages	Post code
12.0.09	Bilah Hulu (Upper Bilah)	385.02	56,388	64,416	67,717	Aek Nabara	24	21451
12.10.14	Pangkatan	271.13	31,738	37,766	40,290	Pangkatan	7	21462
12.10.07	Bilah Barat (West Bilah)	291.05	33,753	39,953	42,542	Janji	10	21411 ^{(a)}
12.10.08	Bilah Hilir (Lower Bilah)	472.26	49,928	59,370	63,322	Negeri Lama	13 ^{(b)}	21471
12.10.20	Panai Hulu (Upper Panai)	225.98	33,144	38,028	40,039	Tanjung Sarang Elang	7	21470
12.10.18	Panai Tengah ^{(c)} (Middle Panai)	584.56	33,570	41,143	44,363	Labuhan Bilik	10 ^{(d)}	21472
12.10.19	Panai Hilir ^{(e)} (Lower Panai)	391.13	35,811	42,761	45,676	Sei Berombang	8 ^{(f)}	21473
12.10.02	Rantau Selatan (South Rantau Prapat)	60.20	57,948	73,977	80,949	Sioldengan	9 ^{(g)}	21421 - 21429
12.10.01	Rantau Utara (North Rantau Prapat)	91.24	82,830	96,485	102,145	Rantau Prapat	10 ^{(h)}	21411 - 21419
	Totals	2,772.57	415,110	493,899	527,043	Rantau Prapat	98	

Notes: (a) except the desa of Kampung Baru, which has a post code of 21415.
(b) including the two kelurahan of Negeri Lama and Negeri Baru, with 7,113 and 5,108 inhabitants respectively as at mid 2024.
(c) including the offshore island of Pulau Ongah Labuhan. (d) including the kelurahan of Labuhan Bilik, with 4,110 inhabitants as at mid 2024.
(e) including the offshore island of Pulau Sikantan. (f) including the kelurahan of Sei Berombang, with 13,590 inhabitants as at mid 2024.
(g) comprises 9 kelurahan - Bakaran Batu, Danobale, Lobu Sona, Perdamean, Sidorejo, Sigambal, Sioldengan, Ujung Bandar and Ujung Kompas; see Rantau Prapat for details.
(h) comprises 10 kelurahan - Aek Paing, Bina Raga, Cendana, Kartini, Padang Bulan, Padang Matinggi, Pulo Padang, Rantau Prapat, Sirandorung and Siringo-ringo; see Rantau Prapat for details.
