= Raja Sisingamangaraja XII Airport =

Raja Sisingamangaraja XII Airport Bandar Udara Raja Sisingamangaraja XII
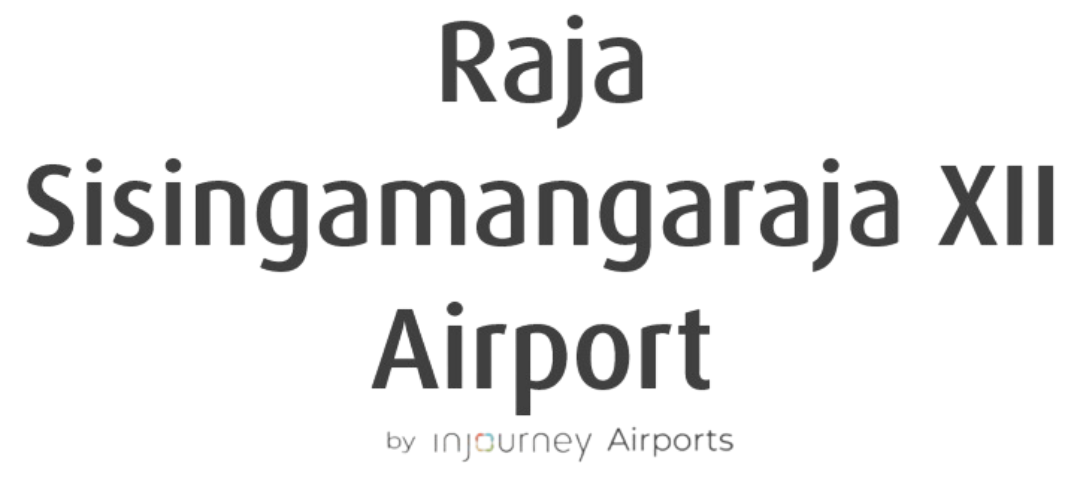

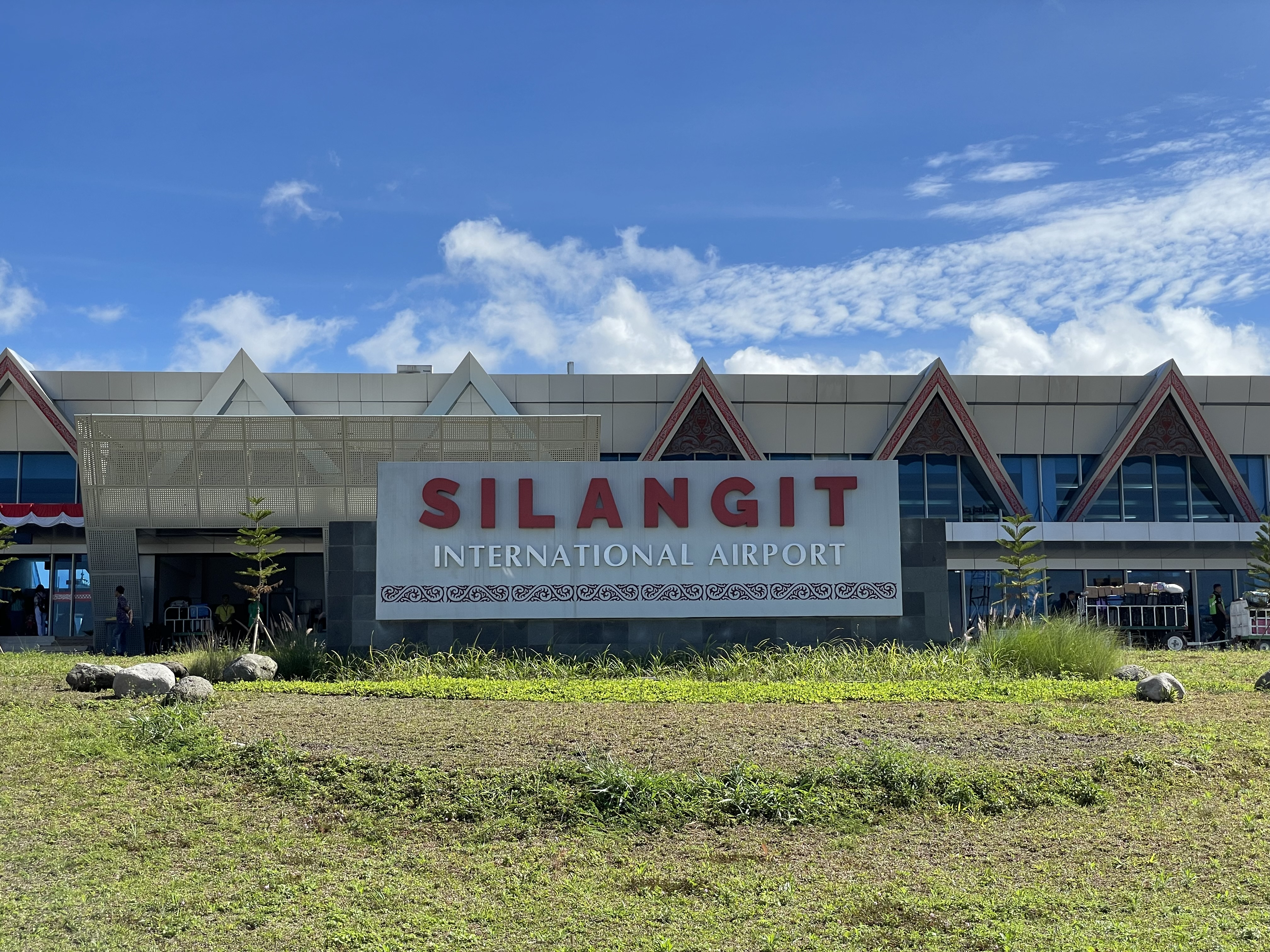
- IATA: DTB; ICAO: WIMN

Summary
- Airport type: Public
- Owner: Government of Indonesia
- Operator: InJourney Airports
- Serves: Siborong-Borong
- Location: Siborong-Borong, North Tapanuli Regency, North Sumatra, Indonesia
- Time zone: WIB (UTC+07:00)
- Elevation AMSL: 4,660 ft (1,420 m)
- Coordinates: 02°15′35″N 098°59′43″E
- Website: www.silangit-airport.co.id

Maps
- Sumatra region in Indonesia

- Location in Sumatra

Runways
Direction	Length		Surface
Direction	m	ft	Surface
09/27	2,650	8,694	Asphalt

Statistics (2024)
- Passengers: 507,176 (▲13.2%)
- Cargo (tonnes): 3,129 (▼11.2%)
- Aircraft movements: 3,387 (▲2.3%)
- Source: DGCA

Raja Sisingamangaraja XII Airport (IATA: DTB, ICAO: WIMN) is a domestic airport located in Siborong-Borong in North Tapanuli Regency, North Sumatra, Indonesia. The airport is located approximately 47 miles (76 km) from Parapat, a town on the shore of Lake Toba, and serves as the main gateway to the lake and its surrounding region. It was developed to improve air connectivity and support economic and tourism growth in Lake Toba, one of Indonesia’s ten priority tourist destinations. Formerly known as Silangit Airport, it was renamed in 2018 after Sisingamangaraja XII (1849–1907), a Batak king and also a national hero of Indonesia. The airport serves direct flights to Jakarta and Batam. It previously operated international routes to Kuala Lumpur in Malaysia and Singapore, but these were discontinued due to the COVID-19 pandemic. As a result, the airport’s international status was revoked by the Ministry of Transportation in 2024.

== History ==
=== Construction and early history ===
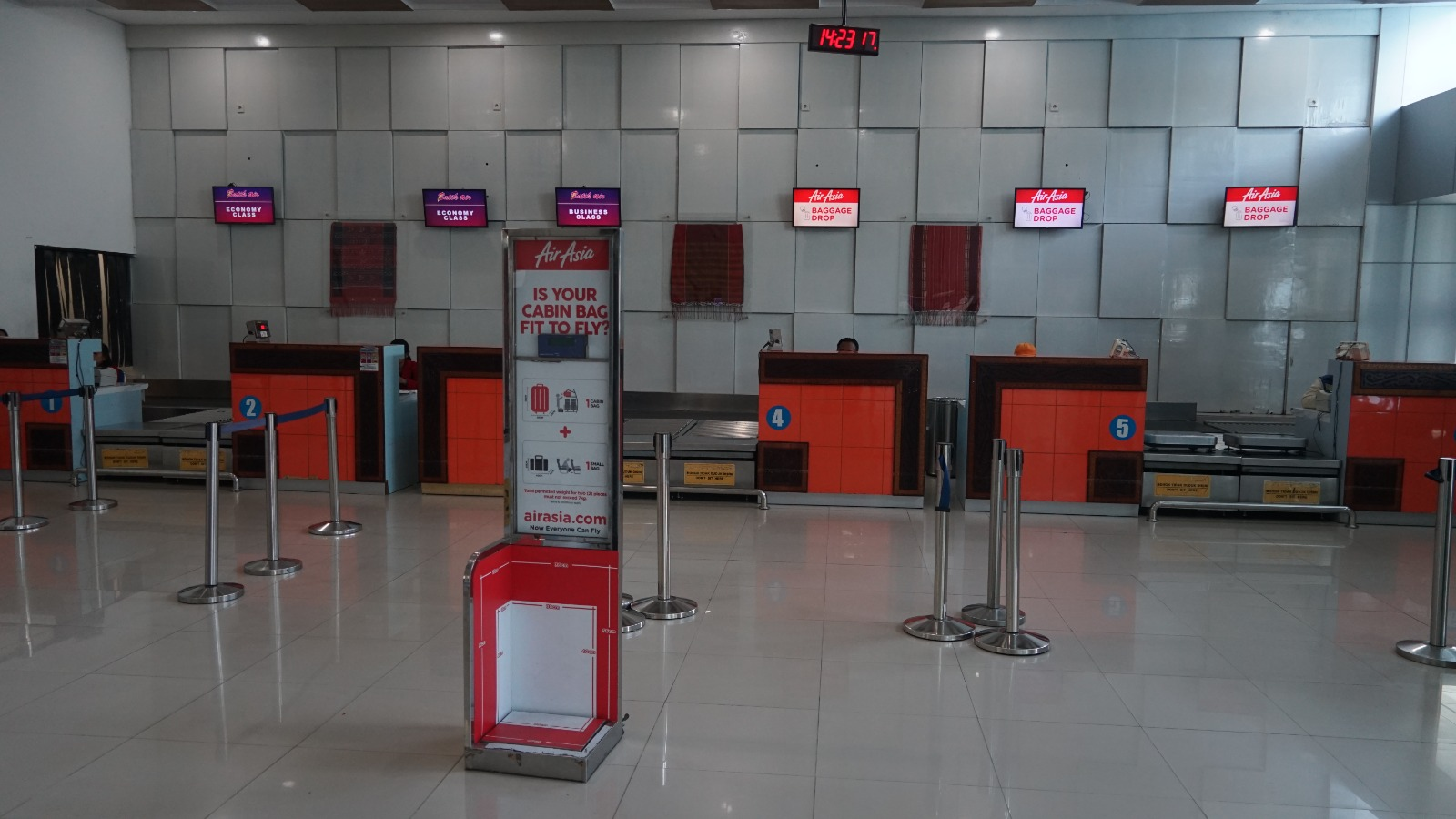
Check-in area

The airport was constructed by Japanese forces in 1944 during their occupation of the Dutch East Indies, as part of the Pacific Theatre of World War II. Initially built as a military airbase, it held strategic importance by facilitating the rapid movement of troops and supplies, supporting Japan’s efforts to control key cities in North Sumatra, and serving as a major defensive position against Allied forces. At the time, the airfield was a modest facility with a grass runway. For the remainder of the war, the airfield was subjected to Allied air attacks aimed at weakening Japanese control of the area.

When the Japanese surrendered in 1945, control of the airfield was handed over to local Indonesian forces. During the Indonesian National Revolution, the airbase was notably used to receive Indonesian independence leader and future president Sukarno, who was visiting the Tapanuli and Lake Toba areas in June 1947. When the Dutch launched Operation Kraai in late 1948, Dutch forces occupied the airfield, landing troops and several jeeps, with a force of two fully equipped companies. After the war ended, the airbase remained unused and abandoned for several decades.

In the early 1990s, the government began planning to reactivate Silangit Airport to promote tourism and improve access to Lake Toba and the surrounding area. After several decades of neglection, the airport underwent renovation in 1995 to support the growing number of passengers visiting Lake Toba. This included extending the original 900-meter runway to 1,400 meters to accommodate larger aircraft. On 9 March 2005, then-President Susilo Bambang Yudhoyono officially inaugurated the newly renovated airport. It was named Silangit, a word derived from the Toba Batak expression Silang di langit or “Cross in the sky,” symbolizing salvation. Local residents believe that Silangit conveys the idea of physical and spiritual deliverance, particularly in light of the suffering endured during the Dutch colonial era, which claimed many lives. As a result, whenever a child asked their mother about the whereabouts of their father, the response was often: Silang di langit i amang inang haporusan (“The cross in the sky, my child, that is salvation”).

=== Contemporary history ===
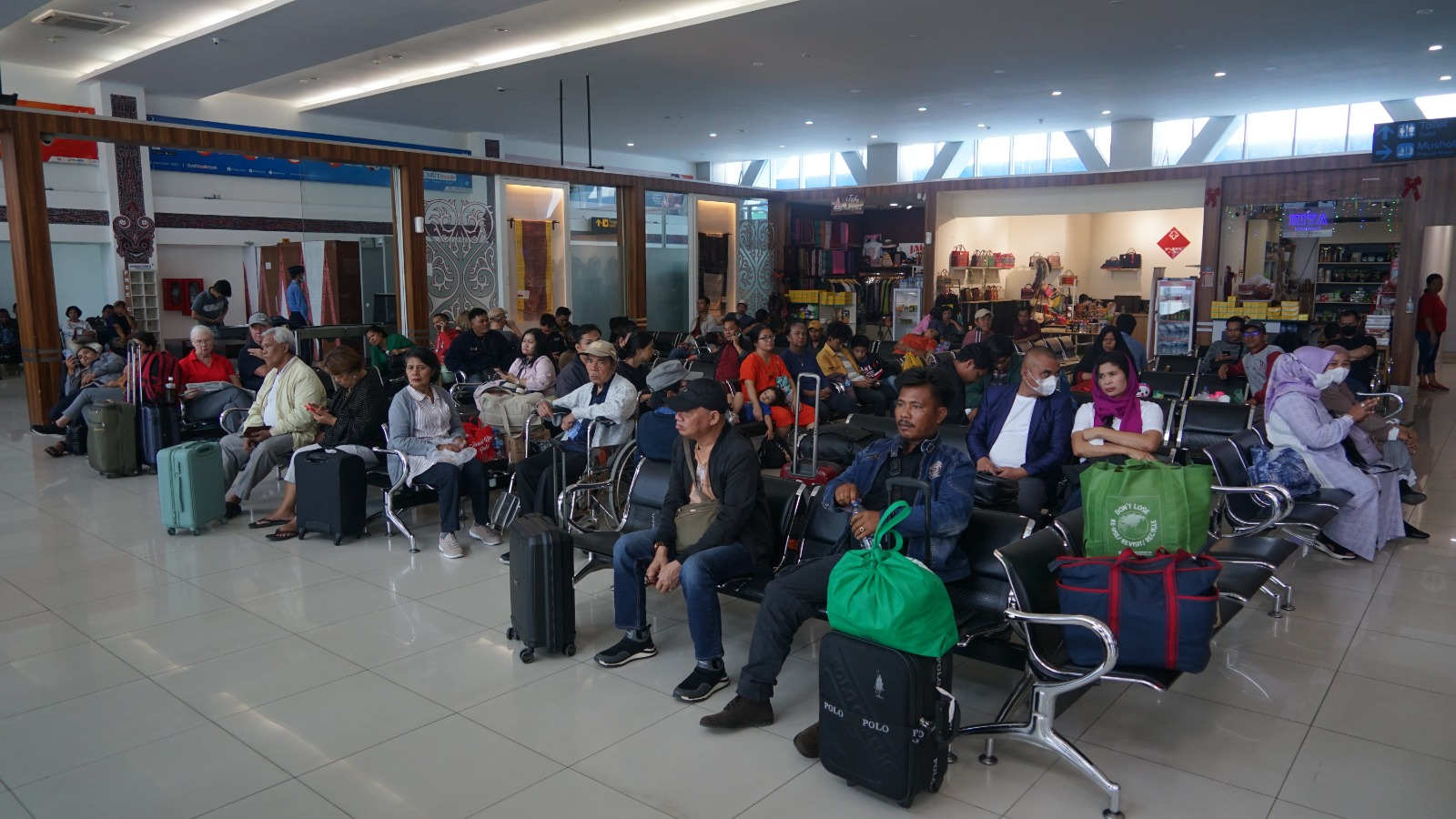
Boarding gate

In 2010, the airport began commercial operations with the introduction of flights between Silangit and Medan, the provincial capital of North Sumatra. Since then, the airport has seen increasing use by tourists visiting destinations around the Lake Toba region. In 2012, management of the airport was transferred from the Directorate General of Civil Aviation to Angkasa Pura II, which was later rebranded as InJourney Airports. Following the management takeover, Angkasa Pura II announced plans for major improvements to the airport, including extending the runway and expanding the passenger terminal's capacity. The company planned to invest approximately Rp143 billion in the overall development.

A major expansion took place in 2017, including the construction of a larger terminal and supporting infrastructure, as well as the extension of the runway to 2,650 meters. The expansion was inaugurated by President Joko Widodo on 24 November 2017. Around the same time, the airport was designated as an international airport on 28 October 2017, marked by the first charter flight to Singapore operated by Garuda Indonesia. Soon after, other airlines also began introducing international services, including AirAsia, which launched scheduled flights to Kuala Lumpur, Malaysia. However, all international flights were suspended in 2020 due to the COVID-19 pandemic. As a result of the prolonged absence of international services, the Ministry of Transportation officially revoked the airport’s international status on 2 April 2024. In 2025, the North Sumatra Provincial Government has proposed reopening international services at the airport to accommodate foreign tourists visiting Lake Toba, including potential routes to Malaysia and Singapore. These services would provide travelers with more direct access to the region without requiring a transfer at Kualanamu International Airport in Medan.

On 8 September 2018, under a regulation issued by the Ministry of Transportation, the airport was renamed to its current name in honor of Sisingamangaraja XII, a Batak ruler and a recognized national hero of Indonesia. He was known for his staunch resistance against colonialism and was killed in a skirmish with Dutch troops in 1907.

The airport was named the best airport in Asia-Pacific in 2020 (under 2 million passengers per annum) by Airports Council International.

== Facilities and development ==
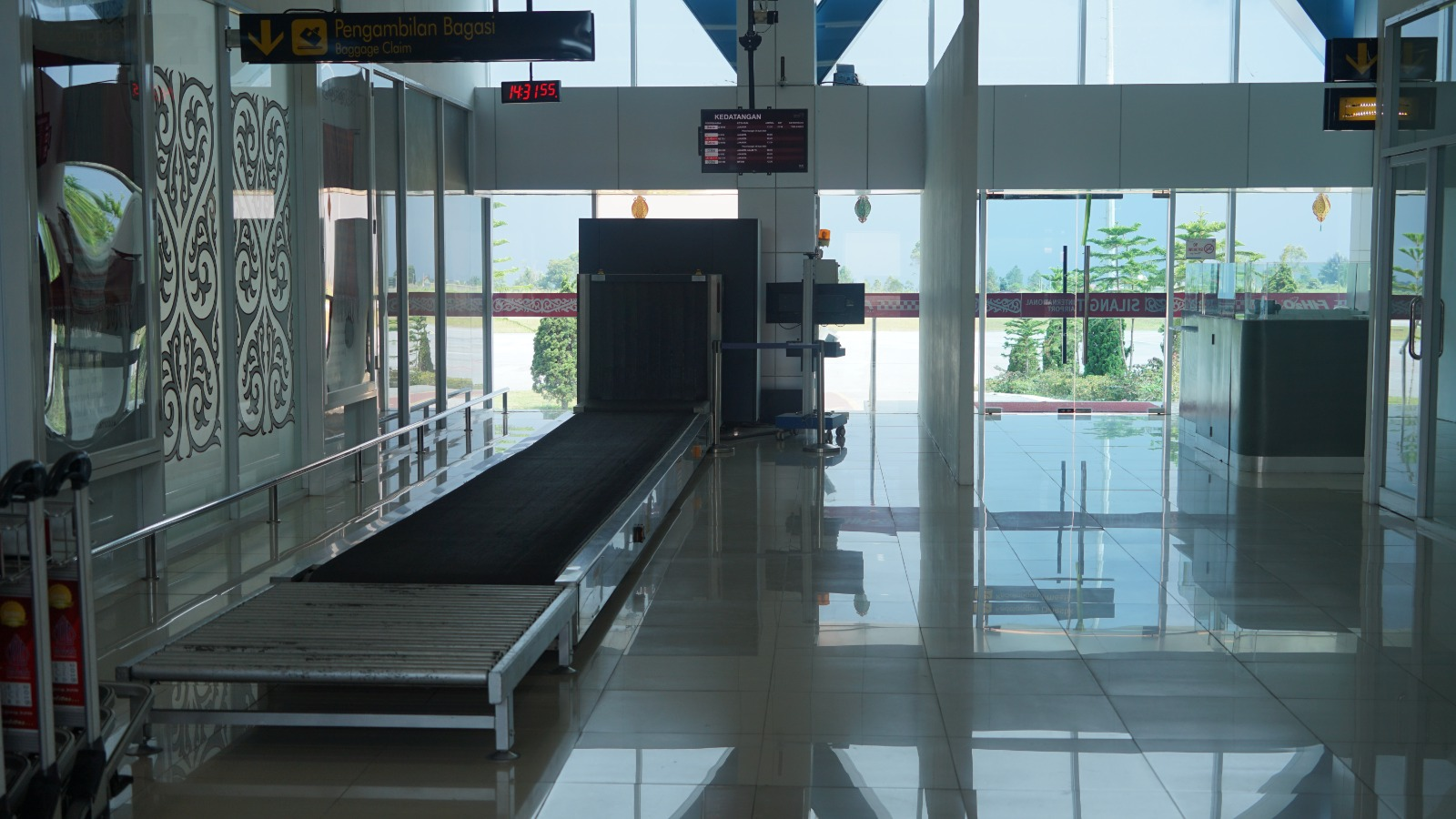
Baggage claim area

To support the growth of tourism, the government upgraded the airport’s facilities by constructing a new terminal, extending the runway, and widening the apron. With the inauguration of the modern, well-equipped terminal on 15 September 2017, the airport began offering a more comfortable and efficient experience for passengers. The terminal’s capacity was expanded significantly, from 36,500 passengers per year to 1 million. Initially covering an area of 500 square meters, the terminal was planned to be expanded to 1,700 square meters. The new terminal also introduced several facilities that were not available in the previous one, including Customs, Immigration, and Quarantine services, enabling the airport to begin handling international flights the following year.

The airport has full digital-based services, which include digital airport bus schedules, e-payment systems, a wifi.id corner and smart baggage claim – a facility to monitor the position of passengers' baggage. The airport is also equipped with tourism information kiosks that give a wide range of information about activities in the nearby area.

The airport has a runway of 2,650 m × 45 m (8,694 ft × 148 ft), which was extended from the original 2,400 meters in 2016 to accommodate larger aircraft and eventually to boost tourism growth in the region. There are proposals to further extend the runway to 3,000 meters to enable the airport to accommodate wide-body aircraft.

== Airlines and destinations ==
Airlines	Destinations
Citilink	Batam, Jakarta–Soekarno-Hatta
Indonesia AirAsia	Jakarta–Soekarno-Hatta
Super Air Jet	Batam, Jakarta–Soekarno-Hatta

== Statistics ==
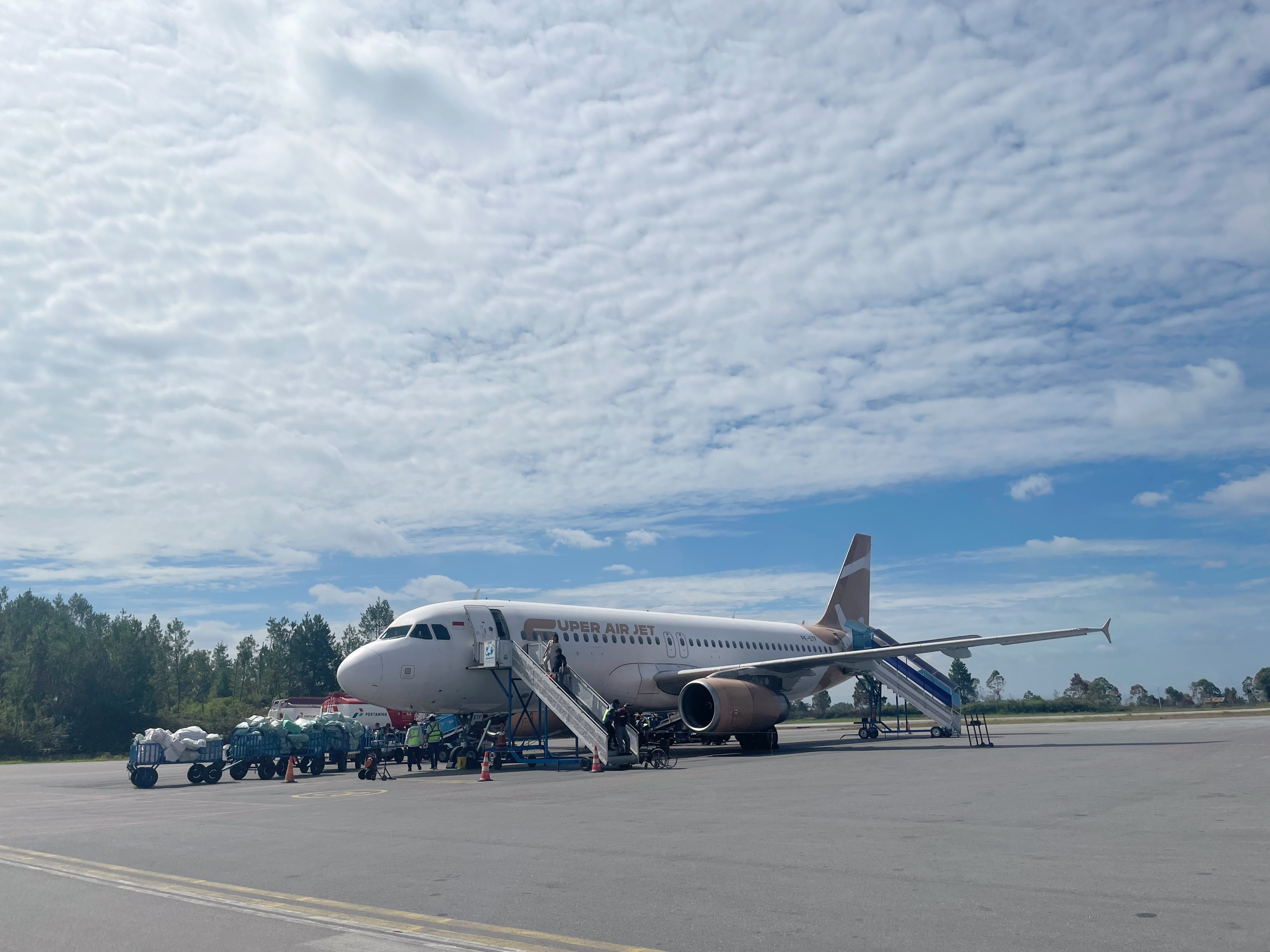
Super Air Jet aircraft unloading passengers at Silangit Airport

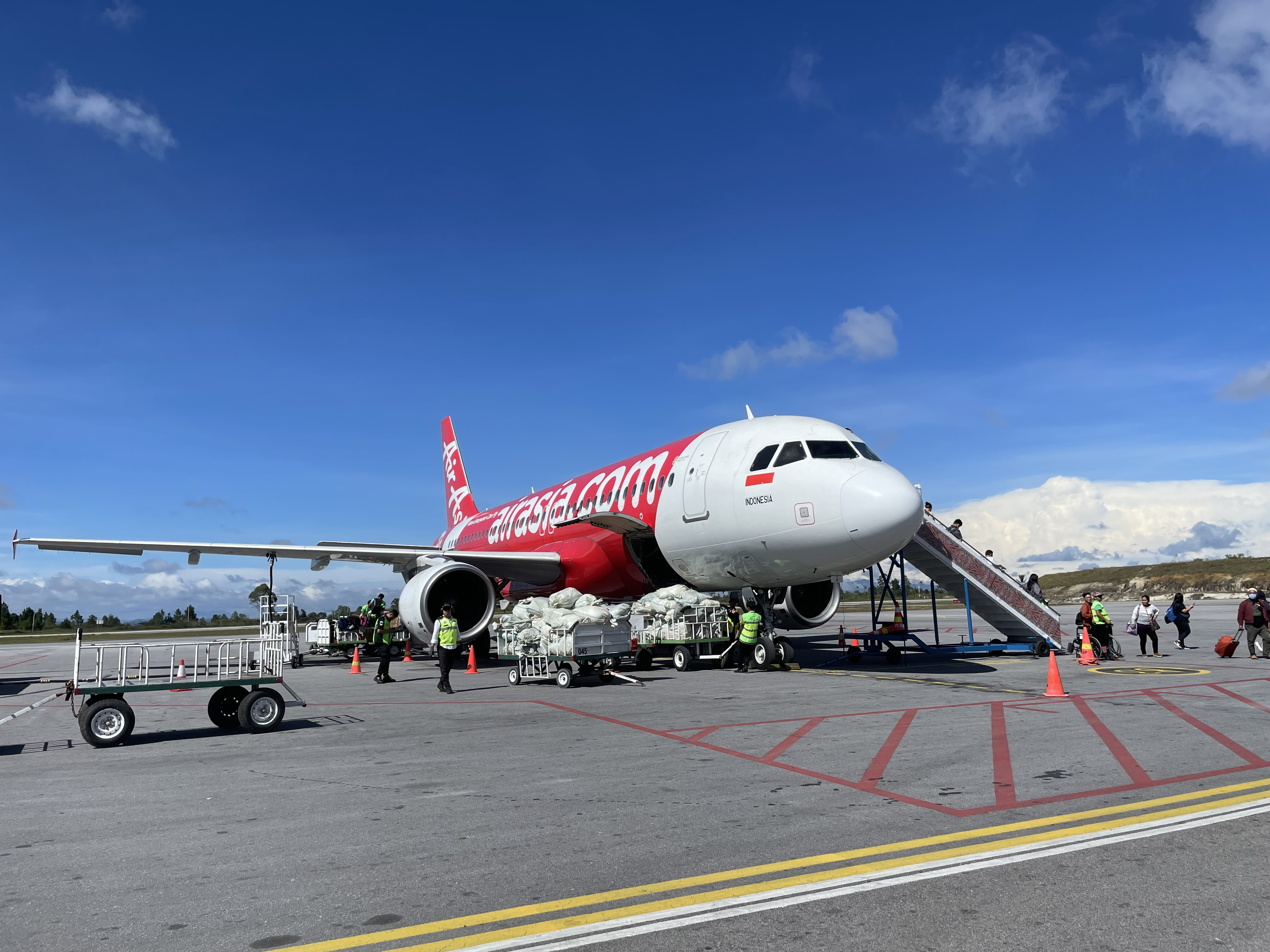
Indonesia AirAsia aircraft at Silangit Airport

Annual passenger numbers and aircraft statistics
Year	Passengers handled	Passenger % change	Cargo (tonnes)	Cargo % change	Aircraft movements	Aircraft % change
2006	N/A	Steady	N/A	Steady	N/A	Steady
2007	N/A	Steady	N/A	Steady	N/A	Steady
2008	5,589	Steady	N/A	Steady	762	Steady
2009	3,644	▲53.7	N/A	Steady	612	▲26.8
2010	5,599	▲53.6	N/A	Steady	776	▲26.8
2011	6,421	▲14.7	N/A	Steady	842	▲8.5
2012	6,354	▼1.0	63	Steady	748	▼11.2
2013	12,544	▲97.4	N/A	Steady	1,208	▲61.5
2014	24,003	▲91.4	N/A	Steady	1,282	▲6.1
2015	17,784	▼25.9	N/A	Steady	953	▼25.7
2016	155,214	▲772.8	12	Steady	2,693	▲182.6
2017	281,354	▲81.3	122	▲916.7	3,787	▲40.6
2018	425,463	▲51.2	350	▲186.9	4,878	▲28.8
2019	376,797	▼11.4	713	▲103.7	3,732	▼23.5
2020	182,586	▼51.5	608	▼14.7	1,928	▼48.3
2021	205,446	▲12.5	2,444	▲302.0	2,190	▲13.6
2022	300,529	▲46.3	2,952	▲20.8	2,382	▲8.8
2023	448,157	▲49.1	3,522	▲19.3	3,310	▲39.0
2024	507,176	▲13.2	3,129	▼11.2	3,387	▲2.3
^{Source: DGCA, BPS}
