= Panai Hilir, Labuhan Batu =

District of Labuhan Batu Regency in North Sumatra Province of Indonesia

Panai Hilir (Downstream Panai) is a district of Labuhan Batu Regency in North Sumatra Province of Indonesia. It had a population of 35,811 at the 2010 Census, which rose to 42,761 at the 2020 Census. The official estimate as at mid 2023 was 45,102. The administrative centre is the town of Sei Berombang, with 13,616 inhabitants as at mid 2023.

There are seven villages in the district:

- Sei Sanggul
- Sei Lumut
- Sei Sakat
- Sei Baru
- Wonosari
- Sei Tawar
- Sei Penggantungan
