= Torgamba =

Administrative district in North Sumatra, Indonesia

Torgamba District is an administrative district (kecamatan) within South Labuhanbatu Regency in North Sumatra Province of Indonesia. The largest district within the regency, it covers an area of 1,258.13 km^{2} and had a population of 118,687 as at mid 2025. It is situated in the east of the regency, and borders on Riau Province to the east. It is sub-divided into 14 villages (desa), listed below with their areas and populations as at mid 2023. The administrative capital is in the desa of Aek Batu.

Name of village (desa)	Area in km^{2}	Pop'n Estimate mid 2023
Beringin Jaya	118.00	4,268
Torgamba	127.00	5,647
Sungai Meranti	127.00	10,607
Bukit Tujuh	115.03	7,278
Torgamba	240.00	8,814
Aek Rasso	37.94	6,721
Totals East sector	764.97	43,335
Rasau	26.98	1,046
Bangai	28.00	3,204
Teluk Rampah	18.36	1,339
Aek Batu	144.89	27,721
Pinang Dame	40.00	4,749
Asam Jawa	66.00	19,693
Pangarungan	123.93	19,693
Bunut	45.00	3,875
Totals West sector	493.16	71,693
