= South Labuhanbatu Regency =

Regency in North Sumatra, Indonesia

South Labuhanbatu Regency Kabupaten Labuhanbatu Selatan
- Regency

Other transcription(s)
  - Jawi: لابوهن باتو سلتن
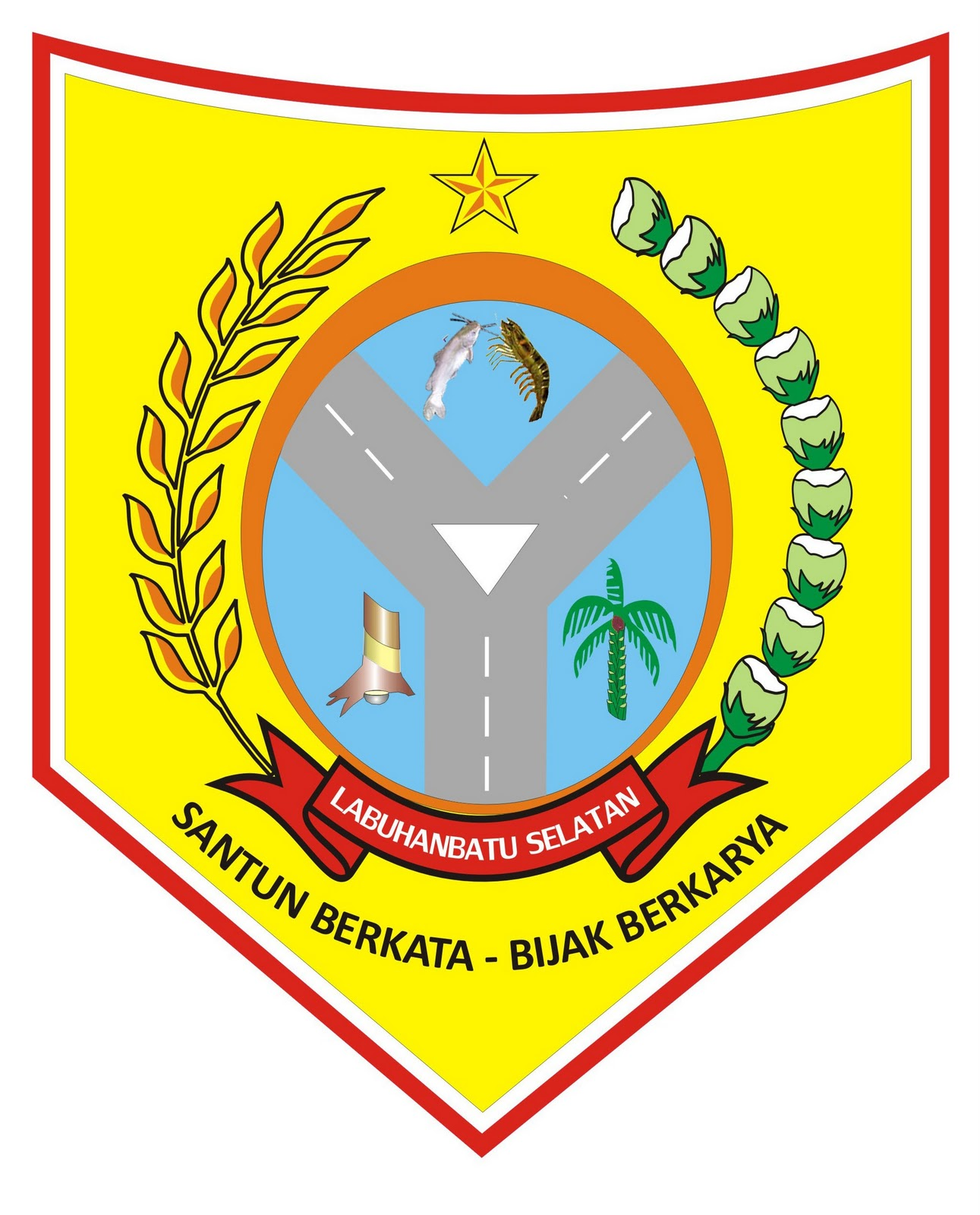
- Coat of arms
- Motto: Santun Berkata Bijak Berkarya ("Talk mannerly, work wisely")
- Coordinates: 1.9828°N 100.0975°E
- Country: Indonesia
- Province: North Sumatra
- Regency seat: Kotapinang

Government
  - Regent: Fery Sahputra Simatupang
  - Vice Regent: Syahdian Purba Siboro
  - Chairman of Council of Representatives: Eddy Parapat (National Mandate Party)
  - Vice Chairmen of Council of Representatives: Zainal Harahap (PDI-P) and Syahdian Purba (Gerindra)

Area
  - Total: 3,051.82 km^{2} (1,178.31 sq mi)

Population (mid 2025 estimate)
  - Total: 342,225
  - Density: 112.138/km^{2} (290.436/sq mi)
- Time zone: UTC+7 (WIB)
- Website: labuhanbatuselatankab.go.id

South Labuhanbatu Regency (Kabupaten Labuhanbatu Selatan, alternatively Kabupaten Labuhan Batu Selatan) is a regency of North Sumatra Province of Indonesia, created on 21 July 2008 (in accordance with Law No. 22 of 24 June 2008) by being carved out of the southern districts of the existing Labuhanbatu Regency. The new South Labuhanbatu Regency covers an area of 3,051.82 square kilometres and according to the 2010 census it had a population of 277,673, which rose to 314,094 at the 2020 Census; the official estimate as of mid 2025 was 342,225 (comprising 171,513 males and 165,064 females). Its administrative headquarters are at the town of Kotapinang.

== Administrative districts ==
The regency is divided administratively into five districts (kecamatan), tabulated below with their areas and their populations at the 2010 Census and the 2020 Census, together with the official estimates as of mid 2025. The table also includes the location of the district centres, the number of administrative villages in each district (totaling 52 rural desa and 2 urban kelurahan), and its post code.

Kode Wilayah	Name of District (kecamatan)	Area in km^{2}	Pop'n Census 2010	Pop'n Census 2020	Pop'n Estimate mid 2025	Admin centre	No. of villages	Post code
12.22.04	Sungai Kanan ("Right River")	486.91	45,407	48,447	51,280	Langga Payung	9 ^{(a)}	21465
12.22.03	Torgamba	1,241.40	99,010	109,970	118,687	Aek Batu	14 ^{(b)}	21466
12.22.01	Kotapinang	342.50	53,954	64,455	72,060	Kotapinang	10 ^{(c)}	21464
12.22.05	Silangkitang	217.27	28,282	30,728	32,812	Aek Goti	6	21461
12.22.02	Kampung Rakyat	763.74	51,020	60,494	67,386	Tanjung Medan	15	21463
	Totals	3,051.82	277,673	314,094	342,225	Kotapinang	54	

Note: (a) including the kelurahan of Langga Payung, with 11,811 inhabitants as at mid 2024.
(b) while not classed as an urban kelurahan, the desa (village) with the largest population in mid 2024 is Aek Batu, with 27,721 inhabitants.
(c) including the kelurahan of Kotapinang, with 24,575 inhabitants as at mid 2023, while the most populous desa was Sisumut with 15,899 inhabitants.
