= Kotapinang =

Coordinates: 1°54′N 100°4′E

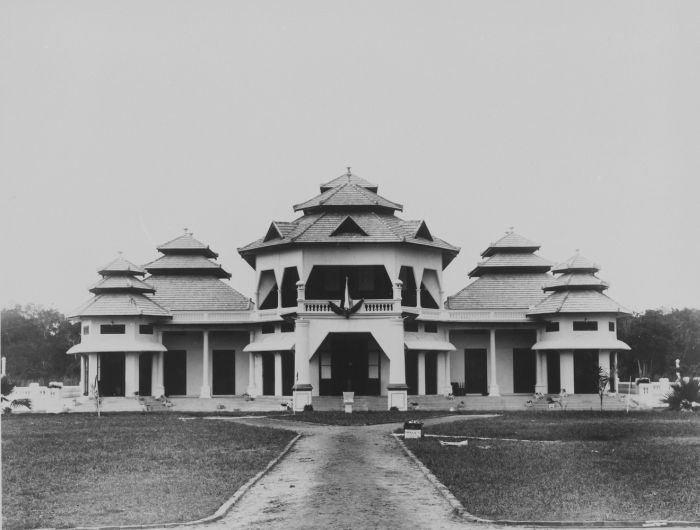
Palace in Kota Pinang (ca.1931–34)

Kotapinang (or Kota Pinang) is a town (kelurahan) and an administrative district (kecamatan) in North Sumatra province of Indonesia. The town is the seat (capital) of South Labuhan Batu Regency, created on 21 July 2008 (in accordance with Law No. 22 of 24 June 2008) by being carved out of the southern districts of the existing Labuhanbatu Regency. It had 24,575 inhabitants as at mid 2023.

== Climate ==
Kota Pinang has a tropical rainforest climate (Af) with heavy rainfall year-round.

Climate data for Kota Pinang
Month	Jan	Feb	Mar	Apr	May	Jun	Jul	Aug	Sep	Oct	Nov	Dec	Year
Mean daily maximum °C (°F)	31.5 (88.7)	31.8 (89.2)	32.0 (89.6)	32.0 (89.6)	32.0 (89.6)	31.8 (89.2)	31.7 (89.1)	31.4 (88.5)	31.1 (88.0)	31.1 (88.0)	30.9 (87.6)	31.0 (87.8)	31.5 (88.7)
Daily mean °C (°F)	26.5 (79.7)	26.7 (80.1)	26.9 (80.4)	27.1 (80.8)	27.2 (81.0)	26.9 (80.4)	26.8 (80.2)	26.6 (79.9)	26.5 (79.7)	26.6 (79.9)	26.4 (79.5)	26.4 (79.5)	26.7 (80.1)
Mean daily minimum °C (°F)	21.5 (70.7)	21.6 (70.9)	21.9 (71.4)	22.3 (72.1)	22.5 (72.5)	22.1 (71.8)	21.9 (71.4)	21.8 (71.2)	22.0 (71.6)	22.1 (71.8)	22.0 (71.6)	21.8 (71.2)	22.0 (71.5)
Average rainfall mm (inches)	263 (10.4)	173 (6.8)	206 (8.1)	203 (8.0)	187 (7.4)	147 (5.8)	127 (5.0)	193 (7.6)	251 (9.9)	290 (11.4)	286 (11.3)	276 (10.9)	2,602 (102.6)
Source: Climate-Data.org
