= Sawit Seberang Factory Railway =

Coordinates: 3°47′53.50″N 98°16′32.47″E

Sawit Seberang
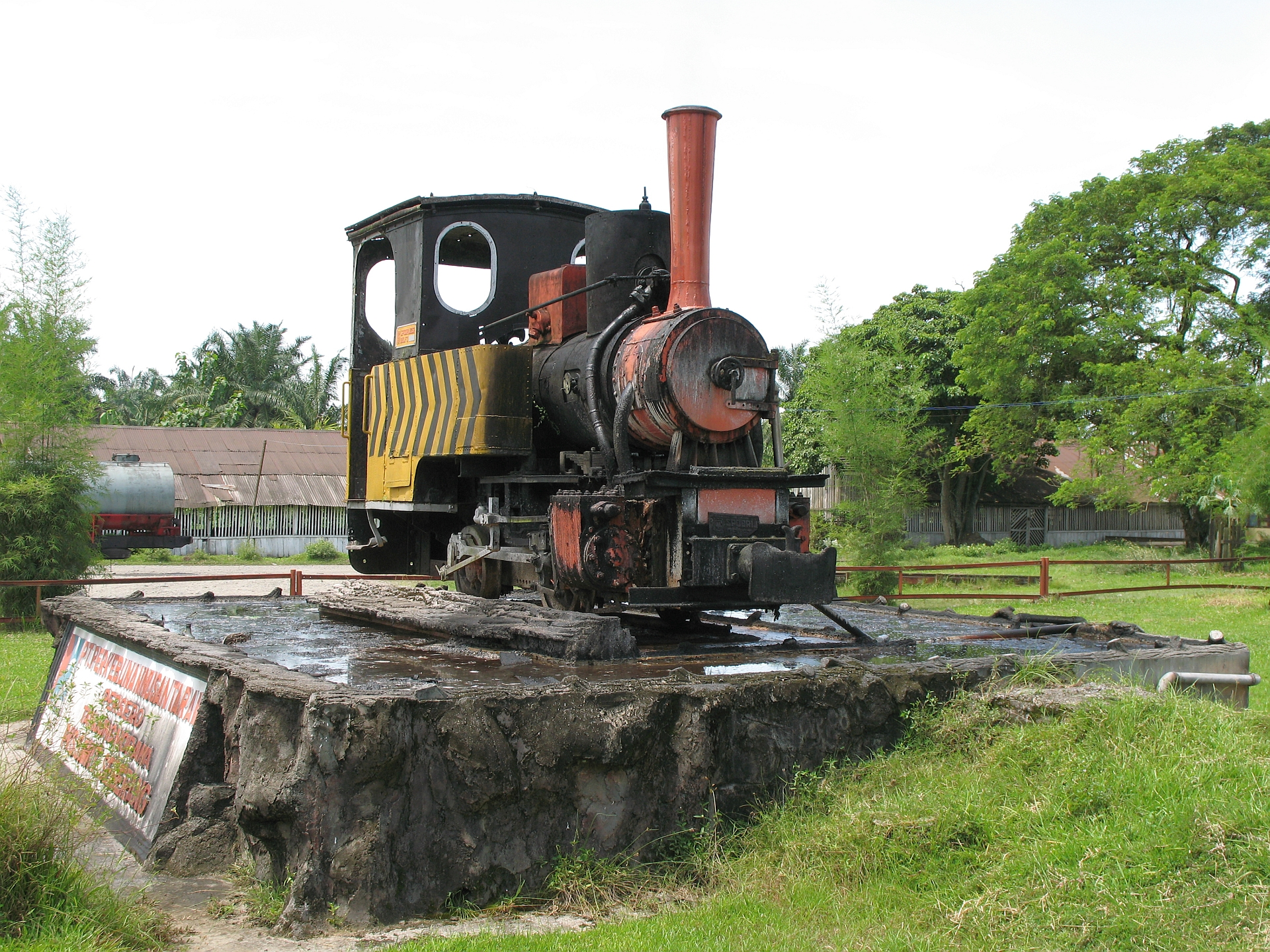
- Monument at Sawit Seberang, July 2008

Overview
- Headquarters: Tanjung Morawa
- Locale: Sawit Seberang

Technical
- Track gauge: 700 mm (2 ft 3 9/16 in) and 1,067 mm (3 ft 6 in)

Other
- Website: ptpn2.com

Sawit Seberang Factory Railway - also referred to as Sawit Sebrang - is the name of palm oil factory Pabrik Kelapa Sawit (PKS) Sawit Seberang located at Sawit Sebrang district (kecamatan) in Langkat Regency (Indonesian: Kabupaten Langkat), the northernmost regency of North Sumatra. Bear its name according to a little village that also has same name, village Sawit Seberang.

== Infrastructure ==
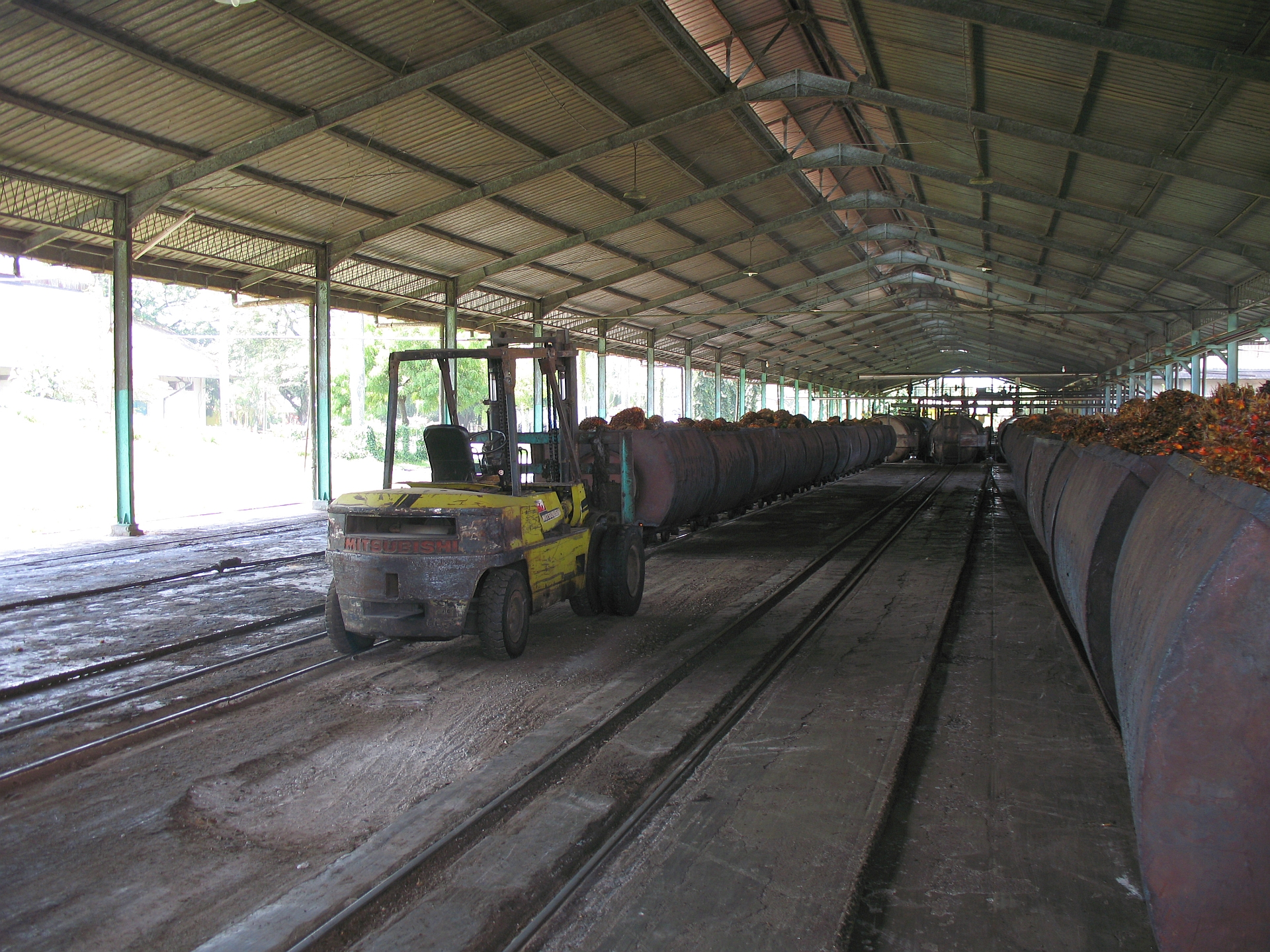
Sawit Seberang, loading, 31.07.2008

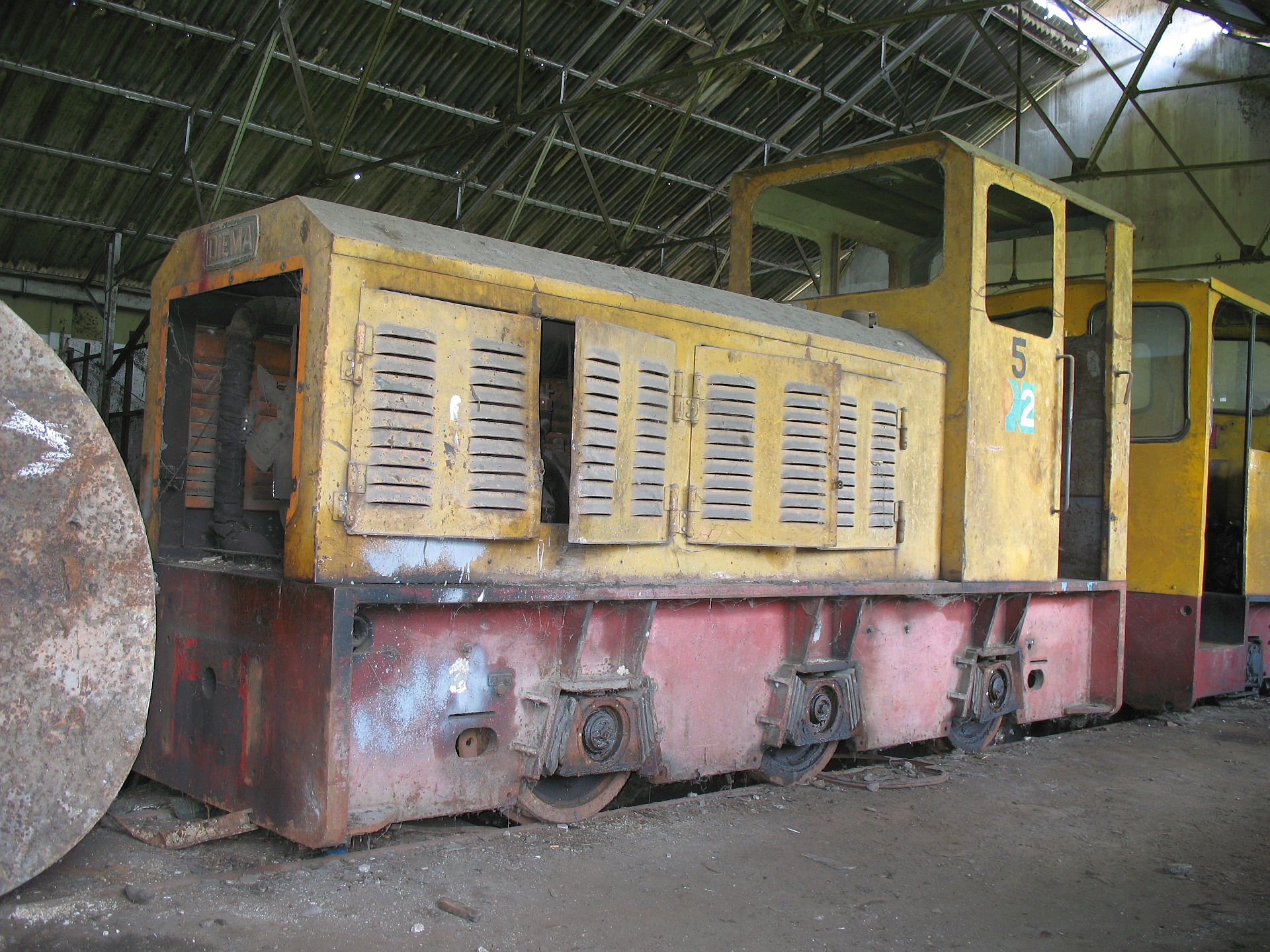
Sawit Seberang, D 05, 31.07.2008

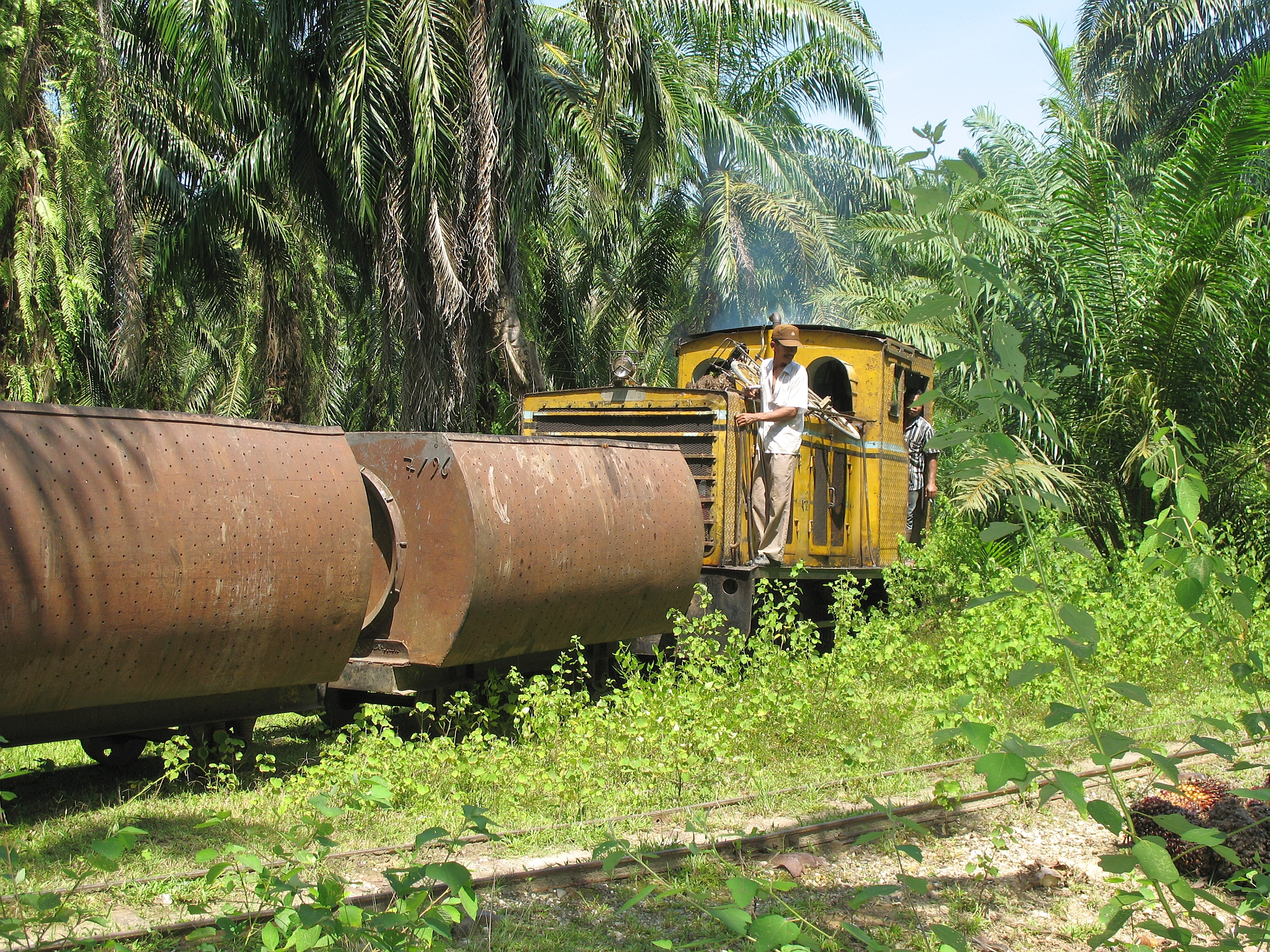
Sawit Seberang, 16 II, 31.07.2008

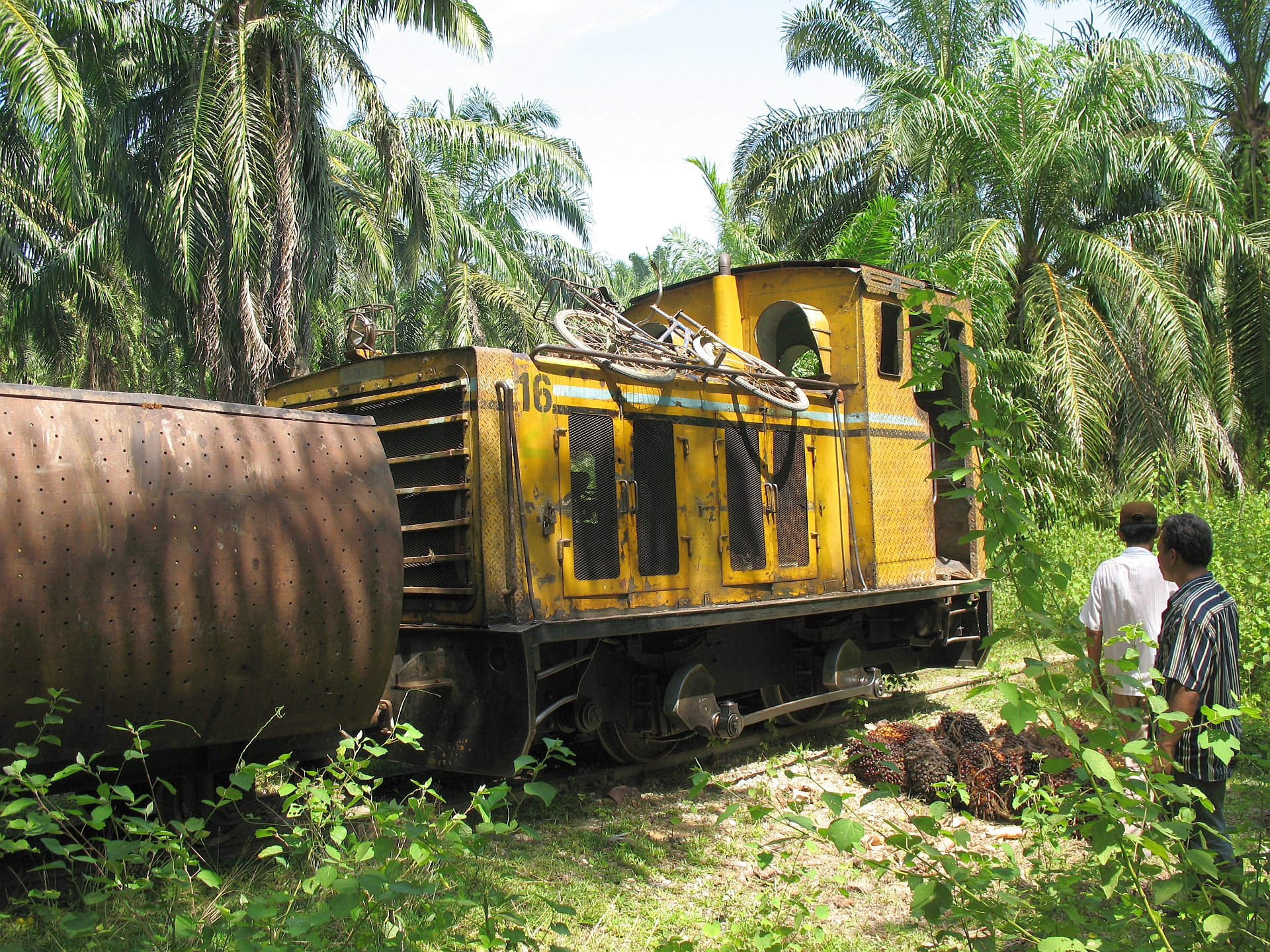
Sawit Seberang, 16 II, 31.07.2008

The factory is located near the north-east border of the village Sawit Seberang, north of Medan, about 30 km northwest of the town Stabat - nowadays the seat of Langkat - and north of the city Binjai, formerly also written as Bindjai. At present it is one of more than two dozens locations of the PT. Perkebunan Nusantara II company. PTPN II was formed in March 1996 and is congregated of agriculture industry enterprises, which produce palm oil, sugar, rubber and tobacco on an area of 117.169,47 ha in North Sumatra. The headquarter is in Tanjung Morawa about 10 km south of Medan, located on the main road to Tebing Tinggi.

During the colonial era the plantations of Sawit Seberang expanded until the fields near Gohor Lama, about 13 km towards south-east direction. Dates of the opening of the factory and the construction of the railway are not known so far. The gauge of the plantation railway was (700 mm).

Railway transport of the palm fruits from the plantation to the factory was abandoned in the early 2010s. Meanwhile, the tracks are lifted. One of the last active locomotives was still parked besides the former tracks in 2012.

== Rolling stock ==
The delivery of locomotives of German origin started in the midst of the 1920s with a 0-6-0 tank locomotive built by orenstein & koppel with the serial number 11119. It is reported to be provided to C. Schlieper for the Plantation Sawit Sebrang and was numbered as "11". A second machine from the same builder, serial number 12247 was delivered in 1933 via N.V. Spoorijzer, based in Delft (Netherlands) and reported to become number "7", some day changed to "6". In the late 1930s Jung provided a 0-8-0 tank engine (serial number 8467) via P. Jemun, Amsterdam as number "5". Other supplies by Du Croo & Brauns, based in Weesp (Netherlands), dated around the same period.

Dieselization started with deliveries from Ruston Hornsby in the early 1950s. These machines were replaced step by step by diesel locomotives from the German builders Schöma and Diema, delivered from 1963 until 1981. Many running numbers of the locomotives were used twice on the occasion of the replacement purchase. In the 1980s there were still reported to exist about more than two dozens diesel, the elder once out of use or derelict. The newest and for sure the last supply in the way of locomotives were two locos which came in 1985 from the Japanese Hokuriko Juki Kogyo Co Ltd from Niigata, which supplied lots of further light railways engines to indonesian sugar factories same time. These two were for a long time the only remaining serviceable machines. During a visit on in July 2008, these two Japanese locomotives still collected the palmfruits and came back to the little factory in the afternoon. All other still existing diesel locomotives were already dumped in the shed. The bigger part of the palmfruits had already carried by means of trucks from the plantation to the factory, where the fruits are reloaded to light railway waggons and pulled and pushed by capstan and fork-lift.

Current locomotives as in July 2008

Name	Wheel arrangement	Builder & Type ( Builder number / Year built )	Notes	Photograph
6 (former 7)	0-4-0	Orenstein & Koppel 50 HP ( 12247 / 1933 )	monument	
D 04	0-4-0 DH	Schöma CFL45D ( 2927 / 1966 )	dumped	
D 05 (former D 13 II)	0-6-0 DH	Diema DFL90/1.D ( 4428 / 1980 )	dumped	
D 15 II	0-4-0 DH	Hokuriko Juki Kogyo HDB-6LS ( 6142-1 / 1985 )	in use	
D 16 II	0-4-0 DH	Hokuriko Juki Kogyo HDB-6LS ( 6142-2 / 1985 )	in use	
D 24	0-6-0 DH	Schöma CFL150C ( 4206 / 1977 )	dumped	

If the specifications in the delivery notes are correct, D 05 is the only built Diema of the type DFL90/1 D. Presumably the D is the German abbreviation for a three (drei) axles loco, but this is not known for sure. There was also a connection to the state railway line of PT Kereta Api Indonesia (Persero) from Binjai to Tanjung Pura. For this feeder line Schöma again provided one single engine in 1978 with the builder number 4240 in 1,067 mm (3 ft 6 in) (Cape gauge).

== Links ==
Media related to Sawit Seberang at Wikimedia Commons
