= Bila River (North Sumatra) =

Coordinates: 2.5°N 100.13333°E

Bila River Sungai Bila, Soengai Bilah, Batang Bila, Air Bila
- Location of river mouth Bila River (North Sumatra) (Indonesia)

Location
- Country: Indonesia

Physical characteristics
- Source
  - location: North Sumatra
- Mouth: Barumun River
  - location: Tanjung Sarang Elang

The Bila River is a river in northern Sumatra, Indonesia, about 1,200 km northwest of the capital Jakarta. It is a tributary of the Barumun River.

== Geography ==
The river flows in southwest Java with predominantly tropical rainforest climate (designated as Af in the Köppen-Geiger climate classification). The annual average temperature in the area is 24 °C. The warmest month is August, when the average temperature is around 26 °C, and the coldest is January, at 23 °C. The average annual rainfall is 3766 mm. The wettest month is November, with an average of 381 mm rainfall, and the driest is March, with 126 mm rainfall.

== See also ==
- List of drainage basins of Indonesia
- List of rivers of Indonesia
- List of rivers of Sumatra
