= Kuala =

Kuala District Kecamatan Kuala
- District
- Interactive map of Kuala District
- Coordinates: 4°14′N 97°52′E
- Country: Indonesia
- Province: North Sumatra
- Regency: Langkat Regency
- Capital: Pekan Kuala

Area
  - Total: 206.23 km^{2} (79.63 sq mi)
- Elevation: 35 m (115 ft)

Population (mid 2024 estimate)
  - Total: 41,622
  - Density: 201.82/km^{2} (522.72/sq mi)

Ethnic groups (2007)
  - Javanese: 59.4%
  - Malay: 1.1%
  - Batak Karo: 30.7%
  - Batak Toba and Batak Simalungun: 1.4%
  - Batak Mandailing: 1.1%
  - Others: 6.4%

Religious affiliations (2007)
  - Islam: 80.2%
  - Protestant: 14.8%
  - Roman Catholic: 2.2%
  - Buddhism: 1.3%
  - Hindu: 0.1%
  - Others: 1.4%
- Time zone: UTC+7 (WIB)
- Distance from Regency capital to district capital: 40m

Kuala is a town and administrative district of Langkat Regency in northern Sumatra, Indonesia. It borders Selesai to the north, Salapian to the west, and Sei Bingai to the south and east. Most people in Kuala are Javanese people, with a significant Karo minority. Although most Karo are Christian, many are also Muslim, and as the Javanese are nearly 100% Muslim, Kuala District is 80% Muslim.

Kuala had a population of 12,459 in 2010, making it by far the largest settlement in the district. It lies on the main road between Binjai and Bukit Lawang.

== Agriculture ==
Agriculture in Kuala District is relatively homogenous, with 6,425 hectares of oil palm, 4,243 hectares of sawah (wet rice), 880 hectares of maize and 3,466 hectares of natural rubber, with little land devoted to other crops. There are five factories in the district.
