= Sei Bingai =

Sei Bingai District Kecamatan Sei Bingai
- District
- Interactive map of Sei Bingai District
- Coordinates: 3°14′N 97°52′E
- Country: Indonesia
- Province: North Sumatra
- Regency: Langkat Regency
- Capital: Namu Ukur

Area
  - Total: 333.17 km^{2} (128.64 sq mi)
- Elevation: 250 m (820 ft)
- Highest elevation: 850 m (2,790 ft)
- Lowest elevation: 150 m (490 ft)

Population (mid 2024 estimate)
  - Total: 54,005
  - Density: 162.09/km^{2} (419.82/sq mi)

Ethnic groups (2007)
  - Javanese: 28.8%
  - Malay: 0.3%
  - Batak Karo: 65.0%
  - Batak Toba and Batak Simalungun: 1.9%
  - Batak Mandailing: 0.4%
  - Others: 3.6%

Religious affiliations (2007)
  - Islam: 58.1%
  - Protestant: 35.6%
  - Roman Catholic: 5.1%
  - Buddhism: 0.1%
  - Hindu: 0.1%
  - Others: 1.0%
- Time zone: UTC+7 (WIB)
- Distance from Regency capital to district capital: 39km

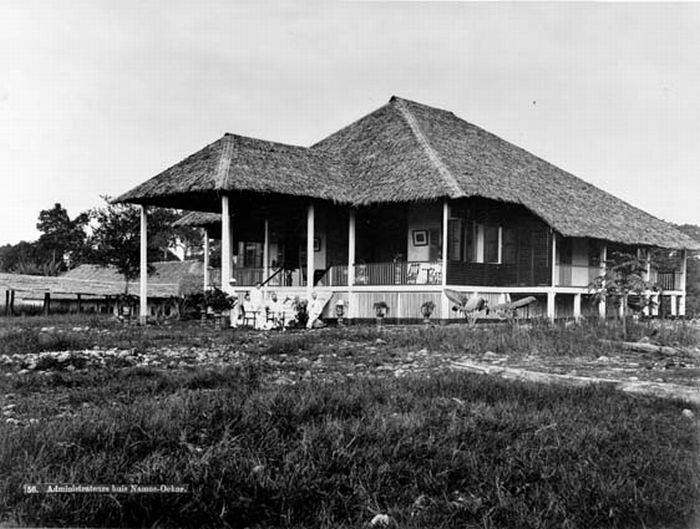
Namu Ukur tobacco plantation, c. 1885

Sei Bingai is an administrative district (kecamatan) of Langkat Regency, in North Sumatra Province of Indonesia. It borders the city of Binjai to the north, the districts of Kuala and Salapian to the west, Deli Serdang Regency to the east, and Karo Regency to the south. Most people in Sei Bingai are Karo. A majority of the people in Sei Bingai District are Muslims, as the Karo are predominantly, but not entirely Christian in this area.

== Agriculture ==
There are 6,509 hectares of oil palm, 6,077 hectares of sawah (wet rice), 7,125 hectares of maize, 1,449 hectares of Natural rubber, 1,150 hectares of cocoa beans, 720 hectares of sugar palm, 308 hectares of pinang, among other crops, grown in the area. There is also a palm oil factory in Tanjung Gunung, along with other minor cottage industries.
