= Bohorok =

Coordinates: 3°31′N 98°10′E

Bahorok District Kecamatan Bahorok
- District
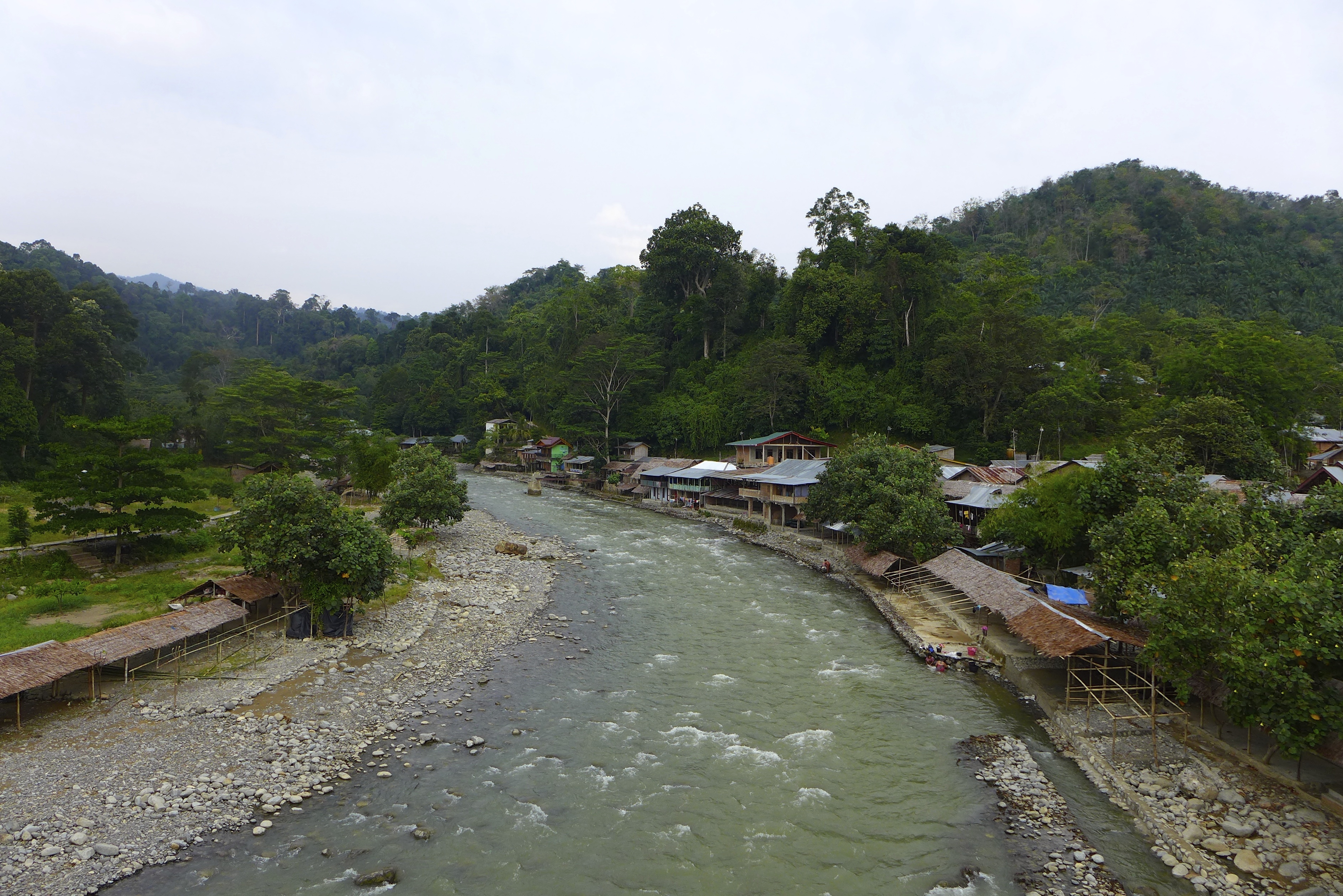
- Bukit Lawang, tourist village at the bank of Bahorok River
- Interactive map of Bahorok District
- Country: Indonesia
- Province: North Sumatra
- Regency: Langkat Regency
- Capital: Bohorok

Area
  - Total: 1,101.83 km^{2} (425.42 sq mi)
- Elevation: 105 m (344 ft)

Population (mid 2024 estimate)
  - Total: 43,104
  - Density: 39.120/km^{2} (101.32/sq mi)

Ethnic groups (2007)
  - Javanese: 53.2%
  - Malay: 22.8%
  - Batak Karo: 17.7%
  - Batak Toba and Batak Simalungun: 1.4%
  - Batak Mandailing: 1.4%
  - Others: 3.6%

Religious affiliations (2007)
  - Islam: 87.7%
  - Protestant: 11.1%
  - Roman Catholic: 0.5%
  - Buddhism: 0.2%
  - Hindu: 0.0%
  - Others: 0.6%
- Time zone: UTC+7 (WIB)
- Distance from Regency capital to district capital: 75km

Bahorok, or Bohorok, is an administrative district (kecamatan) of Langkat Regency, in North Sumatra Province of Indonesia. Its capital is Bahorok town, and Bukit Lawang is a major local tourist attraction for viewing orangutans.

The Bohorok River, a tributary of the Wampu River, joins the Wampu within the district.

== History ==
According to legend, a Karo from the marga Peranginangin and submarga Sukatendel was hunting when he found a child among some bamboo. The child was given to a childless woman to raise, and the area where the child was found eventually became Kuta Buluh. When the child grew older, he married a woman from the Sukatendel village.

He had five children, with the middle child being Dewa Perangin-angin. Dewa Perangin-angin converted to Islam in order to marry Paga Ruyung of Deli Tua.

They had three children: Sutan Jabar, Sutan Husin, and Putri Hijau. Sutan Husin was in a dispute with his brother, Sultan Jabar, so Sultan Jabar went to Malacca, while Sutan Husin followed the Wampu River upstream and stopped to rest where it met another river (the Bohorok). Eventually, he built a house at this point. One day, while on a hunting trip, he climbed the hill from the river and discovered an unknown sweet-tasting fruit tree at the top. He named it Buah Huruk, meaning "fruit atop the hill" in the Karo language.

Bahorok was previously called Tanjung by the Malays because it was the meeting point of the two rivers.

Bahorok was involved in trade along the Wampu River, buying salt at Pangkalan Brandan from the Kampar Malays. Tengku Tan Deraman, son of Tengku Djukdin, who was the son of Tengku Panji Sakar, who in turn was the son of Tengku Syahmardan, and the son of Sutan Husin, was the first to promote the cultivation of land for farming.

The lineage of the Bahorok kingdom, from the 16th century, is said to be:

- Raja Sutan Husin
- Tengku Syahmardan bin Sutan Husin
- Tengku Panji Sakar bin Tengku Syahmardan
- Tengku Djukdin bin Panji Sakar
- Tengku Tan Deraman bin Tengku Djukdin
- Tengku Basir bin Tengku Djukdin, he fled in 1835 to Kutacane from the Dutch, and was replaced by
- Tengku Tan Perang bin Tengku Djukdin
- Tengku Lengkong son of Tengku Tan Perang
- Tengku Hasyim, founder of Bohorok mosque (1917), died 27 May 1935
- Tengku Bahagi, younger brother of Tengku Hasyim
- Tengku Ali Hanafiah bin Tengku Dachrol Bin Tengku Bahagi 2025

Thus, Bahorok is a historically Malay kingdom.

The kingdoms of Bohorok, Stabat, and Binjai eventually united to form the kingdom of Langkat, which later became Langkat Regency under Dutch rule and subsequently under Indonesian rule.

=== Name change ===
The name of Bahorok district was officially changed from Bohorok in 1987 due to the forging of the official stamp of Bohorok. Other government departments still use the name Bohorok.

== Details ==
To the south lies Karo Regency, to the west Southeast Aceh province, to the east Salapian district, and to the north Batang Serangan district.

There are 22 desa and luruh within Bahorok district:

- Batu Jong Jong, comprising 479 square km, larger than the other 21 desa combined.
- Lau Damak
- Sampe Raya
- Perkebunan Bungara
- Pekan Bahorok (the only kelurahan)
- Empus
- Perkebunan Turangi
- Simpang Pulau Rambung
- Sematar
- Perkebunan Pulau Rambung
- Suka Rakyati
- Tanjung Lenggang
- Sumber Jaya
- Perkebunan Sei Musam
- Amal Tani
- Bukit Lawang
- Timbang Lawan
- Timbang Jaya
- Sebertung
- Pulau Semikat
- Sei Musam Kendit
- Musam Pembangunan

The district is predominantly Muslim (88%), with 11% Protestant and a negligible number of other religions. There are above-average Christian populations in Batu Jong Jong (33%), Lau Damak (30%), Sampe Raya (23%), Sei Musam Kendit (20%), Pekan Bahorok (16%), and Simp. Pulau Rambung (13%). The area has 65 mosques, 45 mushollas, and 13 churches.

In most desa, Javanese are the largest group, with the exceptions of Lau Damak (Karo), Timbang Lawan, Timbang Jaya, Pekan Bahorok, Tanjung Lenggang, and Empus (Malay).

There are 40 junior schools, 10 middle schools, and 3 high schools (SMA Negeri 1 Bohorok, plus two private schools). Additionally, there are 17 junior madrasahs (16 of which are private), 6 middle school madrasahs (5 of which are private), and 2 senior madrasahs (both private).

Notable agricultural production includes wet rice fields (sawah), maize, and cassava. The district has only cottage industries.

While there is a paved road to Medan, other roads tend to be unsurfaced or dirt tracks.
