= Salapian =

Salapian District Kecamatan Salapian
- District
- Interactive map of Salapian District
- Coordinates: 3°50′N 98°0′E
- Country: Indonesia
- Province: North Sumatra
- Regency: Langkat Regency
- Capital: Minta Kasih

Area
  - Total: 221.73 km^{2} (85.61 sq mi)
- Elevation: 4 m (13 ft)

Population (mid 2024 estimate)
  - Total: 26,890
  - Density: 121.3/km^{2} (314.1/sq mi)

Ethnic groups (2007)
  - Javanese: 56.2%
  - Malay: 1.1%
  - Batak Karo: 37.5%
  - Batak Toba and Batak Simalungun: 1.8%
  - Batak Mandailing: 0.7%
  - Others: 2.7%

Religious affiliations (2007)
  - Islam: 81.4%
  - Protestant: 13.7%
  - Roman Catholic: 1.6%
  - Buddhism: 0.2%
  - Hindu: 0.0%
  - Others: 3.1%
- Time zone: UTC+7 (WIB)
- Distance from Regency capital to district capital: 55km

Nature of Salapian

Salapian is an administrative district (kecamatan) of Langkat Regency, in North Sumatra Province of Indonesia. Javanese people are in the majority (56% as of 2007) with 37% Karo. As against Karo Regency, the vast majority of Karo in Salapian are Muslims - the population is 81% Muslim and 13% Protestant. In all parts of Salapian, there is a Muslim majority, although it varies between villages. There are 53 mosques, 40 mushollas, 22 churches, and 2 vihara in the district.

The biggest town in Salapian is Tanjung Langkat, on the road between Medan, Binjai, Kuala and Bohorok.

The district covers an area of 221.73 square kms, and the majority of roads are mere dirt tracks, with many in terrible condition. It borders Selesai District to the north, Karo Regency to the south, Kuala and Selesai Districts to the east, and Bohorok District to the west. Population as of 2024 was 26,890.
