= Maritime history of Chile =

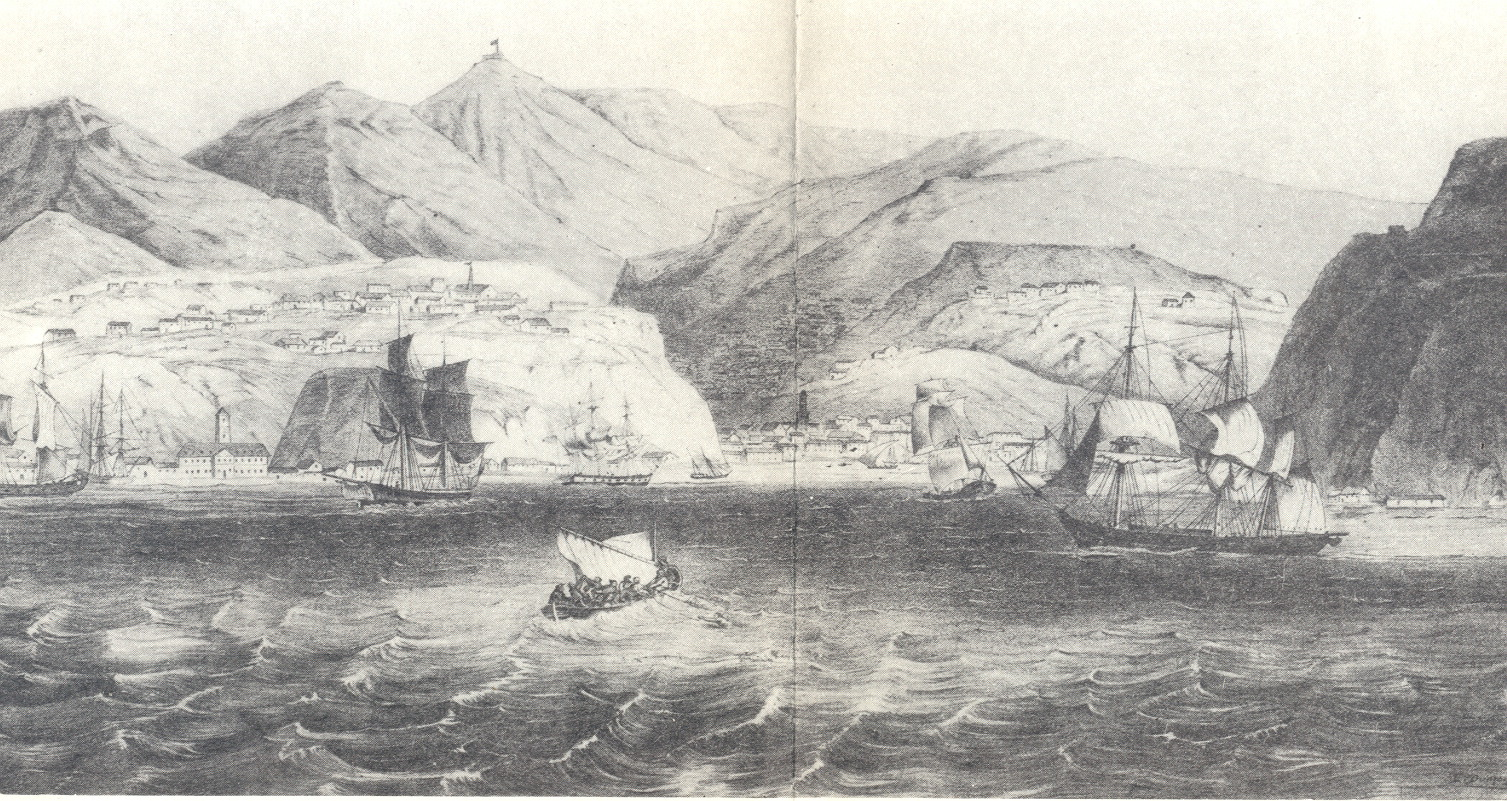
View of Valparaíso Bay in 1830 before it became a major commercial hub in the South Pacific

The Maritime history of Chile started when Chile gained independence, but traces it origin in the colonial era and has ultimately origin in the seafaring tradition of the Iberian Peninsula, Europe and the Mediterranean as well as from indigenous peoples of Chile.

== Pre–Columbian times ==
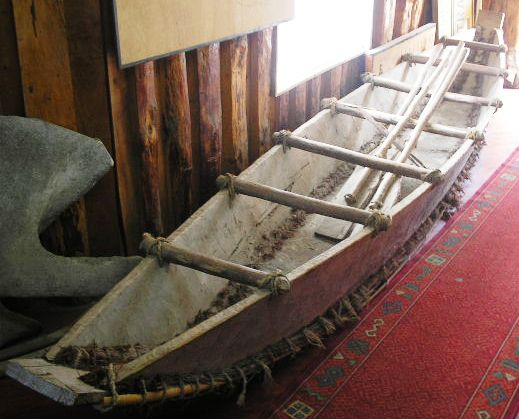
Reconstruction of a dalca a type of pirogue that were used in Chiloé Archipelago, by both Spaniads and Huilliches who adopted it from the Chono people

In the Chiloé Archipelago a watercraft called "dalca" was of common use in Pre–Columbian times. Dalcas were made of planks and were mainly used for seafaring while wampus were used for navigating rivers and lakes. It is not known what kind of oars early Mapuches presumably used.

=== Polynesian seafarers ===
In 2007, evidence appeared to have been found that suggested pre-Columbian contact between Polynesians from the western Pacific and the Mapuche people. Chicken bones found at the site El Arenal in the Arauco Peninsula, an area inhabited by Mapuche, support a pre-Columbian introduction of chicken to South America. The bones found in Chile were radiocarbon-dated to between 1304 and 1424, before the arrival of the Spanish. Chicken DNA sequences taken were matched to those of chickens in present-day American Samoa and Tonga; they did not match the DNA of European chickens. But, a later report in the same journal, assessing the same mtDNA, concluded that the Chilean chicken specimen clusters with the European/Indian subcontinental/Southeast Asian sequences. Thus it does not support a Polynesian introduction of chickens to South America.

In December 2007, several human skulls with Polynesian features, such as a pentagonal shape when viewed from behind, were found lying on a shelf in a museum in Concepción. These skulls turned out to have come from people of Mocha Island, an island just off the coast of Chile in the Pacific Ocean, today inhabited by Mapuche. Professor Lisa Matisoo-Smith of the University of Otago and José Miguel Ramírez Aliaga of the University of Valparaíso hope to win agreement soon with the locals of Mocha Island to begin an excavation to search for Polynesian remains on the island.

== Colonial Chile (1520–1810) ==
In connection to the Conquest of Chile a sequence of maritime expeditions were launched, the first three where; Juan Bautista Pastene (September 1544), Francisco de Ulloa (November 1553 – 1554) and Juan Ladrillero (1557–1558). All these were exploratory expeditions aiming to reach the Strait of Magellan from the Pacific ports of Chile.

=== Spanish maritime policy ===
In the 16th and 17th century Spain considered the Pacific Ocean a Mare clausum – a sea closed to other naval powers. As the only known entrance from the Atlantic the Strait of Magellan was at times patrolled by fleets sent to prevent entrance of non-Spanish ships. On the western end of the Pacific Ocean the Dutch threatened the Spanish Philippines.

=== Shipyards in Chile ===
In the 18th century the shipbuilding industry in Valdivia, one of the city's main economic activities, reached its peak building numerous ships including frigates. Other shipyards of Chile included those of Concepción and Chiloé Archipelago. The Chiloé shipyards constructed he bulk of the ships in Chile until the mid-18th century. In 1794 a new shipyards was established the mouth of Maule River (present day Constitución). Despite some navigators expressing that Valdivia had better conditions than Guayaquil in Ecuador, this last port was the chief Spanish shipyard in the Pacific.

== Independence and republic (1810–present) ==
During the later stages of Chile's independence war it was conceived that the country needed a navy to bring under Chilean control areas that could not be reached by land like Chiloé Archipelago and Valdivia. The newly formed Chilean navy was put under command of Lord Cochrane, who introduced British customs. The Chilean navy succeeded in capturing Valdivia and landing a Chilean-Argentine army in Peru for further fight against the royalists.

Later on the Chilean navy saw action in the War of the Confederation, the Chincha Islands War, the War of the Pacific and the 1891 Chilean Civil War. The navy was also instrumental into bringing the Strait of Magellan and Easter Island under Chilean control in 1843 and 1888 respectively.

During the second half of the 19th century the Chilean navy begun a series of explorations towards the Patagonian archipelagoes. These explorations where fueled by several factors including the establishment of Chilean rule in the Strait of Magellan, the increased trade with Europe and border disputes with Argentina in Patagonia.

=== Chilean Navy put to test at war (1836–1883) ===
==== War of the Pacific (1879–1883) ====
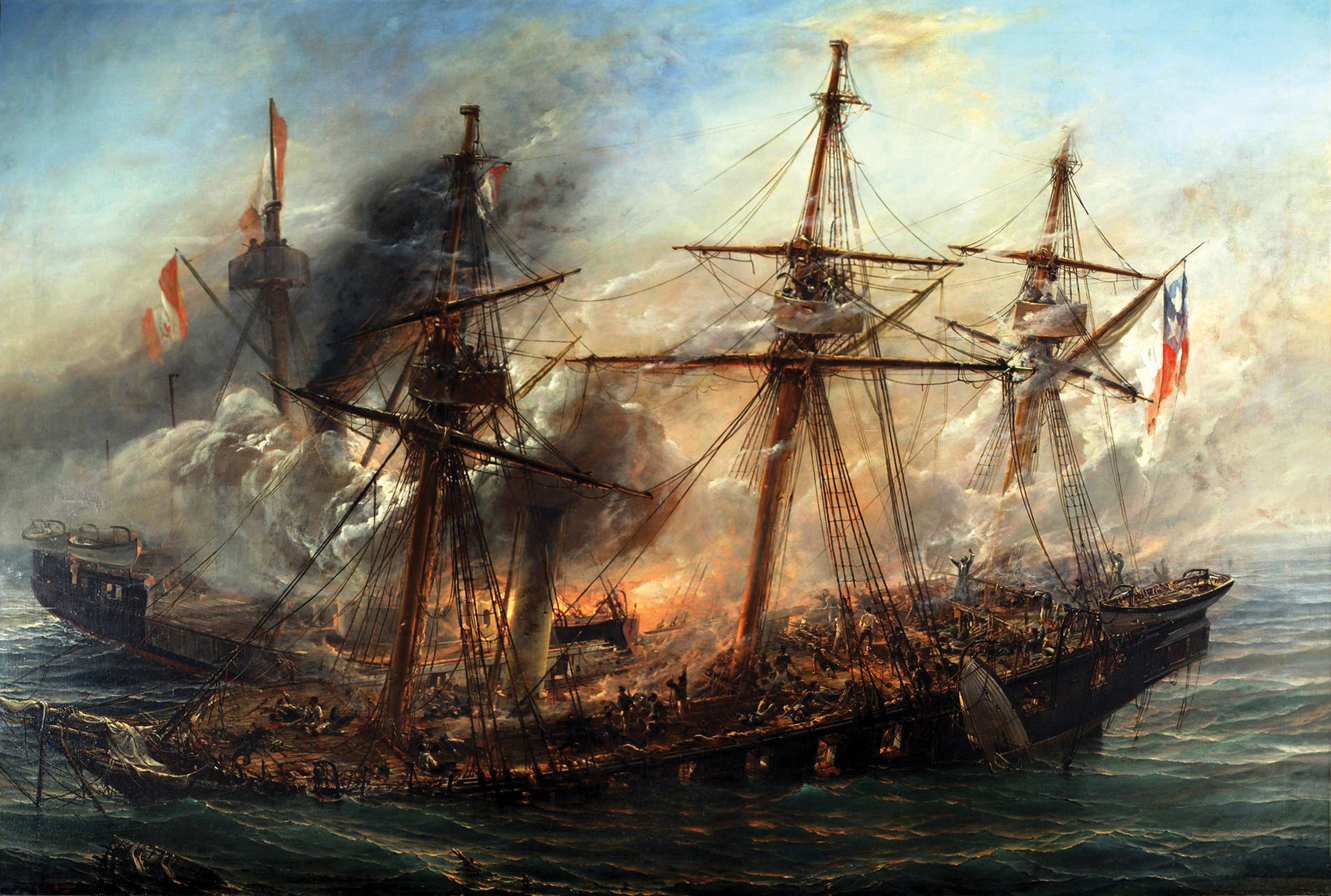
The Naval Battle of Iquique of 1879 shown in the picture is remembered a public holiday each May 21 in Chile, and authorities call May the month of the sea

When the War of the Pacific between Chile and the Bolivia-Peru alliance broke out the few roads and railroad lines, the disputed and nearly waterless and largely unpopulated Atacama Desert turned out to be difficult to occupy. From the beginning naval superiority was critical. Early on Chile blockaded the Peruvian port of Iquique, on April 5. Following a first naval encounter between Chile and Peru in the indecisive Battle of Chipana (April 12, 1879) the Battle of Iquique (May 21, 1879) proved one of the war's most memorable battles of the war as Huáscar engaged and sank the Esmeralda; during the battle, Chilean commander Arturo Prat was fatally shot while attempting to board the Huáscar. In the aftermath, Grau ordered the rescue of the remaining Chilean sailors. Meanwhile, the Independencia chased the schooner Covadonga until the heavier Independencia collided with a submerged rock and sank in the shallow waters near Punta Gruesa. This naval battle gave a tactical victory to Peru as it stopped the blockade of Iquique. Nevertheless, it was a Pyrrhic victory; the loss of the Independencia, one of Peru's most important ships, was a fatal blow.

The Battle of Angamos, on October 8, 1879 proved decisive. In this battle, the Chilean Navy managed to capture the Huáscar after several hours of fierce battle, despite her remaining crew's attempts to scuttle her. Miguel Grau died during the fighting, but his deeds made him a Peruvian national hero. After the loss of the Huáscar, the Peruvian navy still had some successful actions, particularly during the Naval Battle of Arica (February 27, 1880) and the Second Naval Battle of Arica (March 17, 1880), but its remaining units were locked in its main port during the long Blockade of Callao. When the Peruvian capital of Lima fell after the battles of San Juan and Miraflores, the Peruvian naval officers scuttled the entire fleet to prevent its capture by the Chilean forces.

=== Pacific hegemony (1883–90) ===
In March 1885 Colombia thinned its military presence in Panama by sending troops stationed there to fight rebels in Cartagena. These favourable conditions prompted an insurgency in Panama. The United States Navy was sent there to keep order, in light of invoking its obligations according to the treaty being signed in 1846. >

In response to the American intervention, Chile sent the protected cruiser Esmeralda to Panama City, arriving on April 28. The Esmeralda's captain was ordered to stop by any means an eventual annexation of Panama by the United States. According to a U.S. publication in August 1885, right after the Panama events, "[The Esmeralda] could destroy our whole navy, ship by ship and never be touched once."

After navy visits to Easter Island in 1875 and 1887, Chilean navy officer Policarpo Toro managed to negotiate an incorporation of the island into Chile with native Rapanui in 1888. By occupying Easter Island, Chile joined the imperial nations. By 1900 nearly all Pacific islands were in control of Britain, France, United States, Germany, Japan, and Chile.

=== Polynesian trade and annexation of Easter Island ===
In Oceania, France gained a leading position as imperial power after making Tahiti and New Caledonia protectorates in 1842 and 1853 respectively.

Chile's interest in expanding into the islands of the Pacific Ocean dates to the presidency of José Joaquín Prieto (1831–1841) and the ideology of Diego Portales, who considered that Chile's expansion into Polynesia was a natural consequence of its maritime destiny. (Note: According to economist Neantro Saavedra-Rivano: "Of all Latin American countries, Chile has been the most explicit and consistent throughout its history in expressing its vocation as a Pacific nation and acting in accordance with this conception.") Nonetheless, the first stage of the country's expansionism into the Pacific began only a decade later, in 1851, when—in response to an American incursion into the Juan Fernández Islands—Chile's government formally organized the islands into a subdelegation of Valparaíso. That same year, Chile's economic interest in the Pacific were renewed after its merchant fleet briefly succeeded in creating an agricultural goods exchange market that connected the Californian port of San Francisco with Australia. By 1861, Chile had established a lucrative enterprise across the Pacific, its national currency abundantly circulating throughout Polynesia and its merchants trading in the markets of Tahiti, New Zealand, Tasmania, Shanghai; negotiations were also made with the Spanish Philippines, and altercations reportedly occurred between Chilean and American whalers in the Sea of Japan.This period ended as a result of the Chilean merchant fleet's destruction by Spanish forces in 1866, during the Chincha Islands War.

Chile's Polynesian aspirations would again be awakened in the aftermath of the country's decisive victory against Peru in the War of the Pacific, which left the Chilean fleet as the dominant maritime force in the Pacific coast of the Americas. Valparaíso had also become the most important port in the Pacific coast of South America, providing Chilean merchants with the capacity to find markets in the Pacific for its new mineral wealth acquired from the Atacama. During this period, the Chilean intellectual and politician Benjamín Vicuña Mackenna (who served as senator in the National Congress from 1876 to 1885) was an influential voice in favor of Chilean expansionism into the Pacific—he considered that Spain's discoveries in the Pacific had been stolen by the British, and envisioned that Chile's duty was to create an empire in the Pacific that would reach Asia. In the context of this imperialist fervor is that, in 1886, Captain Policarpo Toro of the Chilean Navy proposed to his superiors the annexation of Easter Island; a proposal which was supported by President José Manuel Balmaceda because of the island's apparent strategic location and economic value. After Toro transferred the rights to the island's sheep ranching operations from Tahiti-based businesses to the Chilean-based Williamson-Balfour Company in 1887, Easter Island's annexation process was culminated with the signing of the "Agreement of Wills" between Rapa Nui chieftains and Toro, in name of the Chilean government, in 1888. By occupying Easter Island, Chile joined the imperial nations.

By 1900 nearly all Oceania islands were in control of Britain, France, United States, Germany, Japan, Mexico, Ecuador and Chile.

=== 1960 tsunami ===
On May 22, 1960 the Chilean coast from Mocha Island (38° S)and to Aysén Region (45° S) was devastated by a tsunami triggered by the 1960 Valdivia earthquake. Further north the port of Talcahuano did not suffered any mayor damages, only some flooding. Some tugboats and small sailboats stranded on Rocuant Island.

The small port of Bahía Mansa had all of its new infrastructure destroyed by the tsunami that reached heights of up to 10 m.a.s.l. in that place. The boat Isabella that at was at time in the port lost its anchors.

In Valdivia River and Corral Bay several vessels wrecked due to the earthquake among them Argentina, Canelos, Carlos Haverbeck, Melita and the salvaged remnants of Penco. Canelos was anchored at Corral and filling a cargo of wood and other products destined to northern Chile when the quake struck. Canelos engine was warmed up in view of this events. After hours of drifting around in Corral Bay and Valdivia River the ship wrecked and was abandoned by its crew at 18.00 PM. Two men on board of Canelos died. As of 2000 the remnants of Canelos are still visible. Santiago, another ship anchored at Corral by the time of the quake, managed to leave Corral in a bad state but wrecked off the coast of Mocha Island on May 24.

== See also ==
- List of shipyards in Chile
- Chilean Sea
- Climate of Chile
- Fishing in Chile
