= Langkat Regency =

Regency in North Sumatra, Indonesia

Langkat Regency Kabupaten Langkat
- Regency

Other transcription(s)
  - Jawi: لڠكت
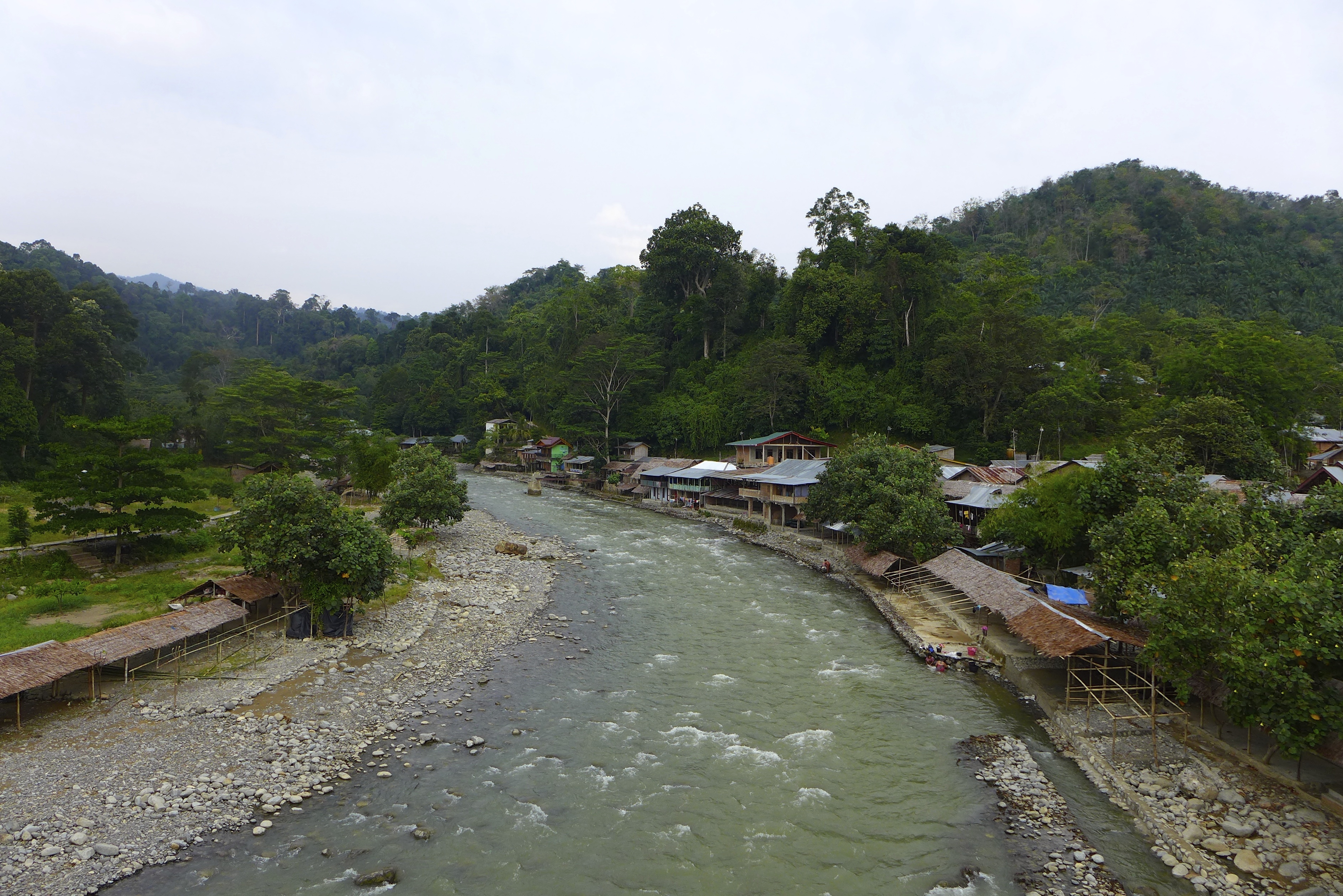
- Panorama of Bukit Lawang

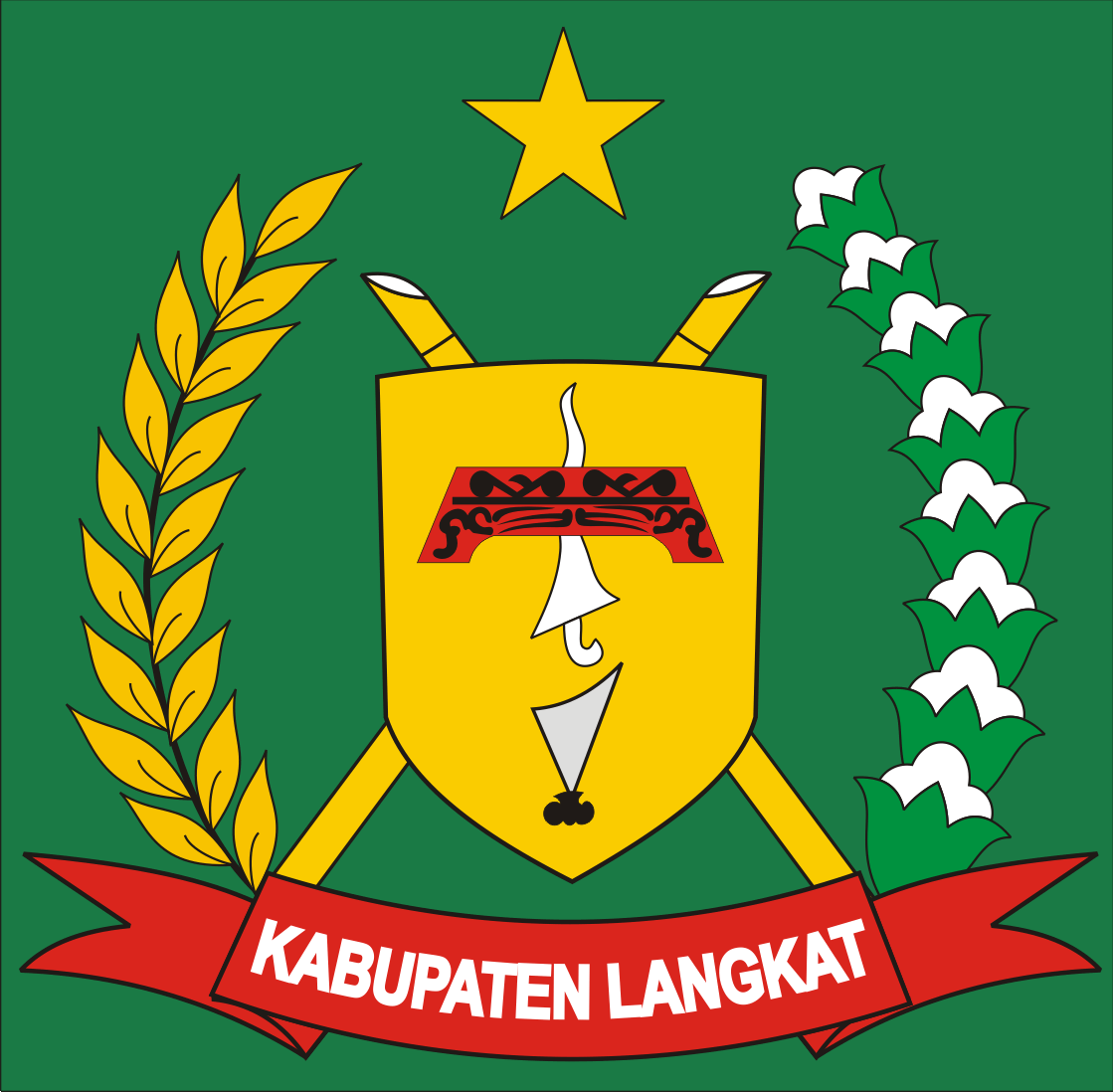
- Coat of arms

- Coordinates: 3°46′N 98°13′E
- Country: Indonesia
- Province: North Sumatra
- Regency seat: Stabat

Government
  - Regent: Syah Afandin
  - Vice Regent: Tiorita Surbakti
  - Chairman of Regency's Council of Representatives: Surialam (Golkar)
  - Vice Chairmen of Regency's Council of Representatives: Donny Setha (Gerindra), Ralin Sinulingga (PDI-P) and Antoni Ginting (National Mandate Party)

Area
  - Total: 6,283.29 km^{2} (2,425.99 sq mi)

Population (mid 2025 estimate)
  - Total: 1,089,969
  - Density: 173.471/km^{2} (449.288/sq mi)
- Time zone: UTC+7 (WIB)
- Website: www.langkatkab.go.id

Langkat Regency (Indonesian: Kabupaten Langkat) is the northernmost regency of North Sumatra Province in Indonesia. Its administrative centre is the town of Stabat. It has a land area of 6,263.29 km^{2} and its population was 967,535 at the 2010 Census and 1,030,202 at the 2020 Census; the official estimate as of mid 2025 was 1,089,969 (comprising 550,151 males and 539,818 females). Its population is roughly equivalent to that of Djibouti.

Immediately to the south is Karo Regency, to the east is Deli Serdang Regency (which surrounds the city of Medan) and the city of Binjai (formerly part of Langkat Regency), to the northeast lies the Strait of Malacca and to the west lies Aceh Province.

== Administrative districts ==
Langkat Regency is divided into twenty-three administrative districts (Indonesian: kecamatan), tabulated below with their areas and their populations at the 2010 Census and the 2020 Census, together with the official estimates as of mid 2025. The table also includes the locations of the district administrative centres, the number of administrative villages in each district (totaling 240 rural desa and 37 urban kelurahan), and its post code.

Kode Wilayah	Name of District (kecamatan)	Area in km^{2}	Pop'n Census 2010	Pop'n Census 2020	Pop'n Estimate mid 2025	Admin centre	No. of kelu- rahan	No. of desa	Post code
12.05.01	Bahorok	1,101.83	39,851	41,570	43,448	Pekan Bahorok	1	18	20774
12.05.21	Sirapit	98.50	15,908	16,703	17,513	Sidorejo	-	10	20775
12.05.02	Salapian	221.73	25,924	26,238	27,025	Minta Kasih	1	16	20777
12.05.22	Kutambaru	236.84	13,425	14,109	14,800	Kutambaru	-	8	20773
12.05.04	Sei Bingai	333.17	48,346	51,617	54,559	Namu Ukur	1	15	20771
12.05.03	Kuala	206.23	39,125	40,327	41,905	Pekan Kuala	2	14	20772
12.05.06	Selesai	167.73	69,324	72,595	77,938	Pekan Selesai	1	13	20762
12.05.05	Binjai ^{(a)}	42.05	42,325	47,018	50,654	Kuala Begumit	1	6	20761
12.05.07	Stabat	108.85	81,971	91,153	98,252	Stabat Binjai	6 ^{(b)}	6	20811: 20816
12.05.08	Wampu	194.21	40,612	42,388	44,315	Bingai	1	13	20851
12.05.19	Batang Serangan	899.38	35,019	35,764	36,998	Pekan Batang Serangan	1	7	20852
12.05.20	Sawit Seberang	209.10	25,197	25,765	26,670	Pekan Sawit Seberang	1	6	20811
12.05.12	Padang Tualang	221.14	46,687	52,895	57,552	Tanjung Selamat	1	11	20850
12.05.10	Hinai	105.26	47,843	52,664	56,484	Kebun Lada	1	12	20854
12.05.09	Secanggang	231.19	65,349	70,482	74,865	Hinai Kiri	1	16	20855
12.05.11	Tanjung Pura	179.61	64,412	69,018	73,078	Pekan Tanjung Pura	1	18	20853
12.05.13	Gebang ^{(c)}	178.49	42,587	47,509	51,284	Pekan Gebang	1	10	20856
12.05.14	Babalan	76.41	56,456	56,706	58,185	Pelawi Utara	4 ^{(d)}	4	20857
12.05.17	Sei Lepan	280.68	46,810	49,630	52,282	Alor Dua	5 ^{(e)}	9	20776
12.05.18	Brandan Barat (West Brandan)	89.80	21,905	24,398	25,727	Tangkahan Durian	2	5	20881
12.05.16	Besitang	720.74	43,958	45,286	47,051	Pekan Besitang	3 ^{(f)}	6	20859
12.05.15	Pangkalan Susu^{(g)}	151.35	41,512	43,873	46,146	Bukit Petai	2	9	20858
12.05.23	Pematang Jaya	209.00	12,992	12,869	13,238	Limau Mungkur	-	8	20858: 20859
	Totals	6,263.29	967,535	1,030,202	1,089,969		37	240	

Notes: (a) adjacent to, but not part of Binjai city. (b) the kelurahan of Dendang, Kwala Bingai, Paya Mabar, Perdamaian, Sidomulyo and Stabat Baru.
(c) includes the offshore island of Pulau Selingkar. (d) the kelurahan of Brandan Barat, Brandan Timur, Brandan Timur Baru and Pelawi Utara.
(e) the kelurahan of Alur Dua, Alur Dua Baru, Harapan Jaya, Sei Bilah Barat and Sei Bilah Timur. (f) the kelirahan of Bukit Kubu, Kampung Lama and Pekan Besitang.
(g) includes the offshore islands of Pulau Kampai, Pulau Panjang, Pulau Rawa and Pulau Sembilan.
