= Hinai =

- District
- Interactive map of Hinai
- Coordinates: 3°49′48.05″N 98°25′32.6″E
- Country: Indonesia
- Province: North Sumatra
- Regency: Langkat Regency

Area
  - Total: 105.26 km^{2} (40.64 sq mi)

Population (2024)
  - Total: 57.688
  - Density: 0.54805/km^{2} (1.4194/sq mi)
- Time zone: UTC+7 (Western Indonesia Time)
- Postal code: 20854

Hinai is an administrative district (kecamatan) in Langkat Regency, North Sumatra Province, Indonesia.
