= Kutambaru =

- District
- Interactive map of Kutambaru
- Coordinates: 3°23′36.2″N 98°15′25.4″E
- Country: Indonesia
- Province: North Sumatra
- Regency: Langkat Regency
- District seat: Kutambaru

Area
  - Total: 236.84 km^{2} (91.44 sq mi)

Population (2020)
  - Total: 14,109
  - Density: 59.572/km^{2} (154.29/sq mi)
- Time zone: UTC+7 (Western Indonesia Time)
- Postal code: 20773

Kutambaru is a district of Langkat Regency, North Sumatra Province, Indonesia. In 2020, it was inhabited by 14,109 people, and had a total area of 236.84 km^{2}.

== Governance ==
=== Villages ===
Kutambaru consists of eight villages (desa):

Regional Code	Name	Area (km²)	Population (2023)	Hamlets (Dusun)
12.05.22.2001	Namotogan	11.13	3,121	10
12.05.22.2002	Kutagajah	8.54	2,439	10
12.05.22.2003	Perkebunan Marike	17.72	1,548	6
12.05.22.2004	Kaperas	82.98	722	5
12.05.22.2005	Namoteras	11.25	1,389	13
12.05.22.2006	Rampah	53.04	1,324	14
12.05.22.2007	Sulkam	47.61	605	6
12.05.22.2008	Kutambaru	4.56	3,493	16
12.05.22	Totals	236.83	14,641	80
