= List of shipyards in Chile =

== War of the Pacific ==
In order to support amphibious operations during the landing in Pisagua by carrying significant quantities of cargo, and landing troops directly onto an unimproved shore, the Government built flat-bottomed landing craft, called Chalanas. They transported 1,200 men in the first landing and took onboard 600 men in less than 2 hours for the second landing.

== ASMAR ==
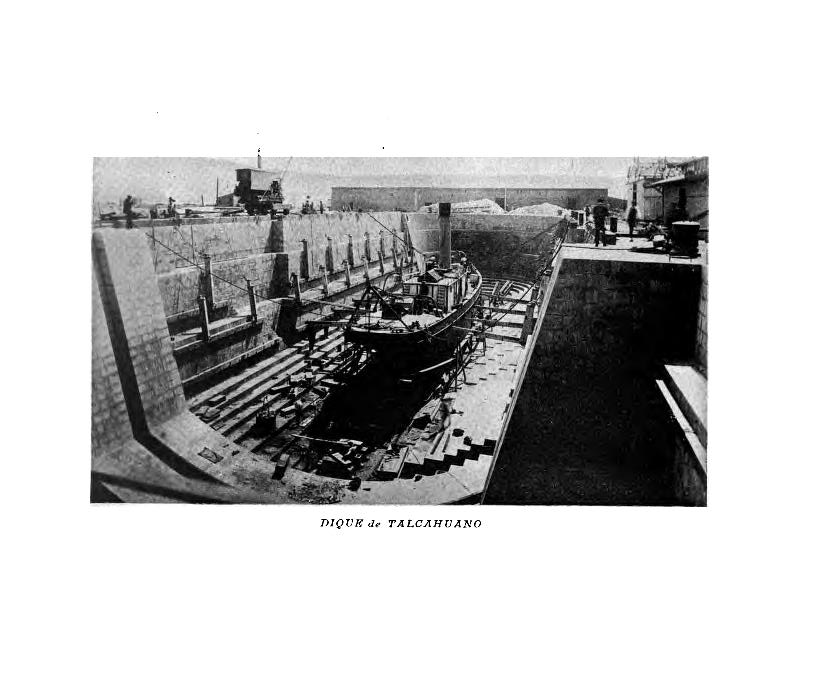
Dock in Talcahuano

ASMAR or Astilleros y Maestranzas de la Armada is a Chilean state-owned shipyard service dealing both with military and civilian vessels.

- Cirujano Videla (1964)
- Fuentealba (1966)
- Odger (1966)
- Castor (1968)
- Papudo (1970)
- Maipo (1981)

== Lever, Murphy & Co. ==
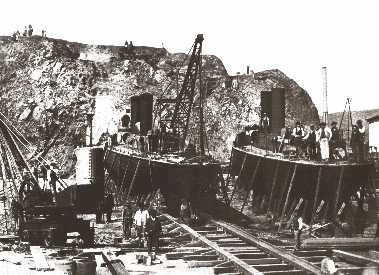
Shipyard in Caleta Abarca, Viña del Mar, 1898

Located in Caleta de la Barca, (today Caleta Abarca), this shipyard registers works:

- 1885, install 4 new boilers in Huáscar (ship)
- Meteoro (1901)
- 1898 assembled the parts built by Yarrow Shipbuilders of: Contreras (1896), Mutilla (1896), Rodriguez (1896) and Thomson (1896).

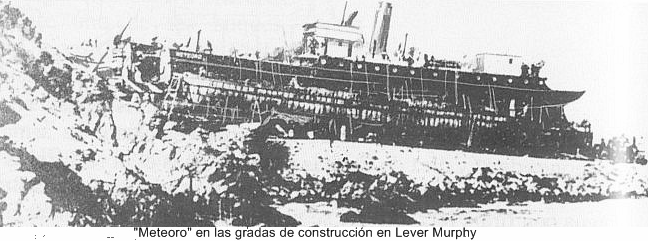
Building of Meteoro

== Alberto Daiber Shipyard ==
Located in Valdivia, Chile

- Huemul (1935)
- Águila (1941)
- Brito (1935)

== Behrens Shipyard, Valdivia ==
- Pisagua (1904)
- Valdivia (1903)

== Duprat Shipyard ==
1845 in Valparaíso

- Ancud (1853)
- Constitución (1851)
- María Susana

== Las Habas Shipyard ==
Located in Valparíso

- Ortiz (1957)

== MARCO Chilena ==
MARCO is a company founded in Iquique, dedicated to construction, repair, and rebuild of steel vessels of up to 95M Length overall. The shipyard also offers consulting and engineering work services.

- Brito (1966)

== Oettinger Shipyard ==
Located in Valdivia

- Isleña (1938)

== See also ==
- Maritime history of Chile
