= Wampu =

- District
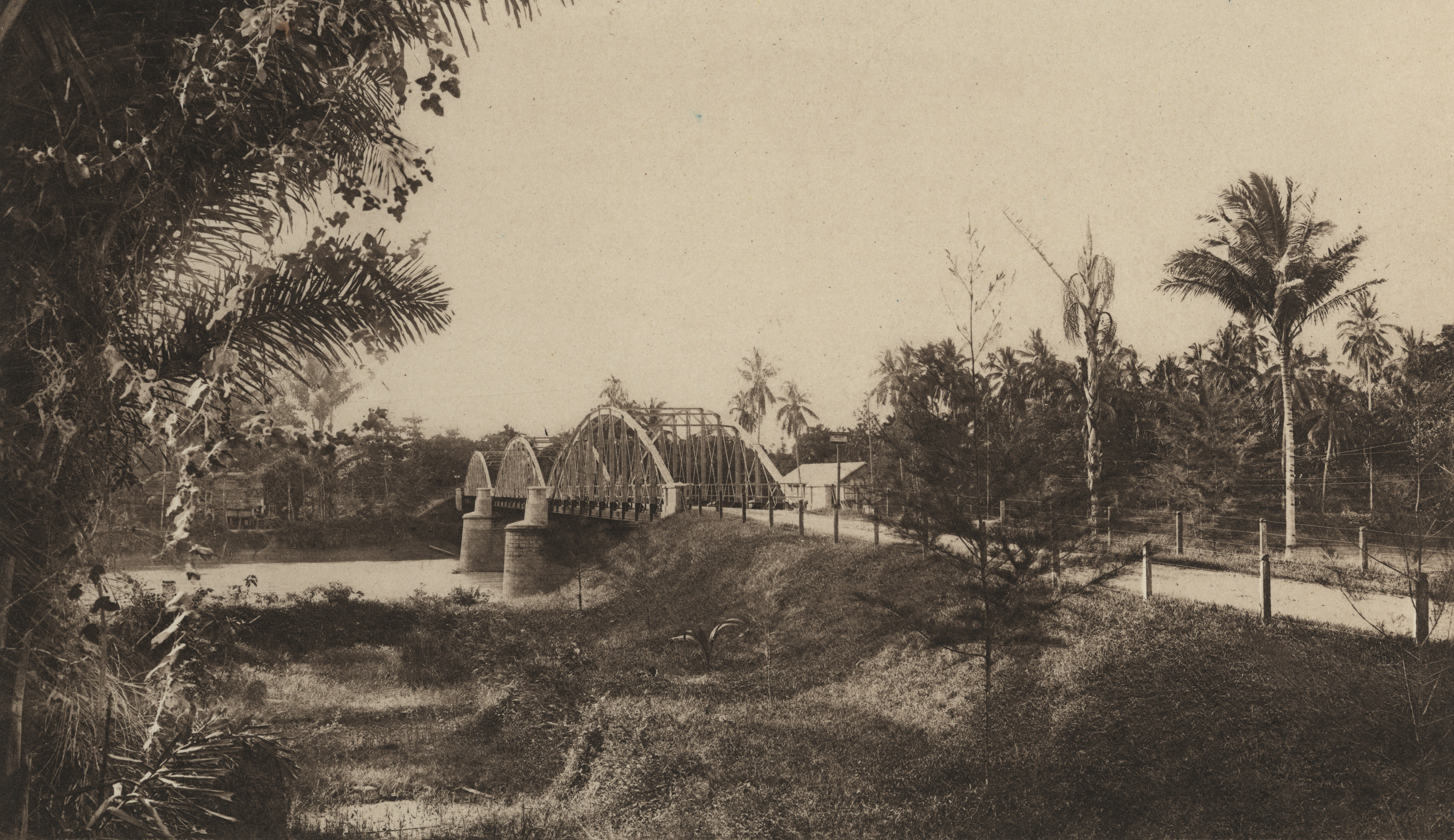
- Bridge over the Wampu River near the Kwala Bingei plantation owned by the Deli Company (1905)
- Interactive map of Wampu
- Location in Sumatra and Indonesia Wampu (Sumatra) Wampu (Indonesia)
- Coordinates: 3°44′5.7″N 98°22′55.3″E
- Country: Indonesia
- Province: North Sumatra
- Regency: Langkat
- Established: 24 November 1956
- District seat: Bingai

Area
  - Total: 194.21 km^{2} (74.98 sq mi)

Population (2020)
  - Total: 42,388
  - Density: 218.26/km^{2} (565.29/sq mi)
- Time zone: UTC+7 (IWT)
- Regional code: 12.05.08
- Villages: 14

Wampu is a district of Langkat Regency, North Sumatra Province, Indonesia. In 2020, it was inhabited by 42,388 people, and had a total area of 194.21 km^{2}.

== Governance ==
=== Villages ===
Wampu consists of one urban village (kelurahan) and thirteen rural villages (desa). The kelurahan is marked by a grey background:

| Regional code | Name | Area (km²) | Population (2023) | Hamlets (dusun) |
|---|---|---|---|---|
| 12.05.08.1001 | Bingai | 7.01 | 6,375 | – |
| 12.05.08.2002 | Gohor Lama | 6.37 | 1,122 | 10 |
| 12.05.08.2003 | Stabat Lama | 33.09 | 6,311 | 10 |
| 12.05.08.2004 | Besilam Bukit Lembasa | 65.39 | 2,326 | 14 |
| 12.05.08.2005 | Kebun Balok | 7.96 | 3,770 | 9 |
| 12.05.08.2006 | Bukit Melintang | 14.84 | 3,543 | 4 |
| 12.05.08.2007 | Gergas | 14.76 | 2,867 | 4 |
| 12.05.08.2008 | West Stabat Lama | 6.17 | 1,948 | 12 |
| 12.05.08.2009 | Sumber Mulyo | 3.07 | 621 | 6 |
| 12.05.08.2010 | Pertumbukan | 4.25 | 2,167 | 6 |
| 12.05.08.2011 | Paya Tusam | 6.42 | 1,874 | 6 |
| 12.05.08.2012 | Mekar Jaya | 16.89 | 3,513 | 8 |
| 12.05.08.2013 | Jentera Stabat | 2.91 | 5,143 | 10 |
| 12.05.08.2014 | Stungkit | 5.08 | 3,572 | 8 |
| 12.05.08 | Totals | 194.21 | 45,152 | 109 |
