= Batang Serangan =

- District
- Interactive map of Batang Serangan
- Coordinates: 3.7571°N 98.2573°E
- Country: Indonesia
- Province: North Sumatra
- Regency: Langkat Regency

Area
  - Total: 899.38 km^{2} (347.25 sq mi)

Population (2023)
  - Total: 36,537
  - Density: 40.625/km^{2} (105.22/sq mi)
- Time zone: UTC+7 (Western Indonesia Time)
- Postal code: 20852

Batang Serangan is an administrative district (kecamatan) in Langkat Regency, North Sumatra Province, Indonesia.
