= Selesai =

- District
- Interactive map of Selesai
- Coordinates: 3°36′18″N 98°28′41″E
- Country: Indonesia
- Province: North Sumatra
- Regency: Langkat Regency

Area
  - Total: 167.73 km^{2} (64.76 sq mi)

Population (mid 2025 estimate)
  - Total: 77,938
  - Density: 464.66/km^{2} (1,203.5/sq mi)
- Time zone: UTC+7 (Western Indonesia Time)
- Postal code: 20762

Selesai is an administrative district (kecamatan) in Langkat Regency, North Sumatra Province, Indonesia. This district borders directly on both Binjai City and Binjai District (of the regency) to the east, and on Stabat District to the north.
