= Binjai =

City in North Sumatra, Indonesia

- City
- City of Binjai; Kota Binjai

Other transcription(s)
  - Jawi: بينجاي
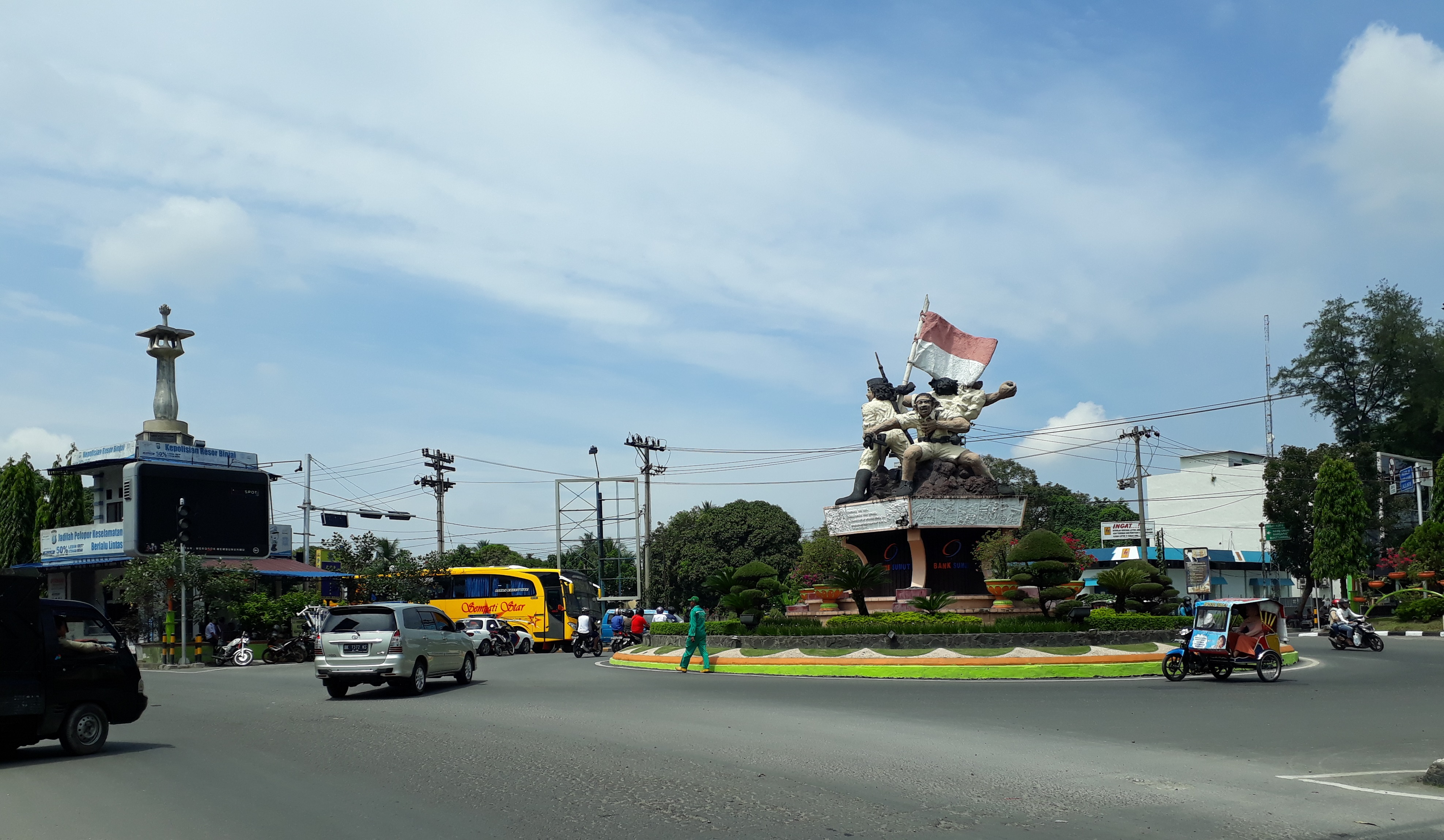
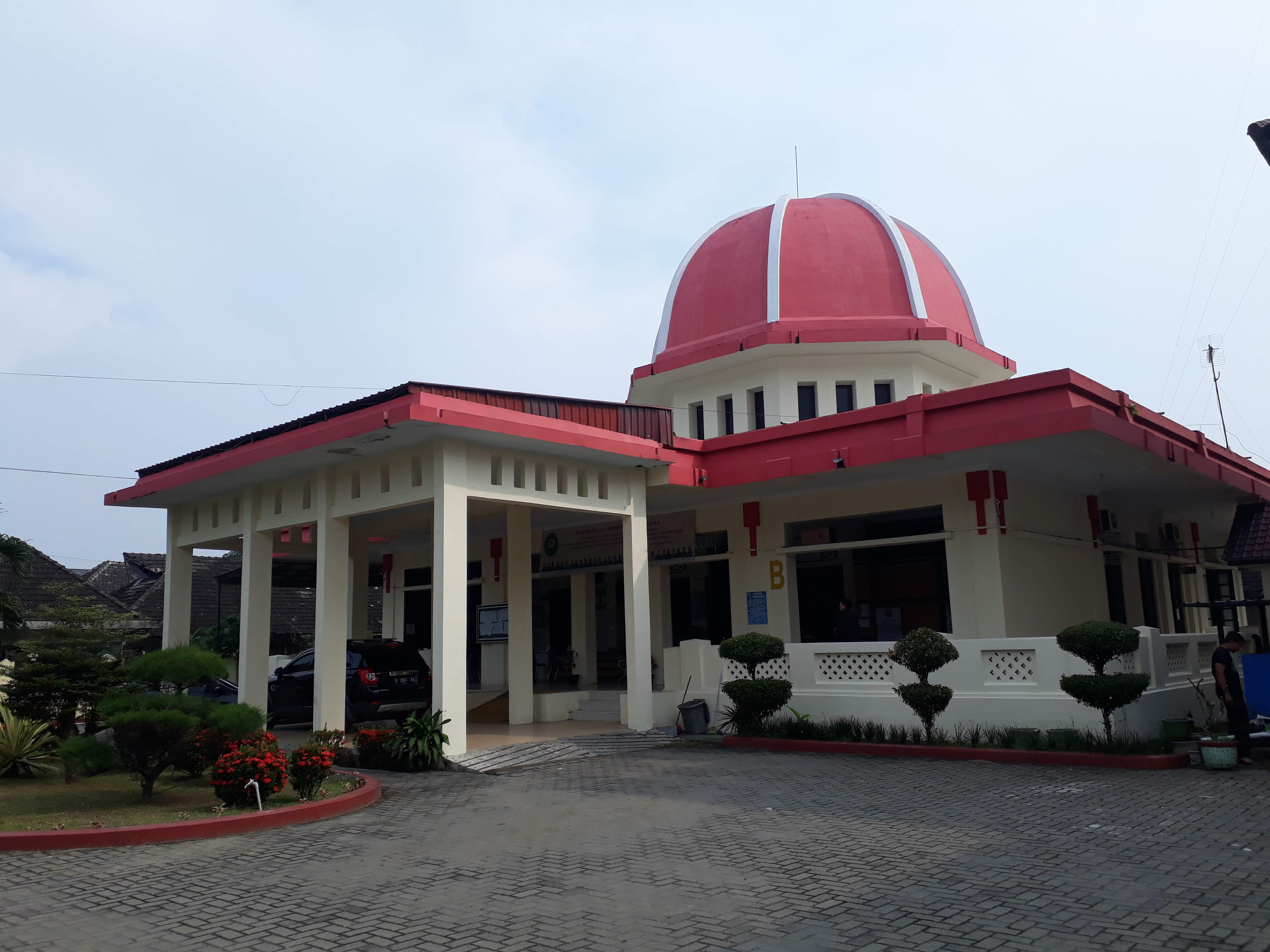
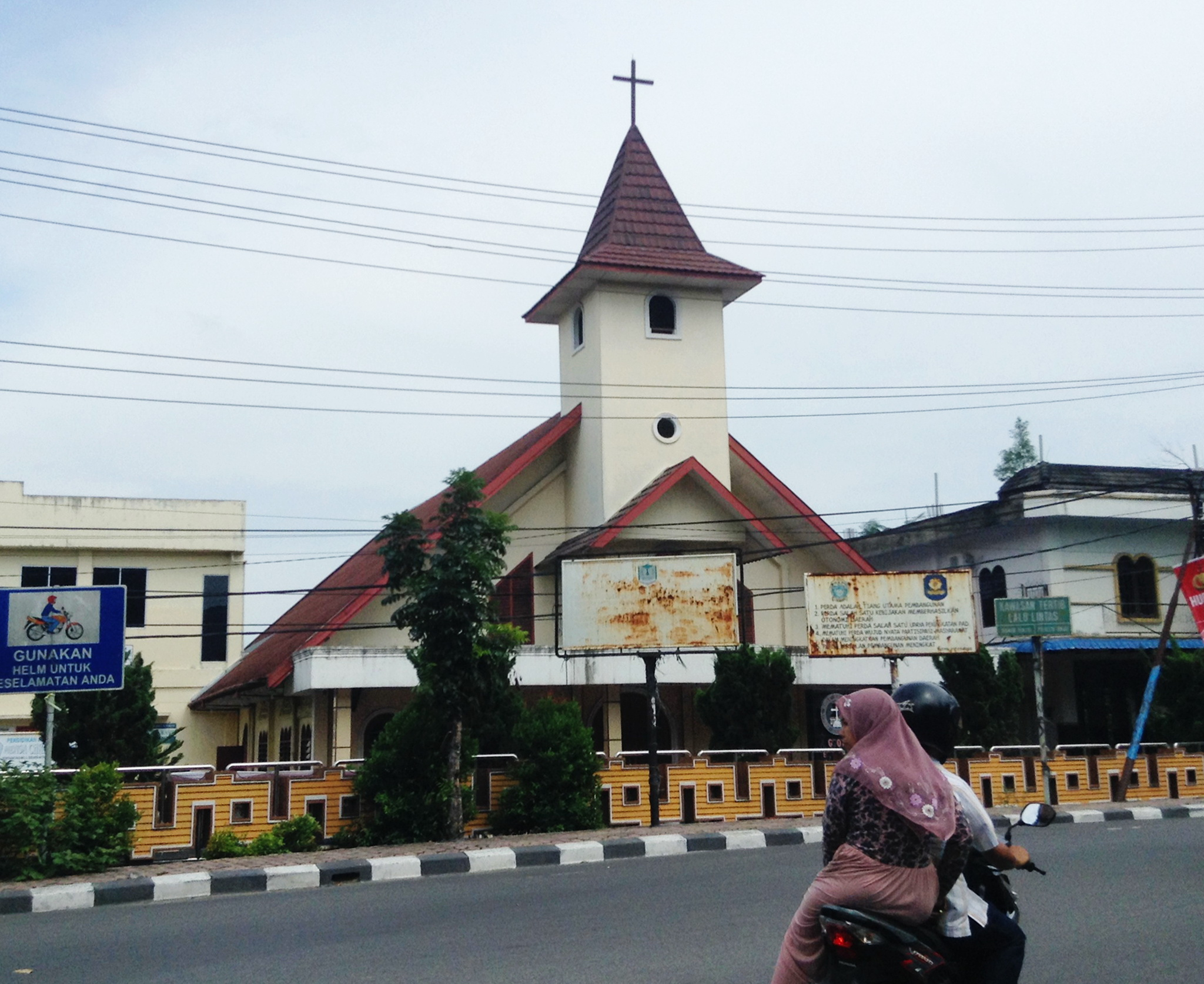
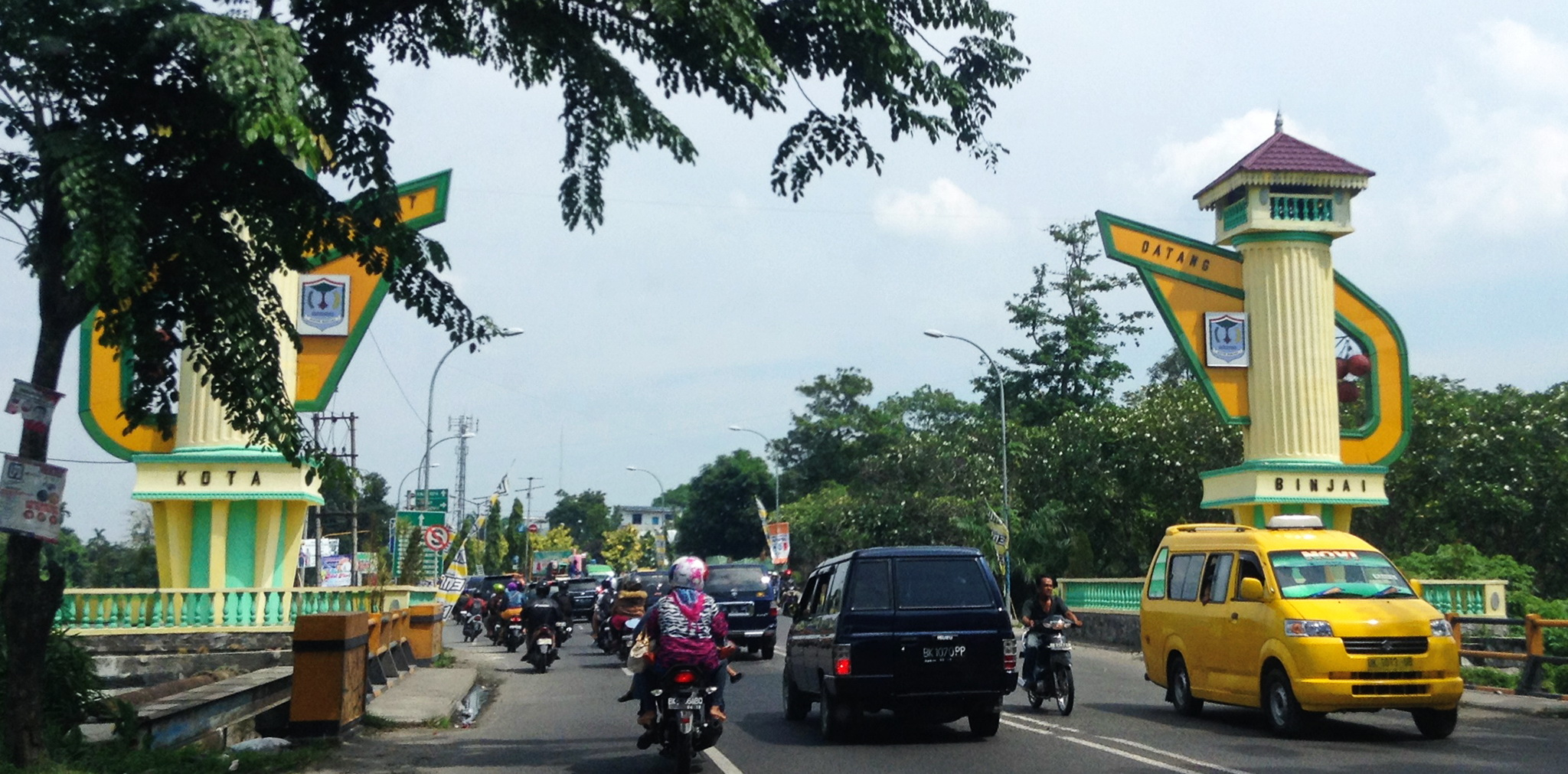
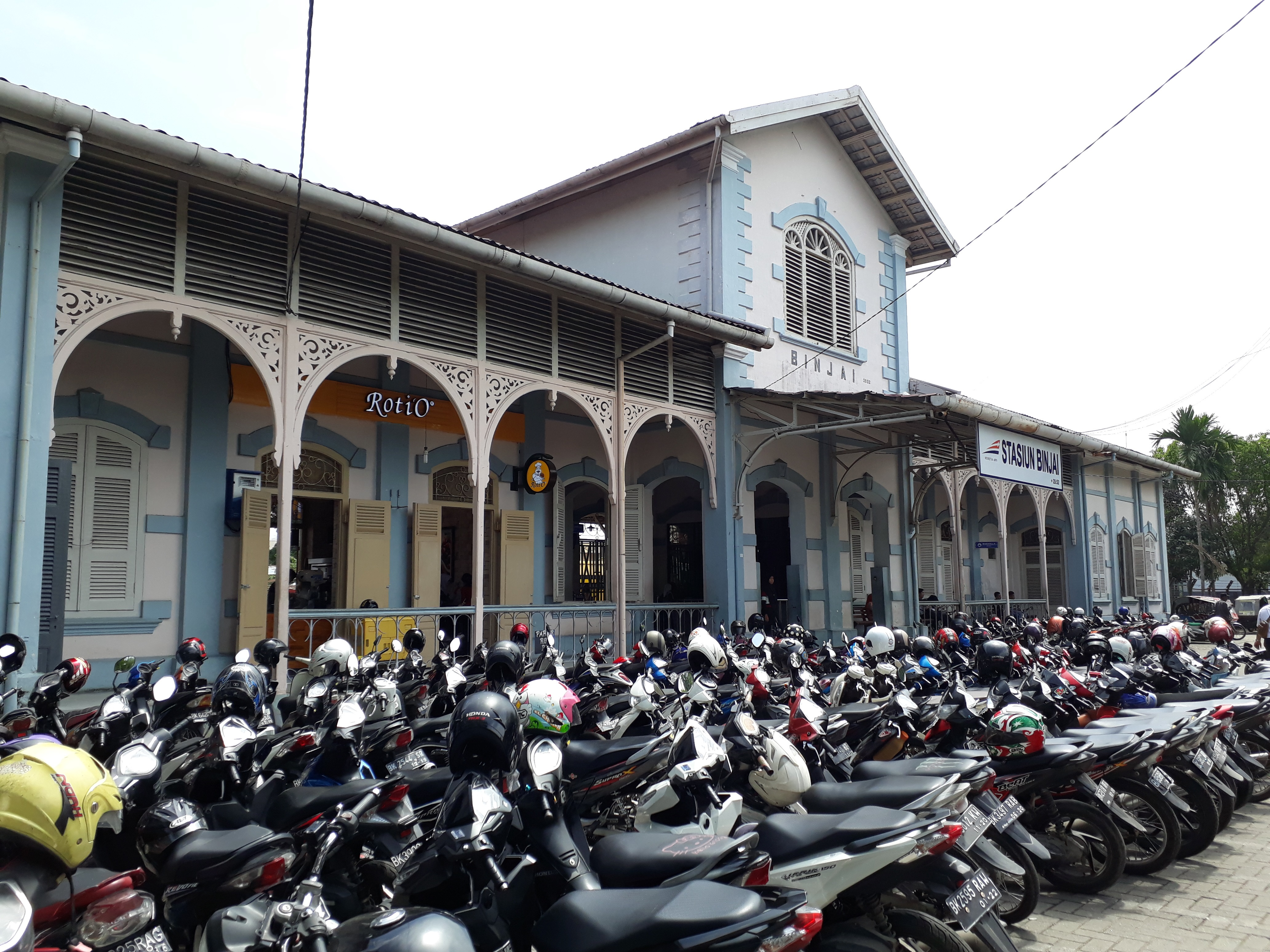
- 1945 Struggle Monument Amir Hamzah's house GBKP Simpang Awas Binjai Welcome gate to Binjai Binjai station

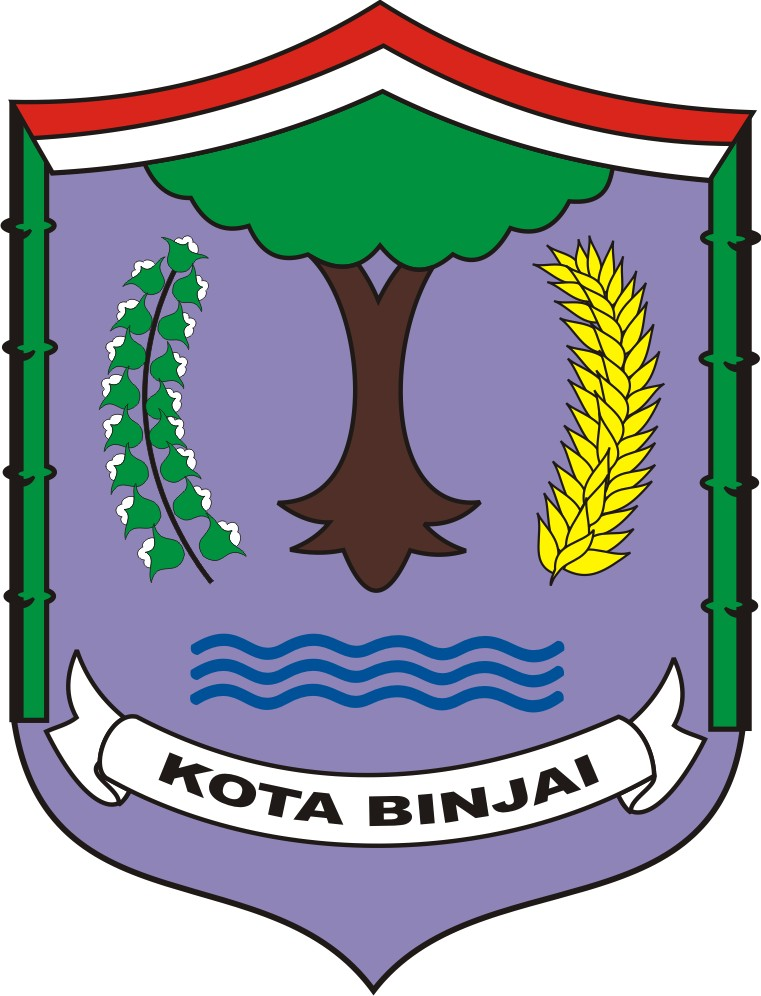
- Coat of arms

- Location within North Sumatra

- Location in Sumatra and Indonesia Binjai (Indonesia)
- Coordinates: 3°35′55″N 98°28′49″E
- Country: Indonesia
- Province: North Sumatra
- Metropolitan area: Mebidangro

Government
  - Mayor: Amir Hamzah
  - Vice Mayor: Hasanul Jihadi
  - Chairman of City's Council of Representatives: H Noor Sri Alam Syah Putra (Golkar)
  - Vice Chairmen of City's Council of Representatives: Ahmad Azrai Azis (Gerindra) and M Syarif Sitepu (PDI-P)

Area
  - Total: 90.45 km^{2} (34.92 sq mi)
- Elevation: 28 m (92 ft)

Population (mid 2025 estimate)
  - Total: 310,932
  - Density: 3,438/km^{2} (8,903/sq mi)
- Time zone: UTC+7 (Indonesia Western Time)
- Area code: (+62) 61
- Website: www.binjaikota.go.id

Binjai (English: /biːnˌdʒaɪ/ or BEEN-jayh, Jawi: بينجاي), formally Kota Binjai (Binjai City), is an independent city in the North Sumatra province of Indonesia, bordered by Deli Serdang Regency to the east and Langkat Regency to the west. Binjai is connected to Medan (the provincial capital), about 22 km to the east, by the Sumatra highway that goes to Banda Aceh, and effectively forms a part of Greater Medan. The city's population was 181,904 in the 1990 Census, 224,516 in the 2000 Census, 246,154 in the 2010 Census, and 291,842 in the 2020 Census; the official estimate as of mid 2025 was 310,932 (comprising 155,462 males and 155,470 females). In mid 2025, 50,654 inhabitants lived in the Binjai District of Langkat Regency, outside the city limits but immediately north of the city.

== History ==
The origin of Binjai when it established itself as a city is unknown. Historically, the Binjai area was situated between two Malay kingdoms, Deli and Langkat. Binjai grew from a small village on the edge of the Bingai River.

According to oral and written accounts of the area's history, the city of Binjai grew from a small village on the edge of the Bingai River, approximately where the Pekan Binjai village is today. Traditional ceremonies were held to lay the foundations of the small village in the shade of a large binjai tree at the edge of the Bingai River, which flows into the Wampu River, which is navigable for a large portion of its length.

Around the tree were built several houses, which were gradually enlarged, until finally a village hall was built. A lively port also developed, visited by barges from Stabat, Tanjung Pura, and the Strait of Malacca. Over time, the Binjai tree gave its name to the growing city.

== Geography ==
Binjai is located between the Mencirim, Bangkatan, and Bingai rivers. On average, it is 28m above sea level. As the crow flies, Binjai is only 8 km from Medan, although Kabupaten Deli Serdang separates the two. However, the route of the Sumatara Highway increases the effective distance between the two cities to 22 km.

The two nearby rivers, the Bingai and Mencirim Rivers satisfy the needs of the city for clean water, which is distributed by the local water company. However, many people rely on wells for their water supply.

== Climate ==
Binjai has a tropical rainforest climate (Af) with heavy rainfall year-round.

Climate data for Binjai
Month	Jan	Feb	Mar	Apr	May	Jun	Jul	Aug	Sep	Oct	Nov	Dec	Year
Mean daily maximum °C (°F)	30.7 (87.3)	31.5 (88.7)	32.1 (89.8)	32.3 (90.1)	32.5 (90.5)	32.6 (90.7)	32.3 (90.1)	32.1 (89.8)	31.4 (88.5)	31.1 (88.0)	30.6 (87.1)	30.4 (86.7)	31.6 (88.9)
Daily mean °C (°F)	26.0 (78.8)	26.4 (79.5)	26.9 (80.4)	27.2 (81.0)	27.4 (81.3)	27.3 (81.1)	27.0 (80.6)	26.9 (80.4)	26.7 (80.1)	26.7 (80.1)	26.2 (79.2)	26.0 (78.8)	26.7 (80.1)
Mean daily minimum °C (°F)	21.4 (70.5)	21.4 (70.5)	21.7 (71.1)	22.2 (72.0)	22.4 (72.3)	22.0 (71.6)	21.7 (71.1)	21.8 (71.2)	22.1 (71.8)	22.3 (72.1)	21.9 (71.4)	21.7 (71.1)	21.9 (71.4)
Average rainfall mm (inches)	135 (5.3)	107 (4.2)	122 (4.8)	168 (6.6)	207 (8.1)	151 (5.9)	168 (6.6)	193 (7.6)	255 (10.0)	295 (11.6)	274 (10.8)	221 (8.7)	2,296 (90.2)
Source: Climate-Data.org

== Government ==
Binjai City is divided into five districts (kecamatan), which are further divided into 37 villages (kelurahan).

The mayoral office is located in the Town Hall, at General Sudirman Road No. 6. In 2009, Muhammad Idhaham, Msi was elected to this position from 2009 to 2014.

Formerly, Binjai was the location for the headquarters of the Langkat Police Force, which had responsibility for policing both the city of Binjai and Kabupaten Langkat. However, in 2001 the police force was split, with the creation of a Binjai police force, while the headquarters for the Langkat Police Force moved to Stabat.

Directly in front of the town hall is the Lapangan merdeka (Freedom Square), a civic open space, as well as the Pendopo Umar Baki, a building used for a variety of official and unofficial functions.

=== Administrative districts ===
The city of Binjai is divided into five administrative districts (Indonesian: kecamatan), tabulated below with their areas and their populations at the 2010 Census and the 2020 Census, together with the official estimates as of mid 2025. The table also includes the number of administrative villages (all classed as urban kelurahan) in each district and its postcodes.

Kode Wilayah	Name of District (kecamatan)	Area in km^{2}	Pop'n Census 2010	Pop'n Census 2020	Pop'n Estimate mid 2025	No. of villages	Post codes
12.75.05	Binjai Selatan (South Binjai)	29.96	48,423	58,341	62,612	8	20721: 20728
12.75.02	Binjai Kota (Downtown Binjai)	4.12	30,190	32,209	32,592	7	20711: 20715
12.75.04	Binjai Timur (East Binjai)	21.92	53,926	65,393	70,388	7	20731: 20737
12.75.01	Binjai Utara (North Binjai)	23.59	70,392	84,693	90,832	9	20741: 20749
12.75.03	Binjai Barat (West Binjai)	10.86	43,223	51,206	54,508	6	20716: 20719
	Total city	90.45	246,154	291,842	307,170	37	
12.05.05	Binjai District ^{(a)}	42.05	42,325	47,018	50,654	7	20761
12.05.06	Selesai District ^{(a)}	167.73	69,321	72,595	77,938	14	20762

Note: (a) mainly suburban districts of Langkat Regency, outside the city's administrative boundaries. The component villages of each comprise one urban kelurahan and a number of rural desa.

== Demographics ==
Binjai is a multi-ethnic city, with Javanese, Batak, Chinese, Indian, and Malay citizens. This complex ethnic mix gives Binjai a rich cultural and religious life. The total population for the city of Binjai was 291,842 in the 2020 Census, and the official estimate as of mid 2025 was 310,832. Along with Deli Serdang Regency, the city functions effectively as a commuter town for Medan.

The majority of the population is Muslim, mainly of Javanese and Malay origin. The largest mosque is located in Kapten Machmud Ismail Street. The Christian population is the next largest and is mainly made up of ethnic Chinese and Batak Christians, while the majority of Buddhists are of Chinese origin. There is one Hindu temple in Binjai, located on Ahmad Yani Street, and the Hindu population is mainly of Indian ethnicity, there is also a small community of Sikhs in the city.

== Economics and commerce ==
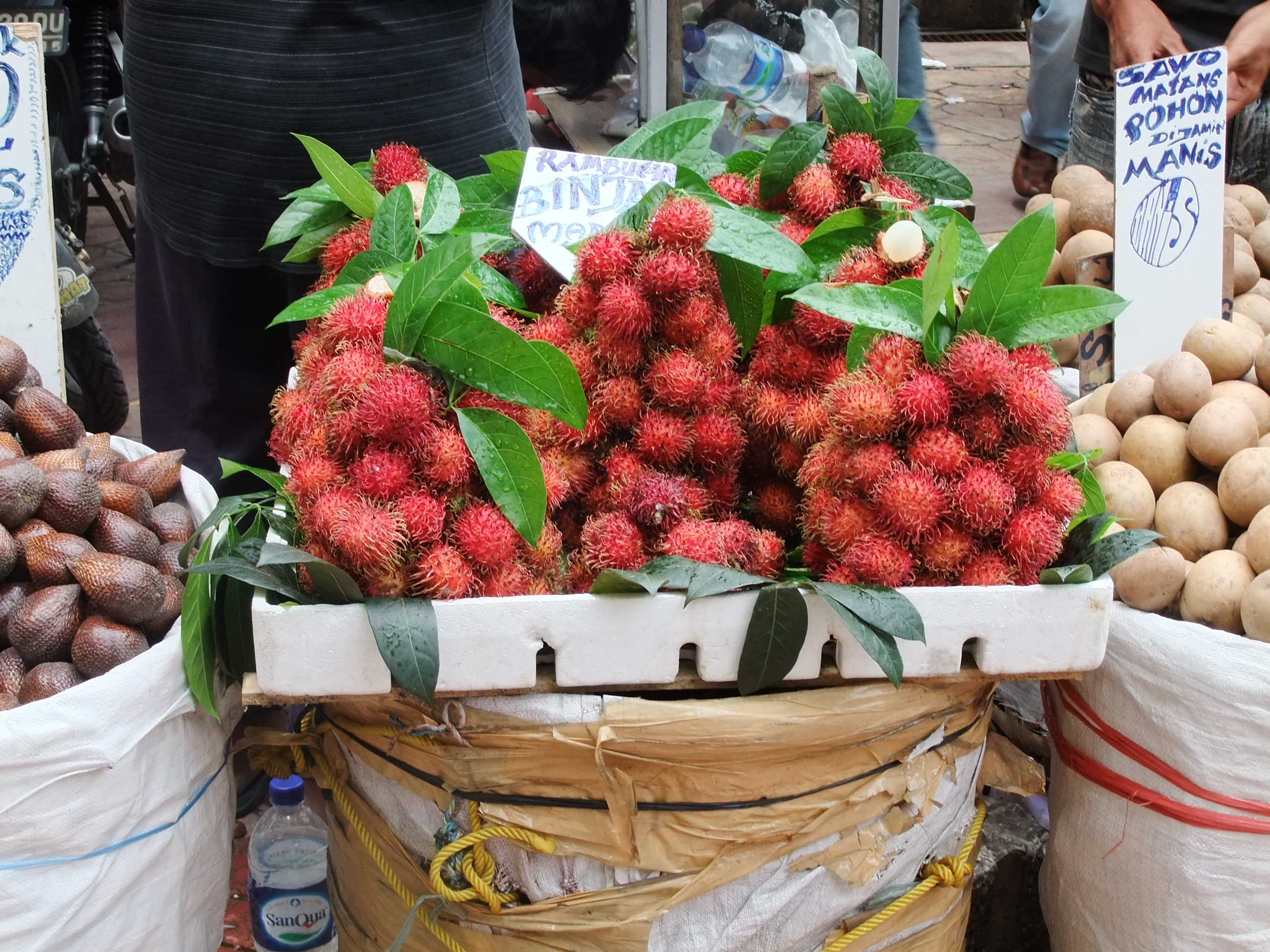
Rambutans from Binjai

The commercial centre is located in the heart of the city. The industrial area is in the north, while farming is concentrated in the east, south, and west of the city, with the west being the main area for animal husbandry. There is a 3 km^{2} business park in the Kelurahan Cengkeh Turi. There is also oil and gas exploration occurring in the Tandam Hilir region, to the north of the city.

In 1999, 29% of economic activity consisted of trade in goods and services, while the industrial sector contributed 23% of economic activity. The per capita income for Binjai was 3.3m rupiah, below the average for North Sumatra Province as a whole, which stood at 4.9m rupiah.

The most important agricultural sector is rambutan production, which covers 4.25 km^{2} with a production capacity of 2,400 tons per year. At present, the industry consists solely of the sale of fresh rambutan fruit; there is plenty of scopes to modernise this industry, for instance, by introducing canning processes and more sophisticated marketing.

There are four traditional markets in Binjai serving buyers and sellers from both Binjai and Kabupaten Langkat. These are: the Tavip, Kebun Lada, Brahrang, and Rambung markets. There are also several modern shopping centres, including Suzuya, Mini Market Tahiti, Toserba Ramayana, the Ramayana Mall, Asia King, and Binjai Supermall.

General Sudirman Street and Ahmad Yani Streets are the main shopping avenues, while the biggest and food court in Binjai is Bangkatan with Chinese and Indonesian food as specialties.

== Education ==
As at 2025, Binjai Municipality has 77 kindergarten Schools consisting of 4 public schools and 73 private schools, 171 elementary Schools consisting of 118 public schools and 53 private schools, 60 Junior High Schools consisting of 15 public schools and 45 private schools, 29 Senior Schools consisting of 7 public schools and 22 private schools, and 23 vocational High Schools consisting of 2 public schools and 21 private schools. There were also 8 universities (with 8,586 students) in 2025.

== Transport ==
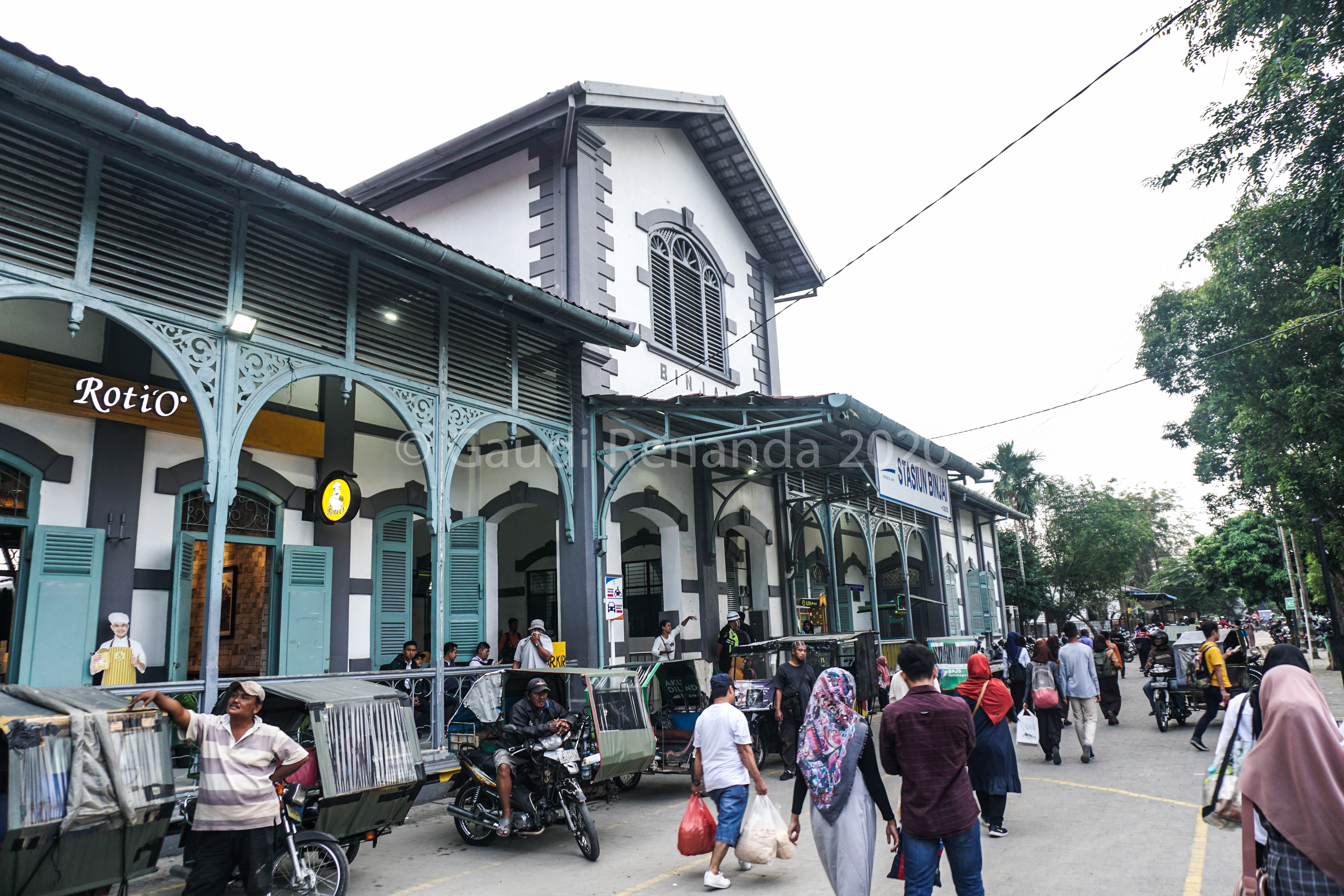
Binjai railway station

The major forms of public transport within the city are becak, a three-wheeled motorised vehicle, and small minibusses called "Angkot" (Angkutan Kota, Eng.="City Transport"). Aside from road transport out of the city, there is also a commuter train Sri Lelawangsa connecting Binjai with Medan; the continuing line to Kuala Bingai, Langkat Regency. Binjai also has a bus line called Trans Binjai that connects the whole city.

The nearest airport is Medan's Kuala Namu International Airport, and the nearest harbour is Port of Belawan, Medan.

== Other items of interest ==
An important icon for the city is the Struggle of 1945 Statue, which welcomes visitors from outside the city. Binjai also used to have a historic water fountain built by the Dutch, which was used as a water source for the local population, however, this was demolished and replaced by shops several years ago.

Binjai is also an important transit point for visitors to Bukit Lawang, in the Gunung Leuser National Park, an important site for the conservation of the red orangutan. Bukit Lawang is located 68 km west of Binjai.

Binjai is also the site of a nationally important military cemetery.

There are three large hospitals serving the needs of the population of Binjai. These are Korem Hospital, Binjai Public Hospital, and PTP IX Hospital.
