= Bukit Lawang =

Village and animal sanctuary in North Sumatra, Indonesia

Coordinates: 3°33.05′N 98°7.42′E

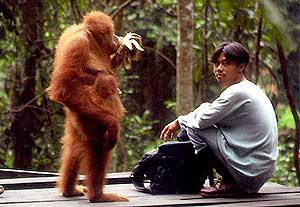
One of orangutans is being taken care at Bukit Lawang.

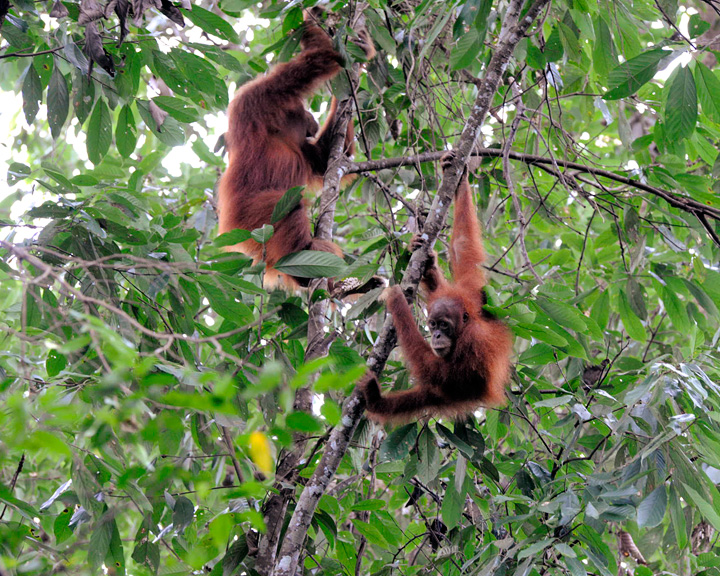
Wild orangutans near Bukit Lawang

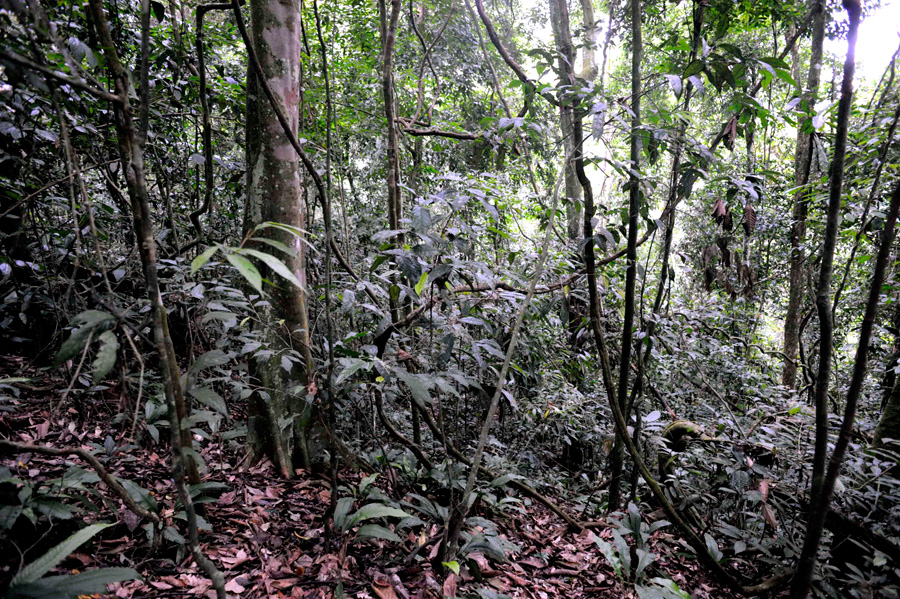
Jungle near Bukit Lawang

Bukit Lawang is a small tourist village on the bank of Bahorok River in North Sumatra province of Indonesia. Situated approximately 86 km northwest of the city of Medan, Bukit Lawang is known for the largest animal sanctuary of Sumatran orangutan (around 5,000 orangutans occupying the area) and also the main access point to the Gunung Leuser National Park from the east side.

The Bukit Lawang rehabilitation centre for orangutans was founded in 1973. Its main purpose was to preserve the decreasing number of orangutan population due to hunting, trading and deforestation. The centre closed in 2002 as the place was getting too touristy and unsuitable for animal rehabilitation.

Bukit Lawang is one of the few places in the world where tourists can observe orangutans relatively up close. They can only be observed in Sumatra and Borneo.

== Animals ==
The area serves as a key ecotourism destination and an important site for wildlife conservation.

=== Mammals ===
The region is home to several primate species, including the critically endangered Sumatran orangutan, which is the main attraction for visitors. Other primates found in the area include Thomas's leaf monkey (Presbytis thomasi), long-tailed macaques (Macaca fascicularis), pig-tailed macaques (Macaca nemestrina), siamang (Symphalangus syndactylus), and the nocturnal slow loris (Nycticebus coucang).

Larger mammals in the park, though rarely seen near Bukit Lawang, include the Sumatran tiger (Panthera tigris sumatrae), Malayan sun bear (Helarctos malayanus), Sumatran rhinoceros (Dicerorhinus sumatrensis), and the clouded leopard (Neofelis diardi). More commonly observed species include wild boar (Sus scrofa), flying squirrels, and civets.

=== Birds ===
Gunung Leuser National Park, including the Bukit Lawang area, hosts a wide variety of bird species. Notable species include several types of hornbills such as the rhinoceros hornbill (Buceros rhinoceros), kingfishers, drongos, trogons, and various raptors including eagles and hawks.

=== Reptiles and Amphibians ===
A range of reptilian and amphibian species inhabit the region’s forests and riverbanks. These include monitor lizards, reticulated pythons (Malayopython reticulatus), green pit vipers, and various species of frogs and toads.

=== Invertebrates ===
The tropical environment supports a diverse array of invertebrates, including numerous butterfly species, stick insects, large orb-weaving spiders, tarantulas, and land leeches, particularly during the rainy season.

Ecotourism in Bukit Lawang plays a crucial role in both supporting the local economy and promoting conservation awareness. Guided treks into the national park, which are often led by licensed local guides, offer opportunities for visitors to observe wildlife while minimizing human impact on the ecosystem.

== History ==
A flash flood hit Bukit Lawang on 2 November 2003. The disaster destroyed the local tourist resorts and had a devastating impact to the local tourism industry in the area.

Around 400 houses, 3 mosques, 8 bridges, 280 kiosks and food stalls, 35 hotels and guest houses were destroyed by the flood; 239 people including 5 tourists were killed, and around 1,400 locals lost their homes. Local authorities and an environmental NGO attributed it to illegal logging.

Thanks to several international cooperation agencies, the site was rebuilt and re-opened again in July 2004. The area is slowly regenerating and offers wildlife tourism.

== Safety ==
Bukit Lawang is generally considered to be safe and friendly to tourists.

=== Transport ===
The primary mode of transport is motorbikes and few people wear helmets. The weather can be temperamental with rainstorms so roads can become slippery. The roads from Medan to Bukit Lawang are very uneven.

=== Scams ===
There is potential for unlicensed or disreputable guides. There have been incidences where solo female travelers felt psychologically unsafe around their male staff at night in the jungle. Because of the muslim culture, tourist guides are pre-dominantly male. Currently, the only operator that trains and works with female guides is Local Guides.

=== Alcohol ===
Although a predominantly Muslim area, alcohol is still served. Counterfeit alcohol (such as methanol) has been served in Bukit Lawang.

=== Weather and phenomenons ===
Sumatra is located in a seismic zone and can experience earthquakes, tsunamis, and other natural hazards, especially during the rainy season. The river that runs through Bukit Lawang can have a strong current, especially after heavy rain.
