= Stabat =

Stabat District Kecamatan Stabat
- District

Other transcription(s)
  - Jawi: ستابت
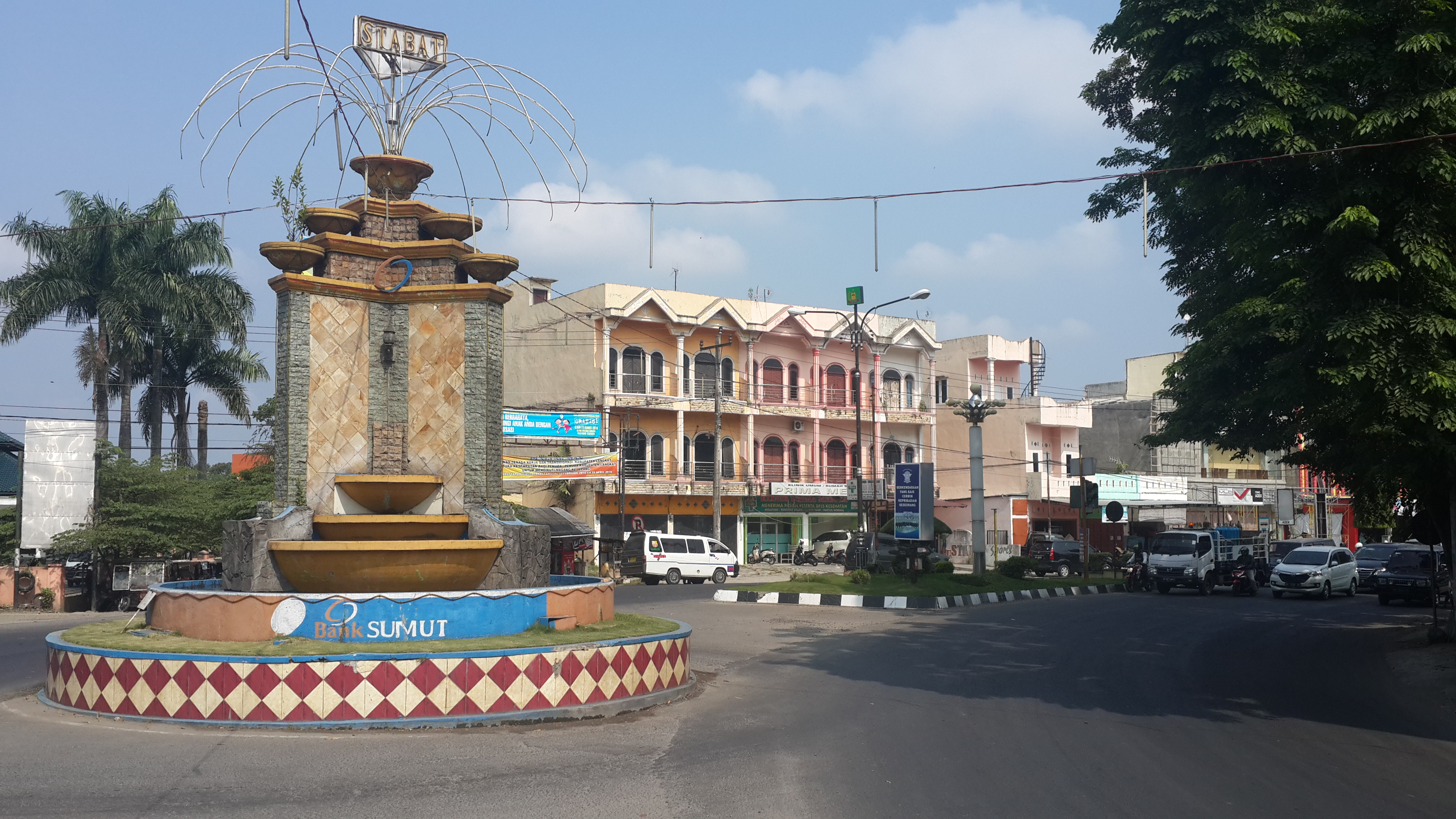
- Stabat
- Interactive map of Stabat District
- Coordinates: 3°50′N 98°10′E
- Country: Indonesia
- Province: North Sumatra
- Regency: Langkat Regency
- Capital: Stabat

Area
  - Total: 108.85 km^{2} (42.03 sq mi)
- Elevation: 4 m (13 ft)

Population (mid 2024 Estimate)
  - Total: 96,873
  - Density: 889.97/km^{2} (2,305.0/sq mi)

Ethnic groups (2007)
  - Javanese: 14.3%
  - Malay: 67.2%
  - Karo: 1.8%
  - Batak Toba and Batak Simalungun: 3.3%
  - Batak Mandailing: 2.6%
  - Others: 10.8%

Religious affiliations (2007)
  - Islam: 93.9%
  - Protestant: 2.6%
  - Roman Catholic: 0.5%
  - Buddhism: 2.9%
  - Hindu: 0.1%
  - Others: 0%
- Time zone: UTC+7 (WIB)
- Distance from Regency capital to district capital: 0km

Stabat is a town in North Sumatra province of Indonesia and it is the seat (capital) of Langkat Regency. The town lies on the road between Medan and Banda Aceh, a short distance past the city of Binjai.

Stabat District is one of the 23 districts of Langkat Regency. Its capital is the town of Stabat. It is bordered by Wampu District to the west, Secanggang District to the north, Binjai to the south, and Hamparan Perak District of Deli Serdang Regency to the east. It covers an area of 108.85 km^{2} and had a population of 81,971 at the 2010 Census, which had risen to 96,873 according to the official estimate for mid 2024.

Stabat has been a centre of government since the Dutch colonial period.

== Climate ==
Stabat has a tropical rainforest climate (Af) with heavy rainfall year-round.

Climate data for Stabat
Month	Jan	Feb	Mar	Apr	May	Jun	Jul	Aug	Sep	Oct	Nov	Dec	Year
Mean daily maximum °C (°F)	30.9 (87.6)	31.7 (89.1)	32.2 (90.0)	32.5 (90.5)	32.6 (90.7)	32.7 (90.9)	32.4 (90.3)	32.3 (90.1)	31.6 (88.9)	31.1 (88.0)	30.7 (87.3)	30.6 (87.1)	31.8 (89.2)
Daily mean °C (°F)	26.3 (79.3)	26.6 (79.9)	27.0 (80.6)	27.4 (81.3)	27.6 (81.7)	27.5 (81.5)	27.1 (80.8)	27.1 (80.8)	27.0 (80.6)	26.7 (80.1)	26.4 (79.5)	26.3 (79.3)	26.9 (80.4)
Mean daily minimum °C (°F)	21.7 (71.1)	21.6 (70.9)	21.9 (71.4)	22.4 (72.3)	22.7 (72.9)	22.3 (72.1)	21.9 (71.4)	22.0 (71.6)	22.4 (72.3)	22.4 (72.3)	22.1 (71.8)	22.0 (71.6)	22.1 (71.8)
Average rainfall mm (inches)	135 (5.3)	100 (3.9)	116 (4.6)	150 (5.9)	222 (8.7)	148 (5.8)	169 (6.7)	195 (7.7)	249 (9.8)	292 (11.5)	271 (10.7)	217 (8.5)	2,264 (89.1)
Source: Climate-Data.org
